= Nathaniel B. Treat =

19th century American politician

Member of the Wisconsin State Assembly from the Green district
- In office January 7, 1895 – January 2, 1899
- Preceded by: Henry Putnam
- Succeeded by: A. Clarke Dodge

Personal details
- Born: March 12, 1839 Orono, Maine, U.S.
- Died: December 26, 1930 (aged 91) Monroe, Wisconsin, U.S.
- Resting place: Greenwood Cemetery, Monroe, Wisconsin
- Party: Republican
- Spouses: Ava E. Read (m. 1866; died 1875); Helen Gilman (m. 1876; died 1908)
- Children: with Ava Read; Frank A. Treat^{(b. 1867; died 1941)}; Nellie S. (Williams)^{(b. 1869; died 1946)}; Emma Treat^{(b. 1875; died 1875)}
- Parent: Nathaniel Treat (father)
- Relatives: Joseph B. Treat (brother); Charles Treat (nephew)

Military service
- Allegiance: United States
- Branch/service: United States Volunteers; Union Army
- Years of service: 1862–1865
- Rank: Captain, USV
- Unit: 31st Reg. Wis. Vol. Infantry
- Battles/wars: American Civil War

Nathaniel B. Treat (March 12, 1839 – December 26, 1930) was an American businessman, banker, and Republican politician. He served four years in the Wisconsin State Assembly, representing Green County. During the American Civil War, he served as a Union Army officer and was on the staff of General William Tecumseh Sherman.

== Early life ==
Nathaniel B. Treat was born in Orono, Maine, and was educated in the public schools there. He moved to Wisconsin in 1858 and settled in Monroe, in Green County.

== Civil War service ==
In July 1862, Treat volunteered for service in the American Civil War and was appointed first lieutenant of Company B in the 31st Wisconsin Infantry Regiment. The regiment was initially engaged in guarding Confederate prisoners of war, held in prison camps in Wisconsin. They mustered into federal service in December 1862 and went forward to Tennessee, where they spent the next 18 months guarding supply routes. Treat was promoted to captain of Company B on October 8, 1863.

In July 1864, they were ordered to proceed to the front in the midst of General William Tecumseh Sherman's Atlanta campaign, and arrived just in time to join the Battle of Atlanta. Following consolidation of control in Atlanta, Sherman set off on his March to the Sea. During this campaign, Treat was detailed to General Sherman's staff, and remained with his staff until the end of the war. He mustered out of federal service with his regiment on June 20, 1865.

== Postbellum career ==
After returning to Wisconsin, Treat was engaged in a mercantile business and served as foreman of the engine company 1 of the Monroe volunteer fire department. He served on the Monroe Common Council and the Green County Board of Supervisors. Treat was involved in the Republican Party and was elected to the Wisconsin State Assembly in 1894, representing all of Green County. He was re-elected in 1896, but was not a candidate for re-election in 1898.

After his term in the Assembly, Treat was appointed to the State Board of Control by Governor Edward Scofield. The Board of Control was charged with overseeing Wisconsin's state prisons, institutions for the insane, schools for wards of the state, and schools for the blind and deaf. He also became involved in the banking business for the rest of his career.

Treat died at his home in Monroe, Wisconsin, at age 91.

== Personal life and family ==
Nathaniel B. Treat was one of ten children born to Nathaniel Treat, a member of the Maine House of Representatives. His elder brother, Joseph B. Treat, also moved to Wisconsin, served in the Wisconsin Legislature, and was chairman of the Republican Party of Wisconsin. Joseph's son, Charles Treat, became a major general in the United States Army after commanding a division in World War I. The Treats were descendants of Robert Treat, a colonial governor of Connecticut Colony.

Nathaniel B. Treat married twice. His first wife was Ava E. Read, with whom he had at least three children. Ava Read died in 1875, and the next year he married Helen Gilman. There were no known children of the second marriage. Helen Gilman died in a horse-drawn carriage accident in 1908; Treat was also seriously injured in the accident.

== Electoral history ==
Wisconsin Assembly, Green District Election, 1894
| Party | Candidate | Votes | % | ±% |
|---|---|---|---|---|
General Election, November 6, 1894
| Republican | Nathaniel B. Treat | 2,301 | 50.47% | +6.44% |
| Democratic | G. T. Hodges | 1,648 | 36.15% | −4.62% |
| Populist | W. H. Hudson | 345 | 7.57% | −0.56% |
| Prohibition | Lemuel Taylor | 265 | 5.81% | −1.25% |
| Plurality | | 653 | 14.32% | +11.06% |
| Total votes | | 4,559 | 100.0% | -9.81% |
| Republican hold | | | | |

Wisconsin Assembly, Green District Election, 1896
| Party | Candidate | Votes | % | ±% |
|---|---|---|---|---|
General Election, November 3, 1896
| Republican | Nathaniel B. Treat (incumbent) | 3,055 | 54.53% | +4.06% |
| Populist | Frank H. Smock | 2,394 | 42.73% | +35.17% |
| Prohibition | Alexander S. Kaye | 152 | 2.71% | −3.10% |
| Democratic | Michael Joy (write-in) | 1 | 0.02% | |
| Plurality | | 661 | 11.80% | -2.52% |
| Total votes | | 5,602 | 100.0% | +22.88% |
| Republican hold | | | | |

Wisconsin State Assembly
| Preceded by Henry Putnam | Member of the Wisconsin State Assembly from the Green district January 7, 1895 – January 2, 1899 | Succeeded by A. Clarke Dodge |
