= Church End =

Church End or Churchend is the name of several places in England.

== Church End ==
- Church End, Bedfordshire (disambiguation), several hamlets
- Church End, Aylesbury Vale, a part of Haddenham, Buckinghamshire
- Church End, Pitstone, Buckinghamshire
- Church End, Cambridgeshire (disambiguation), several hamlets
- Church End, Coventry, a suburb
- Church End, East Riding of Yorkshire
- Church End, Essex (disambiguation), several hamlets
- Church End, Frampton on Severn, Gloucestershire
- Church End, Tewkesbury, Gloucestershire
- Church End, Hampshire
- Church End, Hertfordshire (disambiguation), several hamlets
- Church End, East Lindsey, Lincolnshire
- Church End, South Holland, Lincolnshire
- Church End, Finchley, London
  - Finchley Church End (ward), Barnet
- Church End, Brent, London
  - Church End (Brent ward)
- Church End (Redbridge ward)
- Church End, Norfolk
- Church End, Great Rollright, Oxfordshire
- Church End, West Oxfordshire, a hamlet in the parish of South Leigh
- Church End, Suffolk
- Church End, Surrey
- Church End, Ansley, Warwickshire
- Church End, Shustoke, Warwickshire
- Church End, Wiltshire
- Church End, Worcestershire
- Shenley Church End, Milton Keynes, Buckinghamshire

== Churchend ==
- Churchend, Reading, an area of Tilehurst, Reading, Berkshire
- Churchend, Foulness Island, Essex
- Churchend, Eastington, Gloucestershire
- Churchend, South Gloucestershire

== See also ==
- Church End, University Stadium (Thiruvananthapuram), Kerala, India
