= Jasper's Green =

Hamlet in Essex, England

Coordinates: 51.912°N 0.503°E

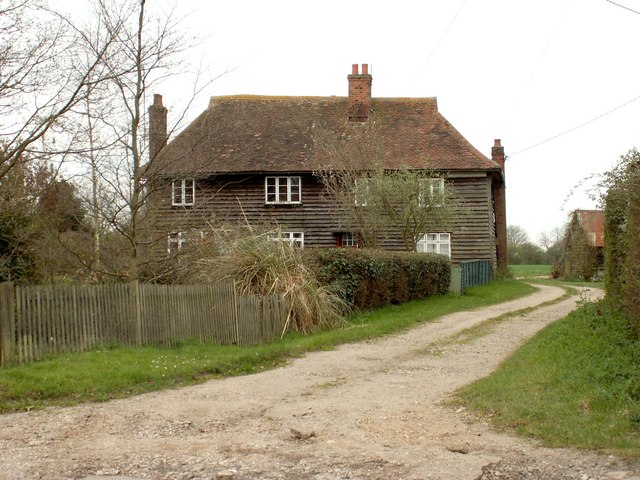
- Farmhouse at Westerns Farm

- Location within Essex
- Civil parish: Shalford
- District: Braintree
- Shire county: Essex
- Region: East
- Country: England
- Sovereign state: United Kingdom

Jasper's Green is a hamlet in the civil parish of Shalford and the Braintree district of Essex, England. The town of Braintree is 3 miles (5 km) to the southeast. Other parish hamlets are Shalford Green and Church End.
