= John Deming =

Early English colonist in North America (1615–1705)

- Born: c. 1615; Shalford, Essex, England
- Died: 21 November 1705 (aged 89–90); Wethersfield, Connecticut, English America
- Spouse: Honor Treat
- Relatives: Richard Treat (father-in-law); Nathaniel Foote (brother-in-law)

John Deming (c. 1615 – 21 November 1705) was an early Puritan settler and original patentee of the Connecticut Colony.

== Biography ==
=== Life ===
Deming was born in Shalford, Essex, England. He arrived in New England during the Great Migration with his older sister Elizabeth and her husband Nathaniel Foote. Deming and the Footes first settled in Watertown, Massachusetts, but left for the Connecticut River Valley in 1636, where they helped found the town of Wethersfield.

Deming was brother-in-law to Connecticut governors Robert Treat and Thomas Welles. After Foote died Deming's sister Elizabeth married Welles in 1646.

Benjamin Trumbull named Deming one of the "fathers of Connecticut."

=== Descendants ===
John Deming's descendants number in the thousands today. Some of his notable descendants include:

- Louisa May Alcott, was an American novelist. She is best known for the novel Little Women
- Humphrey DeForest Bogart, was an American actor. He has been called a cultural icon.
- Jérôme Napoleon Bonaparte, was a son of Jérôme Bonaparte (brother to Napoleon I) and Elizabeth Patterson, an American.
- William Edwards Deming, (1900–1993) was an American statistician, professor, author, lecturer, and consultant.
- Bruce Dern, is an American film actor.
- Laura Dern, is an American actress, film director and producer.
- John Fay, was a U.S. representative from New York.
- B.F. Goodrich, was an American industrialist in the rubber industry.
- Karen Linder, is an American business leader and author.
- Archibald MacLeish, was an American poet, writer and the librarian of Congress. He is associated with the Modernist school of poetry. He received three Pulitzer Prizes for his work.
- Cole Albert Porter, was an American composer and songwriter. His works include the musical comedies Kiss Me, Kate, Fifty Million Frenchmen, DuBarry Was a Lady and Anything Goes, as well as songs like "Night and Day," "I Get a Kick out of You," "Well, Did You Evah!" and "I've Got You Under My Skin."
- Nancy Davis Reagan, was the wife of former United States President Ronald Reagan and served as an influential First Lady of the United States from 1981 to 1989.
- Harriet Beecher Stowe, descended from John Deming's sister Elizabeth and her first husband, Nathaniel Foote the Settler, was an abolitionist and the author of Uncle Tom's Cabin (1852) that depicted life for African-Americans under slavery.
- Tennessee Williams, was an American playwright who received many of the top theatrical awards for his works of drama. He won the Pulitzer Prize for Drama for A Streetcar Named Desire in 1948 and for Cat on a Hot Tin Roof in 1955.

=== References ===
- Case, Lafayette Wallace. The Goodrich family in America. A genealogy of the descendants of John and William Goodrich of Wethersfield, Conn., Richard Goodrich of Guilford, Conn., and William Goodridge of Watertown, Mass. Fergus printing company, 1889.
- Deming, Judson Keith. Genealogy of the descendants of John Deming of Wethersfield, Connecticut: with historical notes University of Wisconsin – Madison: Publisher Press of Mathis-Mets Co., 1904
- Treat, John Harvey. Title The Treat family: a genealogy of Trott, Tratt, and Treat for fifteen generations, and four hundred and fifty years in England and America, containing more than fifteen hundred families in America Publisher The Salem press publishing & printing company, 1893.
- Whittemore, Henry The heroes of the American Revolution and their descendants: Battle of Long Island The Heroes of the American Revolution and Their Descendants: Battle of Long Island Publisher, Henry Whittemore, Heroes of the Revolution Pub. Co., 1897.
