= Listed buildings in Shalford, Essex =

Civil Parish in Essex, England

Shalford is a village and civil parish in the Braintree District of Essex, England. It contains 56 listed buildings that are recorded in the National Heritage List for England. Of these one is grade I, two are grade II* and 53 are grade II.

This list is based on the information retrieved online from Historic England.

== Key ==
Grade	Criteria
I	Buildings that are of exceptional interest
II*	Particularly important buildings of more than special interest
II	Buildings that are of special interest

== Listing ==
Name	Grade	Location	Type	Completed (Note: The date given is the date used by Historic England as significant for the initial building or that of an important part in the structure's description.)	Date designated	Grid ref. (Note: The grid reference is based on the British national grid reference system, sometimes known as OSGB36, used by the Ordnance Survey.) Geo-coordinates	Notes	Entry number (Note: The "List Entry Number" is a unique number assigned to each listed building and scheduled monument by Historic England.)	Image	Wikidata
The Old Place	II				19 March 1986	TL7199426726; 51°54′45″N 0°29′57″E		1123381	Upload Photo	Q26416485
Abbot's Hall	II	Braintree Road			19 March 1986	TL7308027756; 51°55′17″N 0°30′56″E		1123370	Upload Photo	Q26416475
Ancells in the Hole	II	Braintree Road			21 December 1967	TL7327728074; 51°55′27″N 0°31′07″E		1308418	Upload Photo	Q26595025
Barn Approximately 10 Metres North East of Goldsticks Farmhouse	II	Braintree Road			19 March 1986	TL7339027339; 51°55′03″N 0°31′11″E		1123376	Upload Photo	Q26416481
Barn Approximately 50 Metres East South East of Nichol's Farmhouse	II	Braintree Road			19 March 1986	TL7283728341; 51°55′36″N 0°30′44″E		1123375	Upload Photo	Q26416480
Barn of Shalford Hall Farm Approximately 50 Metres South West of Parish Church	II	Braintree Road			19 March 1986	TL7236229190; 51°56′04″N 0°30′21″E		1123374	Upload Photo	Q26416479
Brick House	II	Braintree Road			19 March 1986	TL7214429250; 51°56′06″N 0°30′09″E		1123368	Upload Photo	Q26416473
Croziers	II	Braintree Road			19 March 1986	TL7334027314; 51°55′03″N 0°31′09″E		1123371	Upload Photo	Q26416476
Cut Hedge Cottage	II	Braintree Road			19 March 1986	TL7333127509; 51°55′09″N 0°31′08″E		1337858	Upload Photo	Q26622226
Goldsticks Farmhouse	II	Braintree Road			19 March 1986	TL7337427317; 51°55′03″N 0°31′10″E		1147700	Upload Photo	Q26440704
Horseshoes	II	Braintree Road			19 March 1986	TL7212629306; 51°56′08″N 0°30′09″E		1123372	Upload Photo	Q26416477
Keeper's Cottage	II	Braintree Road			19 March 1986	TL7217529208; 51°56′05″N 0°30′11″E		1308480	Upload Photo	Q26595079
Nichol's Farmhouse	II	Braintree Road			2 May 1953	TL7278728352; 51°55′37″N 0°30′41″E		1147667	Upload Photo	Q26440674
Numbers 1-4 Stores Cottages	II	Braintree Road			21 December 1967	TL7221229163; 51°56′04″N 0°30′13″E		1123369	Upload Photo	Q26416474
Pages	II	Braintree Road			21 December 1967	TL7225329130; 51°56′02″N 0°30′15″E		1308485	Upload Photo	Q26595084
Parish Church of St Andrew	I	Braintree Road	church building		21 December 1967	TL7239729245; 51°56′06″N 0°30′23″E		1147647	Parish Church of St Andrew More images	Q17535987
Sheering Hall Farmhouse	II	Braintree Road	farmhouse		2 May 1953	TL7357126739; 51°54′44″N 0°31′20″E		1147609	Sheering Hall Farmhouse More images	Q26440623
Stable Block Approx 50 Metres South of Abbot's Hall	II	Braintree Road			19 March 1986	TL7306627687; 51°55′15″N 0°30′55″E		1147599	Upload Photo	Q26440613
The George Public House	II	Braintree Road	pub		2 May 1953	TL7222329184; 51°56′04″N 0°30′13″E		1147630	The George Public House More images	Q26440642
The Old Vicarage	II	Braintree Road			19 March 1986	TL7222829214; 51°56′05″N 0°30′14″E		1123373	Upload Photo	Q26416478
Wall of Shalford Hall	II	Braintree Road			19 March 1986	TL7253629151; 51°56′03″N 0°30′30″E		1337857	Upload Photo	Q26622225
Willow Tree Cottage	II	Braintree Road			19 March 1986	TL7362126848; 51°54′47″N 0°31′22″E		1147707	Upload Photo	Q26440710
Grubb's Cottage	II	Church End			19 March 1986	TL7231628063; 51°55′28″N 0°30′16″E		1123377	Upload Photo	Q26416482
Little Gables	II	Church End			19 March 1986	TL7220827952; 51°55′24″N 0°30′10″E		1147721	Upload Photo	Q26440721
Lone's Hole (north)	II	Codham's Lane			19 March 1986	TL7344428483; 51°55′40″N 0°31′16″E		1337859	Upload Photo	Q26622227
Lone's Hole (south)	II	Codham's Lane			19 March 1986	TL7344628469; 51°55′40″N 0°31′16″E		1308395	Upload Photo	Q26595004
Wade's Gardens	II	1 and 2, Ewen Bridge Road			19 March 1986	TL7312228509; 51°55′41″N 0°30′59″E		1147746	Upload Photo	Q26440744
Ewen Bridge Farmhouse	II	Ewen Bridge Road			21 December 1967	TL7305928575; 51°55′44″N 0°30′56″E		1123378	Upload Photo	Q26416483
Prayers Thorn	II	Ewen Bridge Road			19 March 1986	TL7318128398; 51°55′38″N 0°31′02″E		1337820	Upload Photo	Q26622191
Garretts	II*	Garretts Lane			21 December 1967	TL7177027240; 51°55′02″N 0°29′46″E		1147765	Upload Photo	Q17557502
Cartlodge Approximately 30 Metres North West of Hunt's Farmhouse	II	Hull's Lane			19 March 1986	TL7062028917; 51°55′57″N 0°28′49″E		1337821	Upload Photo	Q26622192
Hunt's Farmhouse	II	Hull's Lane			21 December 1967	TL7065528900; 51°55′57″N 0°28′51″E		1147783	Upload Photo	Q26440776
Redfants Manor	II*	Hull's Lane			2 May 1953	TL7138429638; 51°56′20″N 0°29′30″E		1123379	Upload Photo	Q17557308
Unnamed Cottage Approximately 40 Metres West North West of Ringers	II	Hull's Lane			19 March 1986	TL7097829212; 51°56′07″N 0°29′08″E		1123380	Upload Photo	Q26416484
April Cottage	II	Jasper's Green			19 March 1986	TL7176426881; 51°54′50″N 0°29′45″E		1147805	Upload Photo	Q26440794
Burnthouse Farmhouse	II	Jasper's Green			15 February 1983	TL7230826696; 51°54′44″N 0°30′13″E		1123382	Upload Photo	Q26416486
Cold Hall Cottages	II	Jasper's Green			19 March 1986	TL7232326125; 51°54′25″N 0°30′13″E		1123383	Upload Photo	Q26416487
Granary and Cart Shed About 30 Metres North West of Numbers 1 and 2 Western's Cottages	II	Jasper's Green, Jaspers Green			27 June 1991	TL7198526652; 51°54′43″N 0°29′56″E		1306733	Upload Photo	Q26593477
King's Croft	II	Jasper's Green			19 March 1986	TL7215026593; 51°54′41″N 0°30′05″E		1337822	Upload Photo	Q26622193
Lowlands Farmhouse	II	Jasper's Green			19 March 1986	TL7209726379; 51°54′34″N 0°30′02″E		1307197	Upload Photo	Q26593893
Roseland's Farmhouse	II	Jasper's Green			19 March 1986	TL7231226460; 51°54′36″N 0°30′13″E		1307198	Upload Photo	Q26593894
K6 Kiosk	II	Jaspers Green			5 April 1994	TL7205626669; 51°54′43″N 0°30′00″E		1140093	Upload Photo	Q26432890
Constables	II	Parkend Lane, Jasper's Green			19 March 1986	TL7141227602; 51°55′14″N 0°29′28″E		1123341	Upload Photo	Q26416447
Ash Tree Cottage	II	Shalford Green			19 March 1986	TL7124827094; 51°54′58″N 0°29′19″E		1123345	Upload Photo	Q26416451
Barn Approximately 40 Metres North West of Little's Farmhouse	II	Shalford Green			19 March 1986	TL7094827401; 51°55′08″N 0°29′04″E		1337842	Upload Photo	Q26622210
Bay's Farmhouse	II	Shalford Green			2 May 1953	TL7115227232; 51°55′02″N 0°29′14″E		1123342	Upload Photo	Q26416448
Chapel Cottage	II	Shalford Green			3 August 1984	TL7128027084; 51°54′57″N 0°29′20″E		1337844	Upload Photo	Q26622212
Dynes Farmhouse	II	Shalford Green			2 May 1953	TL7137227465; 51°55′10″N 0°29′26″E		1123343	Upload Photo	Q26416449
Elm Cottage and Pottery Cottage	II	Shalford Green			21 December 1967	TL7131727337; 51°55′06″N 0°29′23″E		1337843	Upload Photo	Q26622211
Little Martins	II	Shalford Green			19 March 1986	TL7102726921; 51°54′52″N 0°29′07″E		1123346	Upload Photo	Q26416452
White Hall	II	Shalford Green			19 March 1986	TL7129427273; 51°55′03″N 0°29′21″E		1123344	Upload Photo	Q26416450
Barn Approximately 15 Metres North of Water Hall	II	Water Hall Lane			10 October 1985	TL7296029131; 51°56′02″N 0°30′52″E		1123347	Upload Photo	Q26416453
Water Hall	II	Water Hall Lane			10 October 1985	TL7295729111; 51°56′01″N 0°30′52″E		1337845	Upload Photo	Q26622213
Brook Cottage	II	Water Lane			19 March 1986	TL7251026972; 51°54′52″N 0°30′25″E		1123348	Upload Photo	Q26416454
Sleepy Hollow	II	Water Lane			19 March 1986	TL7312427406; 51°55′06″N 0°30′57″E		1307140	Upload Photo	Q26593841
Western's Cottages	II	1 and 2, Western's Cottages, Jasper's Green			19 March 1986	TL7201826644; 51°54′42″N 0°29′58″E		1147820	Upload Photo	Q26440809

== See also ==
- Grade I listed buildings in Essex
- Grade II* listed buildings in Essex

== Sources ==
- Bettley, James; Pevsner, Nikolaus (2007) [1954], Essex, The Buildings of England, New Haven and London: Yale University Press, ISBN 978-0-300-11614-4
