= Richard Treat =

Early English colonist in North America

Member of the Connecticut General Assembly
- In office 1644–1657

Personal details
- Born: Richard Trott c. August 1584 Pitminster, Somerset, England
- Died: 27 April 1669 (aged 84) Wethersfield, Connecticut, English America
- Spouse: Alice Gaylord (m. 1615)
- Children: 11, including Robert
- Relatives: John Deming (son-in-law)
- Occupation: Juror; landowner; politician

Richard Treat (né Trott; c. August 1584 – 27 April 1669) was an English-born Connecticut juror, landowner, and politician who served as Member of the Connecticut General Assembly from 1644 to 1657, and a Patentee of the Royal Charter of Connecticut in 1662.

== Biography ==
=== Early life and ancestors ===
He was baptized on August 28, 1584, at Pitminster, county of Somerset, England, the son of Robert and Honoria Trott, and died on April 27, 1669, at Wethersfield, Hartford County, Connecticut. He was an early New England settler who emigrated from Pitminster, England, to the Massachusetts Bay Colony in 1637.

=== Marriage and family ===
He was married on April 27, 1615, at Pitminster, Somerset County, England, to Alice Gaylord (born May 10, 1594, at Pitminster, Somerset County, England, she died at Wethersfield, Hartford County, Connecticut). She was the daughter of Hugh Gaylord and Joanna.

Richard and Alice were the parents of 11 children. Their son, Robert Treat (February 23, 1622 – July 12, 1710), served as governor of Connecticut from 1683 to 1698. Their daughter, Joanna, was the wife of Lieut. John Hollister. Their daughter, Susanna, was the wife of Robert Webster, the son of John Webster (governor). Their daughter, Honor, married John Deming, an early Puritan settler and original patentee of the Royal Charter of Connecticut. Their daughter, Sarah, married Matthew Camfield (1604–1673) circa 1643 at New Haven Colony, an early Puritan settler of New Haven Colony and a founder of Newark, New Jersey in 1666.

=== Career ===
He was one of the first settlers of Wethersfield, Connecticut in 1637 and was an extensive landowner in the town (over 900 acres). He represented Wethersfield in the first general court in 1637. He was appointed in 1642 by the general court, in connection with Gov. George Wyllys, Messrs. Haines, Hopkins, Whiting, and others, to superintend building a ship, and to collect a revenue for that object.

In the list of Freeman (Colonial) of Wethersfield for 1659, only three besides Richard Treat, Sr., are styled Mr., and he bore that title as early as 1642, and perhaps earlier. Mr. Treat must have been a man of high social standing and of much influence in the town of Wethersfield, and in the colony of Connecticut.

He was chosen a juror, June 15, 1643 and grand juror, on September 15 of the same year.

In April, 1644, he was chosen deputy, and was annually elected for fourteen years, up to 1657-8. From 1658 to 1665, he was elected assistant magistrate of the colony eight times, and was named in the royal charter of Charles II as one of the original patentees of the Charter of the Colony of Connecticut. On Oct. 25,1644, he and Mr. Wells were the committee and the revenue collectors of the Fenwick tax a fund for the support of students in the college at Cambridge. In 1654, he was chosen on a committee to lay out lands granted by the town and in 1660, he was elected a townsman, an office answering to the present selectmen

=== Descendants ===
Richard Treat's descendants number in the thousands today. Some of his notable descendants include:

- George H. W. Bush, 41st President of the United States
- George W. Bush, 43rd President of the United States
- Samuel Colt, inventor and industrialist.
- Robert Treat Paine, a signer of the Declaration of Independence
- Dr. John Franklin Gray, the first practitioner of Homeopathy in the United States.
- Gerald Warner Brace, writer, educator, sailor and boat builder.
- Gideon Welles, Secretary of the Navy, 1861–1869.
- W. Edwards Deming statistician, professor, author, lecturer, and consultant
- Treat Williams, Actor/Pilot
- C. Loring Brace, anthropologist
- Henry Ford II, president, chairman of the board and CEO of Ford Motor Company.
- John B. Hollister, Representative from Ohio
- Stephen Crane, author (The Red Badge of Courage)
- Thomas Edison, inventor
- J. P. Morgan, financier
- Charles H. Treat, Treasurer of the United States from 1905–1909
- Charles W. Woodworth, entomologist
- Samuel Hubbel Treat, Jr., federal judge
- John Hunt Morgan, Confederate general and cavalry officer in the American Civil War
- Madison Grant, conservationist and eugenicist
- Samuel Treat, federal judge
- Roger Treat, sportswriter and author
- Treat Baldwin Johnson, chemist
- Tennessee Williams, playwright
- John Hay Whitney U.S. Ambassador to the United Kingdom, publisher of the New York Herald Tribune.
- Cornelius Vanderbilt Whitney businessman, film producer, writer, and government official
- Robert Treat, (February 23, 1624 – July 12, 1710) was an American colonial leader, militia officer and governor of the Connecticut Colony between 1683 and 1698.
- William W. Treat, chairman of the New Hampshire Republican Party, probate judge, and U.S. delegate to the United Nations
- Noah Webster, lexicographer, through Richard's daughter Susanna, wife of Robert Webster
- Cornelius Mortimer Treat, teacher, farmer, and politician
- William Howard Doane, hymn composer and industrialist
- Lewis E. Stanton, lawyer
- Victor W. Voorhees, architect
- Payson J. Treat, historian of East Asia

For other descendants through his son Robert, see Robert Treat#Notable descendants.
