= Joseph B. Treat =

19th century American politician

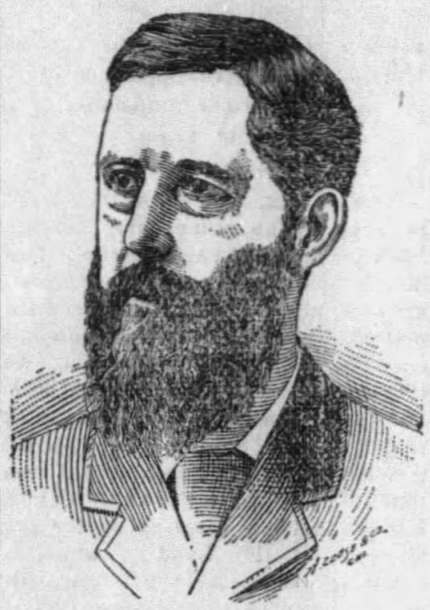

Chairman of the Republican Party of Wisconsin
- In office August 1898 – August 1900
- Preceded by: Edwin Coe
- Succeeded by: George E. Bryant

Member of the Wisconsin Senate from the 12th district
- In office January 3, 1876 – January 5, 1880
- Preceded by: Harvey T. Moore
- Succeeded by: John W. Blackstone Jr.

Personal details
- Born: Joseph Bradford Treat; December 22, 1836 Orono, Maine
- Died: December 23, 1919 (aged 83) Monroe, Wisconsin
- Party: Republican
- Spouse: Priscilla W. Gould (m. 1859)
- Children: Charles Treat
- Parent: Nathaniel Treat (father)
- Relatives: Nathaniel B. Treat (brother)
- Occupation: Businessman, politician

Joseph Bradford Treat (December 22, 1836 – December 23, 1919) was an American businessman and Republican politician. He served as a member of the Wisconsin State Senate, representing Green County, and later served as chairman of the Republican Party of Wisconsin.

== Biography ==
Treat was born on December 22, 1836, in Orono, Maine. His father, Nathaniel Treat, was a member of the Maine House of Representatives and built the Nathaniel Treat House. They were descended from Robert Treat. On January 18, 1859, Treat married Priscilla W. Gould. They had two sons, including Charles Treat, who became a major general in the United States Army. He and his family were Universalists.

In 1860, Treat settled in Monroe, Wisconsin. There, he established a dry-goods business before becoming involved in lumber and banking. He died in 1919 in Monroe.

== Political career ==
Treat was a member of the Senate from 1876 to 1880. He represented the 12th District. Other positions he held include Mayor and member of the school board of Monroe, Chairman of the county board of Green County, Wisconsin, Chairman of the Republican State Central Committee and delegate to the 1900 Republican National Convention.

Party political offices
Preceded by Edwin Coe	Chairman of the Republican Party of Wisconsin; August 1898 – August 1900	Succeeded by George E. Bryant
Wisconsin Senate
Preceded by Harvey T. Moore	Member of the Wisconsin Senate from the 12th district January 3, 1876 – January 5, 1880	Succeeded by John W. Blackstone Jr.
