= 1956 Republican Party presidential primaries =

Selection of Republican US presidential candidate

- March 11 to June 5, 1956
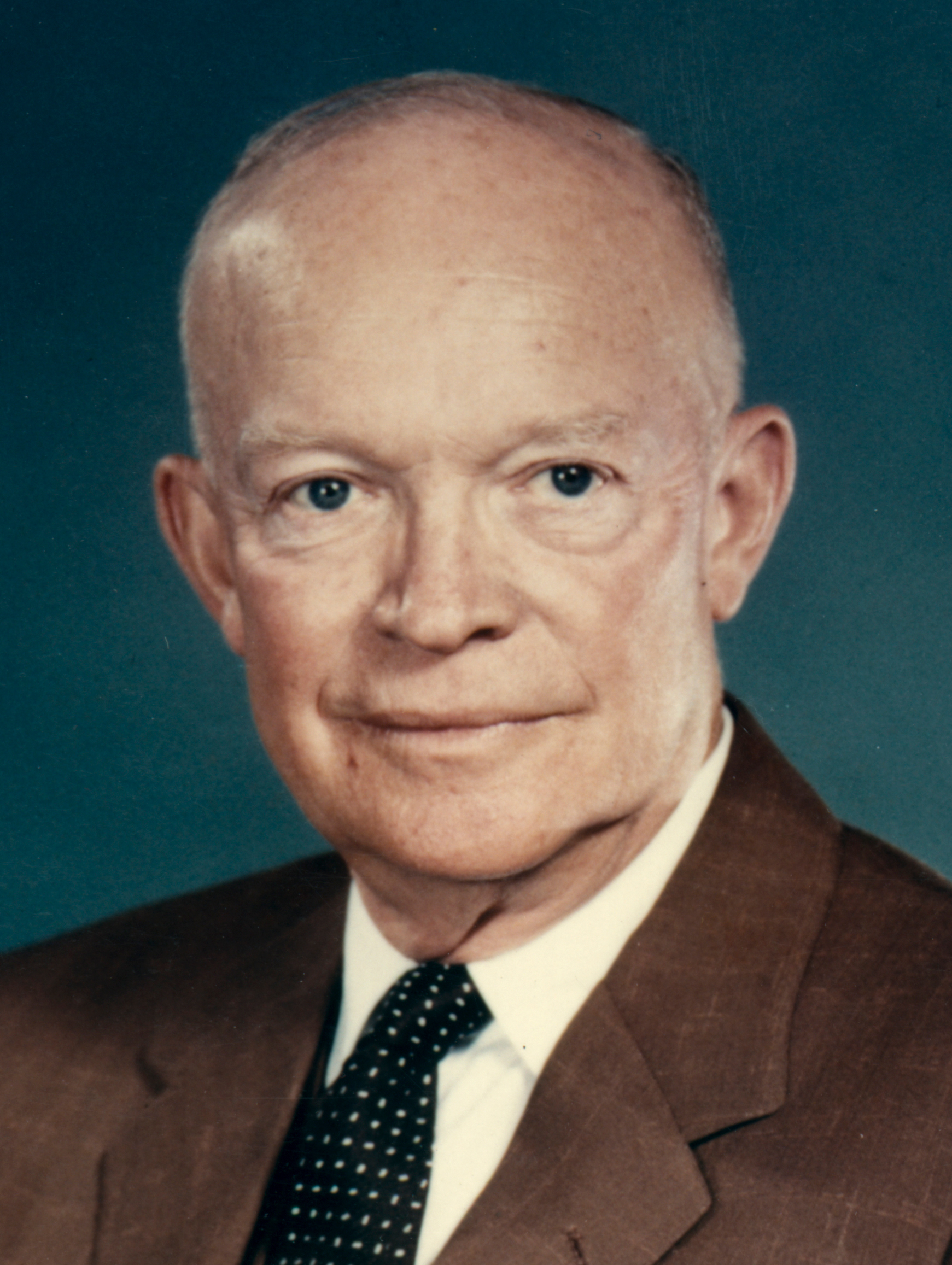

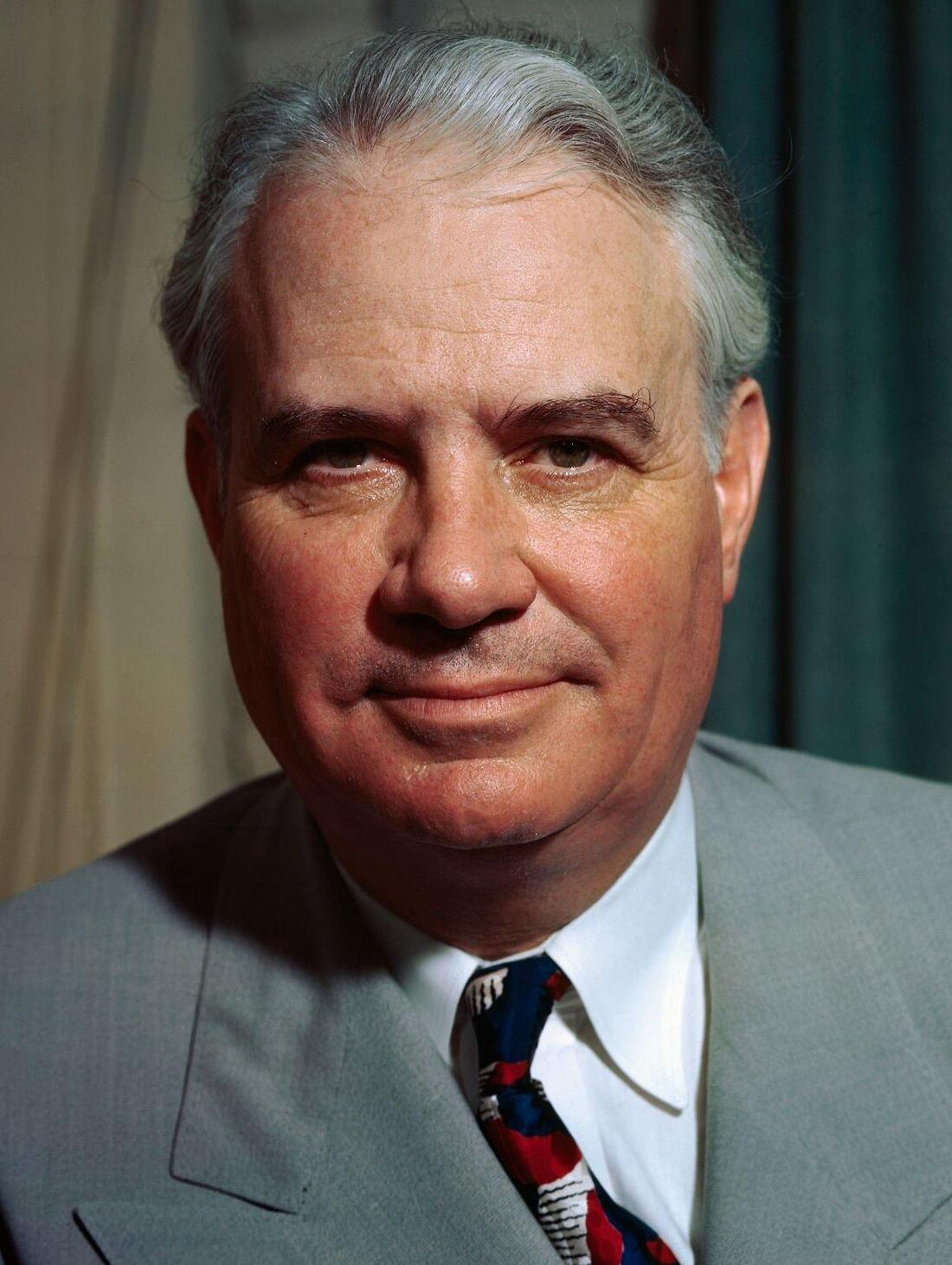
Candidate	Dwight D. Eisenhower	John W. Bricker (Note: Bricker was endorsed by Ohio Republican leaders to be the state's favorite son candidate. Bricker accepted, but stated that if President Eisenhower ran for re-election, he would give Ohio's delegates to Eisenhower.)
Home state	Pennsylvania	Ohio
Contests won	16	1
Popular vote	5,008,132	478,453
Percentage	85.9%	8.21%
- Eisenhower; Various (Note: Favorite sons received the support of Ohio (John W. Bricker), South Dakota (Joe Foss), and Montana (S. C. Arnold).) Uncommitted
Previous Republican nominee
Dwight D. Eisenhower
Republican nominee
Dwight D. Eisenhower

From March 11 to June 5, 1956, voters of the Republican Party chose its nominee for president in the 1956 United States presidential election. Incumbent President Dwight D. Eisenhower was again selected as the nominee through a series of primary elections and caucuses culminating in the 1956 Republican National Convention held from August 20 to August 23, 1956, in San Francisco, California.

Eisenhower sought re-nomination and faced no formidable opposition. He swept the primaries without difficulty. Senator William F. Knowland of California was on the ballot for a number of them. Knowland had announced he would run if Ike would not, and the president announced so late that there was no time for Knowland to withdraw.

== Candidates ==
=== Nominee ===
Candidate	Most recent position	Home state	Campaign	Popular vote	Contests won	Running mate
Dwight D. Eisenhower	President of the United States (1953–1961)	Pennsylvania	(Campaign) Secured nomination: August 20, 1956	5,008,132 (85.9%)	16	Richard Nixon

=== Withdrew ===
Candidate	Most recent position	Home state	Popular vote	Contests won
William F. Knowland	U.S. Senator from California (1945–59)	California	84,446 (1.45%)	0

=== Favorite sons ===
Candidate	Most recent position	Home state	Popular vote
John W. Bricker	U.S. Senator from Ohio (1947–53)	Ohio	478,453 (8.21%)
Joe Foss	Governor of South Dakota (1955-1959)	South Dakota	59,374 (1.02%)
S. C. Arnold	Montana Secretary of State (1955–1957)	Montana	32,732 (0.56%)

== Polling ==
=== National polling ===
Poll source	Publication	John Bricker	Dwight Eisenhower	William Knowland	Richard Nixon
Gallup	Aug. 1954	—	79%	–	—
Gallup	Dec. 1954	—	74%	–	—
Gallup	Apr. 1955	2%	62%	2%	4%
Gallup	Aug. 1955	—	85%	2%	2%
Gallup	Jan. 1956	–	82%	—	—

== Results ==
Statewide contest won by candidates

		Dwight D. Eisenhower	John W. Bricker	William F. Knowland	Joe Foss ^{[a]}	S. C. Arnold ^{[a]}	Unpledged
March 13	New Hampshire	99%	0%	0%	0%	0%	0%
March 20	Minnesota	98%	0%	2%	0%	0%	0%
April 3	Wisconsin	96%	0%	0%	0%	0%	0%
April 10	Illinois	95%	0%	4%	0%	0%	0%
April 17	New Jersey	100%	0%	0%	0%	0%	0%
April 24	Alaska	94%	0%	6%	0%	0%	0%
April 24	Massachusetts	95%	0%	0%	0%	0%	0%
April 24	Pennsylvania	96%	0%	4%	0%	0%	0%
May 1	Washington, D.C.	100%	0%	0%	0%	0%	0%
May 7	Maryland	96%	0%	0%	0%	0%	4%
May 8	Indiana	96%	0%	0%	0%	0%	0%
May 8	Ohio	0%	100%	0%	0%	0%	0%
May 8	West Virginia	0%	0%	0%	0%	0%	100%
May 15	Nebraska	100%	0%	0%	0%	0%	0%
May 18	Oregon	100%	0%	0%	0%	0%	0%
May 29	Florida	92%	0%	8%	0%	0%	0%
June 6	California	100%	0%	0%	0%	0%	0%
June 5	Montana	0%	0%	0%	0%	86%	0%
June 5	South Dakota	0%	0%	0%	100%	0%	0%

a. ^{stand-in candidate for Eisenhower.}

=== Total popular vote results ===
Primaries total popular vote results

- Dwight D. Eisenhower - 5,008,132 (85.93%)
- John W. Bricker - 478,453 (8.21%)
- Unpledged - 115,014 (1.97%)
- William F. Knowland - 84,446 (1.45%)
- Joe Foss - 59,374 (1.02%)
- S. C. Arnold - 32,732 (0.56%)
- Others - 50,283 (0.86%)

== See also ==
- 1956 Democratic Party presidential primaries
