= Henry Putnam =

19th century American politician

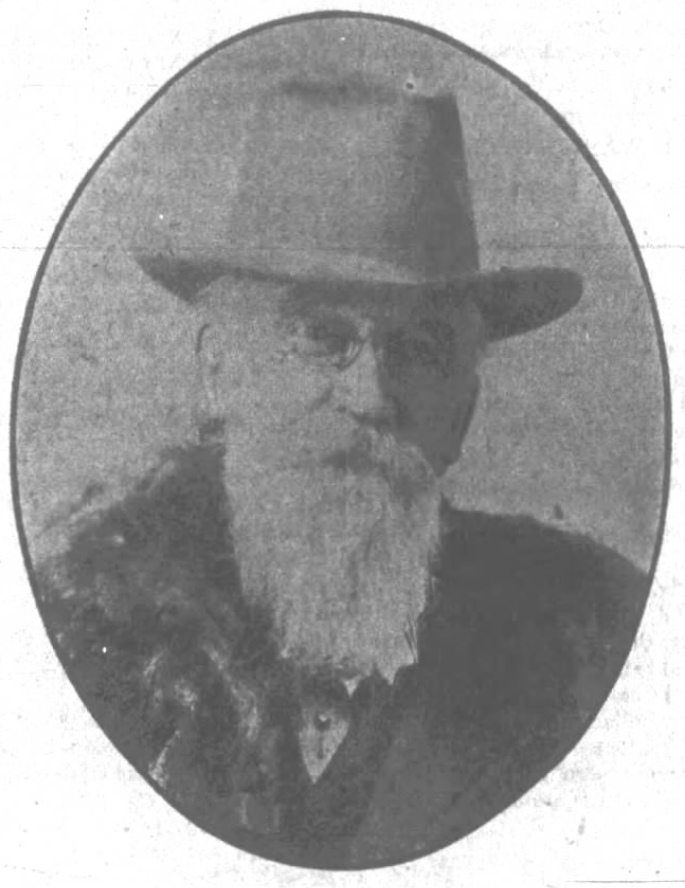

Member of the Wisconsin Senate from the 17th district
- In office January 7, 1895 – January 2, 1899
- Preceded by: Richard Burdge
- Succeeded by: Harry C. Martin

Member of the Wisconsin State Assembly
- In office January 2, 1893 – January 7, 1895
- Preceded by: District established
- Succeeded by: Nathaniel B. Treat
- Constituency: Green district
- In office January 5, 1891 – January 2, 1893
- Preceded by: Philip Allen
- Succeeded by: District abolished
- Constituency: Green–Lafayette 2nd district

Personal details
- Born: January 17, 1846 Newark, Ohio
- Died: July 7, 1913 (aged 67) Brodhead, Wisconsin
- Party: Republican
- Spouse: Frances Sutherland (died 1895)
- Children: Essie Putnam; (b. 1872; died 1873)
- Occupation: Farmer, banker

Military service
- Allegiance: United States
- Branch/service: United States Volunteers; Union Army
- Years of service: 1863–1865
- Rank: Corporal, USV
- Unit: 1st Reg. Wis. Vol. Cavalry
- Battles/wars: American Civil War

Henry Clay Putnam (January 17, 1846 – July 7, 1913) was an American businessman, Republican politician, and Wisconsin pioneer. He served four years each in the Wisconsin State Senate and Assembly, representing Green County. During the American Civil War, he was enlisted in the Union Army.

== Early life ==
Putnam was born in Newark, Ohio, in 1846. He moved to Wisconsin with his parents in 1849, settling in Decatur in Green County. He was educated in the common schools in Green County until age 16, when he enlisted in the Union Army.

== Civil War service ==
Putnam enlisted in the Summer of 1863 and was enrolled as a private in Company B of the 1st Wisconsin Cavalry Regiment. He was subsequently promoted to corporal. He joined the regiment near Chattanooga, Tennessee, in the midst of the Chattanooga campaign. With the regiment, he went on to participate in the Battle of Mossy Creek, the Battle of Dandridge, Sherman's Atlanta campaign, and Wilson's Raid in Alabama and Georgia.

== Postbellum career ==
Putnam mustered out with his regiment in July 1865. After returning to Wisconsin, he worked as a traveling salesman for nine years, then worked in the lumber business and operated a farm. In the 1890s, he became vice president of the Green County Bank of Brodhead.

Politically, Putnam associated with the Republican Party. He was elected president of the Village of Brodhead, Wisconsin, in 1883 and 1884 and was elected to the Wisconsin State Assembly in 1890 and 1892. In 1894, he was elected to the Wisconsin State Senate, representing the 17th Senate district for four years. He was not a candidate for re-election in 1898.

He died at his home in Brodhead, Wisconsin, in 1913.

== Personal life and family ==
Putnam was active for the remainder of his life in the Wisconsin chapter of the Grand Army of the Republic. He married Frances Sutherland, but their only child died in infancy.

== Electoral history ==
=== Wisconsin Assembly (1890, 1892) ===
Wisconsin Assembly, Green–Lafayette 2nd District Election, 1890
Party	Candidate	Votes	%	±%
General Election, November 4, 1890
Republican	Henry C. Putnam	1,299	47.05%	−1.43%
Democratic	Rinaldo R. Fleek	1,217	44.08%	+4.48%
Prohibition	J. C. Murdock	151	5.47%	−1.44%
Labor	James F. Grinnell	94	3.40%	−1.62%
Plurality		82	2.97%	-5.91%
Total votes		2,761	100.0%	-17.43%
Republican hold				

Wisconsin Assembly, Green District Election, 1892
Party	Candidate	Votes	%	±%
General Election, November 8, 1892
Republican	Henry C. Putnam	2,226	44.04%	
Democratic	Gilbert T. Hodge	2,061	40.77%	
Populist	Frank H. Smock	411	8.13%	
Prohibition	William Smiley	357	7.06%	
Plurality		165	3.26%	
Total votes		5,055	100.0%	
Republican win (new seat)				

=== Wisconsin Senate (1894) ===
Wisconsin Senate, 17th District Election, 1894
Party	Candidate	Votes	%	±%
General Election, November 6, 1894
Republican	Henry C. Putnam	7,129	61.40%	+8.31%
Democratic	Edward Drotning	3,214	27.68%	−13.40%
Prohibition	F. R. Derrick	741	6.38%	+0.56%
Populist	E. P. Hassinger	526	4.53%	
Plurality		3,915	33.72%	+21.71%
Total votes		11,610	100.0%	+42.30%
Republican hold				

Wisconsin State Assembly
Preceded by Philip Allen	Member of the Wisconsin State Assembly from the Green–Lafayette 2nd district January 5, 1891 – January 2, 1893	District abolished
District established	Member of the Wisconsin State Assembly from the Green district January 2, 1893 – January 7, 1895	Succeeded by Nathaniel B. Treat
Wisconsin Senate
Preceded by Richard Burdge	Member of the Wisconsin Senate from the 17th district January 7, 1895 – January 2, 1899	Succeeded by Harry C. Martin
