= Nathaniel Foote =

English-born surveyor (1592–1644)

- Born: 21 September 1592; Shalford, Essex, England
- Died: 20 November 1644 (aged 52); Wethersfield, Connecticut, English America
- Occupations: Surveyor; juror; landowner
- Known for: Founder of Wethersfield, Connecticut
- Spouse: Elizabeth Deming
- Children: 7
- Relatives: John Deming (brother-in-law)

Nathaniel Foote (21 September 1592 – 20 November 1644), was an early English immigrant and surveyor to Connecticut. He was part of the settlement party that founded Wethersfield, Connecticut, the oldest town in that state. Foote's wife, Elizabeth, was the sister of John Deming, considered one of the "fathers of Connecticut." In 1635, he surveyed the boundaries between his hometown of Wethersfield and Hartford.

== Notable descendants ==
According to the Foote Family Association of America, there are an estimated one million living United States nationals who are descended from Foote and his wife, Elizabeth Deming.
