= 1956 New Hampshire Republican presidential primary =

- March 13, 1956
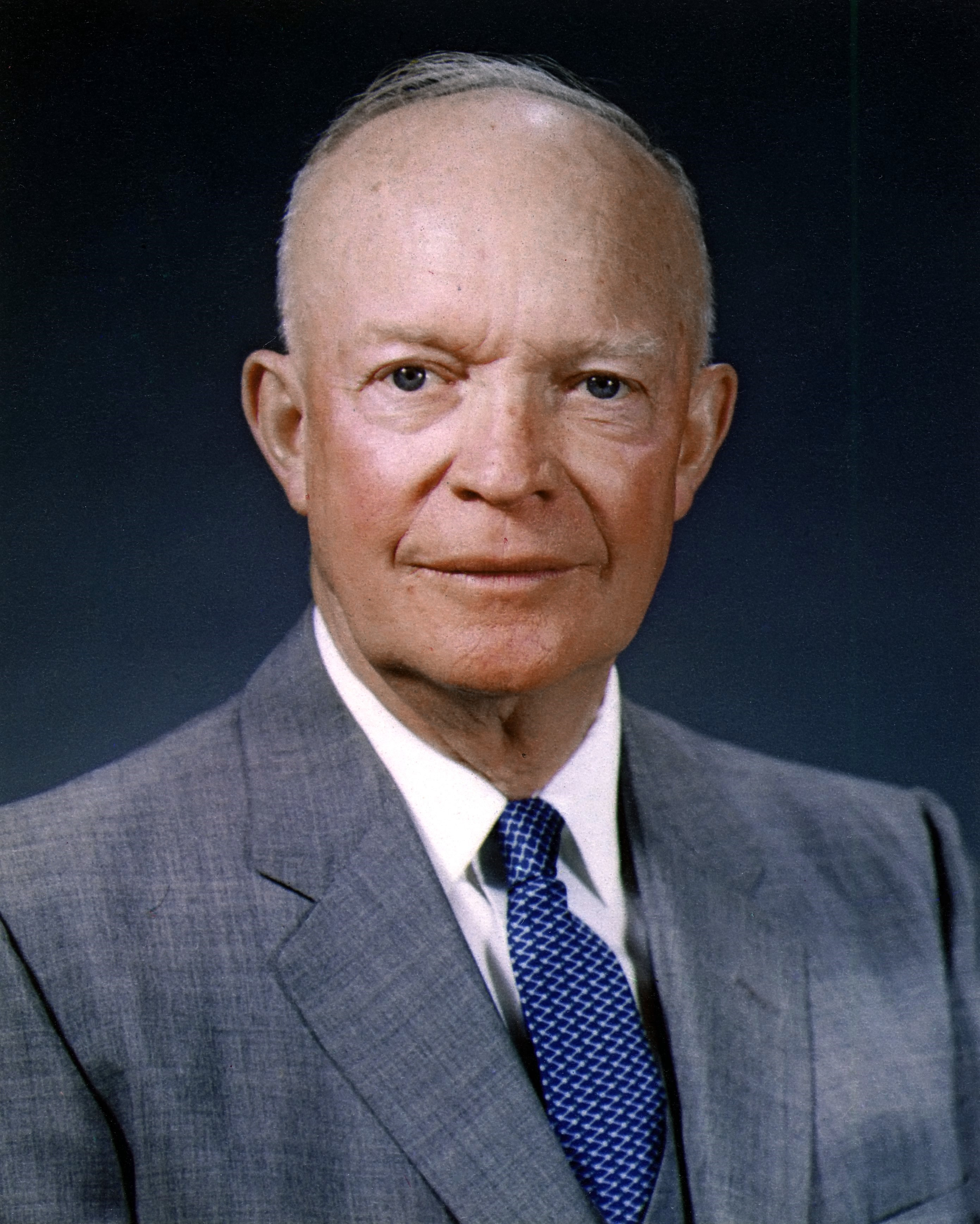
Candidate	Dwight Eisenhower
Home state	Kansas
Delegate count	14
Popular vote	56,464
Percentage	98.9%
- County results Eisenhower

The 1956 New Hampshire Republican presidential primary was held on March 13, 1956, in New Hampshire as one of the Republican Party's statewide nomination contests ahead of the 1956 United States presidential election. Incumbent President Dwight Eisenhower ran unopposed, and won the Granite State by the largest margin in history since the advent of the New Hampshire primary's direct vote for president in 1952.

== Results ==
Primary Results
Candidate	Votes	Percentage	Delegates
Dwight D. Eisenhower	56,464	98.95%	14
Other	600	1.05%	0
Total	57,064	100.00%	14

State Republican chairman William W. Treat helped lead the write-in campaign for Vice President Richard Nixon's renomination, which drew a record write-in vote.
