= Harry C. Martin =

American politician

Harry Chapman Martin
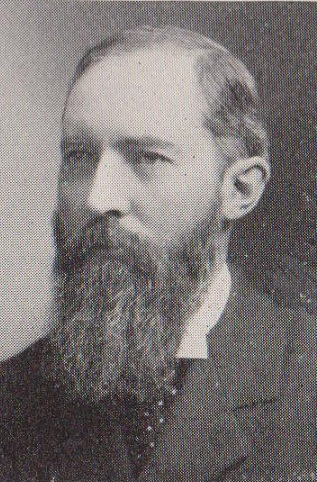

Member of the Wisconsin Senate from the 17th district
- In office 1899–1915
- Preceded by: Henry Putnam
- Succeeded by: Platt Whitman

Wisconsin State Assembly
- In office 1895–1899

Personal details
- Born: December 15, 1854 Lafayette County, Wisconsin USA
- Died: February 25, 1917 (age 62) Darlington, Wisconsin
- Party: Republican
- Spouse: Kittie E. Dodge
- Profession: Attorney

Harry Chapman Martin (1854-1917) was a lawyer, educator and politician from the U.S. State of Wisconsin. He served as mayor of Darlington, and later as a member of the Wisconsin State Assembly and the Wisconsin State Senate.

== Background ==
Martin was born on a farm near Darlington in Lafayette County, Wisconsin on December 15, 1854, and attended a one-room school in the area. His family moved to Darlington when he was nine years old, and he continued in the public school at Darlington, after which he taught school for one year before going on to the University of Wisconsin, from which he graduated in 1879. He studied law, was admitted to the bar in 1881, and commenced a lifelong law practice in Darlington. He also became a director of the Citizens National Bank of Darlington.

== Public office ==
Soon after his admission to the bar he was appointed Lafayette County superintendent of schools; he was twice subsequently elected to that office. In 1887 he was elected mayor of the city of Darlington and was re-elected in 1888. He was city attorney for Darlington for several years, and was elected county district attorney in 1892. Martin was a member of the Republican Party's state central committee for four years; was president of the high school board for Darlington from 1895 until 1910. He was elected from Wisconsin's 1st congressional district as a delegate to the 1908 Republican National Convention held in Chicago, 1908, which nominated William Howard Taft for President of the United States.

=== Legislative office ===
Martin was elected in 1895 to fill a vacancy in the Lafayette County Assembly seat, occasioned by the death of Republican James W. Freeman, but was not a candidate for re-election and was succeeded by George Sheffer, also a Republican. Martin was elected to the 17th State Senate district (part of Rock County (the Towns of Avon, Beloit, Clinton, Newark, Plymouth, Spring Valley, and Turtle, Wisconsin; the Village of Clinton, and the City of Beloit), and all of Green and Lafayette counties) in 1898, succeeding Henry Putnam, with 6,584 votes to 3,794 for Democrat Rinaldo Fleck.

The Senate was re-districted in 1901; the new 17th still included all of Green and Lafayette counties, plus Iowa County; but none of Rock. Martin continued to serve the new 17th; he was re-elected in 1902, 1906 and 1910, in the latter year receiving 5,639 votes to 4,186 for Democrat Thomas H. Arthur, 49 for Prohibitionist J. P. Parnley, and 1 for Socialist E. W. Stewart. He was elected president pro tempore of the Senate in 1911, and again in 1913. Martin was appointed by Governor James O. Davidson as a Senate member of the legislative committee to visit the charitable, penal and reformatory institutions of the state. He was not a candidate for re-election in 1914, and was succeeded by fellow Republican Platt Whitman.

== Personal life and death ==
Chapman married Kittie E. Dodge, born 1858, an alumna of Platteville Normal School; they had one daughter, Anne Dodge Chapman. Chapman died at his home in Darlington on February 25 after a long illness.
