= Frank Murray (politician) =

American politician (1907–1984)

14th Secretary of State of Montana
- In office 1957–1981
- Governor: J. Hugo Aronson; Donald Grant Nutter; Tim Babcock; Forrest H. Anderson; Thomas Lee Judge
- Preceded by: S. C. Arnold
- Succeeded by: Jim Waltermire

Personal details
- Born: February 28, 1907 Silver Bow County, Montana, U.S.
- Died: September 16, 1984 (aged 77)
- Party: Democratic

Frank Murray (February 28, 1907 – September 16, 1984) was an American politician. He served as secretary of state of Montana from 1957 to 1981.

== Life and career ==
Murray was born in Silver Bow County, Montana.

Murray served as secretary of state of Montana from 1957 to 1981.

Murray died in September 1984, at the age of 77.
