= 1956 United States presidential election in Illinois =

- November 6, 1956

All 27 Illinois votes to the Electoral College
- Turnout: 84.47%

| Nominee | Dwight D. Eisenhower | Adlai Stevenson II |
| Party | Republican | Democratic |
| Home state | Pennsylvania (Note: Although he was born in Texas and grew up in Kansas before his military career, at the time of the 1952 election Eisenhower was president of Columbia University and was, officially, a resident of New York. During his first term as president, he moved his private residence to Gettysburg, Pennsylvania, and officially changed his residency to Pennsylvania.) | Illinois |
| Running mate | Richard Nixon | Estes Kefauver |
| Electoral vote | 27 | 0 |
| Popular vote | 2,623,327 | 1,775,682 |
| Percentage | 59.52% | 40.29% |
County results
Eisenhower
50–60%
60–70%
70–80%
Stevenson
40–50%
50–60%
President before election
Dwight D. Eisenhower
Republican
Elected President
Dwight D. Eisenhower
Republican

The 1956 United States presidential election in Illinois took place on November 6, 1956, as part of the 1956 United States presidential election. State voters chose 27 representatives, or electors, to the Electoral College, who voted for president and vice president.

Illinois was won by incumbent President Dwight D. Eisenhower (R–Pennsylvania), running with Vice President Richard Nixon, with 59.52% of the popular vote, against Adlai Stevenson (D–Illinois), running with Senator Estes Kefauver, with 40.29% of the popular vote.

As of 2024, this is the most recent time that a Democratic candidate did not earn at least 1 million votes from Cook County, by far the state's most populous county and home to Chicago, in a presidential election.

== Primaries ==
=== Turnout ===
The primaries and general elections coincided with those for other federal offices (Senate and House), as well as those for state offices.

Turnout in the state-run primary elections (Democratic and Republican) was 31.69% with a total of 1,577,163 votes cast.

Turnout during the general election was 84.47%, with 4,407,407 votes cast. Both major parties held non-binding state-run preferential primaries on April 10.

=== Democratic ===
1956 Illinois Democratic presidential primary
- April 10, 1956
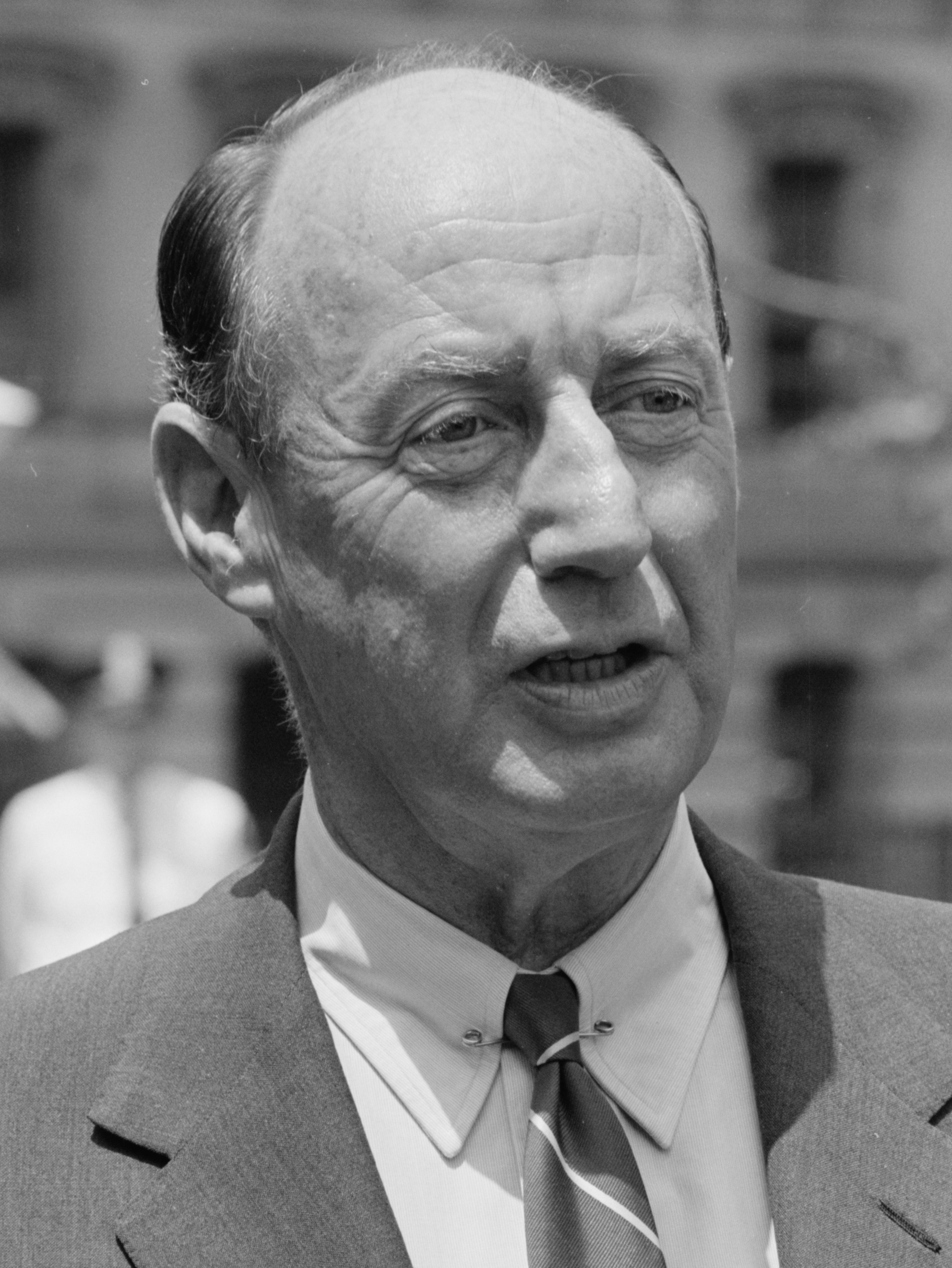
| Candidate | Adlai Stevenson |
| Home state | Illinois |
| Popular vote | 717,742 |
| Percentage | 95.26% |

The 1956 Illinois Democratic presidential primary was held on April 10, 1956, in the U.S. state of Illinois as one of the Democratic Party's state primaries ahead of the 1956 presidential election.

The popular vote was a non-binding "beauty contest". Delegates were instead elected by direct votes by congressional district on delegate candidates.

All candidates besides Adlai Stevenson II, who won a landslide victory, were write-ins.

1956 Illinois Democratic presidential primary
| Candidate | Votes | % |
|---|---|---|
| Adlai E. Stevenson | 717,742 | 95.26 |
| Estes Kefauver (write-in) | 34,092 | 4.53 |
| Frank Lausche (write-in) | 1,146 | 0.15 |
| Stuart Symington (write-in) | 232 | 0.03 |
| Averell Harriman (write-in) | 134 | 0.02 |
| Other write-ins | 128 | 0.02 |
| Total | 753,474 | 100 |

=== Republican ===
1956 Illinois Republican presidential primary
- April 10, 1956
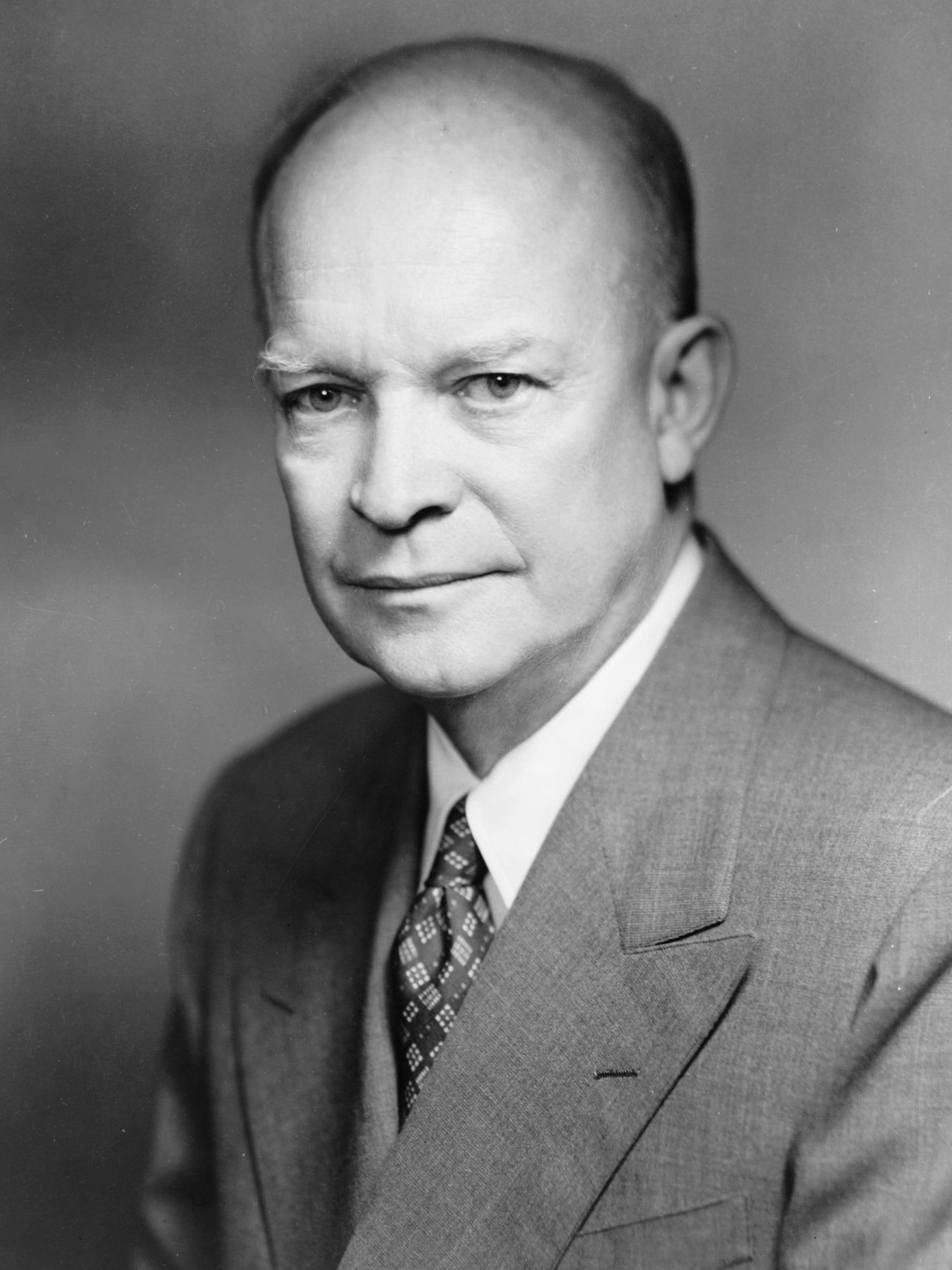
| Candidate | Dwight D. Eisenhower |
| Home state | Kansas |
| Popular vote | 781,710 |
| Percentage | 94.90% |

The 1956 Illinois Republican presidential primary was held on April 10, 1956, in the U.S. state of Illinois as one of the Republican Party's state primaries ahead of the 1956 presidential election.

The preference vote was a "beauty contest". Delegates were instead selected by direct-vote in each congressional districts on delegate candidates.

1956 Illinois Republican presidential primary
| Candidate | Votes | % |
|---|---|---|
| Dwight D. Eisenhower (incumbent) | 781,710 | 94.90 |
| William F. Knowland | 33,534 | 4.07 |
| Lar "America First" Daly | 8,354 | 1.01 |
| Write-ins | 91 | 0.01 |
| Total | 823,689 | 100 |

== Results ==
1956 United States presidential election in Illinois
| Party | Candidate | Votes | % |
|---|---|---|---|
| Republican | Dwight D. Eisenhower (inc.) | 2,623,327 | 59.52% |
| Democratic | Adlai Stevenson | 1,775,682 | 40.29% |
| Socialist Labor | Eric Hass | 8,342 | 0.19% |
| Write-in | Others | 56 | 0.00% |
| Total votes | | 4,407,407 | 100% |

=== Results by county ===
| County | Dwight D. Eisenhower Republican | | Adlai Stevenson Democratic | | Various candidates Other parties | | Margin | | Total votes cast |
| County | # | % | # | % | # | % | # | % | Total votes cast |
|---|---|---|---|---|---|---|---|---|---|
| Adams | 19,569 | 63.12% | 11,402 | 36.78% | 32 | 0.10% | 8,167 | 26.34% | 31,003 |
| Alexander | 4,425 | 51.38% | 4,167 | 48.38% | 21 | 0.24% | 258 | 3.00% | 8,613 |
| Bond | 4,342 | 60.41% | 2,834 | 39.43% | 11 | 0.15% | 1,508 | 20.98% | 7,187 |
| Boone | 6,706 | 77.96% | 1,890 | 21.97% | 6 | 0.07% | 4,816 | 55.99% | 8,602 |
| Brown | 2,026 | 53.67% | 1,748 | 46.30% | 1 | 0.03% | 278 | 7.37% | 3,775 |
| Bureau | 13,909 | 70.56% | 5,781 | 29.33% | 21 | 0.11% | 8,128 | 41.23% | 19,711 |
| Calhoun | 1,892 | 55.79% | 1,498 | 44.18% | 1 | 0.03% | 394 | 11.61% | 3,391 |
| Carroll | 6,503 | 70.60% | 2,693 | 29.24% | 15 | 0.16% | 3,810 | 41.36% | 9,211 |
| Cass | 4,125 | 54.97% | 3,368 | 44.88% | 11 | 0.15% | 757 | 10.09% | 7,504 |
| Champaign | 28,190 | 67.06% | 13,799 | 32.82% | 51 | 0.12% | 14,391 | 34.24% | 42,040 |
| Christian | 10,282 | 52.91% | 9,093 | 46.79% | 59 | 0.30% | 1,189 | 6.12% | 19,434 |
| Clark | 5,451 | 60.74% | 3,519 | 39.21% | 4 | 0.04% | 1,932 | 21.53% | 8,974 |
| Clay | 5,079 | 58.73% | 3,553 | 41.08% | 16 | 0.19% | 1,526 | 17.65% | 8,648 |
| Clinton | 7,378 | 63.46% | 4,242 | 36.48% | 7 | 0.06% | 3,136 | 26.98% | 11,627 |
| Coles | 12,436 | 62.13% | 7,569 | 37.82% | 10 | 0.05% | 4,867 | 24.31% | 20,015 |
| Cook | 1,293,223 | 56.80% | 977,821 | 42.95% | 5,800 | 0.25% | 315,402 | 13.85% | 2,276,844 |
| Crawford | 6,747 | 63.28% | 3,906 | 36.63% | 9 | 0.08% | 2,841 | 26.65% | 10,662 |
| Cumberland | 3,235 | 58.69% | 2,272 | 41.22% | 5 | 0.09% | 963 | 17.47% | 5,512 |
| DeKalb | 15,078 | 75.66% | 4,826 | 24.22% | 25 | 0.13% | 10,252 | 51.44% | 19,929 |
| DeWitt | 5,307 | 63.15% | 3,093 | 36.80% | 4 | 0.05% | 2,214 | 26.35% | 8,404 |
| Douglas | 5,559 | 66.66% | 2,774 | 33.27% | 6 | 0.07% | 2,785 | 33.39% | 8,339 |
| DuPage | 91,834 | 79.76% | 23,103 | 20.06% | 207 | 0.18% | 68,731 | 59.70% | 115,144 |
| Edgar | 7,942 | 64.52% | 4,362 | 35.44% | 5 | 0.04% | 3,580 | 29.08% | 12,309 |
| Edwards | 3,339 | 73.38% | 1,210 | 26.59% | 1 | 0.02% | 2,129 | 46.79% | 4,550 |
| Effingham | 6,904 | 60.67% | 4,455 | 39.15% | 21 | 0.18% | 2,449 | 21.52% | 11,380 |
| Fayette | 6,739 | 57.81% | 4,914 | 42.15% | 5 | 0.04% | 1,825 | 15.66% | 11,658 |
| Ford | 6,027 | 73.66% | 2,152 | 26.30% | 3 | 0.04% | 3,875 | 47.36% | 8,182 |
| Franklin | 11,761 | 50.98% | 11,308 | 49.02% | 0 | 0.00% | 453 | 1.96% | 23,069 |
| Fulton | 12,375 | 58.58% | 8,702 | 41.19% | 48 | 0.23% | 3,673 | 17.39% | 21,125 |
| Gallatin | 2,179 | 49.35% | 2,230 | 50.51% | 6 | 0.14% | -51 | -1.16% | 4,415 |
| Greene | 4,718 | 54.57% | 3,909 | 45.21% | 19 | 0.22% | 809 | 9.36% | 8,646 |
| Grundy | 7,640 | 74.46% | 2,618 | 25.51% | 3 | 0.03% | 5,022 | 48.95% | 10,261 |
| Hamilton | 3,675 | 57.75% | 2,685 | 42.19% | 4 | 0.06% | 990 | 15.56% | 6,364 |
| Hancock | 8,431 | 63.41% | 4,854 | 36.50% | 12 | 0.09% | 3,577 | 26.91% | 13,297 |
| Hardin | 1,919 | 56.93% | 1,444 | 42.84% | 8 | 0.24% | 475 | 14.09% | 3,371 |
| Henderson | 2,743 | 65.08% | 1,469 | 34.85% | 3 | 0.07% | 1,274 | 30.23% | 4,215 |
| Henry | 15,896 | 65.46% | 8,349 | 34.38% | 39 | 0.16% | 7,547 | 31.08% | 24,284 |
| Iroquois | 12,104 | 72.88% | 4,487 | 27.02% | 18 | 0.11% | 7,617 | 45.86% | 16,609 |
| Jackson | 10,526 | 58.72% | 7,391 | 41.23% | 10 | 0.06% | 3,135 | 17.49% | 17,927 |
| Jasper | 3,107 | 51.77% | 2,895 | 48.23% | 0 | 0.00% | 212 | 3.54% | 6,002 |
| Jefferson | 9,637 | 54.36% | 8,090 | 45.64% | 0 | 0.00% | 1,547 | 8.72% | 17,727 |
| Jersey | 4,220 | 55.24% | 3,415 | 44.70% | 5 | 0.07% | 805 | 10.54% | 7,640 |
| Jo Daviess | 6,762 | 69.81% | 2,906 | 30.00% | 18 | 0.19% | 3,856 | 39.81% | 9,686 |
| Johnson | 2,973 | 65.72% | 1,549 | 34.24% | 2 | 0.04% | 1,424 | 31.48% | 4,524 |
| Kane | 56,009 | 72.82% | 20,848 | 27.10% | 59 | 0.08% | 35,161 | 45.72% | 76,916 |
| Kankakee | 21,993 | 66.39% | 11,088 | 33.47% | 47 | 0.14% | 10,905 | 32.92% | 33,128 |
| Kendall | 5,057 | 78.15% | 1,407 | 21.74% | 7 | 0.11% | 3,650 | 56.41% | 6,471 |
| Knox | 18,656 | 66.04% | 9,558 | 33.83% | 37 | 0.13% | 9,098 | 32.21% | 28,251 |
| Lake | 66,781 | 67.33% | 32,279 | 32.54% | 129 | 0.13% | 34,502 | 34.79% | 99,189 |
| LaSalle | 33,461 | 64.52% | 18,318 | 35.32% | 83 | 0.16% | 15,143 | 29.20% | 51,862 |
| Lawrence | 6,104 | 61.89% | 3,751 | 38.03% | 7 | 0.07% | 2,353 | 23.86% | 9,862 |
| Lee | 11,653 | 71.98% | 4,531 | 27.99% | 5 | 0.03% | 7,122 | 43.99% | 16,189 |
| Livingston | 13,939 | 72.82% | 5,197 | 27.15% | 7 | 0.04% | 8,742 | 45.67% | 19,143 |
| Logan | 9,589 | 66.61% | 4,793 | 33.29% | 14 | 0.10% | 4,796 | 33.32% | 14,396 |
| Macon | 27,673 | 54.53% | 23,066 | 45.45% | 8 | 0.02% | 4,607 | 9.08% | 50,747 |
| Macoupin | 12,290 | 49.84% | 12,303 | 49.89% | 66 | 0.27% | -13 | -0.05% | 24,659 |
| Madison | 39,413 | 45.10% | 47,897 | 54.80% | 88 | 0.10% | -8,484 | -9.70% | 87,398 |
| Marion | 10,813 | 55.75% | 8,551 | 44.09% | 32 | 0.16% | 2,262 | 11.66% | 19,396 |
| Marshall | 4,764 | 67.64% | 2,245 | 31.88% | 34 | 0.48% | 2,519 | 35.76% | 7,043 |
| Mason | 4,677 | 58.73% | 3,199 | 40.17% | 88 | 1.10% | 1,478 | 18.56% | 7,964 |
| Massac | 4,265 | 64.18% | 2,359 | 35.50% | 21 | 0.32% | 1,906 | 28.68% | 6,645 |
| McDonough | 9,725 | 71.50% | 3,872 | 28.47% | 5 | 0.04% | 5,853 | 43.03% | 13,602 |
| McHenry | 24,912 | 78.48% | 6,820 | 21.48% | 13 | 0.04% | 18,092 | 57.00% | 31,745 |
| McLean | 25,758 | 67.62% | 12,332 | 32.37% | 5 | 0.01% | 13,426 | 35.25% | 38,095 |
| Menard | 3,188 | 63.44% | 1,833 | 36.48% | 4 | 0.08% | 1,355 | 26.96% | 5,025 |
| Mercer | 5,732 | 65.82% | 2,969 | 34.10% | 7 | 0.08% | 2,763 | 31.72% | 8,708 |
| Monroe | 4,715 | 64.03% | 2,648 | 35.96% | 1 | 0.01% | 2,067 | 28.07% | 7,364 |
| Montgomery | 9,945 | 56.36% | 7,692 | 43.59% | 8 | 0.05% | 2,253 | 12.77% | 17,645 |
| Morgan | 10,262 | 61.82% | 6,327 | 38.11% | 11 | 0.07% | 3,935 | 23.71% | 16,600 |
| Moultrie | 3,756 | 57.65% | 2,751 | 42.23% | 8 | 0.12% | 1,005 | 15.42% | 6,515 |
| Ogle | 13,194 | 78.21% | 3,660 | 21.70% | 16 | 0.09% | 9,534 | 56.51% | 16,870 |
| Peoria | 50,888 | 62.72% | 30,145 | 37.15% | 108 | 0.13% | 20,743 | 25.57% | 81,141 |
| Perry | 6,513 | 57.06% | 4,901 | 42.94% | 0 | 0.00% | 1,612 | 14.12% | 11,414 |
| Piatt | 4,622 | 66.23% | 2,356 | 33.76% | 1 | 0.01% | 2,266 | 32.47% | 6,979 |
| Pike | 5,920 | 52.31% | 5,382 | 47.55% | 16 | 0.14% | 538 | 4.76% | 11,318 |
| Pope | 1,842 | 66.62% | 922 | 33.35% | 1 | 0.04% | 920 | 33.27% | 2,765 |
| Pulaski | 2,966 | 56.74% | 2,246 | 42.97% | 15 | 0.29% | 720 | 13.77% | 5,227 |
| Putnam | 1,724 | 65.28% | 913 | 34.57% | 4 | 0.15% | 811 | 30.71% | 2,641 |
| Randolph | 8,439 | 55.44% | 6,778 | 44.53% | 4 | 0.03% | 1,661 | 10.91% | 15,221 |
| Richland | 5,304 | 68.05% | 2,485 | 31.88% | 5 | 0.06% | 2,819 | 36.17% | 7,794 |
| Rock Island | 31,342 | 51.72% | 29,145 | 48.09% | 118 | 0.19% | 2,197 | 3.63% | 60,605 |
| Saline | 8,481 | 53.96% | 7,215 | 45.91% | 20 | 0.13% | 1,266 | 8.05% | 15,716 |
| Sangamon | 42,951 | 59.71% | 28,949 | 40.24% | 35 | 0.05% | 14,002 | 19.47% | 71,935 |
| Schuyler | 3,068 | 58.22% | 2,189 | 41.54% | 13 | 0.25% | 879 | 16.68% | 5,270 |
| Scott | 2,303 | 60.91% | 1,478 | 39.09% | 0 | 0.00% | 825 | 21.82% | 3,781 |
| Shelby | 7,075 | 56.94% | 5,337 | 42.95% | 13 | 0.10% | 1,738 | 13.99% | 12,425 |
| St. Clair | 41,528 | 42.77% | 55,295 | 56.94% | 283 | 0.29% | -13,767 | -14.17% | 97,106 |
| Stark | 3,241 | 74.32% | 1,118 | 25.64% | 2 | 0.05% | 2,123 | 48.68% | 4,361 |
| Stephenson | 14,245 | 69.10% | 6,349 | 30.80% | 20 | 0.10% | 7,896 | 38.30% | 20,614 |
| Tazewell | 23,690 | 59.27% | 16,230 | 40.61% | 50 | 0.13% | 7,460 | 18.66% | 39,970 |
| Union | 4,204 | 49.06% | 4,359 | 50.87% | 6 | 0.07% | -155 | -1.81% | 8,569 |
| Vermilion | 26,534 | 59.51% | 17,991 | 40.35% | 60 | 0.13% | 8,543 | 19.16% | 44,585 |
| Wabash | 4,425 | 61.92% | 2,713 | 37.97% | 8 | 0.11% | 1,712 | 23.95% | 7,146 |
| Warren | 7,580 | 71.63% | 2,996 | 28.31% | 6 | 0.06% | 4,584 | 43.32% | 10,582 |
| Washington | 5,299 | 65.14% | 2,820 | 34.67% | 16 | 0.20% | 2,479 | 30.47% | 8,135 |
| Wayne | 6,286 | 61.37% | 3,942 | 38.49% | 14 | 0.14% | 2,344 | 22.88% | 10,242 |
| White | 6,128 | 56.13% | 4,778 | 43.77% | 11 | 0.10% | 1,350 | 12.36% | 10,917 |
| Whiteside | 17,589 | 73.95% | 6,158 | 25.89% | 37 | 0.16% | 11,431 | 48.06% | 23,784 |
| Will | 45,628 | 64.34% | 25,188 | 35.52% | 100 | 0.14% | 20,440 | 28.82% | 70,916 |
| Williamson | 13,438 | 56.44% | 10,345 | 43.45% | 27 | 0.11% | 3,093 | 12.99% | 23,810 |
| Winnebago | 48,332 | 62.38% | 29,063 | 37.51% | 89 | 0.11% | 19,269 | 24.87% | 77,484 |
| Woodford | 8,505 | 72.18% | 3,257 | 27.64% | 21 | 0.18% | 5,248 | 44.54% | 11,783 |
| Totals | 2,623,327 | 59.52% | 1,775,682 | 40.29% | 8,398 | 0.19% | 847,645 | 19.23% | 4,407,407 |

==== Counties that flipped from Republican to Democratic ====
- Gallatin
- Union

==== Counties that flipped from Democratic to Republican ====
- Franklin

== See also ==
- United States presidential elections in Illinois
