= Jeremiah Colburn House =

Historic house in Maine, United States

The Jeremiah Colburn House is a historic site located at 68 Main Street in Orono, Maine, United States, which is named for one of Orono's two original settlers, Jeremiah Colburn. The structure was built in 1840 and served as the home and office of Dr. Asa Adams, a renowned family physician in the Town of Orono for over 43 years and after whom the local Asa C. Adams Elementary School is named. Built in the Greek Revival style, it is a contributing property to the Orono Main Street Historic District, which is listed on the National Register of Historic Places, and lies near the Jeremiah Colburn Natural Area.
