= Gov. Israel Washburn House =

Historic house in Maine, United States

- U.S. National Register of Historic Places
- U.S. Historic district – Contributing property
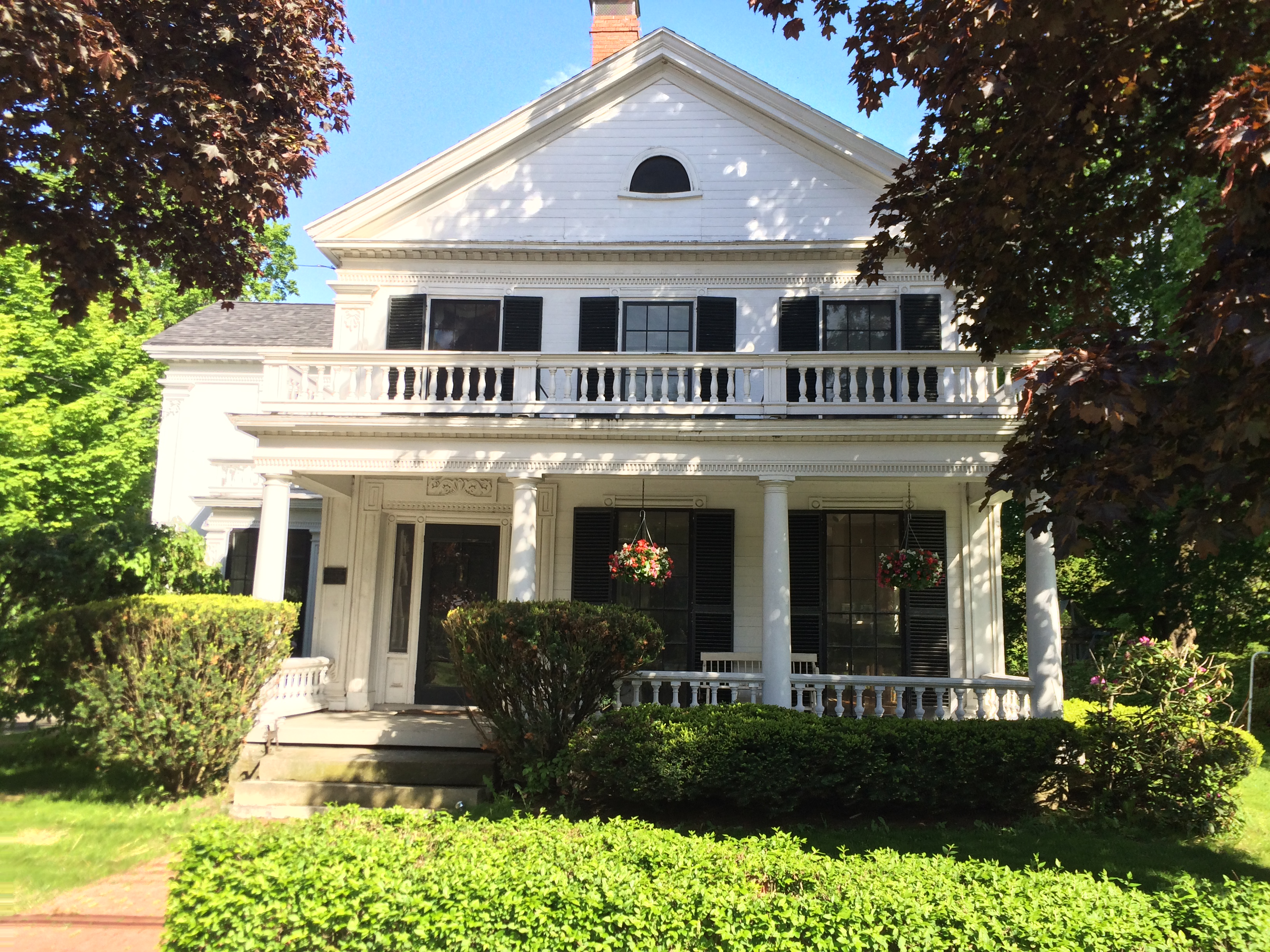
- The Gov. Israel Washburn House in June 2017

- Location within Maine Location within the United States
- Location: 120 Main St., Orono, Maine
- Coordinates: 44°52′37″N 68°40′40″W
- Area: 0 acres (0 ha)
- Built: 1840
- Architectural style: Greek Revival
- Part of: Orono Main Street Historic District (ID77000082)
- NRHP reference No.: 73000144

Significant dates
- Added to NRHP: January 12, 1973
- Designated CP: December 7, 1977

The Gov. Israel Washburn House is a historic house at 120 Main Street in Orono, Maine. Built in 1840, it is architecturally significant as a fine local example of Greek Revival architecture, and is historically significant as the long-time home of Governor of Maine Israel Washburn, Jr. It was listed on the National Register of Historic Places in 1973.

== Description and history ==
The Washburn House is located on the east side of Main Street (United States Route 2), on a residential stretch of that road south of downtown Orono that is lined with 19th-century houses. It is a 2 1/2-story wood-frame structure, with a front-gable roof, and a granite foundation. A two-story gabled wing extends northward from the rear of the main block, and there is a carriage house at the rear of the property. Most of the house is sheathed in clapboards; the front facade and the front-facing part of the wing are finished in flushboarding. The building corners are pilastered, supporting an entablature that rings the house. The front facade has a single-story porch supported by Doric columns, with a low balustrade above. The front facade of the wing has a projecting bay with paneled corners and full-height windows, and is also topped by a balcony with a similar balustrade. Windows on the ground floor of the main facade and south side are full length, with more standard-sized sash windows elsewhere. The entrance is in the left bay of the three-bay front, flanked by sidelight windows and pilasters. The interior retains period woodwork and hardware, including original oak floors with inlaid mahogany, and two fine black marble fireplaces.

The house was built in 1840 by Israel Washburn, Jr., not long after his marriage, and was his home until 1863. Washburn was born into a politically prominent family, entered the legislature in 1851, and served two terms as Governor of Maine during the American Civil War. He was appointed Collector of the Port of Portland by President Abraham Lincoln in 1863, a post he held until his retirement in 1877. He is best known for his prominent and vocal stance against the expansion of slavery.

== See also ==
- National Register of Historic Places listings in Penobscot County, Maine
