= Orono Main Street Historic District =

Historic district in Maine, United States

- U.S. National Register of Historic Places
- U.S. Historic district
- Location within Maine Location within the United States
- Location: Main St. from Maplewood Ave. to Pine St., Orono, Maine
- Coordinates: 44°52′47″N 68°40′31″W
- Area: 26 acres (11 ha)
- Built: 1829
- Architect: Victor Hodgins, Charles Parker Crowell
- Architectural style: Greek Revival, Federal, Late Victorian
- NRHP reference No.: 77000082
- Added to NRHP: December 7, 1977

The Orono Main Street Historic District encompasses a well-preserved collection of predominantly residential 19th century buildings in Orono, Maine. It extends along Main Street's west side between Maplewood Avenue and Goodridge Road, and on the east side between Spencer and Pine Streets. The area was part of Orono's early settlement, and of a period of rapid growth in the first half of the 19th century. The district was listed on the National Register of Historic Places in 1977.

== Description and history ==
The town of Orono was settled in the 1770s, and was incorporated in 1806, named for Joseph Orono, a local Penobscot chief who had recently died. Its population was relatively small until a lumber boom began in the 1820s. This boom continued into the 1840s, and resulted in Orono's most significant period of population growth. Main Street, designated United States Route 2, was during this time period lined with the high-quality homes of its prominent citizens. The historic district includes 29 properties, most of which are Federal or Greek Revival in style, reflecting the popularity of those styles during this period of growth. A few houses were either built in later styles, or were restyled. There are two churches, and two school buildings in the district.

The oldest house in the district is the George Read House at 128 Main Street; it is a Federal period structure, with a portico in the Colonial Revival style added in the 20th century. Other Federal period houses include 143 and 148 Main Street (built 1830 and 1831, respectively), both of which have later Italianate styling applied. The newest buildings in the district are the church and school of St. Mary's Catholic Church; both were designed by Victor Hodgins of Bangor, and were built in 1905 (church) and 1914 (school). The other church in the district is the 1843-44 Greek Revival Universalist Church, and the other school building is a significantly-altered 1820s district schoolhouse at 88 Main Street. Houses associated with prominent individuals include the Gov. Israel Washburn House at 120 Main, built in 1840 by Israel Washburn, Jr., who was Maine's governor during the American Civil War, and the Nathaniel Treat House, built by the owner of several area lumber mills.

== Notable contributing properties ==
- Jeremiah Colburn House

== See also ==
- National Register of Historic Places listings in Penobscot County, Maine
