= Robert Treat =

English-born politician, militia officer and colonial administrator

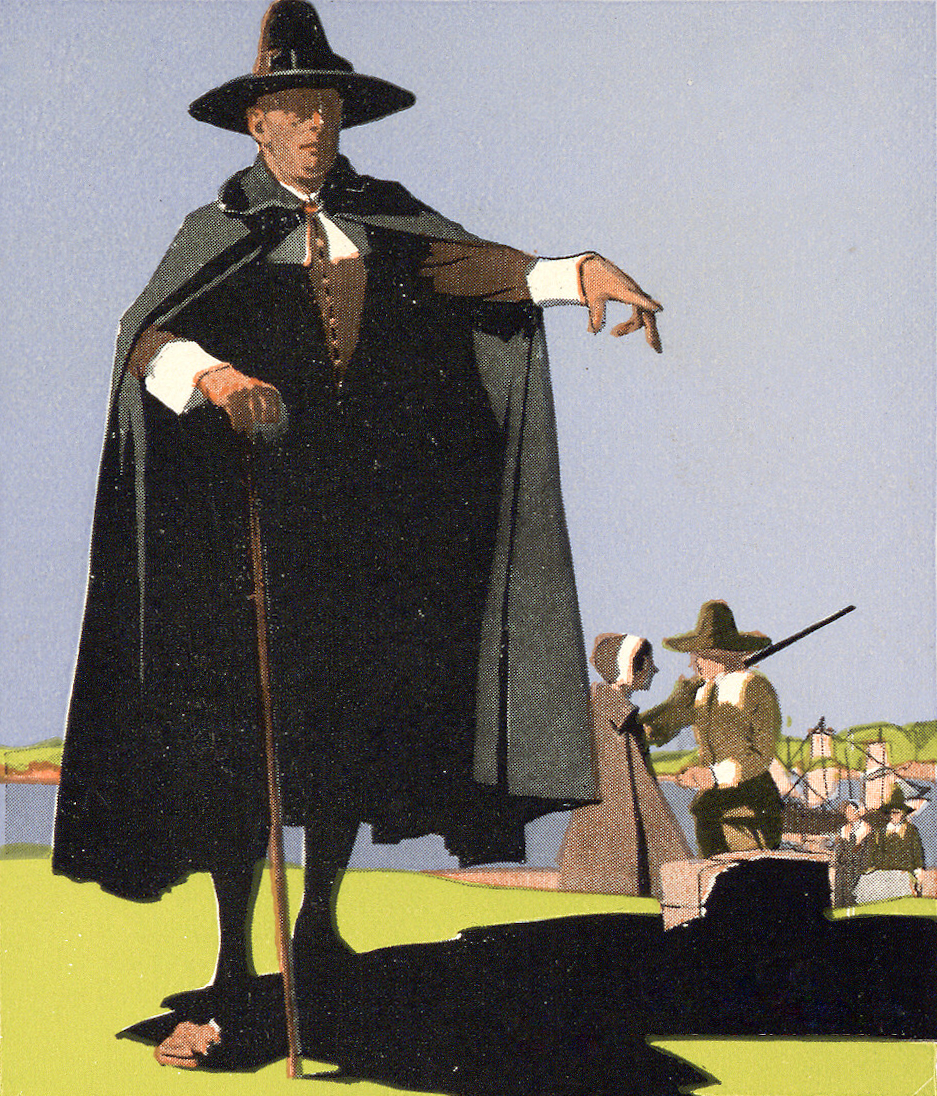
- Portrait by Adolph Treidler, 1916

8th Governor of Connecticut Colony
- In office 1683–1698
- Preceded by: William Leete
- Succeeded by: Fitz-John Winthrop

Personal details
- Born: Robert Trott; February 23, 1622 Pitminster, Somerset, England
- Died: July 12, 1710 (aged 88) Milford, Connecticut, British America
- Spouse: Jane Tapp (m. 1647)
- Parent: Richard Treat (father)
- Relatives: John Deming (brother-in-law)
- Occupation: Politician; militia officer; colonial administrator

Major Robert Treat (né Trott; February 23, 1622 – July 12, 1710) was an English-born politician, militia officer, and colonial administrator who served as the eighth governor of Connecticut Colony from 1683 to 1687 and 1689 to 1698. In 1666, he co-founded the colonial settlement of Newark, New Jersey.

== Early life ==
Robert Treat was born on February 23, 1622 in Pitminster, Somerset and emigrated to the Massachusetts Bay Colony with his family in 1630. His father was Richard Treat and his mother was Alice Gaylord. In 1637, his family were early settlers at Wethersfield, Connecticut. He settled in Milford, Connecticut in 1639 and became one of the leaders of the New Haven Colony, serving in the General Court as its assembly was known.

On Christmas Day, 1647 he married Jane Tapp in Milford, with whom he had eight children. Jane died on October 31, 1703. He then married Mrs. Elizabeth (Powell) Bryan, the daughter of Elder Michael and Abigail Powell of Boston, on October 24, 1705. She was twice widowed before marrying Gov. Treat. She died on January 10, 1706.

== Career ==
When the Connecticut Charter of 1662 forced the New Haven Colony to merge with Connecticut in 1665, Treat led a group of dissidents who left the colony. They moved to New Jersey in 1666 where they were joined by other dissidents from Branford, Connecticut, another part of the former New Haven Colony. The dissidents from Branford were led by Abraham Pierson, the elder. Treat wanted the new community to be named Milford. Pierson, a devout Puritan, preferred the name New Ark, and this place is now known as Newark. Treat returned to Milford, Connecticut in 1672 and lived there the rest of his life.

Treat headed the colony's militia for several years, principally against the Narragansett people. This included participating in King Philip's War in 1676, where he was named Commander-in-Chief of Connecticut's forces. Treat, for example, had a crucial role in fighting that took place near Deerfield, Massachusetts, along with 300 Connecticut militiamen. He also took part in the Great Swamp Fight, one of the bloodiest battles of the war, against the Narragansetts. He served on the Governor's Council continuously from 1676 to 1708.

First elected Governor in 1683, Treat was supplanted by Sir Edmund Andros in 1687, making Connecticut part of the Dominion of New England. Treat is credited with having a role in concealing the state's charter in the Charter Oak, and resumed his job as governor when the dominion scheme fell apart in 1689. He was re-elected annually until being defeated by Fitz-John Winthrop in 1698.

== Death ==
Treat died in Milford, New Haven County, Connecticut, on July 12, 1710. He is interred at Milford Cemetery in Connecticut.

== Notable descendants ==
His descendants include:

- Robert Treat Paine (1731–1814), signer of the Declaration of Independence
- Thomas Greenleaf (1755–1798), printer and newspaper publisher in New York
- Israel Crane (1758–1848), merchant in Cranetown (present-day Montclair, NJ)
- James Freeman (1759–1835), minister of King's Chapel, Boston
- Robert Treat Paine Jr. (1773–1811), poet
- Nathaniel Treat (1798–1894), politician
- Sidney Mason Stone (1803–1882), architect, through his mother, Polly Woodruff
- Charles Henry Davis (1807–1877), rear admiral in the United States Navy
- Samuel Treat (1815–1902), federal judge
- George Treat (1819–1907), California Gold Rush–era pioneer
- Robert Treat Paine (1835–1910), lawyer and philanthropist
- Joseph B. Treat (1836–1919), politician
- Hiram Batchelder (1838–1911), California educator and politician
- Nathaniel B. Treat (1839–1930), politician
- Lorenzo Dow Baker (1840–1908), sea captain and pioneer of the banana trade
- Charles H. Treat (1842–1910), Treasurer of the United States from 1905 to 1909
- Margaret Sidney (1844–1924) author of Five Little Peppers children's series.
- Thomas Edison (1847–1931), inventor
- Charles Treat (1859–1941), general
- Charles W. Woodworth (1865–1940), entomologist
- Treat Williams (1951–2023), Actor/Director/Singer/Pilot
- William W. Treat, lawyer, judge, banker, and Republican Party Official from New Hampshire.

Political offices
Preceded by William Leete	Governor of the Connecticut Colony; 1683–87	Succeeded by Sir Edmund Andros as Governor of the Dominion of New England
Preceded by Sir Edmund Andros as Governor of the Dominion of New England	Governor of the Connecticut Colony; 1689–98	Succeeded by Fitz-John Winthrop
