= Church End, Essex =

Church End may refer to one of several hamlets in Essex, England:

- Church End, Chelmsford, in the parish of Great and Little Leighs
- Church End, Great Dunmow
- Church End, Broxted
- Church End, Shalford
- Church End, Ashdon

== See also ==
- Churchend, Foulness Island
