= Church End, Bedfordshire =

Church End is the name of several ancient hamlets (or "Ends" in local parlance) located in Bedfordshire:

- Church End, Kensworth – 51.85°N 00.50°W TL0318
- Church End, Totternhoe – 51.87°N 00.56°W SP9921
- Church End, Milton Bryan – 51.97°N 00.57°W SP9832
- Church End, Arlesey – 52.01°N 00.26°W TL1937
- Church End, Husborne Crawley – 52.01°N 00.61°W SP9536
- Church End, Tempsford – 52.16°N 00.30°W TL1653
- Church End, Ravensden – 52.17°N 00.43°W TL0754
- Church End, Renhold – 52.16°N 00.41°W TL0875
- Church End, Thurleigh – 52.21°N 00.46°W TL0558

== See also ==
- Haynes Church End
- Church End (disambiguation)
