= Church End, Hertfordshire =

Church End may refer to one of several hamlets in Hertfordshire, England:

- Church End, East Hertfordshire, in the parish of Little Hadham
- Church End, North Hertfordshire, in the parish of Weston
- Church End, Redbourn
- Church End, Three Rivers, in the parish of Sarratt
