= Charles Treat =

American major general

Charles Gould Treat
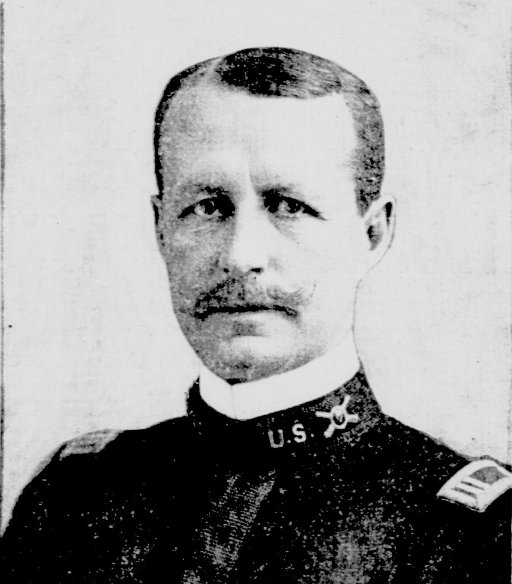
- Treat as a Captain in 1901
- Born: December 30, 1859; Dexter, Maine
- Died: October 11, 1941 (aged 81); Washington, D.C.
- Burial place: West Point Cemetery
- Military career
- Allegiance: United States of America
- Branch: United States Army
- Service years: 1882–1922
- Rank: Major general
- Nickname: Jim
- Commands: Hawaiian Department; 37th Infantry Division; Western Department; U.S. Military Mission to Italian Army; Fort Stotsenburg
- Conflicts: American Indian Wars; Spanish–American War; World War I
- Awards: Distinguished Service Medal (U.S. Army)

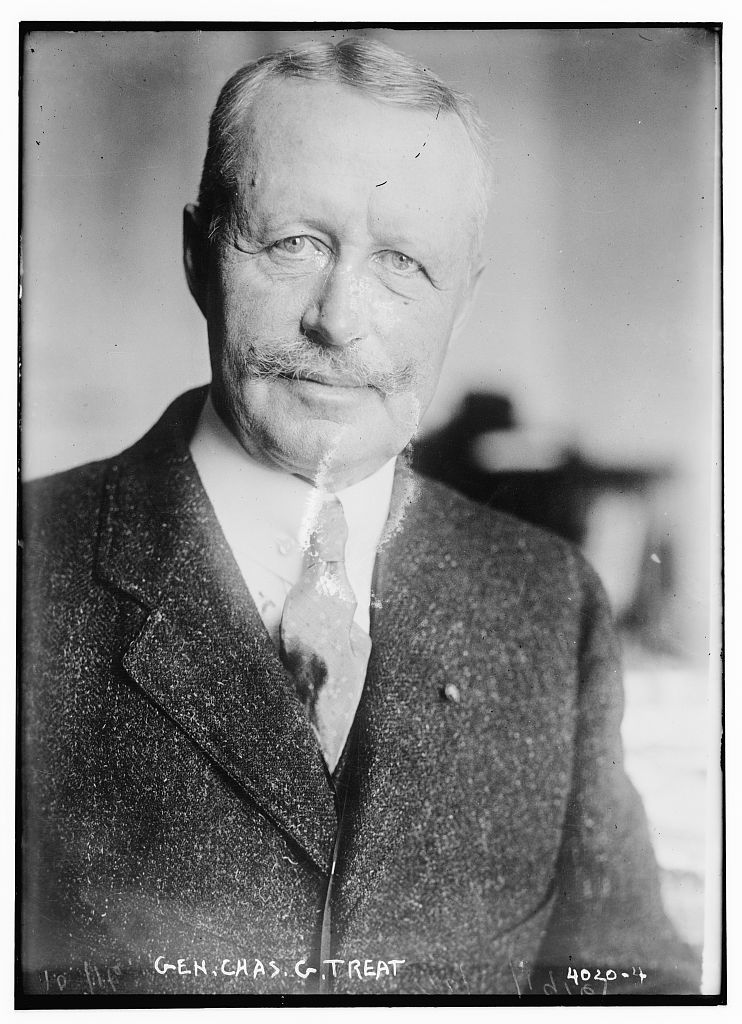
Treat in 1916

Charles Gould Treat (December 30, 1859 – October 11, 1941) was a major general in the United States Army.

== Biography ==
Charles Gould Treat was born in Dexter, Maine, on December 30, 1859, and was a direct descendant of Governor Robert Treat. He was raised in Monroe, Wisconsin, and graduated from Monroe High School in 1878. His father, Joseph B. Treat, was a member of the Wisconsin State Senate and Chairman of the Republican State Central Committee and his grandfather, Nathaniel Treat, was a member of the Maine House of Representatives. Treat graduated, 13th in a class of 37, from the United States Military Academy in 1882, and was commissioned a second lieutenant of Artillery.

He attended Columbia Law School in 1884 and 1885, while stationed at Fort Schuyler.

== Early military career ==
Treat served in Artillery assignments in the United States, including postings to the western states during the American Indian Wars and duty as aide-de-camp to Oliver O. Howard. During the Spanish–American War he served in Cuba as Assistant Adjutant of an Artillery brigade. From 1901 to 1905 he served as Commandant of Cadets at West Point. Treat was inspector general for US forces in Cuba from 1906 to 1908. In 1910 he graduated from the United States Army War College.

== Later military career ==
Treat served on the Army's General Staff for several years, and commanded the Hawaiian Department in 1917.

== World War I ==
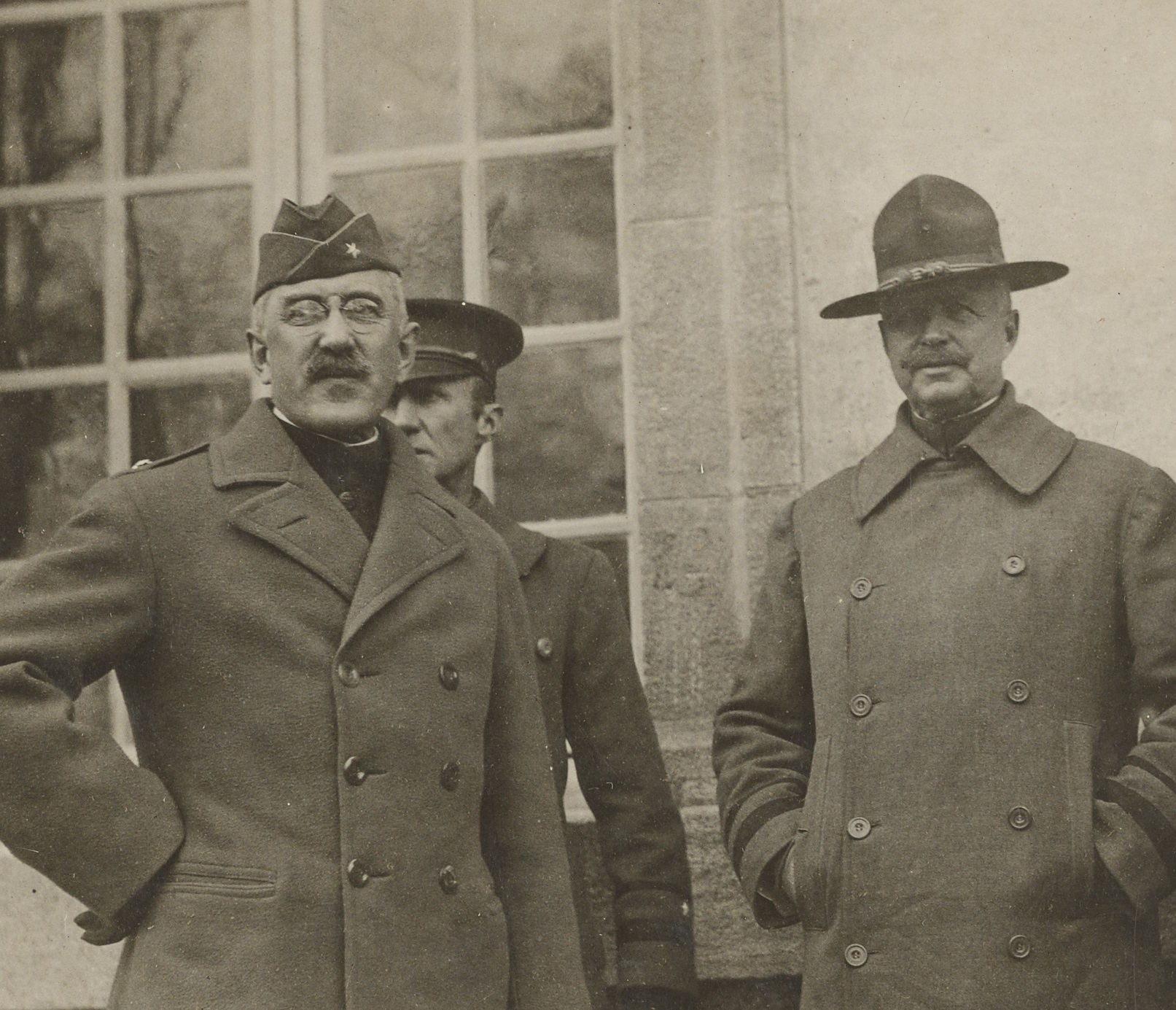
Avery D. Andrews (left) with fellow generals George Moseley and Charles Treat in 1918.

During World War I Treat commanded the 37th Infantry Division at Camp Sheridan, near Montgomery, Alabama, receiving temporary promotion to major general. In 1918 he was assigned to command the Western Department, stationed at Fort Mason, California.

He was chief of the U.S. Military Mission to the Italian Army from 1918 to 1919, and took part in the Battle of Vittorio Veneto.

== Post–World War I ==
After the war Treat returned to his permanent rank of brigadier general and served as commander of Fort Stotsenburg, Philippines, remaining on active duty until retiring in 1922.

In 1930 he was promoted to major general on the retired list.

== Awards ==
Treat received the Army Distinguished Service Medal for his World War I service. He was also a recipient of the Order of the White Eagle (Serbia) with swords and the Italian Order of Saints Maurice and Lazarus.

His Distinguished Service Medal citation reads:

The President of the United States of America, authorized by Act of Congress, July 9, 1918, takes pleasure in presenting the Army Distinguished Service Medal to Brigadier General Charles G. Treat, United States Army, for exceptionally meritorious and distinguished services to the Government of the United States, in a duty of great responsibility during World War I. As Chief of the American Military Mission to Italy and Commanding Base Section No. 8, by his untiring devotion to duty, loyalty, and zeal, General Treat performed his intricate duties with marked ability and sound judgment. By his cheerfulness and sound diplomatic ability he furthered those cordial relations which existed between the American and Italian troops, and was an important factor in maintaining the morale at a high state of efficiency during the trying days prior to the armistice.

== Death and burial ==
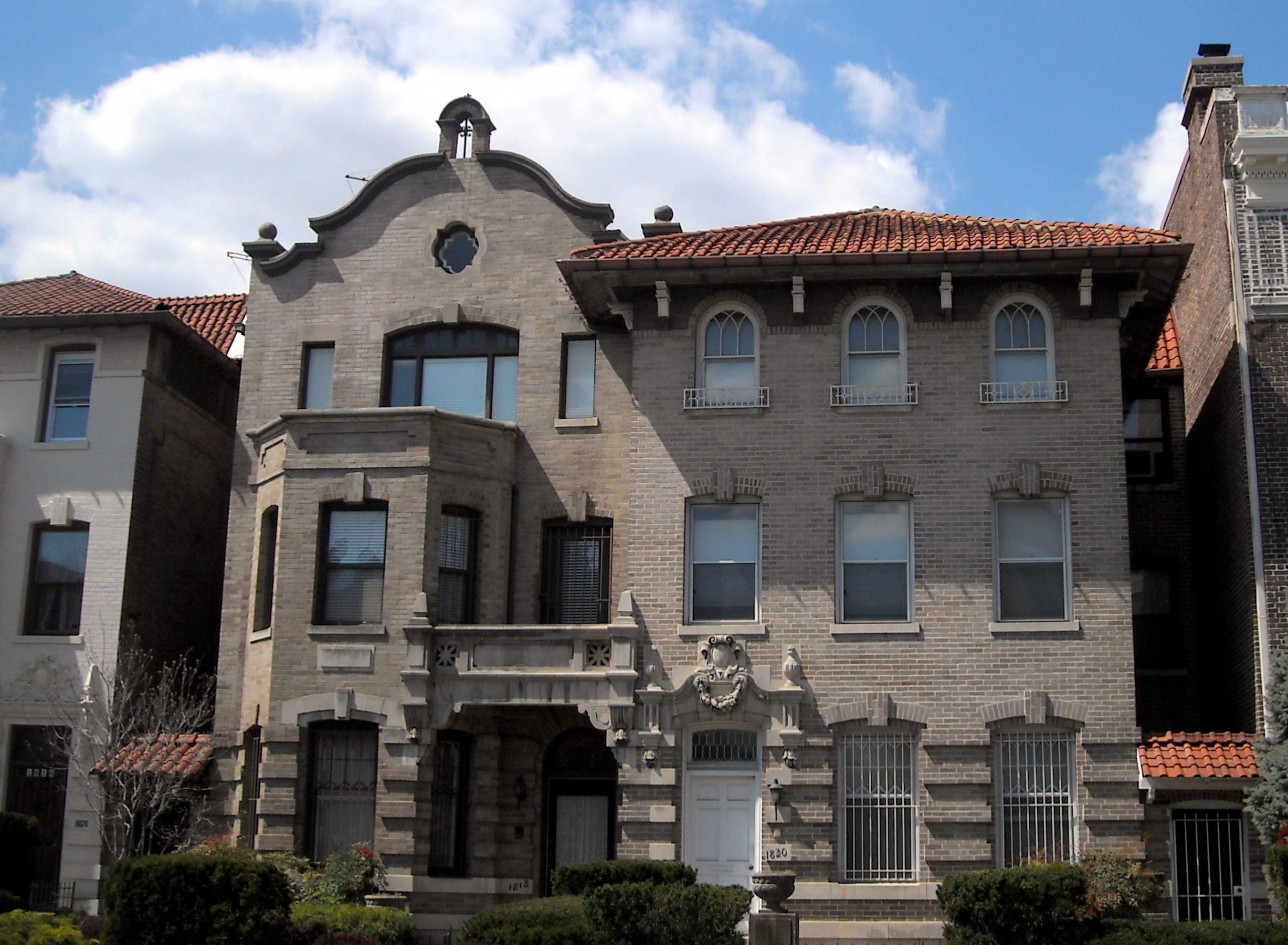
Treat's former residence (left) in the Dupont Circle residence of Washington, D.C.

Treat resided in Washington, D.C., and died at Walter Reed Army Medical Center on October 11, 1941. He is buried at West Point Cemetery, Section 1, Site B-25.

== Family ==
In 1889 Treat married Margaret Louise Cornell, the daughter of John Black Cornell, a wealthy New York City businessman. She died in 1921, and he later married Edith Pennington, the widow of Lieutenant Colonel Godfrey MacDonald (1858–1918) and daughter of Alexander Cummings McWhorter Pennington Jr.

Treat's son Joseph Bradford Treat, son-in-law Archibald Vincent Arnold, grandson Archibald Vincent Arnold Jr., and great-grandson Archibald Vincent Arnold III all graduated from West Point.
