= William W. Treat =

U.S. politician

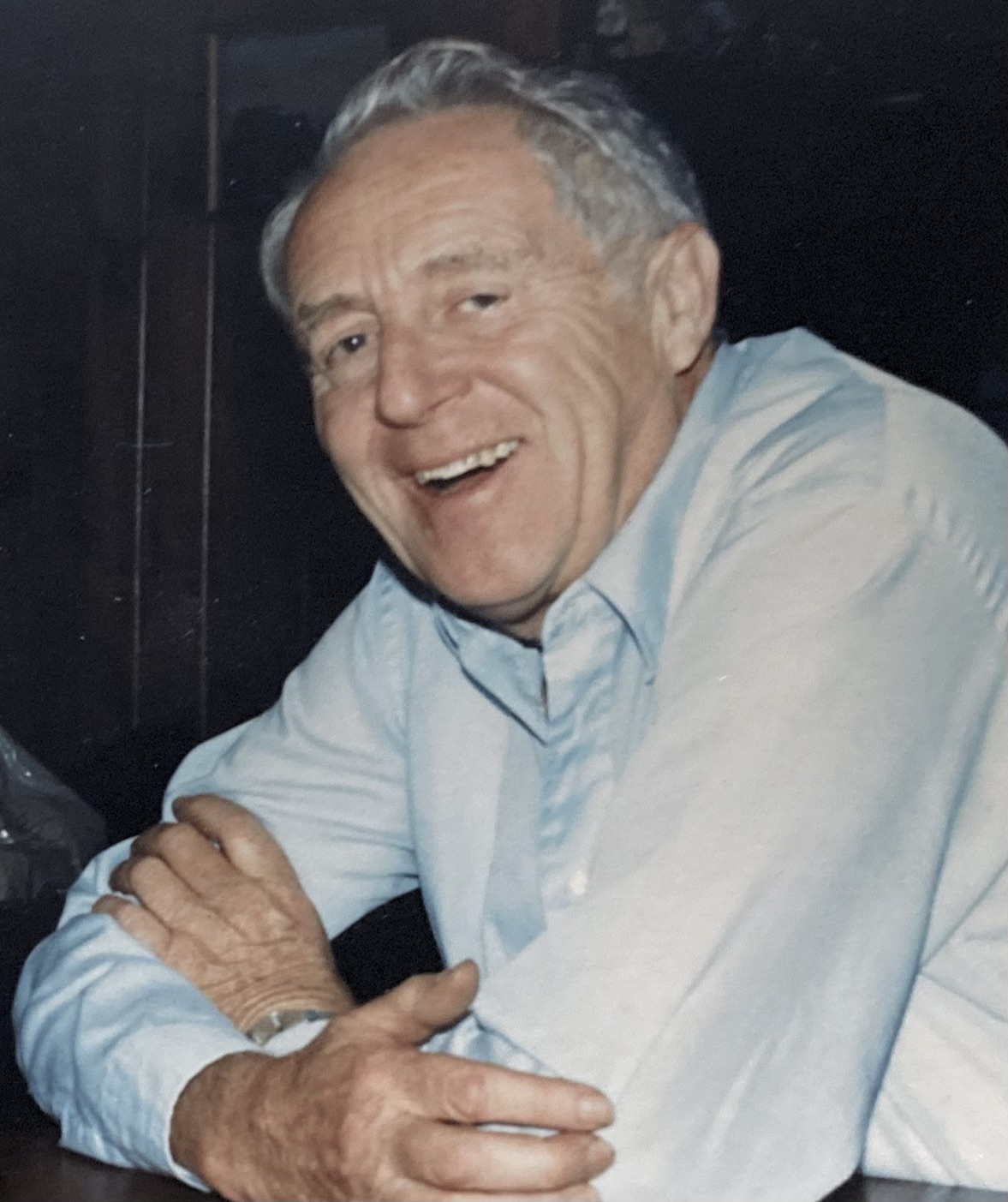
- Treat in later life

Chair of the New Hampshire Republican Party
- In office 1954–1958

Secretary of the United States Electoral College
- In office 1956–1964

Personal details
- Born: William Wardwell Treat; May 23, 1918 Winterport, Maine, U.S.
- Died: January 10, 2010 (aged 91) Naples, Florida, U.S.
- Party: Republican
- Spouse: Vivian S. Baker
- Children: Jonathan B. Treat II; Mary Esther C. Treat
- Education: University of Maine; Harvard Business School; Boston University School of Law
- Occupation: Lawyer, judge, banker

William Wardwell Treat (May 23, 1918 – January 10, 2010) was an American lawyer, judge, banker, and Republican Party official from New Hampshire. He served as chairman of the New Hampshire Republican Party from 1954 to 1958, as a member of the Republican National Committee from 1960 to 1964, and as secretary of the United States Electoral College from 1956 to 1964. A probate judge for 25 years, he founded the National College of Probate Judges and authored the three-volume legal treatise Treat on Probate. Later in life, by appointment of Presidents Ronald Reagan and George H. W. Bush, he served as a United States delegate to the United Nations General Assembly and as the U.S. member of a United Nations human-rights sub-commission in Geneva, which named him a special rapporteur.

== Early life and education ==
Treat was born on May 23, 1918, in Winterport, Maine, the son of Joshua and Clara (Atwood) Treat. He was a direct descendant of Robert Treat, colonial governor of Connecticut, and a collateral descendant of Robert Treat Paine, a signer of the Declaration of Independence. He graduated from the University of Maine and the Harvard Graduate School of Business Administration, and studied law at the Boston University School of Law, which later presented him with its Silver Shingle Award, the school's highest alumni honor, in 1991.

== Political career ==
Treat served as chairman of the New Hampshire Republican Party from 1954 to 1958 and as a member of the Republican National Committee from 1960 to 1964. He was secretary of the United States Electoral College from 1956 to 1964, and a delegate to the Republican National Conventions of 1956, 1960, 1964, and 1988, chairing the program committee of the 1964 Republican National Convention in San Francisco.

Treat had assisted Sherman Adams in organizing New Hampshire's 1952 primary campaign for Dwight D. Eisenhower. Treat's term as state chairman coincided with the 1956 New Hampshire Republican presidential primary, in which Vice President Richard Nixon drew a large write-in vote for renomination; the result was reported nationally as a measure of his standing amid speculation that he might be dropped from President Dwight D. Eisenhower's ticket. With no vice-presidential line on the primary ballot, Treat and Governor Lane Dwinell urged New Hampshire Republicans to write Nixon in, and Treat passed word through his party organization that Nixon deserved renomination; he had told the Associated Press on March 2 that he considered Nixon "well-qualified". More than 22,000 voters wrote in Nixon's name—a record write-in that far outran the nearest alternative, Governor Christian Herter—after which Treat publicly called the outcome a mandate for Nixon, and Nixon telephoned to thank him. In a letter read at the 1984 dinner held in his honor, former President Nixon wrote that Treat "played a decisive role in my political career when he led the campaign for the unprecedented write-in vote I received in the New Hampshire primary in 1956." Nixon added that, although write-in campaigns for president had occurred before, "this was the first time one took place for Vice President," and that the vote "took the steam out of the dump Nixon movement and assured my place on the ticket." During the 1964 New Hampshire Republican presidential primary—won by Henry Cabot Lodge Jr. as a write-in candidate while he was serving as U.S. ambassador in Saigon—Treat was New Hampshire's Republican national committeeman. According to Treat's biographer Merle Drown, in December 1963 Lodge's son George asked Treat—a national committeeman regarded as knowledgeable about New Hampshire politics—to travel secretly to Saigon to determine whether the ambassador would accept a draft for the presidency. Treat met Lodge over Christmas 1963 and reported that, although Lodge would not actively campaign, he was genuinely interested in the nomination; the organizers of the Draft Lodge effort treated the report as a green light for a write-in. Bound by his neutrality as national committeeman, Treat took no part in the write-in campaign itself, which a group of volunteers carried to victory in the March 1964 primary. Treat declined to seek another term on the Republican National Committee in 1964, after the New Hampshire Supreme Court recommended that non-elected judges abstain from partisan politics.

== Judicial career ==
Treat was appointed a judge of probate in New Hampshire in 1958 and served until his retirement in 1983. To improve the administration of probate law nationally, he organized the National College of Probate Judges in 1968 and served as its first president; the organization, headquartered in Williamsburg, Virginia, grew to more than 600 members. The college's William W. Treat Award, named in his honor, has been presented to recipients including U.S. Supreme Court Justice Sandra Day O'Connor, to whom Treat presented it in 1983.

In New Hampshire, Treat chaired the New Hampshire Judicial Council and wrote the three-volume treatise Treat on Probate. He was the first chairman of the Administrative Committee for District and Municipal Courts and authored the study Local Justice in the Granite State, which led to a reorganization and consolidation of the state's local court system.

== Business career ==
After earning his M.B.A. and declining an offer from the Ford Motor Company, Treat opened a seasonal roadside gift shop in Seabrook, New Hampshire, in the late 1940s, naming it Perry's Nut House after his family's store in Belfast, Maine. He drew tourists with a display of taxidermied animals acquired from a former Barnum & Bailey circus collection, which he called the Animarium; the business proved profitable and supported him while he established his law practice, and he later sold it at a profit.

Treat was the founder and chairman of Bank Meridian, a national bank with offices in Portsmouth, Exeter, Hampton, and other New Hampshire seacoast communities, which was sold in 1985 to Amoskeag Bank Shares of Manchester, New Hampshire. In 1983 Treat was elected to the board of directors of the Federal Reserve Bank of Boston on the recommendation of its president, Frank Morris; he was the board's only member from New Hampshire and served during the chairmanship of Paul Volcker. He was also chairman of Towle Manufacturing Company of Newburyport, Massachusetts and a director of Colonial Group, Inc. of Boston.

== Human rights work ==
By appointment of President Ronald Reagan in 1987 and President George H. W. Bush in 1990, Treat served as a United States public delegate to the United Nations General Assembly, where he worked on the assembly's Third Committee, which handles international human-rights questions. In 1988 he was elected the United States member of the United Nations Sub-Commission on Prevention of Discrimination and Protection of Minorities at the Human Rights Centre in Geneva, Switzerland. In 1990 the sub-commission named him a special rapporteur to prepare a study on international standards for a fair trial, with emphasis on the non-derogability of the right to habeas corpus; his report was completed in 1994 and approved by the Human Rights Commission in 1995.

== Honors and legacy ==
In February 1984, Senate Majority Leader Bob Dole delivered the remarks at a dinner held in Treat's honor in Manchester, New Hampshire, describing his quarter-century careers as a probate judge and political figure. Treat received honorary Doctor of Laws degrees from the University of Maine and the University of New Hampshire (2001). In 1988, Plymouth State College awarded him the Granite State Citizen Award for outstanding citizenship. He established the Treat Scholarship at the University of Maine for students in need.

Treat was a member of the Society of the Cincinnati and the Society of Mayflower Descendants, a former governor of the Society of Colonial Wars, a governor of the American Independence Museum in Exeter, and a former trustee of Franklin Pierce College.

In 2018, the University of New Hampshire established the Judge William W. Treat Fellowship in his memory. The program trains undergraduate students to facilitate conversations across political and personal differences, reflecting Treat's reputation for hosting gatherings that brought together guests of widely differing political views.

== Personal life and death ==
Treat married Vivian S. Baker of Providence, Rhode Island. They had two children, Jonathan B. Treat II and Mary Esther C. Treat. Treat lived in Stratham, New Hampshire, and Naples, Florida. He died of a heart attack at Naples Community Hospital on January 10, 2010, at the age of 91.

== Works cited ==
- Drown, Merle (2009). In the Arena: Life and Times of William W. Treat. Brookline, New Hampshire: Hobblebush Books. ISBN 978-0-9801672-3-8.
