= Philip Allen (Wisconsin politician) =

American politician

Philip Allen (December 2, 1832 – March 21, 1915) was a member of the Wisconsin State Assembly.

== Biography ==
Allen was born on December 2, 1832, in Monroe County, Ohio; sources have differed on the exact location. Later, he resided in Elkhart, Indiana, and eventually Cadiz, Wisconsin, where he lived on a farm. He died on March 21, 1915.

== Political career ==
Allen was a member of the Assembly in 1889. Other positions he held include town superintendent of schools and town clerk of Cadiz. He was a Republican.
