= Nathaniel Treat =

American politician

Nathaniel Treat, Sr. (December 29, 1798 – February 4, 1894) was a member of the Maine House of Representatives.

== Biography ==
Treat was born in Frankfort, Maine on December 29, 1798. He was a descendant of Robert Treat. In 1823, Treat married Mary P. Parker. They had ten children, including Joseph B. Treat, who became a member of the Wisconsin State Senate and chairman of the Republican State Central Committee. Treat built sawmills, served as a bank president, and became involved in the lumber industry. His former home in Orono, Maine, now known as the Nathaniel Treat House, is listed on the National Register of Historic Places. In 1870, Treat moved to Monroe, Wisconsin, where he died on February 4, 1894. His grandson, Charles Treat, became a major general in the United States Army. Treat and his family were Universalists.

== Political career ==
Treat was a member of the House of Representatives in 1834. In addition, he was First Selectman of Orono. He was a Democrat.
