= Adam Clarke Dodge =

American businessman and politician

Adam Clarke Dodge (November 6, 1834 – February 14, 1916) was an American businessman and politician.

Dodge was born in the town of Barre, Vermont. He went to the Barre public schools and to the Barre Academy. In 1854, Dodge moved to Monroe, Green County, Wisconsin. He was a dealer in coal, grain, and lumber. Dodge served on the Green County Board of Supervisors and was chairman of the county board. He also served on the board of education and was chairman of the school board. Clark was involved with the Republican Party. Dodge served in the Wisconsin Assembly from 1899 to 1903. He died from heart problems in Monroe, Wisconsin.
