= S. C. Arnold =

American politician

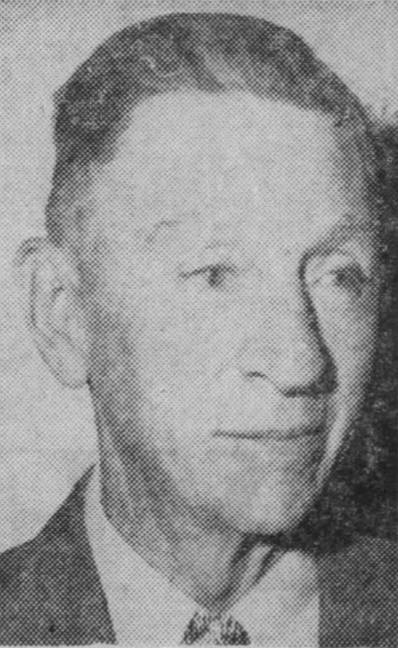
Great Falls Tribune, April 27, 1956

S. C. (Steve) Arnold (March 29, 1884 – March 21, 1961) was a longtime legislator in the state of Montana who served as Montana Secretary of State from 1955 to 1957. A Republican, Arnold supported Dwight D. Eisenhower and won the 1956 Montana GOP presidential primary in Eisenhower’s stead, as a “favorite son” candidate.

== Early life ==
Arnold was born March 29, 1884, in Moundridge, Kansas. He received a bachelor's degree from McPherson College and a master's degree and doctorate in pharmacy from Valparaiso University, and later taught at Chicago Business College.

In 1908, Arnold served as a Kansas delegate to the Republican National Convention, which nominated William Howard Taft for president. (Forty years later, he would lead the Montana delegation at the 1948 GOP convention which nominated Thomas E. Dewey.)

He came to Montana in 1915, buying a ranch in Stillwater County, and later won office as a school trustee. He was elected to the Montana House of Representatives in 1926, and was nominated as Frank W. Hazelbaker’s running mate in the 1932 Montana gubernatorial election; Hazelbaker lost a close race to incumbent Democrat John E. Erickson. In 1934, Arnold was elected to the first of four terms in the Montana Senate; altogether, he would serve for 22 years as a legislator in Helena. (As Senate president, he occasionally served as Acting Governor between sessions.) In 1950, then 66 years old, Arnold retired to the Flathead Valley.

== Secretary of State ==
On June 24, 1955, longtime Secretary of State Sam W. Mitchell died after a long illness; the 83-year-old Mitchell, who had been first elected in 1932, served for over 22 years. Five days later, Republican Governor J. Hugo Aronson appointed the now 71-year-old Arnold (who had been president of the Aronson for Governor committee in 1952) to the job. By making Arnold Secretary of State, Aronson gave the GOP a 2-1 advantage in what was then the state’s main administrative agency, the Board of Examiners (with Attorney General Arnold H. Olsen the only Democrat).

== Favorite son ==
In 1956, incumbent President Dwight Eisenhower was easily re-nominated by the Republicans, and chose not to compete in the June 5 primaries in South Dakota and Montana. In South Dakota, Governor Joe Foss served as Ike’s stand-in, and Arnold did the same for the president in Montana. In what was the first presidential primary in Montana since 1924, Arnold received 86 percent of the tally, with the rest going to perennial candidate Lar Daly and to Eisenhower himself, who got over 300 write-in votes.

He chose not to run again for Secretary of State in 1956, and was replaced by Democrat Frank Murray, who stayed in office for 24 years; thus, Arnold was the only Republican to hold the job in nearly half a century, from 1933-81.

== Personal life ==
Arnold was married to the former Laura Witt, of Kansas, and they had one son, Benjamin, who later took over running the family ranch.

In 1961, he suffered a series of strokes and was taken to a hospital in Oceanside, California. Arnold died there on March 21, 1961, just shy of his 77th birthday.
