= Nathaniel Treat House =

Historic house in Maine, United States

- U.S. National Register of Historic Places
- U.S. Historic district – Contributing property
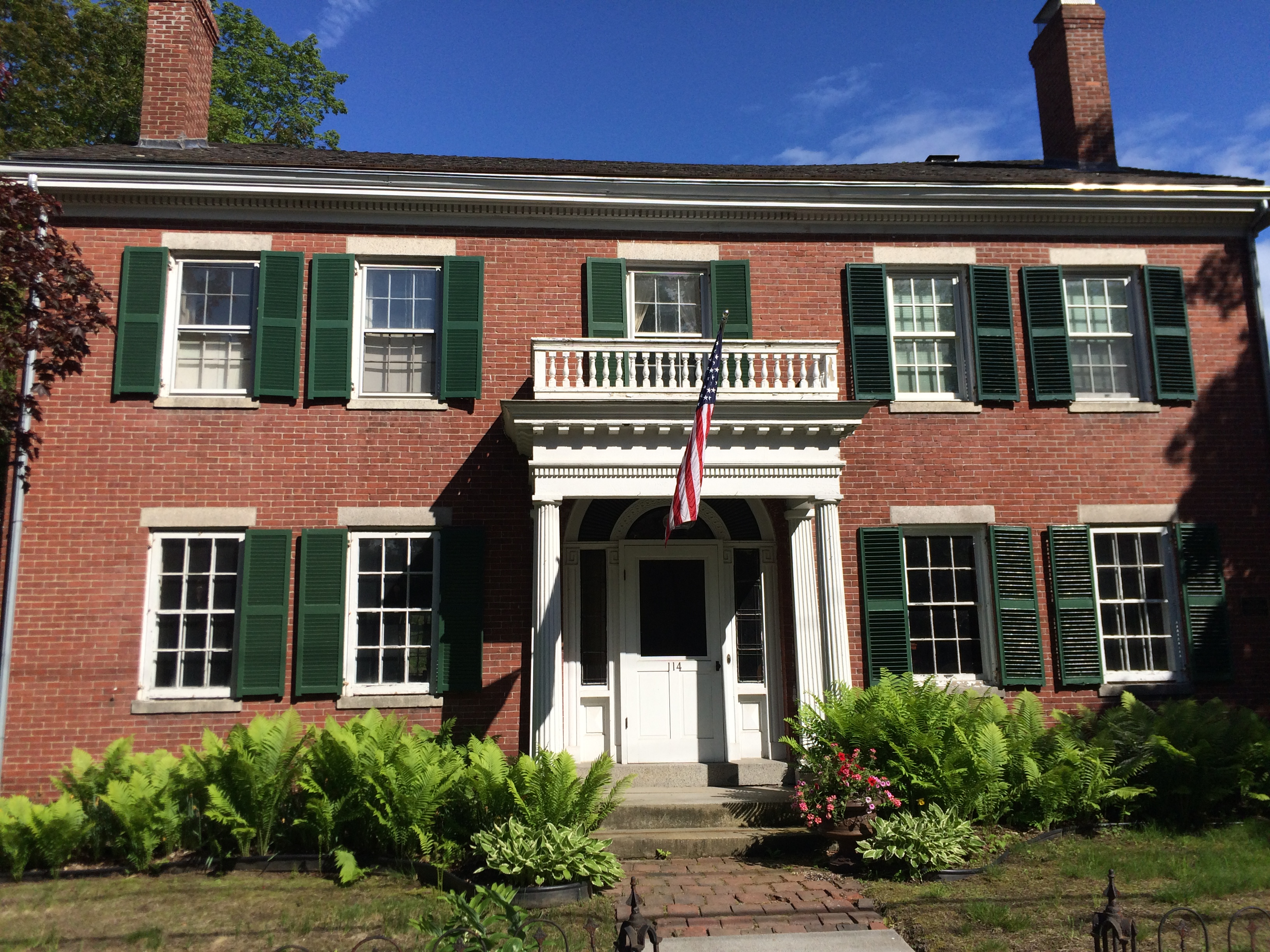
- The Nathaniel Treat House in June 2017

- Location within Maine Location within the United States
- Location: 114 Main St., Orono, Maine
- Coordinates: 44°52′48″N 68°39′48″W
- Area: 1 acre (0.40 ha)
- Built: 1830
- Architectural style: Greek Revival, Federal
- Part of: Orono Main Street Historic District (ID77000082)
- NRHP reference No.: 73000143

Significant dates
- Added to NRHP: September 20, 1973
- Designated CP: December 7, 1977

The Nathaniel Treat House is a historic house at 114 Main Street in Orono, Maine. Probably built in the 1830s, the house is a fine example of transitional Federal-Greek Revival architecture executed in brick. The house was built by Nathaniel Treat, and was in the 20th century home to Charles J. Dunn, chief justice of the Maine Supreme Judicial Court. The house was listed on the National Register of Historic Places in 1973.

== Description and history ==
The Nathaniel Treat House is set on the east side of Main Street (United States Route 2), just north of its junction with Westwood Drive. It is a 2 1/2-story brick structure, with a side-gable roof, four symmetrically placed end chimneys, and a five bay front facade. The main entrance is centered, with a sheltering portico supported by fluted Doric columns and pilasters, whose interior has been glassed in. The doorway is slightly recessed in the wall, with flanking sidelight windows, and a half-round fanlight above. Fenestration is all sash windows, with granite sills and lintels in front. A dentillated cornice encircles the building below the roof line. A single-story open porch extends along the south side of the house.

Nathaniel Treat was one of the leading businessmen of the Orono-Old Town area, in the mid-19th century. He moved to the area in 1829, established a series of sawmills, and acquired much of the land that now makes up the two cities. He was one of Orono's first town selectmen, and served in the state legislature. This house was probably built not long after his arrival, and was his home for about thirty years. In 1924, the house was purchased by Irene Dunn, wife to Charles J. Dunn, then an associate justice of Maine's highest court. Dunn served on the Maine Supreme Judicial Court from 1918 to 1939, the last four years as chief justice.

== See also ==
- National Register of Historic Places listings in Penobscot County, Maine
