= Church End, Cambridgeshire =

Church End may refer to one of several hamlets or isolated sections of villages in Cambridgeshire, England. Churches are not always in the centre of their villages, sometimes because the main settlement moved away from the area near the church. The name Church End is used for settlements clustered around churches outside of the main residential settlements.

Church End may refer to the following hamlets in Cambridgeshire:

- Church End, Parson Drove, Fenland
- Church End, Catworth, Huntingdonshire
- Church End, Woodwalton, Huntingdonshire
- Church End, Over, South Cambridgeshire
- Church End, Swavesey, South Cambridgeshire
