= Church End, Shalford =

Hamlet in Essex, England

Coordinates: 51.926°N 0.5058°E

Church End
- Location within Essex
- OS grid reference: TL724282
- Civil parish: Shalford
- District: Braintree
- Shire county: Essex
- Region: East
- Country: England
- Sovereign state: United Kingdom
- Post town: BRAINTREE
- Postcode district: CM7
- Police: Essex
- Fire: Essex
- Ambulance: East of England
- UK Parliament: Braintree

Church End is a hamlet in the civil parish of Shalford, and the Braintree district of Essex, England. The parish village of Shalford is less than 1 mile north from Church End, and the town of Braintree approximately 3.5 miles (6 km) southeast.
