= Shalford, Essex =

Village in Essex, England

Coordinates: 51.935°N 0.503°E

Shalford
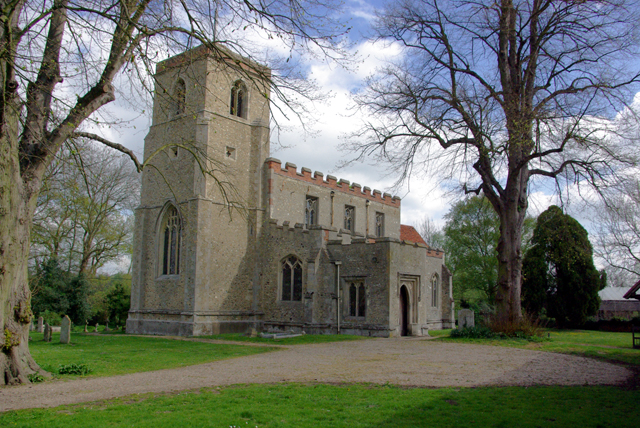
- Shalford church

- Location within Essex
- Population: 785 (Parish, 2021)
- OS grid reference: TL721292
- Civil parish: Shalford
- District: Braintree
- Shire county: Essex
- Region: East
- Country: England
- Sovereign state: United Kingdom
- Post town: BRAINTREE
- Dialling code: 01371
- Police: Essex
- Fire: Essex
- Ambulance: East of England

Shalford is a village and civil parish in the Braintree district of Essex, England. The village is approximately 4 miles (6 km) north from Braintree on the B1057 road. The parish includes the hamlets of Church End, Jasper's Green, and Shalford Green. At the 2021 census the parish had a population of 785.

The village has a primary school, a village hall, and a 14th-century pub (The George). At the southern end of the village is Stoneley Park, constructed in 1997 from an infilled sand pit and where trees were planted by local residents.

The Tour de France cycle race passed through Shalford on the third and final day of its visit to England, on Monday 7 July 2014, en route from Cambridge to London.

== See also ==
- The Hundred Parishes
