= 44th Wisconsin Legislature =

Wisconsin legislative term for 1899-1900

←	43rd	45th	→
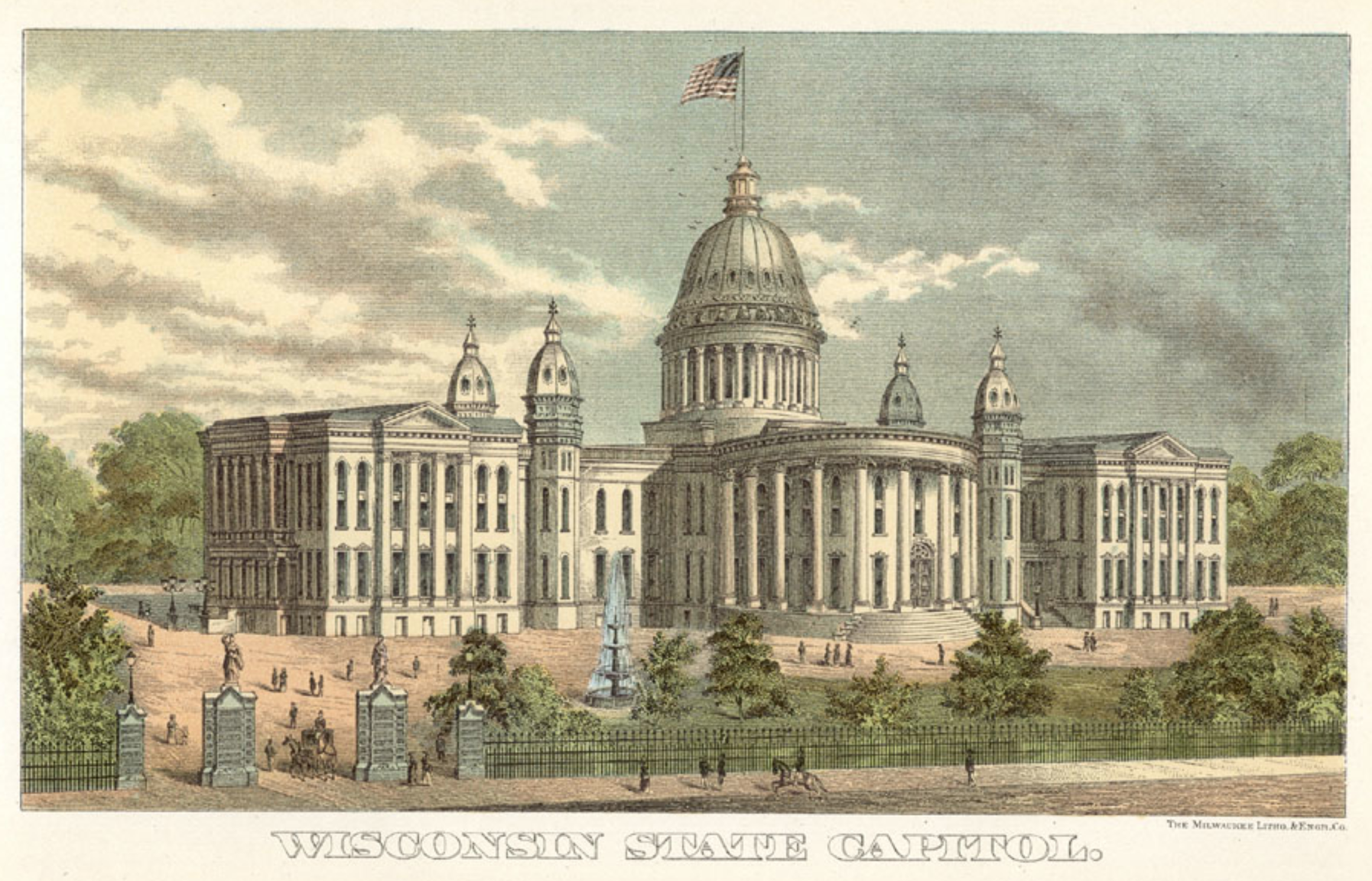
- Wisconsin State Capitol, 1887

Overview
- Legislative body: Wisconsin Legislature
- Meeting place: Wisconsin State Capitol
- Term: January 2, 1899 – January 7, 1901
- Election: November 8, 1898

Senate
- Members: 33
- Senate President: Jesse Stone (R)
- President pro tempore: Lyman W. Thayer (R)
- Party control: Republican

Assembly
- Members: 100
- Assembly Speaker: George H. Ray (R)
- Party control: Republican

Sessions
- 1st: January 11, 1899 – May 4, 1899

The Forty-Fourth Wisconsin Legislature convened from January 11, 1899, to May 4, 1899, in regular session.

Senators representing odd-numbered districts were newly elected for this session and were serving the first two years of a four-year term. Assembly members were elected to a two-year term. Assembly members and odd-numbered senators were elected in the general election of November 8, 1898. Senators representing even-numbered districts were serving the third and fourth year of a four-year term, having been elected in the general election of November 3, 1896.

The governor of Wisconsin during this entire term was Republican Edward Scofield, of Oconto County, serving his second two-year term, having won re-election in the 1898 Wisconsin gubernatorial election.

== Major events ==
- January 31, 1899: Joseph V. Quarles was elected United States Senator by the Wisconsin Legislature in joint session, after 93 ballots in the Republican caucus and 6 ballots in joint session.
- February 4, 1899: United States Army occupation forces at Manila opened fire against armed Philippine militia, who were demanding Philippine independence, inciting the Philippine–American War.
- March 14, 1899: USS Philadelphia took control of the Samoan capital Apia in the midst of the Second Samoan Civil War.
- June 12, 1899: The 1899 New Richmond tornado completely destroyed the city of New Richmond, Wisconsin.
- November 21, 1899: Vice President of the United States Garret Hobart died in office.
- December 2, 1899: The Tripartite Convention in Washington, D.C., ended the Second Samoan Civil War by dividing the territory into a German-administered colony and an American-administered colony.
- March 14, 1900: The United States Gold Standard Act goes into effect, fixing the value of the U.S. dollar to a specific gold weight.
- November 6, 1900: 1900 United States general election:
  - Robert M. "Fighting Bob" La Follette elected Governor of Wisconsin.
  - William McKinley re-elected President of the United States.

== Major legislation ==
- March 30, 1899: An Act to provide for the registration of all persons now engaged in the practice of medicine and surgery in the state of Wisconsin, who were engaged in such practice on or before the first day of July, 1897, 1899 Act 87.
- Joint Resolution proposing to amend section 10, of article 8, of the constitution of Wisconsin, relating to good roads, 1899 Joint Resolution 1. Proposed an amendment to the state constitution to exempt spending on roads from constitutional limitations on deficit spending.
- Joint Resolution proposing an amendment to article 11 of the constitution of Wisconsin, giving the legislature power to pass a general banking law, 1899 Joint Resolution 13.

== Summary ==
=== Senate summary ===
Senate partisan composition Democratic: 2 seats Republican: 31 seats

	Party (Shading indicates majority caucus)		Total	
	Dem.	Rep.	Total	Vacant
End of previous Legislature	4	29	33	0
Start of 1st Session	2	31	33	0
Final voting share	6.06%	93.94%		
Beginning of the next Legislature	2	31	33	0

=== Assembly summary ===
Assembly partisan composition Democratic: 19 seats Republican: 81 seats

	Party (Shading indicates majority caucus)			Total	
	Dem.	Pop.	Rep.	Total	Vacant
End of previous Legislature	9	1	90	100	0
Start of 1st Session	19	0	81	100	0
From Feb. 4, 1899	19	0	80	99	1
From Feb. 10, 1899	18	0	80	98	2
From Feb. 21, 1899	18	0	81	99	1
From Mar. 8, 1899	19	0	81	100	0
Final voting share	19%		81%		
Beginning of the next Legislature	19	0	81	100	0

== Sessions ==
- 1st Regular session: January 11, 1899 – May 4, 1899

== Leaders ==
=== Senate leadership ===
- President of the Senate: Jesse Stone (R)
- President pro tempore: Lyman W. Thayer (R)

=== Assembly leadership ===
- Speaker of the Assembly: George H. Ray (R)

== Members ==
=== Members of the Senate ===
Members of the Senate for the Forty-Fourth Wisconsin Legislature:

Senate partisan representation Democratic: 2 seats Republican: 31 seats

Dist.	Counties	Senator	Residence	Party
01	Door, Kewaunee, & Marinette	De Wayne Stebbins	Algoma	Rep.
02	Brown & Oconto	Andrew C. Mailer	De Pere	Rep.
03	Kenosha & Racine	John F. Reynolds	Randall	Rep.
04	Milwaukee (Northern Part)	J. Herbert Green	Milwaukee	Rep.
05	Milwaukee (City Center)	Frank A. Anson	Milwaukee	Rep.
06	Milwaukee (City Northwest)	William Devos	Milwaukee	Rep.
07	Milwaukee (Southern & Western County)	Barney Eaton	Milwaukee	Rep.
08	Milwaukee (City South)	Julius E. Roehr	Milwaukee	Rep.
09	Adams, Marquette, Waushara, & Wood	Thomas Fearne	Richfield	Rep.
10	Pierce & St. Croix	Dempster Woodworth	Ellsworth	Rep.
11	Burnett, Douglas, & Polk	Edgar G. Mills	West Superior	Rep.
12	Ashland, Barron, Bayfield, Iron, Sawyer, & Washburn	Clarence A. Lamoreux	Ashland	Rep.
13	Dodge	Michael A. Jacobs	Beaver Dam	Dem.
14	Outagamie & Shawano	Alexander B. Whitman	Appleton	Rep.
15	Calumet & Manitowoc	Norman Knudson	Manitowoc	Rep.
16	Grant & Iowa	Charles H. Baxter	Lancaster	Rep.
17	Green, Lafayette, & southern Rock	Harry C. Martin	Darlington	Rep.
18	Fond du Lac & Green Lake	Lyman W. Thayer	Ripon	Rep.
19	Winnebago	Henry I. Weed	Oshkosh	Dem.
20	Ozaukee & Sheboygan	Fred A. Dennett	Port Washington	Rep.
21	Portage & Waupaca	William H. Hatton	New London	Rep.
22	Northern Rock & western Jefferson	John M. Whitehead	Janesville	Rep.
23	Walworth & eastern Jefferson	John H. Harris	Elkhorn	Rep.
24	Buffalo, Eau Claire, & Pepin	John W. Whelan	Mondovi	Rep.
25	Clark & Marathon	Andrew L. Kreutzer	Wausau	Rep.
26	Dane	Chauncey B. Welton	Madison	Rep.
27	Columbia & Sauk	William G. Bissell	Lodi	Rep.
28	Crawford, Richland, & Vernon	Oliver Munson	Viroqua	Rep.
29	Chippewa & Dunn	James H. Stout	Menomonie	Rep.
30	Florence, Forest, Langlade, Lincoln, Oneida, Price, Taylor, & Vilas	Daniel E. Riordan	Eagle River	Rep.
31	Jackson, Juneau, & Monroe	James J. McGillivray	Black River Falls	Rep.
32	La Crosse & Trempealeau	Levi Withee	La Crosse	Rep.
33	Washington & Waukesha	Alfred M. Jones	Waukesha	Rep.

=== Members of the Assembly ===
Members of the Assembly for the Forty-Fourth Wisconsin Legislature:

Assembly partisan composition Democratic: 19 seats Republican: 81 seats

Milwaukee County districts

Senate District	County	Dist.	Representative	Party	Residence
09	Adams & Marquette		Charles H. Kempley	Rep.	Packwaukee
12	Ashland & Iron		Frank Logan	Rep.	Hurley
12	Barron		Kapp Rasmussen	Rep.	Rice Lake
12	Bayfield, Sawyer, & Washburn		Arthur W. McLeod	Rep.	Washburn
02	Brown	1	Thomas J. McGrath	Rep.	Green Bay
02	Brown	2	Michael J. Flaherty	Dem.	Morrison
24	Buffalo & Pepin		Henry Roettiger	Rep.	Fountain City
11	Burnett & Polk		Lester B. Dresser	Rep.	St. Croix Falls
15	Calumet		Jeremiah W. Baldock	Rep.	Chilton
29	Chippewa	1	Lycurgus J. Rusk	Rep.	Chippewa Falls
29	Chippewa	2	John W. Thomas	Rep.	Anson
25	Clark		Lafayette M. Sturdevant	Rep.	Neillsville
27	Columbia	1	Jabez H. Wells	Rep.	Portage
27	Columbia	2	George Wylie	Rep.	Leeds
28	Crawford		Hugh Porter	Rep.	Seneca
26	Dane	1	George E. Bryant	Rep.	Madison
26	Dane	2	Nicholas Anderson	Rep.	Albion
26	Dane	3	Oscar F. Minch	Dem.	Montrose
13	Dodge	1	John Kessler	Dem.	Watertown
13	Dodge	2	Henry S. Gilmore	Dem.	Beaver Dam
01	Door		Henry J. Overbeck	Rep.	Sturgeon Bay
11	Douglas	1	William E. Hoehle	Rep.	Superior
11	Douglas	2	Charles L. Catlin	Rep.	Superior
29	Dunn		Albert R. Hall	Rep.	Knapp
24	Eau Claire	1	Byron Buffington	Rep.	Eau Claire
24	Eau Claire	2	Horace N. Polley	Rep.	Bridge Creek
30	Florence, Forest, & Langlade		John McGreer	Dem.	Antigo
18	Fond du Lac	1	Louie A. Lange	Dem.	Fond du Lac
18	Fond du Lac	2	Henry A. Ripley	Rep.	Oakfield
16	Grant	1	Thomas McDonald Jr.	Rep.	Lancaster
16	Grant	2	John Ryan	Rep.	Beetown
17	Green		A. Clarke Dodge	Rep.	Monroe
18	Green Lake		William J. Middleton	Rep.	Berlin
16	Iowa		Bjorn Holland	Rep.	Hollandale
31	Jackson		George Olson	Rep.	Taylor
23	Jefferson	1	Harman Grube	Dem.	Watertown
22	Jefferson	2	Lewis Benson	Dem.	Oakland
31	Juneau		John M. Barlow	Rep.	New Lisbon
03	Kenosha		S. Dwight Slade	Rep.	Wheatland
01	Kewaunee		John W. Adams	Dem.	Kewaunee
32	La Crosse	1	George H. Ray	Rep.	La Crosse
32	La Crosse	2	Mark Buttles	Rep.	Onalaska
17	Lafayette		Philo A. Orton	Rep.	Darlington
30	Lincoln & Taylor		Michael W. Ryan	Dem.	Medford
15	Manitowoc	1	Joseph Willott Jr.	Rep.	Manitowoc
15	Manitowoc	2	Jonas Gagnon	Dem.	Two Rivers
25	Marathon	1	Gilbert Vandercook	Rep.	Spencer
25	Marathon	2	George Werheim	Rep.	Wausau
01	Marinette		Robert O. Hunt	Rep.	Peshtigo
05	Milwaukee	1	Francis B. Keene	Rep.	Milwaukee
05	Milwaukee	2	Matthew Killilea	Dem.	Milwaukee
07	Milwaukee	3	John Sneddon	Rep.	Milwaukee
05	Milwaukee	4	August Zinn	Rep.	Milwaukee
08	Milwaukee	5	Albert Woyciechowski (died Feb. 10, 1899)	Dem.	Milwaukee
08	Milwaukee	5	Joseph Rechlicz (from Mar. 8, 1899)	Dem.	Milwaukee
04	Milwaukee	6	Francis Eline	Dem.	Milwaukee
07	Milwaukee	7	Frederick Hartung	Rep.	Wauwatosa
08	Milwaukee	8	Reinhold Thiessenhusen	Rep.	Milwaukee
06	Milwaukee	9	George Schoenbaum	Rep.	Milwaukee
06	Milwaukee	10	Edward J. Dengel	Rep.	Milwaukee
08	Milwaukee	11	Julius Feige	Rep.	Milwaukee
06	Milwaukee	12	Ernst Loth	Rep.	Milwaukee
04	Milwaukee	13	Henry Soltwedel	Rep.	Milwaukee
07	Milwaukee	14	August Gawin	Dem.	Milwaukee
04	Milwaukee	15	Abraham L. Grootemaat	Rep.	Milwaukee
31	Monroe		Frederick P. Johnson	Rep.	Sheldon
02	Oconto		Lesley C. Harvey	Rep.	Oconto
30	Oneida, Price, & Vilas		Joseph Farr	Rep.	Phillips
14	Outagamie	1	Theophilus A. Willy	Rep.	Appleton
14	Outagamie	2	Henry L. Daggett	Rep.	Deer Creek
20	Ozaukee		Nicholas E. Becker	Dem.	Fredonia
10	Pierce		C. R. Morse	Rep.	River Falls
21	Portage	1	Patrick H. Cashin	Dem.	Stevens Point
21	Portage	2	Fred J. Frost	Rep.	Almond
03	Racine	1	John C. Wagner	Rep.	Racine
03	Racine	2	George Ela	Rep.	Rochester
28	Richland		William M. Fogo	Rep.	Richland Center
22	Rock	1	William G. Wheeler	Rep.	Janesville
22	Rock	2	Robert More	Rep.	Bradford
17	Rock	3	Lowell H. Parker	Rep.	Beloit
27	Sauk	1	John M. True	Rep.	Baraboo
27	Sauk	2	John E. Morgan	Rep.	Spring Green
14	Shawano		Frank W. Humphrey	Rep.	Shawano
20	Sheboygan	1	Martin O. Galaway	Rep.	Sheboygan
20	Sheboygan	2	John E. Richardson	Rep.	Sheboygan Falls
20	Sheboygan	3	Whitman A. Barber	Rep.	Waldo
10	St. Croix		Orville W. Mosher	Rep.	New Richmond
32	Trempealeau		David L. Holcomb	Rep.	Arcadia
28	Vernon		Andrew H. Dahl	Rep.	Westby
23	Walworth	1	William H. Hurlbut	Rep.	Elkhorn
23	Walworth	2	Darwin Clough	Rep.	Darien
33	Washington		Louis D. Guth	Rep.	Kewaskum
33	Waukesha	1	James Johnston	Rep.	Mukwonago
33	Waukesha	2	Mark W. Rowell	Rep.	Hartland
21	Waupaca	1	Emil H. Steiger	Rep.	Fremont
21	Waupaca	2	Andrew Jensen	Rep.	Ogdensburg
09	Waushara		William Hughes (died Feb. 4, 1899)	Rep.	Aurora
09	Waushara		David Evans Jr. (elected Feb. 21, 1899)	Rep.	Aurora
19	Winnebago	1	F. Badger Ives	Dem.	Oshkosh
19	Winnebago	2	Edwin A. Williams	Rep.	Neenah
19	Winnebago	3	Christian Sarau	Rep.	Oshkosh
09	Wood		Amos E. Germer	Dem.	Dexter

== Committees ==
=== Senate committees ===
- Senate Committee on Agriculture – Whelan, chair
- Senate Committee on Assessment and Collection of Taxes – Whitehead, chair
- Senate Committee on Bills on Third Reading – Eaton, chair
- Senate Committee on Corporations – Devos, chair
- Senate Committee on Education – Stout, chair
- Senate Committee on Enrolled Bills – Woodworth, chair
- Senate Committee on Engrossed Bills – Whitman, chair
- Senate Committee on Federal Relations – Mills, chair
- Senate Committee on Finance, Banks and Insurance – Roehr, chair
- Senate Committee on the Judiciary – Lamoreux, chair
- Senate Committee on Legislative Expenses – Reynolds, chair
- Senate Committee on Manufactures – Anson, chair
- Senate Committee on Military Affairs – Welton, chair
- Senate Committee on Privileges and Elections – Jones, chair
- Senate Committee on Public Health – Mailer, chair
- Senate Committee on Public Lands – Dennett, chair
- Senate Committee on Railroads – Withee, chair
- Senate Committee on Roads and Bridges – Thayer, chair
- Senate Committee on State Affairs – McGillivray, chair
- Senate Committee on Town and County Organizations – Riordans, chair

=== Assembly committees ===
- Assembly Committee on Agriculture – Wylie, chair
- Assembly Committee on Assessment and Collection of Taxes – Hall, chair
- Assembly Committee on Bills on Third Reading – Porter, chair
- Assembly Committee on Cities – F. B. Keene, chair
- Assembly Committee on Corporations – Overbeck, chair
- Assembly Committee on Dairy and Food – S. D. Slade, chair
- Assembly Committee on Education – Dresser, chair
- Assembly Committee on Enrolled Bills – Buttles, chair
- Assembly Committee on Engrossed Bills – Fogo, chair
- Assembly Committee on Federal Relations – Sarau, chair
- Assembly Committee on Finance, Banks and Insurance – Buffington, chair
- Assembly Committee on the Judiciary – Wheeler, chair
- Assembly Committee on Legislative Expenditures – J. R. Farr, chair
- Assembly Committee on Lumber and Mining – H. A. Ripley, chair
- Assembly Committee on Manufactures – Zinn, chair
- Assembly Committee on Military Affairs – Rusk, chair
- Assembly Committee on Privileges and Elections – McDonald, chair
- Assembly Committee on Public Health and Sanitation – Johnson, chair
- Assembly Committee on Public Improvements – J. H. Wells, chair
- Assembly Committee on Public Lands – Polley, chair
- Assembly Committee on Railroads – J. W. Thomas, chair
- Assembly Committee on Roads and Bridges – A. Jensen, chair
- Assembly Committee on State Affairs – T. J. McGrath, chair
- Assembly Committee on Town and County Organizations – J. E. Morgan, chair
- Assembly Committee on Ways and Means – G. Schoenbaum, chair

=== Joint committees ===
- Joint Committee on Charitable and Penal Institutions – Stebbins (Sen.) & William H. Hurlbut (Asm.), co-chairs
- Joint Committee on Claims – Baxter (Sen.) & John M. True (Asm.), co-chairs
- Joint Committee on Fish and Game – Green (Sen.) & L. C. Harvey (Asm.), co-chairs
- Joint Committee on Printing – Munson (Sen.) & William M. Fogo (Asm.), co-chairs

== Employees ==
=== Senate employees ===
- Chief Clerk: Walter Houser
  - Journal Clerk: Henry C. Schultz
  - Bookkeeper: Andrew Rood
  - Engrossing Clerk: F. E. Andrews
    - Assistant Engrossing Clerk: E. P. Bennett
  - Enrolling Clerk: H. E. Polly
  - Enrollment Clerk: Ed. Schaffland
  - Proofreader: F. W. Bruce
  - Index Clerk: J. C. McFarland
    - Assistant Index Clerk: R. H. Clark
  - Clerk for the Judiciary Committee: M. Schmidt
  - Clerk for the Committee on Bills on 3rd Reading: Joseph Elliott
  - Clerk for the Committee on Engrossed Bills: Irene Whitman
  - Clerk for the Committee on Incorporations: M. P. Schmitt
  - Clerk for the Committee on Claims: W. H. Burk
  - Clerk for the Committee on State Affairs: I. S. Dunn
  - Stenographer: G. E. Dixon
  - Clerks:
    - Will F. Cody
    - A. R. Mead
  - Document Clerks:
    - F. W. Meinke
    - Ben. S. Thayer
  - Comparing Clerks:
    - Edwin Blair
    - M. S. Cyboruski
    - D. Graham
    - W. J. Hocking
- Sergeant-at-Arms: Charles A. Pettibone
  - Assistant Sergeant-at-Arms: A. F. Wright
- Postmaster: Christoph Paulus
  - Assistant Postmaster: H. M. Knowlton
- Committee Room Attendants:
  - F. F. Massart
  - J. D. Corlett
- Doorkeepers:
  - R. E. Tilden
  - H. M. Allen
- Night Watch: J. G. Taylor
- Janitor: Ross Preston
- Custodian: Louis Ehlieter
  - Custodian of the Engrossing Room: H. Roener
  - Custodian of the Enrolling Room: Joseph S. Green
- Messengers:
  - Dana L. Woodworth
  - Harry C. May
  - R. C. Stolhand
  - Loyd Jones
  - Edgar Mills
  - M. Johnson

=== Assembly employees ===
- Chief Clerk: Winslow A. Nowell
  - Assistant Chief Clerk: Frederic W. Coon
  - Journal Clerks:
    - Carleton H. Wells
    - Fred Nelson
  - Bookkeepers:
    - Jos. B. Foster
    - Claire Currier
  - Stenographers:
    - Clarence C. Fish
    - Almeda Sturdevant
  - Document Clerks:
    - John H. Johnson
    - M. L. Burdick
  - Engrossing Clerk: Lawrence H. Berges
    - Assistant Engrossing Clerk: Albert C. Brownell
  - Enrolling Clerk: Charles W. Blay
    - Assistant Enrolling Clerk: Albert J. Wolf
  - Index Clerk: Fred H. Hartwell
    - Assistant Index Clerk: C. E. Shaffer
  - Stationary Clerk: Henry H. McGraw
  - Proof Reader: John H. Frazier
  - Comparing Clerks:
    - Mary E. Chadwick
    - Anna Haseltine
    - Nellie L. Proctor
    - Alluna Christie
  - Clerk for the Judiciary Committee: Henry S. Sloan
  - Clerk for the Committee on Bills on 3rd Reading: J. D. Stuart
  - Clerk for the Committee on Enrolled Bills: J. T. Atwater
  - Clerk for the Committee on Engrossed Bills: Emma C. Fogo
  - Clerk for the Committee on State Affairs: William H. Field
- Sergeant-at-Arms: James H. Agen
  - Assistant Sergeant-at-Arms: B. C. Walters
- Postmaster: H. F. Dinsmore
  - Assistant Postmaster: C. L. Turney
- Doorkeepers:
  - Joseph Goss
  - H. H. Reynolds
  - N. F. Pierce
  - D. Ray
- Gallery Attendants:
  - H. T. Mower
  - John Grootemaat
- Day Attendant: H. J. Conlin
- Porter: Herman Miller
- Flagman: D. Thiele
- Night Watch: A. C. Hoover
- Custodian of the Enrolling Room: Andrew Nelson
- Custodian of the Engrossing Room: William Eggert
- Committee Room Custodians:
  - H. F. Pagel
  - Ralph C. Pickering
- Cloak Room Attendants:
  - Martin Thompson
  - F. G. Dahlberg
- Pages:
  - Goodworth Lillisand
  - Walter Nebel
  - Albert Haven
  - Willie Doty
  - Arthur Funking
  - Solli Cooper
  - Geo Blanchard
  - Earl V. Agen
  - Hubert Ford
  - Stanley Morse
  - John Colling
  - Thomas Lloyd
