= 43rd Wisconsin Legislature =

Wisconsin legislative term for 1897-1898

| ← | 42nd | 44th | → |
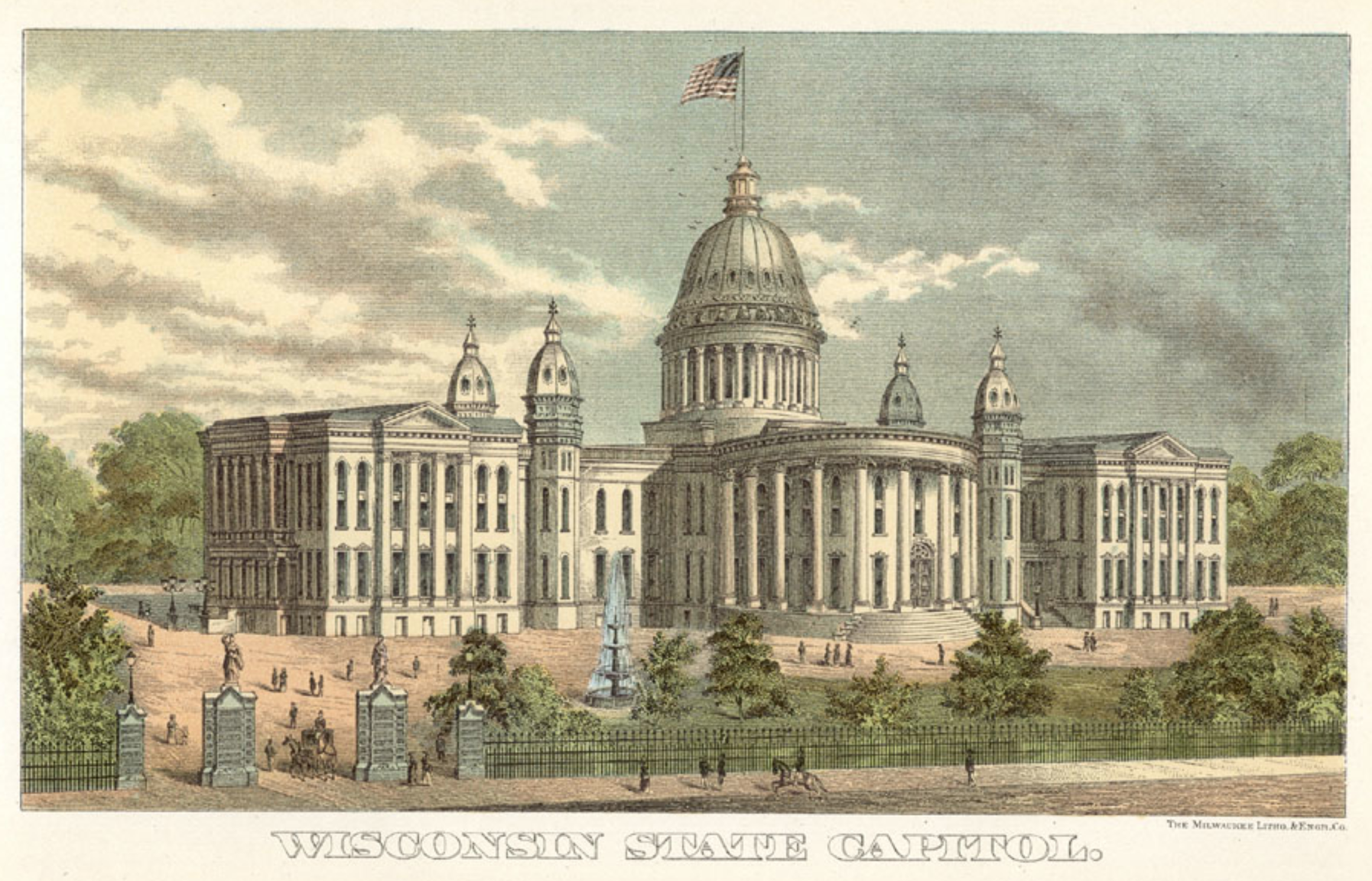
- Wisconsin State Capitol, 1887

Overview
- Legislative body: Wisconsin Legislature
- Meeting place: Wisconsin State Capitol
- Term: January 4, 1897 – January 2, 1899
- Election: November 3, 1896

Senate
- Members: 33
- Senate President: Emil Baensch (R)
- President pro tempore: Lyman W. Thayer (R)
- Party control: Republican

Assembly
- Members: 100
- Assembly Speaker: George A. Buckstaff (R)
- Party control: Republican

Sessions
- 1st: January 13, 1897 – April 21, 1897

Special sessions
- Aug. Special: August 17, 1897 – August 20, 1897

The Forty-Third Wisconsin Legislature convened from January 13, 1897, to April 21, 1897, in regular session. They also convened in a special session from August 17 through August 20, 1897.

This was the first legislative session after the redistricting of the Senate and Assembly according to an act of the previous session.

Senators representing even-numbered districts were newly elected for this session and were serving the first two years of a four-year term. Assembly members were elected to a two-year term. Assembly members and even-numbered senators were elected in the general election of November 3, 1896. Senators representing odd-numbered districts were serving the third and fourth year of a four-year term, having been elected in the general election of November 6, 1894.

The governor of Wisconsin during this entire term was Republican Edward Scofield, of Oconto County, serving a two-year term, having won election in the 1896 Wisconsin gubernatorial election.

== Major events ==
- January 4, 1897: Inauguration of Edward Scofield as 19th Governor of Wisconsin.
- January 31, 1897: John Coit Spooner was elected United States Senator by the Wisconsin Legislature in joint session.
- March 4, 1897: Inauguration of William McKinley as 25th President of the United States.
- May 3, 1897: Wisconsin state legislator William A. Jones was confirmed by the U.S. Senate as commissioner of Indian Affairs.
- November 25, 1897: The Spanish Empire granted autonomy to Puerto Rico.
- January 1, 1898: New York City annexed territory from surrounding counties, becoming the second largest city in the world at that time.
- January 11, 1898: Wisconsin Supreme Court justice Alfred Newman died in office.
- January 25, 1898: Wisconsin Governor Edward Scofield appointed Charles V. Bardeen to the Wisconsin Supreme Court to replace the deceased justice Alfred Newman.
- February 15, 1898: The USS Maine exploded in Havana harbor, Cuba, for reasons that are still not known. 266 died in the disaster, which would become the inciting event of the Spanish–American War.
- March 1, 1898: Vladimir Lenin created the Russian Social Democratic Labour Party.
- April 25, 1898: The United States declared war against the Spanish Empire over the destruction of the Maine.
- July 7, 1898: The United States annexed the Hawaiian Islands.
- November 8, 1898: general election
  - Edward Scofield was re-elected as Governor of Wisconsin.
  - Wisconsin voters rejected the new state banking law in a mandatory referendum.
- December 10, 1898: Representatives of the United States and Spain signed the Treaty of Paris, ending the Spanish–American War. Spain ceded the territories of Cuba, Puerto Rico, Guam, and the Philippines to U.S. control.

== Major legislation ==
- April 22, 1897: An Act to revise the laws authorizing the business of banking, 1897 Act 303. Attempted to create a state department of banking. The Wisconsin Constitution required that any law which enabled the business of banking in Wisconsin had to be approved by a public referendum. This legislation went to the voters in the 1898 general election and was defeated.
- Joint Resolution that the foregoing proposed amendment to the constitution of the state of Wisconsin be and the same is agreed to by this legislature, 1897 Joint Resolution 9. This was the second legislative passage of a proposed amendment to grant authority to the legislature to determine the appropriate number of circuit court seats for single-county circuits. The amendment would be ratified by the voters in the Spring 1897 election.
- Joint Resolution to amend article No. 11 of the constitution of the state of Wisconsin, 1897 Joint Resolution 17. Proposed an amendment which would enable the Legislature to set limits on taxation enacted by counties and towns in the state. This amendment would not proceed beyond this step.
- Joint Resolution proposing an amendment to section 1, of article 10, of the constitution of the state of Wisconsin relating to education, 1897 Joint Resolution 22. Proposed a constitutional amendment to move the election of Superintendent of Public Instruction from the Fall of even numbered years to the Spring of odd numbered years. This amendment also would not proceed, but the proposed change would be enacted by a later amendment.

== Summary ==
=== Senate summary ===
Senate partisan composition Democratic: 4 seats Republican: 29 seats

| | Party (Shading indicates majority caucus) | | Total | |
| | Dem. | Rep. | Total | Vacant |
|---|---|---|---|---|
| End of previous Legislature | 13 | 20 | 33 | 0 |
| Start of 1st Session | 4 | 29 | 33 | 0 |
| Final voting share | 12.12% | 87.88% | | |
| Beginning of the next Legislature | 2 | 31 | 33 | 0 |

=== Assembly summary ===
Assembly partisan composition Democratic: 9 seats Populist: 1 seat Republican: 90 seats

| | Party (Shading indicates majority caucus) | | | Total | |
| | Dem. | Pop. | Rep. | Total | Vacant |
|---|---|---|---|---|---|
| End of previous Legislature | 19 | 0 | 81 | 100 | 0 |
| Start of 1st Session | 9 | 1 | 90 | 100 | 0 |
| From Apr. 21, 1897 (Note: Republican William A. Jones (Iowa County) resigned after he was appointed U.S. Commissioner of Indian Affairs.) | 9 | 1 | 89 | 99 | 1 |
| Final voting share | 10% | | 90% | | |
| Beginning of the next Legislature | 19 | 0 | 81 | 100 | 0 |

== Sessions ==
- 1st Regular session: January 13, 1897 – April 21, 1897
- August 1897 Special session: August 17, 1897 – August 20, 1897

== Leaders ==
=== Senate leadership ===
- President of the Senate: Emil Baensch (R)
- President pro tempore: Lyman W. Thayer (R)

=== Assembly leadership ===
- Speaker of the Assembly: George A. Buckstaff (R)

== Members ==
=== Members of the Senate ===
Members of the Senate for the Forty-Third Wisconsin Legislature:

Senate partisan representation Democratic: 4 seats Republican: 29 seats

| Dist. | Counties | Senator | Residence | Party |
|---|---|---|---|---|
| 01 | Door, Kewaunee, & Marinette | De Wayne Stebbins | Ahnapee | Rep. |
| 02 | Brown & Oconto | Andrew C. Mailer | De Pere | Rep. |
| 03 | Kenosha & Racine | Ernst Timme | Kenosha | Rep. |
| 04 | Milwaukee (Northern Part) | J. Herbert Green | Milwaukee | Rep. |
| 05 | Milwaukee (City Center) | William H. Austin | Milwaukee | Rep. |
| 06 | Milwaukee (City Northwest) | William Devos | Milwaukee | Rep. |
| 07 | Milwaukee (Southern & Western County) | Charles T. Fisher | Wauwatosa | Rep. |
| 08 | Milwaukee (City South) | Julius E. Roehr | Milwaukee | Rep. |
| 09 | Adams, Marquette, Waushara, & Wood | Clarence V. Peirce | Germania | Rep. |
| 10 | Pierce & St. Croix | Dempster Woodworth | Ellsworth | Rep. |
| 11 | Burnett, Douglas, & Polk | Thomas B. Mills | West Superior | Rep. |
| 12 | Ashland, Barron, Bayfield, Iron, Sawyer, & Washburn | Clarence A. Lamoreux | Ashland | Rep. |
| 13 | Dodge | Michael E. Burke | Beaver Dam | Dem. |
| 14 | Outagamie & Shawano | Alexander B. Whitman | Appleton | Rep. |
| 15 | Calumet & Manitowoc | John E. McMullen | Chilton | Dem. |
| 16 | Grant & Iowa | Charles H. Baxter | Lancaster | Rep. |
| 17 | Green, Lafayette, & southern Rock | Henry Putnam | Brodhead | Rep. |
| 18 | Fond du Lac & Green Lake | Lyman W. Thayer | Ripon | Rep. |
| 19 | Winnebago | Charles W. Davis | Oshkosh | Rep. |
| 20 | Ozaukee & Sheboygan | Fred A. Dennett | Port Washington | Rep. |
| 21 | Portage & Waupaca | John Phillips | Stevens Point | Rep. |
| 22 | Northern Rock & western Jefferson | John M. Whitehead | Janesville | Rep. |
| 23 | Walworth & eastern Jefferson | Albert Solliday | Watertown | Dem. |
| 24 | Buffalo, Eau Claire, & Pepin | John W. Whelan | Mondovi | Rep. |
| 25 | Clark & Marathon | Clarion A. Youmans | Neillsville | Rep. |
| 26 | Dane | Chauncey B. Welton | Madison | Rep. |
| 27 | Columbia & Sauk | William F. Conger | Prairie du Sac | Rep. |
| 28 | Crawford, Richland, & Vernon | Oliver Munson | Viroqua | Rep. |
| 29 | Chippewa & Dunn | James H. Stout | Menomonie | Rep. |
| 30 | Florence, Forest, Langlade, Lincoln, Oneida, Price, Taylor, & Vilas | Daniel E. Riordan | Eagle River | Rep. |
| 31 | Jackson, Juneau, & Monroe | James J. McGillivray | Black River Falls | Rep. |
| 32 | La Crosse & Trempealeau | Levi Withee | La Crosse | Rep. |
| 33 | Washington & Waukesha | Stephen F. Mayer | West Bend | Dem. |

=== Members of the Assembly ===
Members of the Assembly for the Forty-Third Wisconsin Legislature:

Assembly partisan composition Democratic: 9 seats Populist: 1 seat Republican: 90 seats

Milwaukee County districts

| Senate District | County | Dist. | Representative | Party | Residence |
|---|---|---|---|---|---|
| 09 | Adams & Marquette | | Solon Pierce | Rep. | Friendship |
| 12 | Ashland & Iron | | Mathew J. Connors | Rep. | Hurley |
| 12 | Barron | | Jonathan J. Smith | Rep. | Barron |
| 12 | Bayfield, Sawyer, & Washburn | | King G. Staples | Rep. | Iron River |
| 02 | Brown | 1 | Thomas J. McGrath | Rep. | Green Bay |
| 02 | Brown | 2 | John M. Hogan | Rep. | Green Bay |
| 24 | Buffalo & Pepin | | Samuel F. Plummer | Rep. | Waterville |
| 11 | Burnett & Polk | | Lester B. Dresser | Rep. | St. Croix Falls |
| 15 | Calumet | | Joseph Wolfinger | Dem. | Woodville |
| 29 | Chippewa | 1 | Charles A. Stanley | Rep. | Chippewa Falls |
| 29 | Chippewa | 2 | John W. Thomas | Rep. | Anson |
| 25 | Clark | | Joseph C. Marsh | Rep. | Loyal |
| 27 | Columbia | 1 | Lemuel P. Hindes | Rep. | Lodi |
| 27 | Columbia | 2 | George Wylie | Rep. | Leeds |
| 28 | Crawford | | James O. Davidson | Rep. | Soldiers Grove |
| 26 | Dane | 1 | Daniel Bechtel | Dem. | Madison |
| 26 | Dane | 2 | Christopher Legreid | Rep. | Cambridge |
| 26 | Dane | 3 | Oscar F. Minch | Dem. | Montrose |
| 13 | Dodge | 1 | Jesse Clason | Gold Dem. | Neosho |
| 13 | Dodge | 2 | Samuel R. Webster | Rep. | Elba |
| 01 | Door | | Henry J. Overbeck | Rep. | Sturgeon Bay |
| 11 | Douglas | 1 | James H. Agen | Rep. | Superior |
| 11 | Douglas | 2 | Jarvis White | Rep. | South Superior |
| 29 | Dunn | | Albert R. Hall | Rep. | Knapp |
| 24 | Eau Claire | 1 | Byron Buffington | Rep. | Eau Claire |
| 24 | Eau Claire | 2 | Horace N. Polley | Rep. | Bridge Creek |
| 30 | Florence, Forest, & Langlade | | George W. Latta | Rep. | Antigo |
| 18 | Fond du Lac | 1 | Louie A. Lange | Dem. | Fond du Lac |
| 18 | Fond du Lac | 2 | Wynn Edwards | Rep. | Rosendale |
| 16 | Grant | 1 | Thomas McDonald Jr. | Rep. | Lancaster |
| 16 | Grant | 2 | Adelbert L. Utt | Rep. | Platteville |
| 17 | Green | | Nathaniel B. Treat | Rep. | Monroe |
| 18 | Green Lake | | Hans H. Olson | Rep. | Berlin |
| 16 | Iowa | | William A. Jones | Rep. | Mineral Point |
| 31 | Jackson | | Addison W. Merrill | Rep. | Alma |
| 23 | Jefferson | 1 | Jesse Stone | Rep. | Watertown |
| 22 | Jefferson | 2 | Gilbert Rutherford | Rep. | Lake Mills |
| 31 | Juneau | | Frank E. Hurd | Rep. | New Lisbon |
| 03 | Kenosha | | John F. Reynolds | Rep. | Randall |
| 01 | Kewaunee | | Maynard T. Parker | Rep. | Ahnapee |
| 32 | La Crosse | 1 | George H. Ray | Rep. | La Crosse |
| 32 | La Crosse | 2 | Mark Buttles | Rep. | Onalaska |
| 17 | Lafayette | | George Sheffer | Rep. | New Diggings |
| 30 | Lincoln & Taylor | | William H. Flett | Rep. | Merrill |
| 15 | Manitowoc | 1 | Charles W. Sweeting | Rep. | Cato |
| 15 | Manitowoc | 2 | Fred C. Maertz | Dem. | Reedsville |
| 25 | Marathon | 1 | Henry M. Thompson | Rep. | Mosinee |
| 25 | Marathon | 2 | Marcus H. Barnum | Rep. | Wausau |
| 01 | Marinette | | George W. Taylor | Rep. | Marinette |
| 05 | Milwaukee | 1 | Charles H. Welch | Rep. | Milwaukee |
| 05 | Milwaukee | 2 | Charles Polacheck | Rep. | Milwaukee |
| 07 | Milwaukee | 3 | Barney A. Eaton | Rep. | Milwaukee |
| 05 | Milwaukee | 4 | Frank A. Anson | Rep. | Milwaukee |
| 08 | Milwaukee | 5 | Charles N. Frink | Pop. | Milwaukee |
| 04 | Milwaukee | 6 | Charles Niss | Rep. | Milwaukee |
| 07 | Milwaukee | 7 | Emerson D. Hoyt | Rep. | Wauwatosa |
| 08 | Milwaukee | 8 | John Fremont Burnham | Rep. | Milwaukee |
| 06 | Milwaukee | 9 | Reinhard Klabunde | Rep. | Milwaukee |
| 06 | Milwaukee | 10 | Albert Woller | Rep. | Milwaukee |
| 08 | Milwaukee | 11 | Julius Feige | Rep. | Milwaukee |
| 06 | Milwaukee | 12 | Henry Otto Reinnoldt | Rep. | Milwaukee |
| 04 | Milwaukee | 13 | John H. Yorkey | Rep. | Milwaukee |
| 07 | Milwaukee | 14 | August Gawin | Dem. | Milwaukee |
| 04 | Milwaukee | 15 | Charles A. W. Krauss | Rep. | Milwaukee |
| 31 | Monroe | | David F. Jones | Rep. | Sparta |
| 02 | Oconto | | Lesley C. Harvey | Rep. | Oconto |
| 30 | Oneida, Price, & Vilas | | Gid H. Clark | Rep. | Rhinelander |
| 14 | Outagamie | 1 | Bernard C. Wolter | Rep. | Appleton |
| 14 | Outagamie | 2 | Charles Clack | Rep. | Freedom |
| 20 | Ozaukee | | Herman Schellenberg | Dem. | Cedarburg |
| 10 | Pierce | | George E. Pratt | Rep. | River Falls |
| 21 | Portage | 1 | Patrick H. Cashin | Dem. | Stevens Point |
| 21 | Portage | 2 | Peter N. Peterson | Rep. | Amherst |
| 03 | Racine | 1 | William T. Lewis | Rep. | Racine |
| 03 | Racine | 2 | Thomas H. Mosher | Rep. | Raymond |
| 28 | Richland | | William M. Fogo | Rep. | Richland Center |
| 22 | Rock | 1 | William G. Wheeler | Rep. | Janesville |
| 22 | Rock | 2 | Abner S. Flagg | Rep. | Edgerton |
| 17 | Rock | 3 | Charles W. Merriman | Rep. | Beloit |
| 27 | Sauk | 1 | John M. True | Rep. | Baraboo |
| 27 | Sauk | 2 | John E. Morgan | Rep. | Spring Green |
| 14 | Shawano | | Otto A. Risum | Rep. | Pulcifer |
| 20 | Sheboygan | 1 | Christian Ackerman | Rep. | Sheboygan |
| 20 | Sheboygan | 2 | William F. Sieker | Rep. | Herman |
| 20 | Sheboygan | 3 | George W. Wolff | Rep. | Rhine |
| 10 | St. Croix | | Hans Borchsenius | Rep. | Baldwin |
| 32 | Trempealeau | | Joseph B. Beach | Rep. | Whitehall |
| 28 | Vernon | | Emilus Goodell | Rep. | Viroqua |
| 23 | Walworth | 1 | William H. Hurlbut | Rep. | Elkhorn |
| 23 | Walworth | 2 | Leonard C. Church | Rep. | Walworth |
| 33 | Washington | | William Froehlich | Rep. | Jackson |
| 33 | Waukesha | 1 | Delbert K. Smith | Rep. | Big Bend |
| 33 | Waukesha | 2 | Omar L. Rosenkrans | Rep. | Oconomowoc |
| 21 | Waupaca | 1 | Ole C. Sether | Rep. | |
| 21 | Waupaca | 2 | Andrew Jensen | Rep. | Ogdensburg |
| 09 | Waushara | | William Hughes | Rep. | Aurora |
| 19 | Winnebago | 1 | George A. Buckstaff | Rep. | Oshkosh |
| 19 | Winnebago | 2 | Silas Bullard | Rep. | Menasha |
| 19 | Winnebago | 3 | Frank T. Tucker | Rep. | Omro |
| 09 | Wood | | Herman C. Wipperman | Rep. | Grand Rapids |

== Committees ==
=== Senate committees ===
- Senate Committee on Agriculture – McGillivray, chair
- Senate Committee on Assessment and Collection of Taxes – Woodworth, chair
- Senate Committee on Banks and Insurance – Davis, chair
- Senate Committee on Bills on Third Reading – Whelan, chair
- Senate Committee on Corporations – Mills, chair
- Senate Committee on Education – Stout, chair
- Senate Committee on Enrolled Bills – Phillips, chair
- Senate Committee on Engrossed Bills – Conger, chair
- Senate Committee on Federal Relations – Whitman, chair
- Senate Committee on the Judiciary – Austin, chair
- Senate Committee on Legislative Expenses – Conger, chair
- Senate Committee on Manufactures – Dennett, chair
- Senate Committee on Military Affairs – Welton, chair
- Senate Committee on Privileges and Elections – Roehr, chair
- Senate Committee on Public Health – Mailer, chair
- Senate Committee on Public Lands – Fisher, chair
- Senate Committee on Railroads – Withee, chair
- Senate Committee on Roads and Bridges – Peirce, chair
- Senate Committee on State Affairs – Putnam, chair
- Senate Committee on Town and County Organizations – Youmans, chair

=== Assembly committees ===
- Assembly Committee on Agriculture – Barney A. Eaton, chair
- Assembly Committee on Assessment and Collection of Taxes – N. B. Treat, chair
- Assembly Committee on Bills on their Third Reading – Bernard C. Wolter, chair
- Assembly Committee on Cities – Frank Anson, chair
- Assembly Committee on Corporations – Charles A. Stanley, chair
- Assembly Committee on Dairy and Food – William Froehlich, chair
- Assembly Committee on Education – Frank T. Tucker, chair
- Assembly Committee on Engrossed Bills – George W. Latta, chair
- Assembly Committee on Enrolled Bills – Mark H. Barnum, chair
- Assembly Committee on Finance, Banks, and Insurance – William A. Jones, chair
- Assembly Committee on Federal Relations – Omar L. Rosenkrans, chair
- Assembly Committee on the Judiciary – Silas Bullard, chair
- Assembly Committee on Legislative Expenditures – A. L. Utt, chair
- Assembly Committee on Lumber and Mining – A. R. Hall, chair
- Assembly Committee on Manufactures – Joseph C. Marsh, chair
- Assembly Committee on Military Affairs – George W. Taylor, chair
- Assembly Committee on Public Lands – Andrew Jensen, chair
- Assembly Committee on Public Health and Sanitation – Jesse A. Clason, chair
- Assembly Committee on Public Improvements – William F. Sieker, chair
- Assembly Committee on Privileges and Elections – Herman C. Wipperman, chair
- Assembly Committee on Railroads – Emerson D. Hoyt, chair
- Assembly Committee on Roads and Bridges – James O. Davidson, chair
- Assembly Committee on State Affairs – Jesse Stone, chair
- Assembly Committee on Town and County Organization – Jonathan J. Smith, chair
- Assembly Committee on Ways and Means – William G. Wheeler, chair

=== Joint committees ===
- Joint Committee on Charitable and Penal Institutions – Stebbins (Sen.) & William T. Lewis (Asm.), co-chairs
- Joint Committee on Claims – Baxter (Sen.) & George H. Ray (Asm.), co-chairs
- Joint Committee on Fish and Game – Timme (Sen.) & Lester B. Dresser (Asm.), co-chairs
- Joint Committee on Printing – Munson (Sen.) & William M. Fogo (Asm.), co-chairs

== Changes from the 42nd Legislature ==
New districts for the 43rd Legislature were defined in 1896 Wisconsin Special Session Act 1, passed into law in the 42nd Wisconsin Legislature.

=== Senate redistricting ===
==== Summary of changes ====
- 7 districts were left unchanged (1, 2, 3, 13, 15, 19, 32).
- Dane County became a single district again (26) after previously having been divided between two districts.
- Milwaukee County went from having 4 and a half districts to 5 districts (4, 5, 6, 7, 8).
- Fond du Lac County lost its single-district status and was combined with Green Lake County (18).
- Two counties were split in multi-county districts (Rock & Jefferson), down from seven under the previous map.
- Fond du Lac County became its own district (18) after previously having been split between two districts.
- Only three single-county districts remain (18, 19, 20).
- Seven counties are split between multi-county senate districts.

==== Senate districts ====
| Dist. | 42nd Legislature | 43rd Legislature |
|---|---|---|
| 1 | Door, Kewaunee, Marinette counties | Door, Kewaunee, Marinette counties |
| 2 | Brown, Oconto counties | Brown, Oconto counties |
| 3 | Kenosha, Racine counties | Kenosha, Racine counties |
| 4 | Milwaukee County (city northeast) | Milwaukee County (northern quarter) |
| 5 | Milwaukee County (city south) | Milwaukee County (city center) |
| 6 | Milwaukee County (city center) | Milwaukee County (city northwest) |
| 7 | Northern Milwaukee and eastern Waukesha | Milwaukee County (southern & west) |
| 8 | Milwaukee County (county south) | Milwaukee County (city south) |
| 9 | Adams, Juneau, Marquette, Green Lake counties | Adams, Marquette, Waushara, Wood counties |
| 10 | Pierce, Polk, St. Croix counties | Pierce, St. Croix counties |
| 11 | Ashland, Bayfield, Burnett, Douglas, Sawyer, Washburn counties | Burnett, Douglas, Polk counties |
| 12 | Marathon, Wood counties | Ashland, Barron, Bayfield, Iron, Sawyer, Washburn counties |
| 13 | Dodge County | Dodge County |
| 14 | Florence, Forest, Langlade, Lincoln, Shawano counties | Outagamie, Shawano counties |
| 15 | Calumet, Manitowoc counties | Calumet, Manitowoc counties |
| 16 | Crawford, Richland, northern Grant counties | Grant, Iowa counties |
| 17 | Green, southeast Dane, western Rock counties | Green, Lafayette, southern Rock counties |
| 18 | Fond du Lac County | Fond du Lac & Green Lake |
| 19 | Winnebago County | Winnebago County |
| 20 | Sheboygan County | Ozaukee, Sheboygan county |
| 21 | Portage, Waushara, western Waupaca counties | Portage, Waupaca counties |
| 22 | Outagamie, eastern Waupaca counties | Northern Rock, western Jefferson counties |
| 23 | Jefferson, western Waukesha counties | Walworth, eastern Jefferson counties |
| 24 | Walworth, eastern Rock counties | Buffalo, Eau Claire, Pepin counties |
| 25 | Clark, Eau Claire counties | Clark, Marathon counties |
| 26 | Most of Dane County | Dane County |
| 27 | Sauk, western Columbia counties | Columbia, Sauk counties |
| 28 | Iowa, Lafayette, southern Grant counties | Crawford, Richland, Vernon counties |
| 29 | Buffalo, Barron, Dunn, Pepin counties | Chippewa, Dunn counties |
| 30 | Chippewa, Oneida, Price, Taylor counties | Florence, Forest, Langlade, Lincoln, Oneida, Price, Taylor, Vilas counties |
| 31 | Jackson, Monroe, Vernon counties | Jackson, Juneau, Monroe counties |
| 32 | La Crosse, Trempealeau counties | La Crosse, Trempealeau counties |
| 33 | Ozaukee, Washington, northern Dodge counties | Washington, Waukesha counties |

=== Assembly redistricting ===
==== Summary of changes ====
- 35 districts were left unchanged.
- Dane County went from having 4 districts to 3.
- Dodge County went from having 3 districts to 2.
- Douglas County went from having 1 district to 2.
- Fond du Lac County went from having 3 districts to 2.
- Milwaukee County went from having 14 districts to 15.
- Portage County went from having 1 district to 2.
- No district comprised more than three counties.

==== Assembly districts ====
| County | Districts in 42nd Legislature | Districts in 43rd Legislature | Change |
|---|---|---|---|
| Adams | Shared with Marquette | Shared with Marquette | Steady |
| Ashland | 1 District | Shared with Iron | (Note: Iron County was created from the eastern half of Ashland, so the district was not actually changed.) |
| Barron | 1 District | 1 District | Steady |
| Bayfield | Shared with Burnett, Sawyer, & Washburn | Shared with Sawyer, & Washburn | Steady |
| Brown | 2 Districts | 2 Districts | Steady |
| Buffalo | Shared with Pepin | Shared with Pepin | Steady |
| Burnett | Shared with Bayfield, Sawyer, & Washburn | Shared with Polk | Steady |
| Calumet | 1 District | 1 District | Steady |
| Chippewa | 2 Districts | 2 Districts | Steady |
| Clark | 1 District | 1 District | Steady |
| Columbia | 2 Districts | 2 Districts | Steady |
| Crawford | 1 District | 1 District | Steady |
| Dane | 4 Districts | 3 Districts | ▼ |
| Dodge | 3 Districts | 2 Districts | ▼ |
| Door | 1 District | 1 District | Steady |
| Douglas | 1 District | 2 Districts | ▲ |
| Dunn | 1 District | 1 District | Steady |
| Eau Claire | 2 Districts | 2 Districts | Steady |
| Florence | Shared with Ashland, Forest, Oneida, & Price | Shared with Forest & Langlade | Steady |
| Fond du Lac | 3 Districts | 2 Districts | ▼ |
| Forest | Shared with Florence & Langlade | Shared with Florence & Langlade | Steady |
| Grant | 2 Districts | 2 Districts | Steady |
| Green | 1 District | 1 District | Steady |
| Green Lake | 1 District | 1 District | Steady |
| Iowa | 1 District | 1 District | Steady |
| Iron | Did not exist | Shared with Ashland | |
| Jackson | 1 District | 1 District | Steady |
| Jefferson | 2 Districts | 2 Districts | Steady |
| Juneau | 1 District | 1 District | Steady |
| Kenosha | 1 District | 1 District | Steady |
| Kewaunee | 1 District | 1 District | Steady |
| La Crosse | 2 Districts | 2 Districts | Steady |
| Lafayette | 1 District | 1 District | Steady |
| Langlade | Shared with Florence & Forest | Shared with Florence & Forest | Steady |
| Lincoln | 1 District | Shared with Taylor | ▼ |
| Manitowoc | 2 Districts | 2 Districts | Steady |
| Marathon | 2 Districts | 2 Districts | Steady |
| Marinette | 1 District | 1 District | Steady |
| Marquette | Shared with Adams | Shared with Adams | Steady |
| Milwaukee | 14 Districts | 15 Districts | ▲ |
| Monroe | 1 District | 1 District | Steady |
| Oconto | 1 District | 1 District | Steady |
| Outagamie | 2 Districts | 2 Districts | Steady |
| Ozaukee | 1 District | 1 District | Steady |
| Pepin | Shared with Buffalo | Shared with Buffalo | Steady |
| Pierce | 1 District | 1 District | Steady |
| Polk | 1 District | 1 District | Steady |
| Portage | 1 District | 2 Districts | ▲ |
| Price | Shared with Oneida & Taylor | Shared with Oneida & Vilas | Steady |
| Racine | 2 Districts | 2 Districts | Steady |
| Richland | 1 District | 1 District | Steady |
| Rock | 3 Districts | 3 Districts | Steady |
| Sauk | 2 Districts | 2 Districts | Steady |
| Sawyer | Shared with Bayfield, Burnett, & Washburn | Shared with Bayfield & Washburn | Steady |
| Shawano | 1 District | 1 District | Steady |
| Sheboygan | 3 Districts | 3 Districts | Steady |
| St. Croix | 1 District | 1 District | Steady |
| Taylor | Shared with Oneida & Price | Shared with Lincoln | Steady |
| Trempealeau | 1 District | 1 District | Steady |
| Vernon | 1 District | 1 District | Steady |
| Walworth | 2 Districts | 2 Districts | Steady |
| Washburn | Shared with Bayfield, Burnett, & Sawyer | Shared with Bayfield & Sawyer | Steady |
| Washington | 1 District | 1 District | Steady |
| Waukesha | 2 Districts | 2 Districts | Steady |
| Waupaca | 2 Districts | 2 Districts | Steady |
| Waushara | 1 District | 1 District | Steady |
| Winnebago | 3 Districts | 3 Districts | Steady |
| Wood | 1 District | 1 District | Steady |
