= Charles W. Merriman =

American physician and politician (1856–1930)

Member of the Wisconsin State Assembly from the Rock 3rd district
- In office January 4, 1897 – January 2, 1899
- Preceded by: Fenner Kimball
- Succeeded by: Lowell Holden Parker

Personal details
- Born: June 19, 1856 Beloit, Wisconsin, U.S.
- Died: May 19, 1930 (aged 73) Beloit, Wisconsin, U.S.
- Cause of death: Stroke
- Resting place: Oakwood Cemetery, Beloit, Wisconsin
- Party: Republican
- Spouse: Mary Hopkins Royce (m. 1891–1930)
- Children: Kathryn (Clark)^{(b. 1892; died 1950)}; Elizabeth R. (Hulburt)^{(b. 1894; died 1981)}; Charles Royce Merriman^{(b. 1895; died 1970)}; Dorothy W. Merriman^{(b. 1898; died 1985)}; Fayette Lewis Merriman^{(b. 1905; died 1961)}
- Education: Beloit College; Hahnemann Medical College
- Profession: Physician

Charles Weare Merriman (June 19, 1856 – May 19, 1930) was an American physician, educator, and Republican politician from the Beloit, Wisconsin. He was a member of the Wisconsin State Assembly in 1897, representing southern Rock County.

== Biography ==
Charles W. Merriman was born in Beloit, Wisconsin, in June 1856 and lived most of his life in that city. He was educated in the Beloit public schools and graduated from Beloit high school in 1874.

He received his M.A. from Beloit College in 1879 and was hired as principal of the Danville Academy in Danville, Quebec. After a year, he returned to Wisconsin, where he was employed as principal of the high school at Evansville, Wisconsin, for five years. He then returned to Beloit, where he was principal of the Beloit high school for 1885 and 1886.

He then went to medical school at Hahnemann Medical College in Chicago, where he graduated in 1889. After graduation, he practiced medicine for a year at Wabash, Indiana, then returned to Beloit, in 1890, where he maintained his own medical practice.

That year he was also elected superintendent of schools in Beloit, holding office for the next seven years. During those years, he also served on the city council from 1891 to 1894, and was health officer of the city.

He was elected to the Wisconsin State Assembly in 1896, running on the Republican ticket. He represented Rock County's 3rd Assembly district, which then comprised most of the southern half of the county.

After his term in the Assembly, he was appointed U.S. consul at Brockville, Ontario, by President William McKinley.

He returned to Beloit after a year of service. In his later years, he was active in real estate in the Beloit area, and constructed more than 400 homes in the city. He died of a stroke at his home in Beloit in May 1930.

== Electoral history ==
=== Wisconsin Assembly (1896) ===
Wisconsin Assembly, Waupaca 2nd District Election, 1896
| Party | Candidate | Votes | % | ±% |
|---|---|---|---|---|
General Election, November 3, 1896
| Republican | Charles W. Merriman | 3,157 | 77.19% | +21.35% |
| Democratic | Charles Jones | 928 | 22.69% | −18.29% |
| Independent | Halvor Cleophas (write-in) | 3 | 0.07% | |
| Independent | John Winans (write-in) | 2 | 0.05% | |
| Plurality | | 2,229 | 54.50% | +39.64% |
| Total votes | | 4,090 | 100.0% | +8.55% |
| Republican hold | | | | |

Wisconsin State Assembly
| Preceded by Fenner Kimball | Member of the Wisconsin State Assembly from the Rock 3rd district January 4, 1897 – January 2, 1899 | Succeeded by Lowell Holden Parker |
