= Joseph Rechlicz =

19th century Polish American politician

Member of the Wisconsin State Assembly from the Milwaukee 5th district
- In office March 8, 1899 – January 7, 1901
- Preceded by: Albert Woyciechowski
- Succeeded by: Fred Esau

Personal details
- Born: March 21, 1862 Posen, Province of Posen, Kingdom of Prussia
- Died: September 23, 1921 (aged 59) Milwaukee, Wisconsin, U.S.
- Resting place: Saint Adalberts Cemetery, Milwaukee
- Party: Democratic
- Spouse: Anna Kantak
- Children: Marta Rechlicz^{(b. 1888; died 1888)}; Helen Krolikowski^{(b. 1890; died 1938)}; Ludwicka "Louise" (Bucholtz)^{(b. 1892; died 1950)}; Mary Rechlicz^{(b. 1894; died 1894)}; Adam Rechlicz^{(b. 1895; died 1908)}; Edward Julian Rechlicz^{(b. 1896; died 1922)}; Ewa Rechlicz^{(b. 1899; died 1899)}
- Occupation: Laborer, merchant

Jozef T. (Joseph) Rechlicz (March 21, 1862 – September 23, 1921) was a Polish American immigrant, merchant, and Democratic politician. He was a member of the Wisconsin State Assembly, representing the south side of the city of Milwaukee during the 1899 session.

== Biography ==
Jozef Rechlicz was born in Poznań, in what is now western Poland. At the time of his birth, the area was part of the Kingdom of Prussia. As a child, he emigrated to the United States with his parents and came to Milwaukee, Wisconsin, in 1880. He immediately went to work as a laborer at the E. P. Allis manufacturing company. He remained there for many years and was promoted to work as a shipping clerk.

In the 1890s, he started his own business, operating a grocery and saloon.

He was active in the Polish American and Catholic communities in Milwaukee; he was secretary of the St. Stanislaus Mutual Aid Association, a co-founder of the Polish Association of America, and a member of the board of trustees of the United Catholic societies of the United States.

During the 1899 Wisconsin legislative session, incumbent state representative Albert Woyciechowski died of a sudden case of pneumonia. Local Democrats quickly coalesced around Rechlicz as their choice to succeed Woyciechowski. A special election was held February 28, 1899, in which Rechlicz defeated Republican F. J. Holtz with 60% of the vote. He did not run for re-election in 1900.

Rechlicz died in Milwaukee on September 23, 1921.

== Personal life and family ==
Rechlicz was a son of John Rechlicz and his wife Justina (née Brzezińska). Jozef Rechlicz married Anna Kantak, also an immigrant from Polish Prussia. They had seven children, though three died in infancy and two others died relatively young.

Wisconsin State Assembly
Preceded by Albert Woyciechowski	Member of the Wisconsin State Assembly from the Milwaukee 5th district March 8, 1899 – January 7, 1901	Succeeded by Fred Esau
