= Yorkey =

Yorkey is a surname. Notable people with the surname include:

- Brian Yorkey (born 1970), American playwright and lyricist
- John H. Yorkey (1856–1907), American politician

== See also ==
- Yerkey
- Yorkey Crossing
- Yorkeys Knob, Queensland
