= George Paul Miller (Wisconsin politician) =

American businessman and politician (1868–1930)

George P. Miller

Member of the Wisconsin Senate from the 26th district
- In office January 7, 1901 – January 2, 1905
- Preceded by: Chauncey B. Welton
- Succeeded by: Albert M. Stondall

Personal details
- Born: February 18, 1868 Sheboygan Falls, Wisconsin, U.S.
- Died: November 26, 1930 (aged 62) Richwoods Township, Peoria County, Illinois, U.S.
- Resting place: Forest Hill Cemetery, Madison, Wisconsin
- Party: Republican
- Spouse: Ann Lee (m. 1892–1930)
- Children: Gladys (Brady); George P. Miller Jr.; Nancy Lee Miller
- Education: Ripon College
- Occupation: businessman

George Paul Miller (February 18, 1868 – November 26, 1930) was an American businessman and Republican politician. He was a member of the Wisconsin State Senate, representing Dane County during the 1901 and 1903 sessions.

== Biography ==
George Miller was born in Sheboygan Falls, Wisconsin, in February 1868. He was raised and educated there, graduating from Sheboygan Falls High School and going on to attend Ripon College, in Fond du Lac County, Wisconsin.

He moved to Madison, Wisconsin, in 1891 and established the Miller Lumber Company, a manufacturing and lumber-dealing business. He quickly became involved in local politics and was elected president of the Republican League Club in 1896, and chairman of the Republican City Committee of Madison in 1897.

He was elected to the Wisconsin State Senate in 1900, running in the 26th Senate district, which then comprised all of Dane County. He served a four-year term and was not a candidate for re-election in 1904.

Subsequently, he became involved in the relatively new automobile business and established a dealership in Madison in partnership with Emil Hokanson—one of the first such dealerships in Dane County.

He moved to Chicago about 1919, and was president of the Marmon Sales Company for most of the rest of his life. He retired in 1930, and died at his home in Richwoods Township, Peoria County, Illinois, on November 26, 1930.

== Personal life and family ==
George P. Miller was one of at least three children born to Phillip Miller and his wife Marie (née Duhogue). George Miller married Ann Lee in 1892 and had three children. At his death, he left an estate worth about 1.4 million dollars to his children (about 25 million dollars adjusted for inflation).

== Electoral history ==
=== Wisconsin Senate (1900) ===
Wisconsin Senate, 26th District Election, 1900
Party	Candidate	Votes	%	±%
General Election, November 6, 1900
Republican	George P. Miller	8,997	56.3%	+0.1%
Democratic	N. C. Evans	6,496	40.6%	−0.5%
Prohibition	H. A. Miner	498	3.1%	+0.4%
Plurality		2,501	15.6%	+0.6%
Total votes		15,991	100%	-0.4%
Republican hold				

Wisconsin Senate
Preceded by Chauncey B. Welton	Member of the Wisconsin Senate from the 26th district January 7, 1901 – January 2, 1905	Succeeded by Albert M. Stondall
