= Dengel =

Dengel is a surname. Notable people with the name include:

- Anna Maria Dengel, (1892–1980), Austrian physician, religious sister and missionary
- Edward J. Dengel (1866–1943), American politician and businessman
- Lebna Dengel or Dawit II (1496–1540), Emperor of Ethiopia from 1508 to 1540
- Philipp Dengel (1888–1948), German communist journalist and politician
- Sahle Dengel (1778–1855), Emperor of Ethiopia between 1832 and 1855
- Sarsa Dengel (1550–1597), Emperor of Ethiopia, known as Sarsa the Great
- Za Dengel (died 1604), Atsnaf Sagad II, Emperor of Ethiopia from 1603 to 1604

== See also ==
- Dengel Ber, town in western Ethiopia
