= Charles N. Frink =

American politician and businessman

Charles Nathan Frink (July 20, 1860 – ?) was an American travelling salesman and insurance executive from Milwaukee, Wisconsin, who served one term as a Populist member of the Wisconsin State Assembly from Milwaukee. He was the only Populist to serve in the Wisconsin State Legislature.

== Background ==
Frink was born July 20, 1860, in Rochester, New York, and was educated in South Bend, Indiana, and at Valparaiso Normal School, now Valparaiso University. He worked as a traveling salesman from 1880 to 1887, and came to Wisconsin in 1888, living first in Janesville from 1888 to 1891, then moving to Milwaukee; there he went into the insurance business, and became president and general manager of the American Casualty Association, a mutual insurance group incorporated in 1895 and headquartered in that city.

== Assembly ==
He was elected to the Assembly's Fifth Milwaukee County district (the 5th and 12th Wards of the City of Milwaukee) in 1896 as a Populist (but was also the Democratic nominee), receiving 2,621 votes, to 2,447 for Republican T. L. Mitchell and 39 for Socialist Labor candidate Carl Kowalsky (Republican incumbent Albert Woller was not a candidate). He declared his party affiliation as "Populist", the only Wisconsin officeholder elected as a fusion candidate in 1896 to do so (the others all declared themselves to be Democrats, in the wake of the unsuccessful 1896 experiment with Democratic/Populist fusion). He was assigned to the standing committees on finance, banks and insurance; and on public health and sanitation. In this district, the Populists had outpolled the Democrats in the 1894 election.

He was not a candidate for re-election in 1898, and was succeeded by Democrat Albert Woyciechowski. (The Populists ran their own candidate.)
