= Emilus =

Emilus is a masculine given name and a surname. Notable people with the name include:

- Emilus Goodell (1848–1920), American politician
- Samuel Emilus (born 1997), Canadian football player
