= George W. Taylor (Wisconsin politician) =

American politician (1855–1931)

Member of the Wisconsin State Assembly from the Marinette district
- In office January 7, 1895 – January 2, 1899
- Preceded by: Charles C. Daily
- Succeeded by: Robert O. Hunt

Personal details
- Born: March 31, 1855 Wenham, Massachusetts, U.S.
- Died: January 27, 1931 (aged 75) Burlington, Ontario, Canada
- Resting place: Graceland Cemetery, Chicago
- Party: Republican
- Spouse: Ella Francis Case (m. 1882–1931)
- Children: George Irving Taylor^{(b. 1884; died 1885)}; John Case Taylor^{(b. 1886; died 1921)}

George William Taylor (March 31, 1855 – January 27, 1931) was an American businessman and Republican politician. He was a member of the Wisconsin State Assembly, representing Marinette County in the 1895 and 1897 sessions.

== Biography ==
George W. Taylor was born in Wenham, Massachusetts, in 1855. He was educated in the schools in Middletown and Hartford, Connecticut, and then went to work in the lumber business. He lived for 14 years in Chicago and worked for the lumber firm D. K. Pearsons & Co.

He moved to northern Wisconsin in 1890, settling first at Oconto, Wisconsin, before moving to Marinette in 1892.

Two years after his arrival, he was elected to the Wisconsin State Assembly from Marinette County, running on the Republican ticket. He was re-elected in 1894.

After leaving office, he moved to Burlington, Ontario, where he died in February 1931.

== Personal life and family ==
George W. Taylor was a son of Reverend Dr. Jeremiah Taylor, a prominent Congregationalist minister in Massachusetts and Rhode Island. The Taylors were descendants of John Alden, a crew member on the historic 1620 Mayflower voyage and a signer of the Mayflower Compact.

George Taylor married Ella Frances Case of Simsbury, Connecticut, on March 16, 1882. They had at least two children, though one son died in infancy.

Taylor was heavily involved in Freemasonry and was a 33rd degree mason.

== Electoral history ==
=== Wisconsin Assembly (1894, 1896) ===
Wisconsin Assembly, Marinette District Election, 1894
Party	Candidate	Votes	%	±%
General Election, November 6, 1894
Republican	George W. Taylor	2,866	56.60%	+14.62%
Democratic	Amos Holgate	2,059	40.66%	−3.93%
Prohibition	Jacob O. Lindern	139	2.74%	−0.72%
Plurality		807	15.94%	+13.33%
Total votes		5,064	100.0%	+19.10%
Republican gain from Democratic				

Wisconsin Assembly, Marinette District Election, 1896
Party	Candidate	Votes	%	±%
General Election, November 3, 1896
Republican	George W. Taylor (incumbent)	4,098	67.30%	+10.71%
Democratic	John E. Wilson	1,991	32.70%	−7.96%
Plurality		2,107	34.60%	+18.67%
Total votes		6,089	100.0%	+20.24%
Republican hold				

Wisconsin State Assembly
Preceded by Charles C. Daily	Member of the Wisconsin State Assembly from the Marinette district January 7, 1895 – January 2, 1899	Succeeded by Robert O. Hunt
