= Lowell Holden Parker =

19th century American politician

L. Holden Parker

Member of the Wisconsin State Assembly from the Rock 3rd district
- In office January 2, 1899 – January 7, 1901
- Preceded by: Charles W. Merriman
- Succeeded by: Halvor Cleophas

Personal details
- Born: November 30, 1848 Belvidere, Illinois, U.S.
- Died: December 12, 1937 (aged 89) San Francisco, California, U.S.
- Resting place: Stockton Rural Cemetery, Stockton, California
- Party: Republican
- Spouse: Elinor Dudley (died 1931)
- Children: Elinor (Wells)^{(b. 1886; died 1956)}; Carolyn (Bushell)^{(b. 1897; died 1973)}
- Parent: Charles H. Parker (father)
- Education: University of Michigan
- Profession: Lawyer, banker

Lowell Holden Parker (November 30, 1848 – December 12, 1937) was an American lawyer, banker, manufacturer, and Republican politician from Beloit, Wisconsin. He served a single term in the Wisconsin State Assembly, representing Rock County's 3rd Assembly district in the 1899 session. During his business and political career, his name was often abbreviated as L. Holden Parker. His father, Charles H. Parker, also served in the Wisconsin State Assembly.

== Biography ==
Born in Belvidere, Illinois, on November 30, 1848, Parker went to Beloit College and then graduated from the University of Michigan in 1875. He practiced law in Beloit, Wisconsin. Park served on the Beloit School Board. He was involved with manufacturing of harvesters and binders. He was also in the banking business. Parker died on December 12, 1937, in San Francisco, California, at age 89.

Wisconsin State Assembly
Preceded by Charles W. Merriman	Member of the Wisconsin State Assembly from the Rock 3rd district January 2, 1899 – January 7, 1901	Succeeded by Halvor Cleophas
