= John Fritz Farmstead =

- U.S. National Register of Historic Places
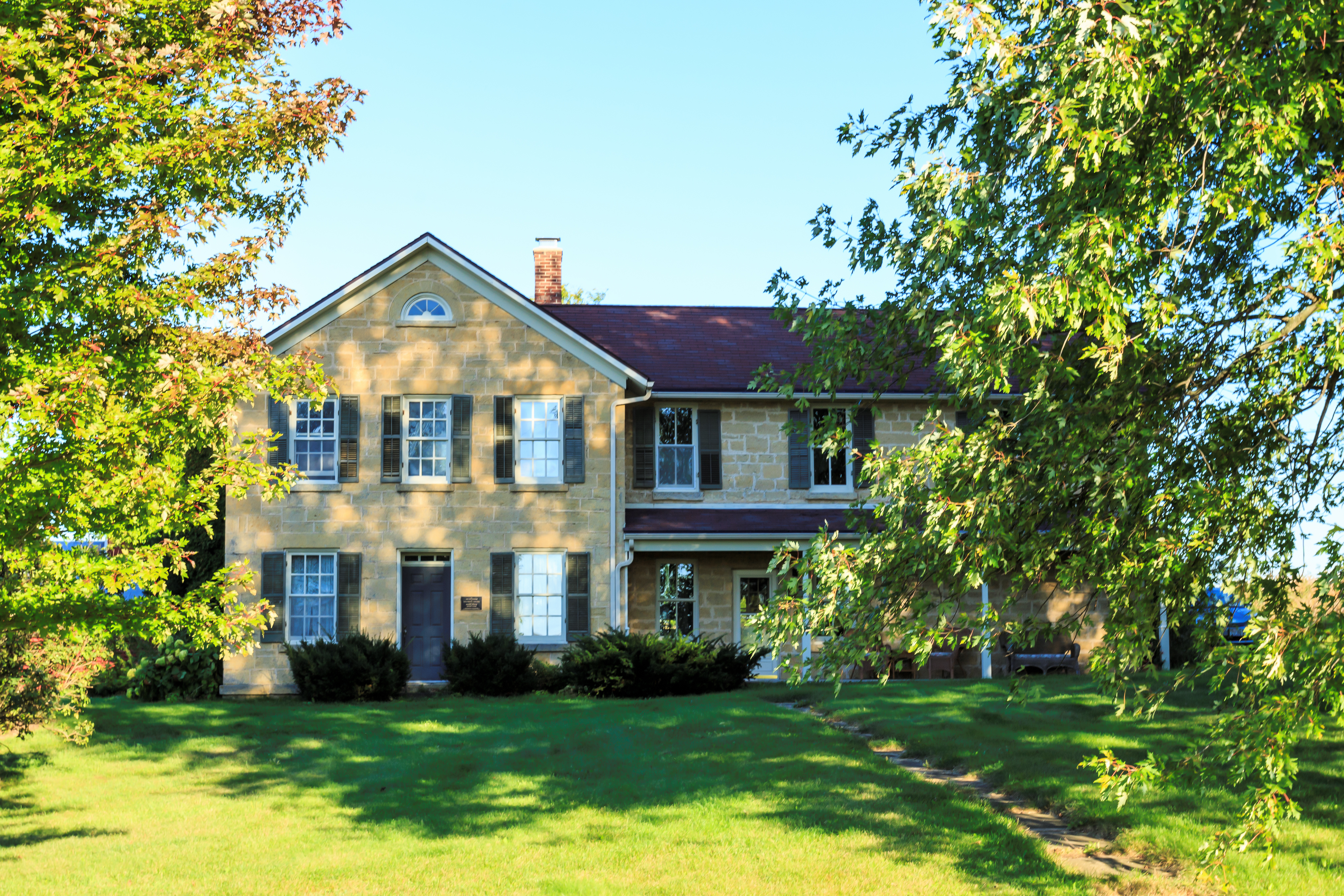
- Part of the farmstead.
- Location: 642 Fritz Rd., Montrose, Wisconsin
- Coordinates: 42°53′24″N 89°35′46″W
- Area: 2.8 acres (1.1 ha)
- Architect: William and Henry Oakey
- NRHP reference No.: 98000879
- Added to NRHP: July 15, 1998

The John Fritz Farmstead is located in Montrose, Wisconsin. It was added to the National Register of Historic Places, along with the State Register of Historic Places, in 1998.

John Fritz was born in Kindenheim, Bavaria in 1826. When he was ten, his family migrated to New York State. Around 1848 the family moved west to the wilds of Wisconsin. In 1849 John started a farm a few miles west in the Town of Primrose, with his family nearby, but a year later he bought the first 200 acres of this farm. Settlement of Montrose had begun in 1840, so Fritz wasn't the first settler, but he was early.

A log house was on the farm when John bought it. None of the buildings from those early years remain. In those early years John raised wheat to sell. He also had a few milk cows and made butter from their milk. He had a few other cattle, and more pigs than the neighbors. He grew oats, hay and potatoes. Most of these animals and crops would have been familiar to Bavarian farmers.

John had married Julia Colby, a Norwegian immigrant, but she died in 1853. In 1854 he remarried, to Betsey Elefson, another Norwegian. While some early German immigrants in Dane County clustered together, the town of Montrose was fairly mixed already, with immigrants from the Northeast, North Carolina, England, Ireland and Sweden. By the 1860 census John and Betsey had five children. Some time after that they divorced and John married Betsey's sister Margaret. By the 1870 census they had a total of seven children in the house.

In 1868 the growing family built a new house, the north wing of the current house, at left in the photo. It is 23 by 29 feet, two stories, with walls of coursed limestone sitting on a foundation of random rubble. On the front, the mortar is tooled into a raised bead. Windows and the door on the front are all symmetric, with a lunette window in the gable. The first floor of the south wing was added about ten years later, with the second floor completed by the early 1890s. The south wing is built of stone and technique similar to the earlier section, except that the walls sat directly on the ground without footings.

The basement barn was built in the late 1800s. The barn is 76 by 36 feet, on a random stone foundation. Its northern 22 feet may have been added after the south end. The basement is laid out with a center aisle. An earthen ramp gives access to the haymow. The concrete silo was added in the 1920s and the bull pen and milk house later. The wooden granary was built around 1900. The square of farm buildings also includes a corn crib and piggery built by the late 1940s

John's third wife Margaret died in 1886, and he married Thursa Rice Lawrence. John and Thursa moved to nearby Belleville in 1906 and died shortly after. Some time before that, John's son Marcus bought the farm. Marcus and his wife Laura had expanded the farm to 393 acres by 1914. Marcus died in 1925 and his sons Stanley and Clarence ran the firm until 1976. As of 1998, the farm was still in the Fritz family.
