= NISS =

NISS may refer to:

- National Intelligence and Security Service, an Ethiopian government agency which gathers information and is tasked with preserving national interest.
- National Institute of Statistical Sciences, an American institute that researches statistical science and quantitative analysis
- the National Intelligence and Security Service, the former intelligence service of Sudan, renamed/reorganised in 2019 as the General Intelligence Service (Sudan)
- Nordic Institute of Stage and Studio
- Charles Niss (1861–1938), American politician and businessman
- Thorvald Niss (1842–1905), Danish painter
