= Yerkey =

Yerkey is a surname. Notable people with the surname include:

- Gary G. Yerkey (fl. 2015), American journalist
- Stephen Yerkey (born 1950), American singer-songwriter

== See also ==
- Berkey
- Yerkes (surname)
- Yorkey
