= Whitestown =

Whitestown may refer to several places in the United States:

- Whitestown, Indiana
- Whitestown, New York
- Whitestown, Wisconsin
