= Albert Woller =

Albert Woller may refer to:

- Albert Woller (Republican) (1861–?), insurance agent, real estate agent and Republican politician from Milwaukee
- Albert F. Woller (1886–?), machinist, auto mechanic and Socialist politician from Milwaukee
