= Peter W. Matts =

American politician

Peter W. Matts (June 20, 1814 – July 2, 1903) was a member of the Wisconsin State Assembly.

== Biography ==
Matts was born on June 20, 1814, in Bucks County, Pennsylvania. In 1842, he married Helen R. Dickson. They had seven children. Matts and his wife were affiliated with the Second Adventists.

Eventually, Matts settled in Madison, Wisconsin Territory. He settled what is now Paoli, Wisconsin, where he opened the Paoli Mills, now listed on the National Register of Historic Places. Matts also served in the Wisconsin State Militia, achieving the rank of major. He died on July 2, 1903, and was buried in Paoli.

== Political career ==
Matts was elected sheriff of Dane County in 1846 and re-elected in 1848 after statehood as a Whig. He was elected to the Assembly in 1853 and served during the 1854 session as a Republican. Other positions Matts held include chairman (similar to mayor) of the town board (similar to city council) of Montrose, Wisconsin, and justice of the peace.
