= Paoli, Wisconsin =

- Unincorporated community
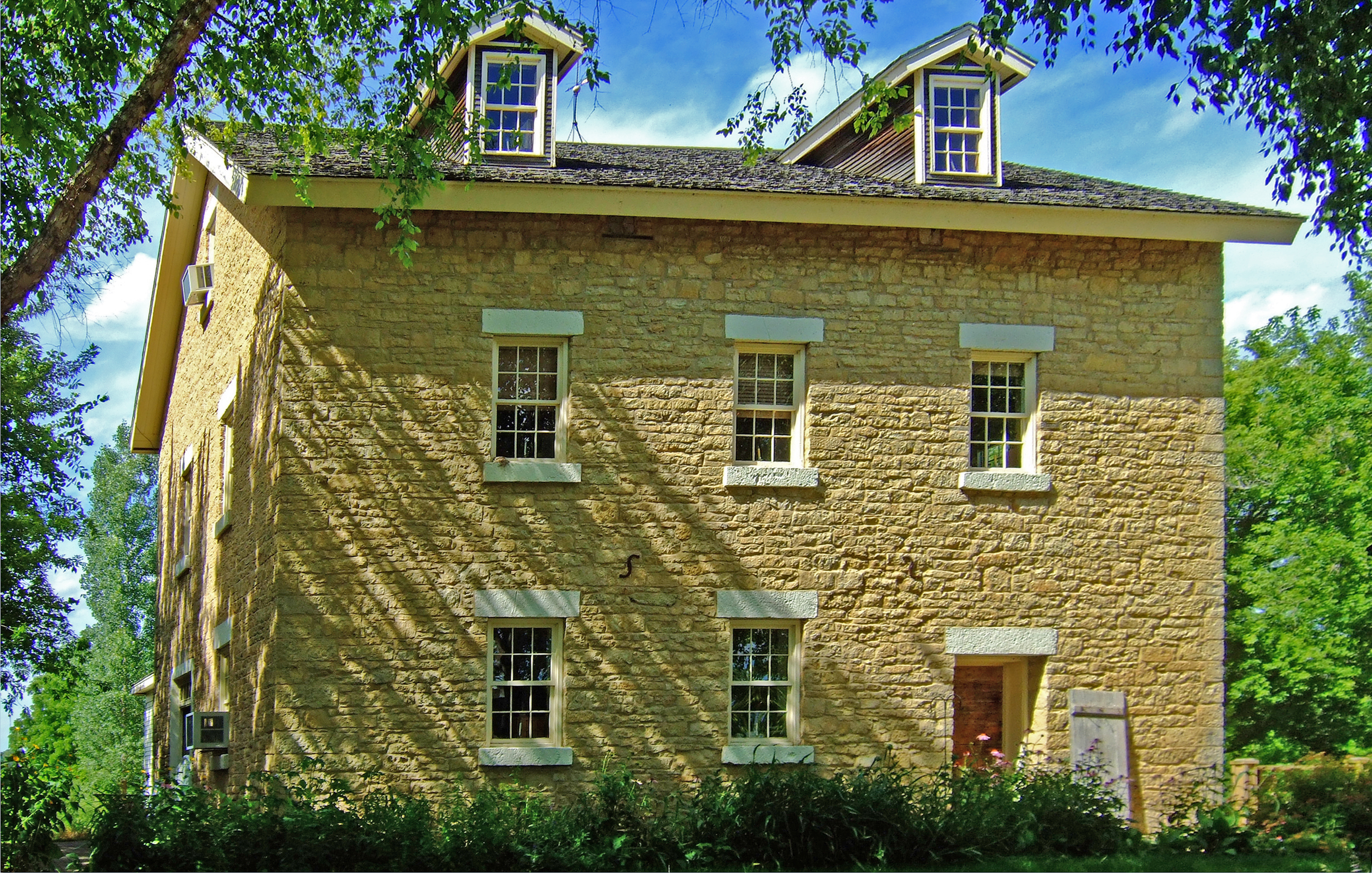
- Paoli Mills, listed on the National Register of Historic Places

- Location within Wisconsin Location within the United States
- Coordinates: 42°55′46″N 89°31′25″W
- Country: United States
- State: Wisconsin
- County: Dane County
- Town: Montrose
- Elevation: 899 ft (274 m)
- Time zone: UTC-6 (Central (CST))
  - Summer (DST): UTC-5 (CDT)
- Area code: 608
- GNIS feature ID: 1571009

Paoli is an unincorporated community in the town of Montrose, in Dane County, Wisconsin, United States.

== Notable people ==
- Peter W. Matts - Wisconsin State Representative
- Oscar F. Minch - Wisconsin State Representative
