= Basco, Wisconsin =

- Unincorporated community
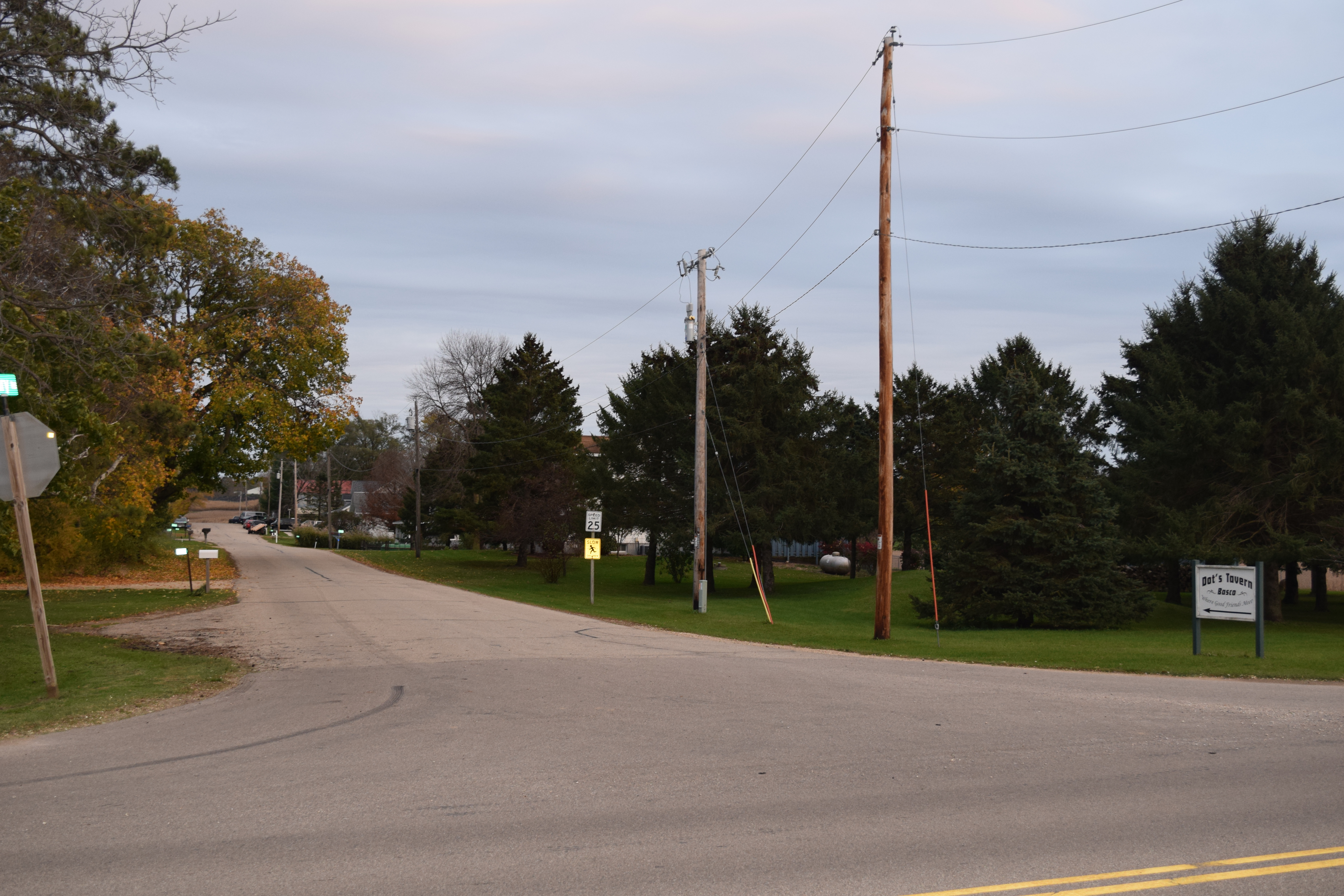

- Location within Wisconsin Location within the United States
- Coordinates: 42°54′43″N 89°30′53″W
- Country: United States
- State: Wisconsin
- County: Dane County
- Town: Montrose
- Elevation: 902 ft (275 m)
- Time zone: UTC-6 (Central (CST))
  - Summer (DST): UTC-5 (CDT)
- Area code: 608
- GNIS feature ID: 1561217

Basco is an unincorporated community in the town of Montrose, in Dane County, Wisconsin, United States. Basco is located less than 15 miles from Madison.

The community is named for Basco, Illinois. It once had a post office, which opened in September 1889.
