= Paoli Mills =

- U.S. National Register of Historic Places
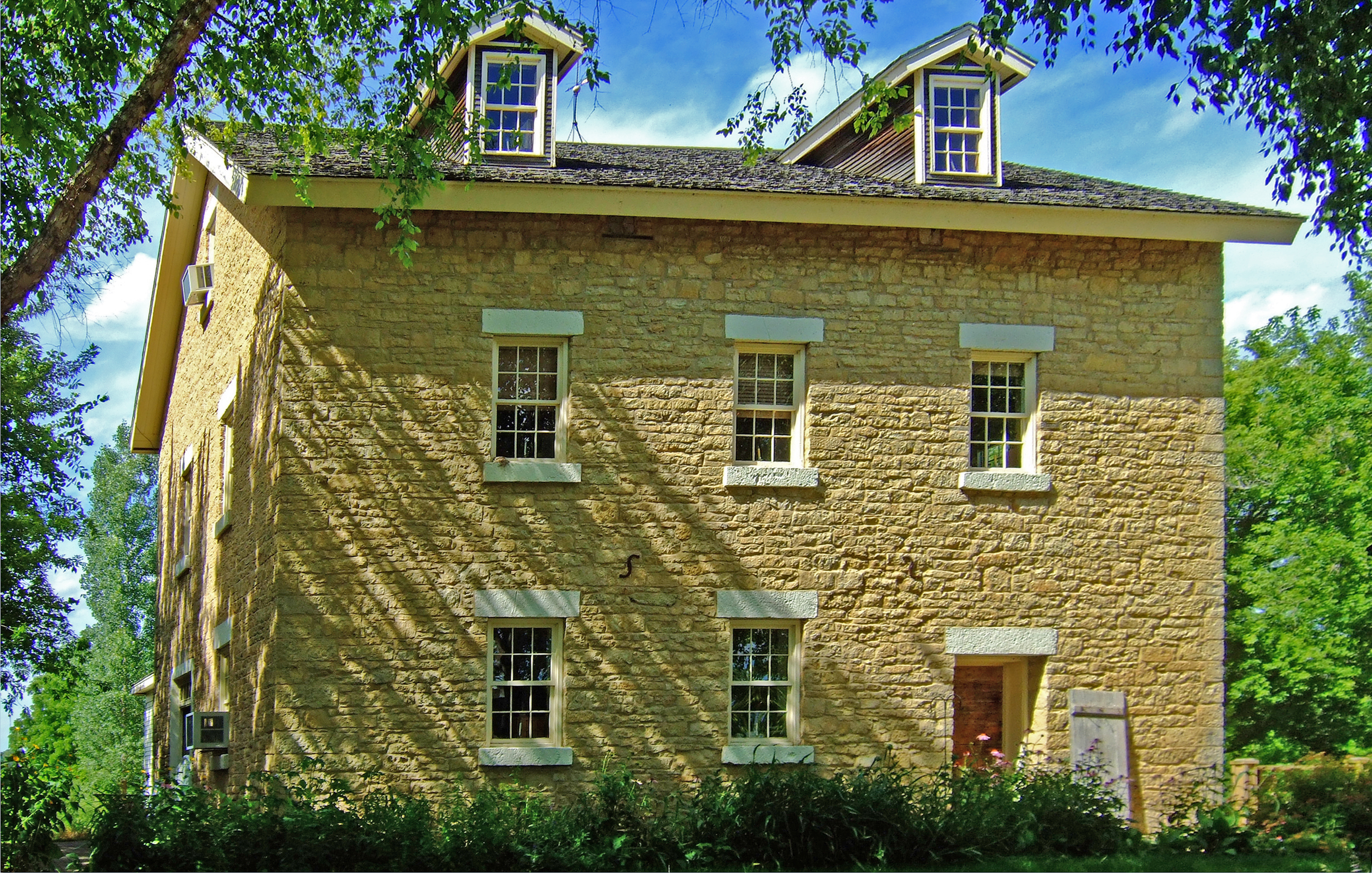
- One of the buildings on the site.
- Location: 6890 Sun Valley Pkwy., Paoli, Wisconsin
- Coordinates: 42°55′47″N 89°31′31″W
- Area: 0.5 acres (0.20 ha)
- Built: 1849
- Architect: Peter W. Matts
- NRHP reference No.: 79000337
- Added to NRHP: March 30, 1979

The Paoli Mills is an early mill complex on the Sugar River in Paoli, Wisconsin, including the remains of a sawmill built in 1849 and a largely intact flour mill begun in the 1860s. In 1979 the complex was added to the National Register of Historic Places.

== History ==
In 1849 Peter W. Matts founded the hamlet of Paoli by building a sawmill on the Sugar River. He constructed a wooden dam upstream from the mill and dug a millrace channel a half mile long from the dam to his mill, producing a ten-foot head of water. Matts was at the time Sheriff of Dane County, Wisconsin and would later be a member of the Wisconsin State Assembly. The original sawmill was a wooden structure on the north side of the millrace. Only some of the structural beams remain from that original sawmill.

In the 1860s brothers Bernhard and Francis Minch, immigrants from Bavaria, came to work at the mill. They eventually took over the mill from Matts and in the 1860s they built the 3-story stone flouring mill that sits on top of the millrace. In 1870 they milled 22,000 bushels of grain and sawed lumber in the sawmill. The sawmill ceased operation around 1877, but the flour mill was upgraded and expanded, and other Minches took over the operation. One of them, Oscar F. Minch, also became a member of the Wisconsin State Assembly.

The Minches' stone section of the mill has walls of coursed limestone rubble, three feet thick at the base. Each floor up, the wall becomes six inches thinner, forming a ledge on which the floor joists rest. Much of the milling machinery is intact. In the basement are three Leffel turbines: 20, 30 and 40 horsepower. On the first floor are two E.P. Allis roller mills from the 1880s, and a "Midget Marvel" multi-stage milling machine manufactured about 1900 or 1910. On the 2nd floor are E.P. Allis purifiers from the 1880s, and on the 3rd are E.P. Allis flour dressers from the 1880s.

In 1938, Paul Fetherston bought the mill complex and used it for its original purpose for several years before he and his family converted it into a warehouse for their feed and seed business.

The mill complex was listed on the National Register of Historic Places in 1979 and on the State Register of Historic Places in 1989.
