= Yerkes =

Yerkes may refer to:

- Yerkes (surname), notable people with this surname
- Yerkes, Kentucky
- Yerkes, Pennsylvania
- Yerkes Observatory, an astronomical observatory of the University of Chicago
  - Yerkes luminosity classification of stars
  - Yerkes scheme of galaxy morphological classification
- Yerkes National Primate Research Center, one of eight national primate research centers funded by the National Institutes of Health, located in Atlanta, Georgia at Emory University
- Yerkes–Dodson law, an empirical relationship between arousal and performance first noted by Robert M. Yerkes and John Dillingham Dodson
- 990 Yerkes, main belt asteroid
- Yerkes (crater), on the Moon
