= George Sheffer =

American politician

George Sheffer was an American politician. He was a member of the Wisconsin State Assembly during the 1897 session. Sheffer represented Lafayette County, Wisconsin. He was a Republican.
