= Fenner Kimball =

American politician

Fenner Kimball (October 6, 1822 – March 6, 1899) was an American manufacturer, businessman, and politician.

Born in North Scituate, Providence County, Rhode Island, Kimball moved to Fall River, Massachusetts, where he worked as a carpenter. Kimball then moved to East Greenwich, Rhode Island, where he continued to work as a carpenter. While living in East Greenwich, Kimball served on the East Greenwich Town Council and was president of the town council and the court of probate. In 1856, Kimball moved to Wisconsin and farmed in the town of La Prairie, Rock County, Wisconsin. He then moved to Janesville, Wisconsin, in 1863, where he operated the Janesville Furniture Company. He was also in the hardware business and was involved with the Throughgood & Company that manufactured cigar boxes. Kimball served on the Rock County Board of Supervisors and was chairman of the county board. In 1878 and 1895, Kimball served in the Wisconsin State Assembly and was a Republican. Kimball died at his home in Janesville, Wisconsin from the effects of malaria Kimball had gotten, as a result of a trip to Florida for his health.
