= Abraham L. Grootemaat =

American politician

Abraham Lincoln Grootemaat (December 12, 1864 – April 30, 1939) was an American business and politician.

Born in Milwaukee, Wisconsin, Grootemaat went to business college in Milwaukee. He was president of A. J. Grootemaat and Sons, Inc. which dealt with real estate, insurance, and mortgages. From 1892 to 1897, Grootemaat served on the Milwaukee Common Council. In 1899, Grootemaat served in the Wisconsin State Assembly and was a Republican. Grootemaat died at his home in Milwaukee, Wisconsin.
