= Francis B. Keene =

American politician (1856–1945)

Francis Bowler Keene (December 11, 1856 – 1945) was an American diplomat and politician.

== Biography ==
Keene was born n December 11, 1856 to Rev. David Keene and Susan Elizabeth (Bowler) Keene in Milwaukee, Wisconsin. On November 8, 1893, he married Emerin Price Semple (1857–1936). He died in 1945 in Italy and is interred at the Campo Cestio cemetery in Rome.

== Career ==
Keene was a member of the Wisconsin State Assembly from 1899 to 1901 sessions. From 1903 to 1905, he served as U.S. Consul in Florence, Italy, and in Geneva, Switzerland from 1905 to 1915. He served as U.S. Consul General in Zurich, Switzerland from 1915 to 1917, followed by Rome, Italy from 1917 to 1924. Aside from politics, he worked as an engineer, a coal sales agent, and a newspaper editor. Keene was a Republican. He died in 1945, aged 88 or 89.
