= John Fremont Burnham =

American politician

John Fremont Burnham (born June 23, 1856) was an American politician. He was a member of the Wisconsin State Assembly.

== Biography ==
Burnham was born on June 23, 1856 in Milwaukee, Wisconsin. He attended the University of Notre Dame.

== Career ==
Burnham was elected to the Assembly in 1896. Previously, he was Sheriff of Waukesha County, Wisconsin from 1889 to 1890. He had been an unsuccessful candidate for the Assembly in 1884. Burnham was a Republican.
