= John McGreer =

American politician

John McGreer was a member of the Wisconsin State Assembly.

== Biography ==
McGreer was born on May 5, 1849, in Jordan, Wisconsin. He moved to Sharon, Portage County, Wisconsin, in 1865 and to Antigo, Wisconsin, in 1893. McGreer was a farmer and a real estate dealer by trade.

== Political career ==
McGreer was a member of the Assembly during the 1899 session. Other positions he held include chairman (similar to mayor) of the town board (similar to city council) and town clerk of Antigo and justice of the peace. He was a Democrat.
