= Chauncey B. Welton =

American businessman and politician

Chauncey Brunson Welton (September 1, 1844 – January 2, 1908) was an American businessman and politician.

Born in Sharon Center, Medina County, Ohio, Welton moved to Wisconsin in 1855. He then moved back to Ohio in 1858. During the American Civil War, Welton served in the 103rd Ohio Infantry from 1862 to 1865. After the Civil War, Welton was in the mercantile business and lived in Allegan, Michigan, Kalamazoo, Michigan, Rockton, Wisconsin, and Windsor, Wisconsin. In 1881, Welton served as town clerk for Whitestown, Wisconsin in Vernon County, Wisconsin. Then, in 1884, Welton permanently moved to Madison, Wisconsin and was the owner of a clothing business. From 1897 to 1901, Welton served in the Wisconsin State Senate and was a Republican. Welton died at his home in Madison, Wisconsin.
