= Yerkes (surname) =

Yerkes is a surname. Notable people with the surname include:

- Bob Yerkes (1932–2024), American stuntman
- Carroll Yerkes (1903–1950), American baseball pitcher
- Charles Yerkes (1837–1905), American financier and art collector involved with developing mass-transit systems
- Harry Yerkes (1872–1954), American marimba player, inventor, and recording manager
- Mary Agnes Yerkes (1886–1989), American Impressionist painter, photographer, and artisan
- Robert Yerkes (1876–1956), American psychologist, ethologist, and primatologist
- Roberta Yerkes Blanshard (1907–2001), American editor
- Royden Yerkes (1881–1964), American Episcopal priest and theologian
- Stan Yerkes (1874–1940), American baseball pitcher
- Steve Yerkes (1888–1971), American baseball player

== See also ==
- Yerkes (disambiguation)
- Merritt Yerkes Hughes (1893–1971), American professor and expert in French, English, and Italian literature
- Tracy Yerkes Thomas (1899–1983), American mathematician
