= Rockton, Wisconsin =

Unincorporated community in Wisconsin, United States

- Unincorporated community
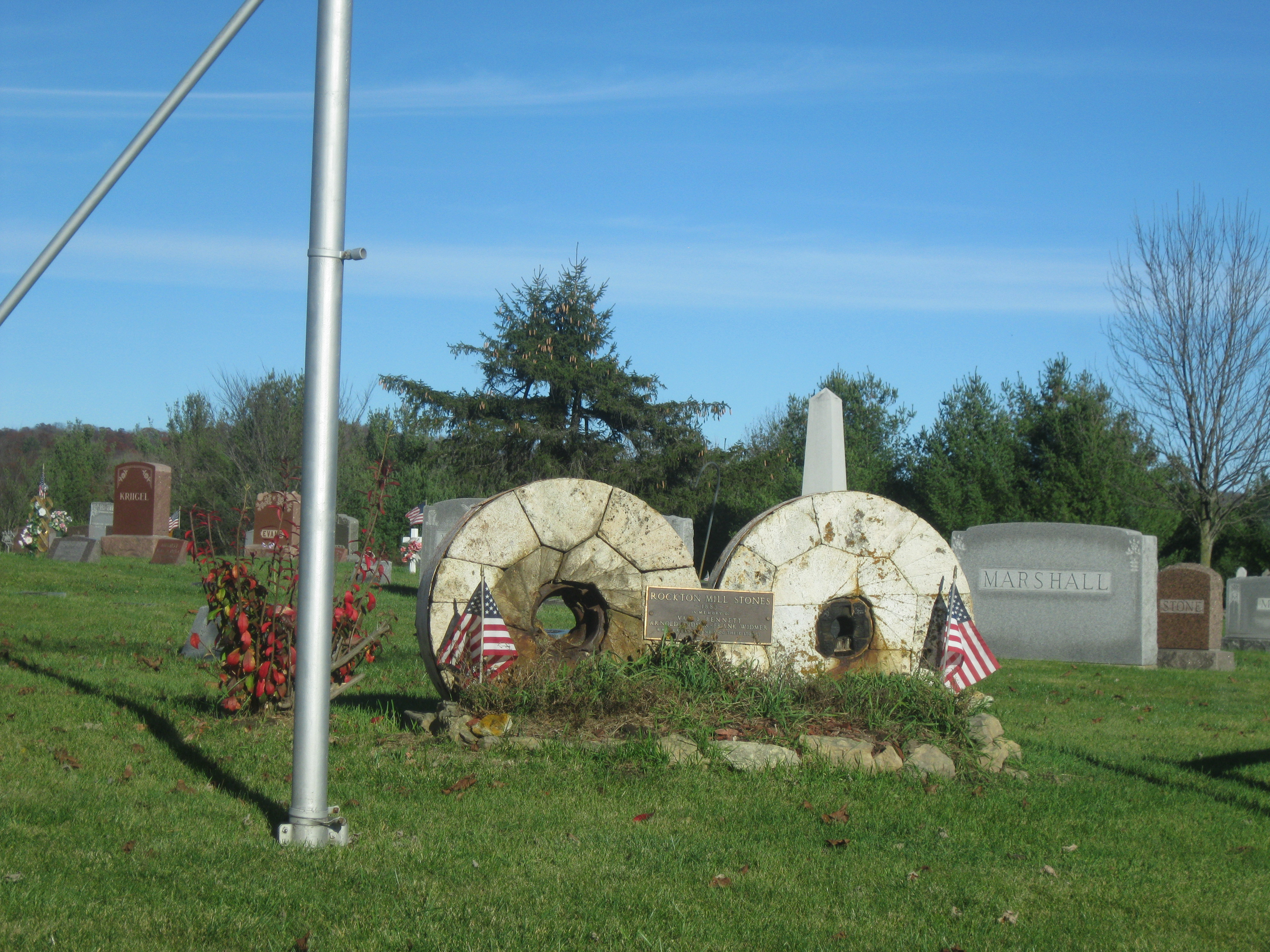
- Rockton Mill Stones

- Location within Wisconsin Location within the United States
- Coordinates: 43.641°N 90.602°W
- Country: United States
- State: Wisconsin
- County: Vernon
- Elevation: 873 ft (266 m)
- Time zone: UTC-6 (Central (CST))
  - Summer (DST): UTC-5 (CDT)
- Area code: 608
- GNIS feature ID: 1572487

Rockton is an unincorporated community in Vernon County, Wisconsin, United States in the town of Whitestown. It is located on the Kickapoo River and is served by Wisconsin Highway 131. Rockton is south of Ontario and north of La Farge; these are the closest villages to the community.

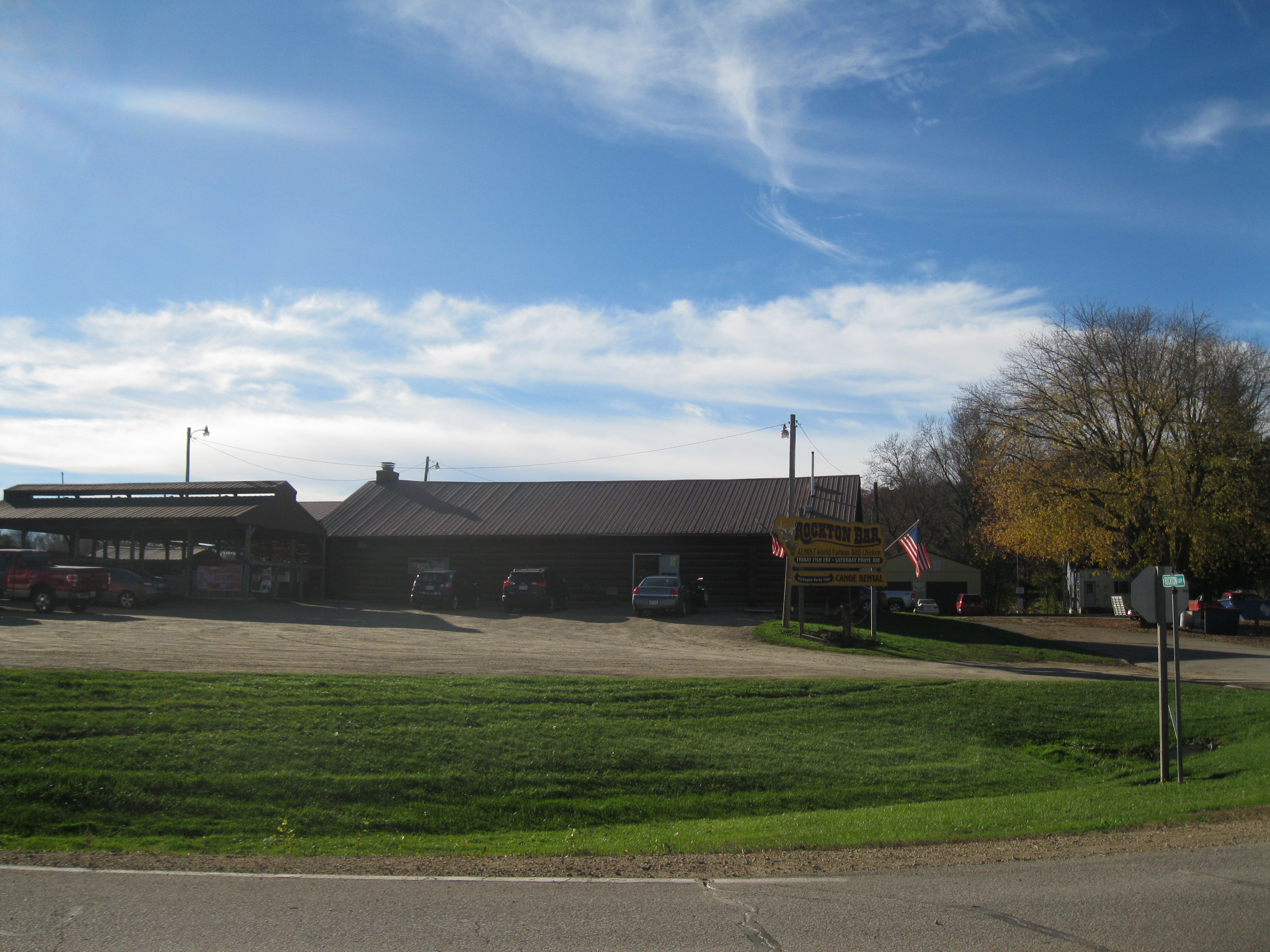
Rockton Bar
