= David Evans Jr. =

American politician

David Lloyd Evans Jr. (1848–1929) was a member of the Wisconsin State Assembly.

== Biography ==
Evans was born on September 17, 1848, in Caernarvon, Wales. In 1853, he settled with his parents in what is now Berlin, Wisconsin. During the American Civil War, Evans served with the 41st Wisconsin Volunteer Infantry Regiment and the 49th Wisconsin Volunteer Infantry Regiment of the Union Army. Afterwards, he joined the Grand Army of the Republic and served in the United States Revenue Cutter Service. Eventually, Evans became a farmer of dairy and other goods. He married the Welsh-born Mary Jane Thomas (1844–1928).

== Political career ==
Evans was elected to the Assembly in a special election in 1899 after the death of William Hughes. He would remain a member through the 1903 session. Previously, Evans was Treasurer of Aurora, Waushara County, Wisconsin from 1875 to 1876 and was elected Chairman (similar to Mayor) of the town board of supervisors (similar to city council) in 1898. He was a Republican. Evans died on January 10, 1929, and is buried in Berlin, Wisconsin.
