= Reinhold Thiessenhusen =

American politician

Reinhold F. Thiessenhusen (November 17, 1864 – May 6, 1930) was an American businessman and politician.

Born in Milwaukee, Wisconsin, Thiessenhusen attended the public schools in Milwaukee. He was a contractor and carpenter. From 1899 to 1906, Thiessenhusen served in the Wisconsin State Assembly as a Republican. He died at his home in Milwaukee, Wisconsin from a heart ailment.
