= John Kessler =

American businessman and politician

John Kessler (December 14, 1847 – June 12, 1917) was an American businessman and politician.

Born in the Kingdom of Bavaria, Kessler emigrated with his parents to the United States, in 1855, and settled in Milwaukee, Wisconsin, Kessler was a cigar maker. He also lived in Green Bay, La Crosse, Oconomowoc, Kenosha, Wisconsin, Chicago, Wisconsin, and Council Bluffs, Iowa. In 1868, Kessler settled in Watertown, Wisconsin. He served as the Watertown City Treasurer. Kessler also served on the Watertown Common Council from 1895 to 1897 and was a Democrat. In 1899, Kessler served in the Wisconsin State Assembly. Kessler died at his home in Watertown, Wisconsin.
