= Robert O. Hunt =

American politician

Robert Ogden Hunt was a member of the Wisconsin State Assembly.

== Biography ==
Hunt was born on June 27, 1873, in Peshtigo (town), Wisconsin. His parents were David and Augusta Hunt.

== Career ==
Hunt was a member of the Assembly during the 1899 session. He was a Republican.
