= Julius Feige =

American politician

Julius Feige (July 10, 1861 – February 24, 1918) was an American businessman and politician.

Feige was born in Milwaukee, Wisconsin and went to Milwaukee parochial and public schools. He was a businessman. Feige served in the Wisconsin Assembly from 1897 to 1901 as a Republican. In 1906, Feige moved to West Allis, Wisconsin where he died.
