= Oscar F. Minch =

American politician

Oscar F. Minch (November 16, 1868 – September 12, 1953) was a member of the Wisconsin State Assembly.

== Biography ==
Minch was born on November 16, 1868, in Paoli, Wisconsin. He attended high school in Madison, Wisconsin, before graduation from what is now the University of Wisconsin-Madison in 1893. Minch earned a living by making baked goods and other confectioneries in Madison before returning to Paoli. He and his family operated the Paoli Mills, now listed on the National Register of Historic Places.

Minch was married to Bertha L. Watt (1875–1918) and Rosalie A. O'Brien (1875–1953). He died in 1953 in Coeur d'Alene, Idaho, and was buried in Spokane, Washington.

== Political career ==
Minch was elected to the Assembly from the 3rd District of Dane County, Wisconsin, in 1896 and 1898. He was a Democrat.
