= Edward J. Dengel =

American politician

Edward J. Dengel (October 6, 1866 – December 9, 1943) was an American politician and businessman.

Born in Milwaukee, Wisconsin, Dengel was in the plumbing, roofing, and wholesale drug businesses. Dengel was involved in the Republican Party. Dengel served in the Wisconsin State Assembly. He died in Milwaukee, Wisconsin.
