= August Gawin =

American politician in Wisconsin

August Gawin was a member of the Wisconsin State Assembly.

== Biography ==
Gawin was born on August 27, 1869, in Posen. He moved with his parents to Milwaukee, Wisconsin, on April 20, 1872. He was the founder of the Columbia Stained Glass Company. Gawin died in West Palm Beach, Florida, on December 8, 1945.

== Career ==
Gawin was elected to the Assembly in 1896. He was a Democrat.
