= Halvor Cleophas =

American politician (1842–1937)

Halvor Cleophas (June 22, 1842 – April 18, 1937) was an American farmer and politician.

Cleophas was born in Hallingdal, Norway. He emigrated with his parents to the United States and settled in the town of Newark, Rock County, Wisconsin in 1843. Cleophas was a farmer. He served as chairman of the Newark Town Board and was a Republican. He served in the Wisconsin Assembly in 1901 and 1902. Cleophas then moved to Beloit, Wisconsin. In 1917, Cleophas moved to Glendale, California. He died from a heart attack at his daughter's house in Glendale, California.
