= Emilus Goodell =

American politician

Emilus S. Goodell (1848–1920) was a Republican member of the Wisconsin State Assembly. He was elected to the Assembly in 1896. Additionally, he was Sheriff, Supervisor and Chairman of the County Board of Vernon County, Wisconsin. Goodell was born on May 3, 1848, in Oswego County, New York.
