= John H. Yorkey =

American politician

John Henry Yorkey (October 4, 1856 - January 30, 1907) was an American politician. He was elected to the Wisconsin State Assembly in 1897.

== Biography ==
Yorkey was born on October 4, 1856, in Ava, New York. He moved to Fredonia, Wisconsin, in 1885.

== Career ==
Yorkey was a member of the Assembly in 1897. He was a Republican.
