= William Hughes (Wisconsin politician) =

American politician

William Hughes (August 11, 1841 – February 4, 1899) was a member of the Wisconsin State Assembly.

Hughes was born in Radnorshire, Wales. In May 1869, he moved to Aurora, Waushara County, Wisconsin. By trade, Hughes was a farmer.

== Political career ==
A Republican, Hughes was Chairman (similar to Mayor) of the town board (similar to city council) of Aurora from 1889 to 1895 and was elected Chairman of the Waushara County, Wisconsin board in 1892 and 1893. Hughes was elected to the Assembly in 1896 and 1898, remaining a member until his death in Madison, Wisconsin. David Evans, Jr. was elected to succeed him in the ensuing special election.
