= Aurora, Waushara County, Wisconsin =

Aurora, Wisconsin
- Town
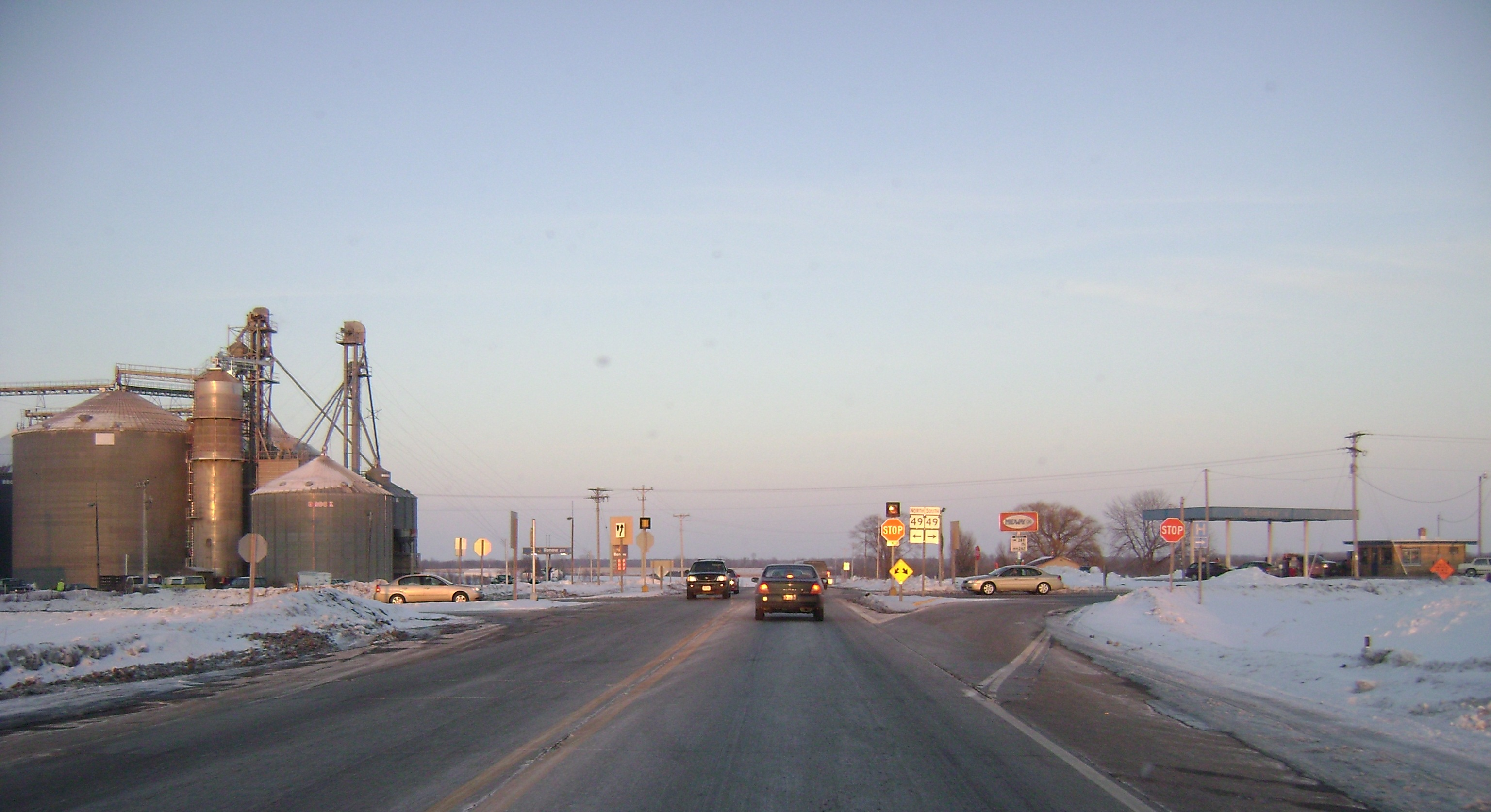
- Intersection of Highways 21 and 49 in Aurora

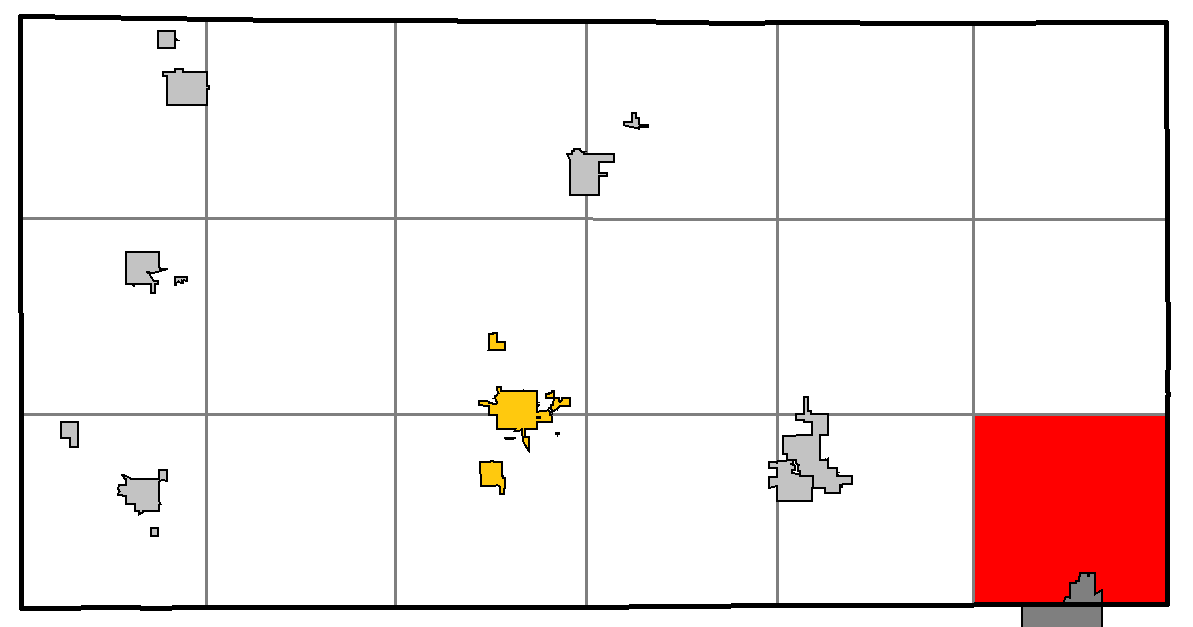
- Location of Aurora, Waushara County, Wisconsin

- Location of Waushara County, Wisconsin
- Coordinates: 44°1′11″N 88°57′18″W
- Country: United States
- State: Wisconsin
- County: Waushara

Area
  - Total: 34.6 sq mi (89.6 km^{2})
  - Land: 34.2 sq mi (88.7 km^{2})
  - Water: 0.39 sq mi (1.0 km^{2})
- Elevation: 771 ft (235 m)

Population (2020)
  - Total: 1,006
  - Density: 29.4/sq mi (11.3/km^{2})
- Time zone: UTC-6 (Central (CST))
  - Summer (DST): UTC-5 (CDT)
- FIPS code: 55-03925
- GNIS feature ID: 1582736
- Website: https://www.townaurora.com/

Aurora is a town in Waushara County, Wisconsin, United States. The population was 1,006 at the 2020 census. The unincorporated community of Auroraville is located in the town, and the city of Berlin is adjacent to the town.

== Geography ==
According to the United States Census Bureau, the town has a total area of 34.6 square miles (89.6 km^{2}), of which 34.2 square miles (88.7 km^{2}) is land and 0.4 square mile (1.0 km^{2}) (1.07%) is water.

== Demographics ==
As of the census of 2000, there were 971 people, 352 households, and 281 families residing in the town. The population density was 28.4 people per square mile (11.0/km^{2}). There were 384 housing units at an average density of 11.2 per square mile (4.3/km^{2}). The racial makeup of the town was 97.63% White, 0.10% Native American, 1.13% Asian, 0.31% from other races, and 0.82% from two or more races. Hispanic or Latino of any race were 1.96% of the population.

There were 352 households, out of which 34.7% had children under the age of 18 living with them, 71.0% were married couples living together, 4.5% had a female householder with no husband present, and 19.9% were non-families. 13.9% of all households were made up of individuals, and 6.5% had someone living alone who was 65 years of age or older. The average household size was 2.76 and the average family size was 3.04.

In the town, the population was spread out, with 26.1% under the age of 18, 6.7% from 18 to 24, 29.4% from 25 to 44, 26.7% from 45 to 64, and 11.2% who were 65 years of age or older. The median age was 38 years. For every 100 females, there were 112.9 males. For every 100 females age 18 and over, there were 108.7 males.

The median income for a household in the town was $49,583, and the median income for a family was $52,500. Males had a median income of $30,509 versus $21,523 for females. The per capita income for the town was $20,147. About 3.8% of families and 4.4% of the population were below the poverty line, including 3.2% of those under age 18 and 6.8% of those age 65 or over.

== Notable people ==
- David Evans, Jr., Wisconsin State Representative
- William Hughes, Wisconsin State Representative
