= Charles Niss =

American politician

Charles C. Niss, Jr. (June 9, 1861 – August 14, 1938) was an American businessman and politician.

Born in Milwaukee, Wisconsin, Niss went to the Milwaukee Public Schools and the commercial college of Milwaukee. Niss was the president and owner of C. Niss & Sons, Inc., a retail furniture firm. His father Charles Niss, Sr. founded the company in 1867. He helped organized the National Retail Furniture Association in 1891 and was the first president of the Wisconsin Retail Furniture Association. Niss served in the Wisconsin State Assembly in 1897 and was a Republican. Niss died suddenly at his home in Milwaukee, Wisconsin.
