= Whitestown, Wisconsin =

- Town
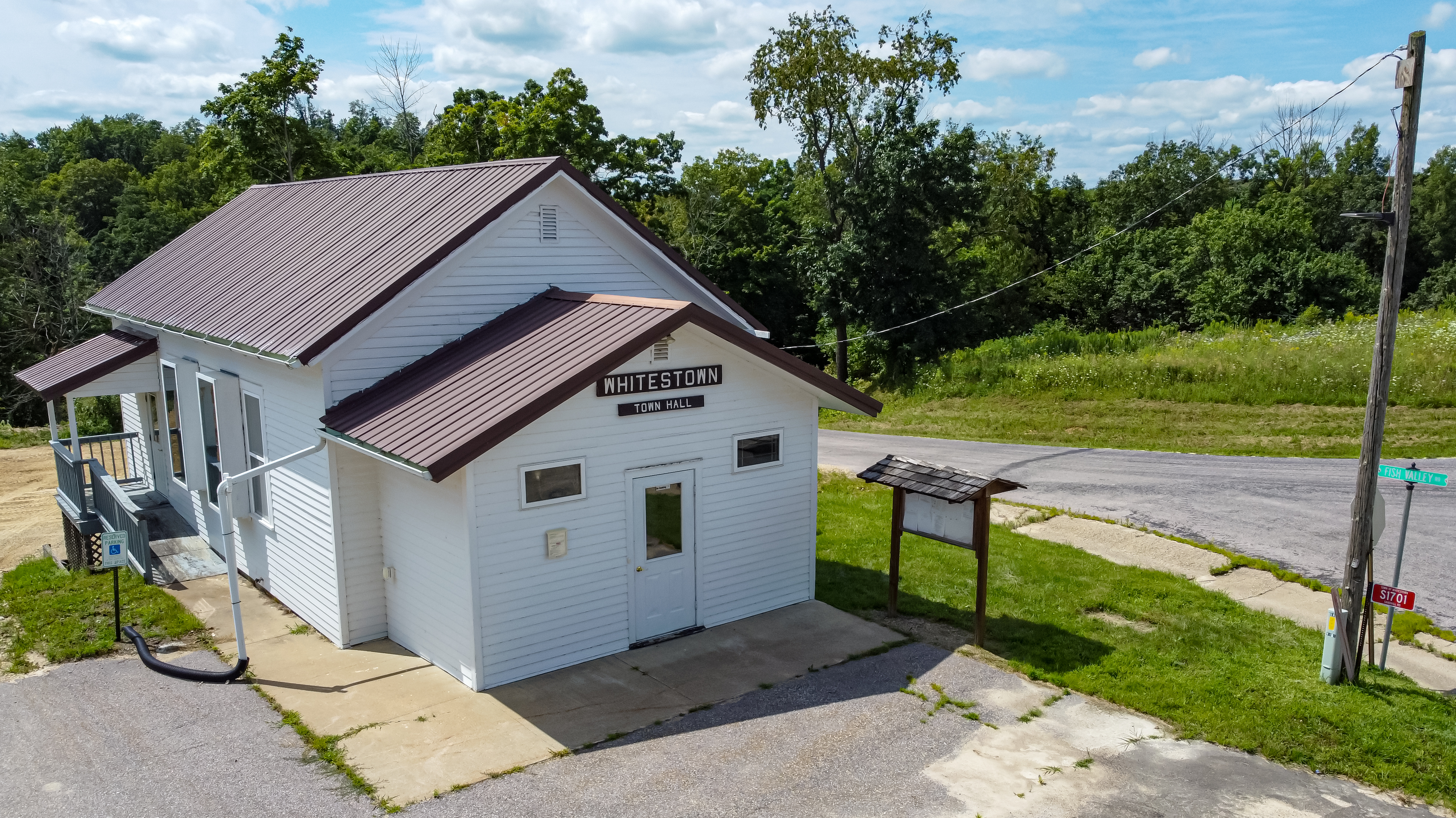
- Town hall

- Location in Vernon County and the state of Wisconsin.
- Coordinates: 43°40′6″N 90°36′32″W
- Country: United States
- State: Wisconsin
- County: Vernon

Area
  - Total: 35.0 sq mi (90.7 km^{2})
  - Land: 35.0 sq mi (90.7 km^{2})
  - Water: 0 sq mi (0.0 km^{2})
- Elevation: 850 ft (260 m)

Population (2020)
  - Total: 623
  - Density: 17.8/sq mi (6.87/km^{2})
- Time zone: UTC-6 (Central (CST))
  - Summer (DST): UTC-5 (CDT)
- Area code: 608
- FIPS code: 55-86900
- GNIS feature ID: 1584431
- Website: https://sites.google.com/view/townofwhitestown/

Whitestown is a town in Vernon County, Wisconsin, United States. The population was 623 at the 2020 census. The unincorporated community of Rockton is located in the town.

== Geography ==
According to the United States Census Bureau, the town has a total area of 35.0 square miles (90.7 km^{2}), all land.

== Demographics ==
At the 2000 census there were 509 people, 167 households, and 122 families in the town. The population density was 14.5 people per square mile (5.6/km^{2}). There were 242 housing units at an average density of 6.9 per square mile (2.7/km^{2}). The racial makeup of the town was 97.45% White, 0.20% Native American, 0.79% Asian, 0.59% from other races, and 0.98% from two or more races. Hispanic or Latino of any race were 0.59%.

Of the 167 households 35.3% had children under the age of 18 living with them, 64.7% were married couples living together, 5.4% had a female householder with no husband present, and 26.9% were non-families. 22.2% of households were one person and 3.0% were one person aged 65 or older. The average household size was 3.04 and the average family size was 3.68.

The age distribution was 35.0% under the age of 18, 7.3% from 18 to 24, 25.5% from 25 to 44, 24.2% from 45 to 64, and 8.1% 65 or older. The median age was 34 years. For every 100 females, there were 105.2 males. For every 100 females age 18 and over, there were 116.3 males.

The median household income was $33,472 and the median family income was $40,750. Males had a median income of $30,278 versus $20,625 for females. The per capita income for the town was $13,289. About 7.1% of families and 11.2% of the population were below the poverty line, including 12.4% of those under age 18 and 14.7% of those age 65 or over.
