= Albert Woller (Republican) =

American politician

Albert Woller (born November 17, 1861) was an insurance agent, real estate agent and Republican politician from Milwaukee who served two terms in the Wisconsin State Assembly from 1895 to 1898.
