= Albert Woyciechowski =

German–American railroad employee and politician

Albert Woyciechowski (April 3, 1868 – February 10, 1899) was a German–American railroad employee and politician.

Born in Lohrens, Germany, he moved to Milwaukee, Wisconsin in 1869. He worked in the railroad business. He served in the Wisconsin State Assembly in 1899 as a Democrat and died while still in office.
