= Montrose, Wisconsin =

Town of Montrose
- Town
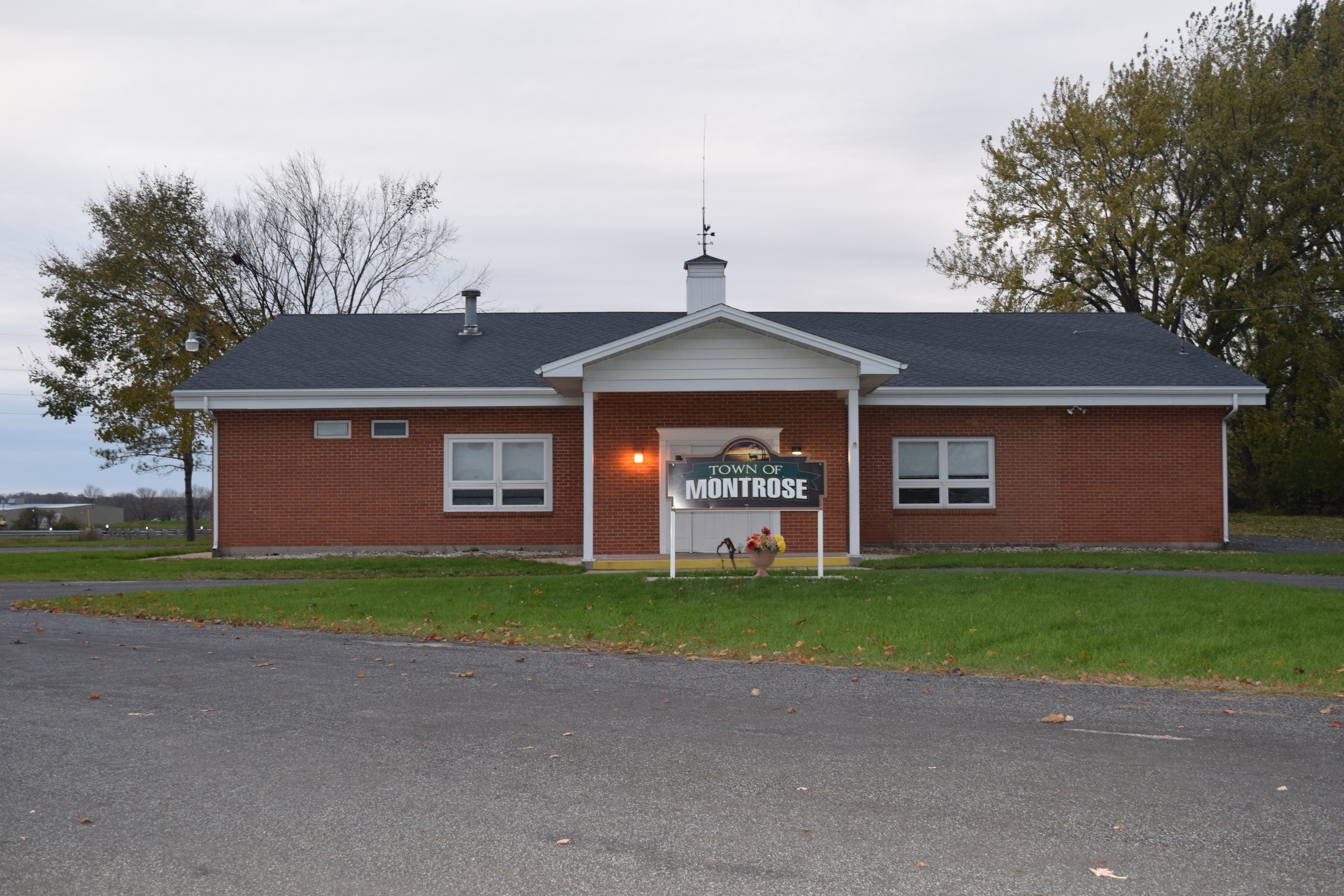
- Montrose town hall

- Location in Dane County and the state of Wisconsin.
- Coordinates: 42°54′6″N 89°32′49″W
- Country: United States
- State: Wisconsin
- County: Dane

Area
  - Total: 34.6 sq mi (89.5 km^{2})
  - Land: 34.3 sq mi (88.9 km^{2})
  - Water: 0.23 sq mi (0.6 km^{2})
- Elevation: 890 ft (270 m)

Population (2020)
  - Total: 1,064
  - Density: 31.0/sq mi (12.0/km^{2})
- Time zone: UTC-6 (Central (CST))
  - Summer (DST): UTC-5 (CDT)
- Area code: 608
- FIPS code: 55-54100
- GNIS feature ID: 1583750

The Town of Montrose is located in Dane County, Wisconsin, United States. The population was 1,064 at the 2020 census. The unincorporated communities of Basco and Paoli are located within the town.

== Geography ==
According to the United States Census Bureau, the town has a total area of 34.5 square miles (89.5 km^{2}), of which 34.3 square miles (88.9 km^{2}) is land and 0.2 square mile (0.6 km^{2}) (0.67%) is water.

== Demographics ==
At the 2000 census there were 1,134 people, 418 households, and 326 families living in the town. The population density was 33.0 people per square mile (12.8/km^{2}). There were 437 housing units at an average density of 12.7 per square mile (4.9/km^{2}). The racial makeup of the town was 98.68% White, 0.09% African American, 0.18% Native American, 0.09% Asian, 0.62% from other races, and 0.35% from two or more races. Hispanic or Latino of any race were 0.26%.

Of the 418 households 35.9% had children under the age of 18 living with them, 68.2% were married couples living together, 4.3% had a female householder with no husband present, and 22.0% were non-families. 17.2% of households were one person and 3.1% were one person aged 65 or older. The average household size was 2.71 and the average family size was 3.06.

The age distribution was 27.3% under the age of 18, 5.1% from 18 to 24, 28.9% from 25 to 44, 29.0% from 45 to 64, and 9.6% 65 or older. The median age was 39 years. For every 100 females, there were 102.9 males. For every 100 females age 18 and over, there were 104.5 males.

The median household income was $59,821 and the median family income was $63,359. Males had a median income of $35,859 versus $30,375 for females. The per capita income for the town was $24,364. About 0.6% of families and 1.6% of the population were below the poverty line, including 2.1% of those under age 18 and 2.0% of those age 65 or over.

== Notable people ==
- John Lyle, Wisconsin State Representative
- Peter W. Matts, Wisconsin State Representative
