= Alfred Cook (Wisconsin politician) =

American politician (1850–1921)

1st Village President of Unity, Wisconsin
- In office May 26, 1906 – January 30, 1921
- Preceded by: Position established

Member of the Wisconsin State Assembly from the Marathon 1st district
- In office January 7, 1901 – January 5, 1903
- Preceded by: Gilbert Vandercook
- Succeeded by: Willis F. La Du

Personal details
- Born: October 4, 1850 Lloydtown, Province of Canada, UK (now Ontario, Canada)
- Died: January 30, 1921 (aged 70) Marshfield, Wisconsin, U.S.
- Resting place: Colby Cemetery, Colby, Wisconsin
- Party: Republican; Democratic (1900 election)
- Spouse: Amanda Melinda Blood (m. 1873–1921)
- Children: Herbert Alfred Cook^{(b. 1874; died 1896)}; George Sewell Cook^{(b. 1875; died 1966)}; Lewis Herman Cook^{(b. 1876; died 1934)}; Henrietta A. (Mason)^{(b. 1878; died 1953)}; Mabel Pearl (Mertz)^{(b. 1881; died 1956)}; Emelyn Isabell (Hirsch)^{(b. 1886; died 1944)}; Walter Edwin Cook^{(b. 1888; died 1955)}; Edith Marion (Tollefson)^{(b. 1890; died 1974)}; Ella Melinda (Glass)^{(b. 1891; died 1928)}; Raymond Donald Cook^{(b. 1893; died 1976)}
- Relatives: Samuel A. Cook (brother)

Alfred Cook (Note: This article was previously titled "Alfred M. Cook" but I found no conclusive evidence for the "M." middle initial, and in fact found multiple conflicting middle initials used over the years including E., J., and C. Without a clear answer, I think it best to use no middle initial -- his grave has no middle, nor does his 1901 Blue Book entry.) (October 4, 1850 – January 30, 1921) was an American farmer, lumber businessman, politician, and pioneer of northern Wisconsin. He was a member of the Wisconsin State Assembly, representing the western half of Marathon County during the 1901–1902 term. He later served as the first village president of Unity, Wisconsin, from 1906 until his death in 1921, and also served 12 years on the Marathon County Board of Supervisors. Politically, Cook was a Republican, but was elected to his one legislative term as a Democrat, due to disapproval of the Republican incumbent Gilbert Vandercook; though after he was sworn in to the Legislature, he largely operated as a member of the Republican caucus.

Alfred Cook was a younger brother of the prominent Winnebago County Republican politician Samuel A. Cook, who served in the U.S. House of Representatives in 1895–1897, and served as mayor of Neenah, Wisconsin. Alfred Cook's sons, Lewis H. Cook and Walter E. Cook, also served in the Wisconsin State Assembly.

== Early life ==
Alfred Cook was born in what is now Lloydtown, Ontario, in October 1850. At the time of his birth, this area was in the Canada West district of the Province of Canada, part of the dominion of the United Kingdom. His parents had come to Canada from Pennsylvania for the opportunity to own their own farm, but decided to return to the United States and settle in the new state of Wisconsin for an opportunity to own a larger farm. Cook's father and elder brother went first to Fond du Lac, Wisconsin, in 1853. Cook later emigrated with the rest of the family in 1855, settling a new farm in the town of Stockbridge, in Calumet County, Wisconsin. Cook attended common schools in Calumet and attended high school in nearby Fond du Lac.

=== Lady Elgin disaster ===
When the Cook family sold their land in Canada in 1855, they deferred the receipt of payment until 1860, and at that time received a lump sum payment of $10,000 in gold, (Note: $10,000 in USD adjusted for inflation to 2026 would be about $403,000. But $10,000 of gold at 1860 gold prices would be about 484 ounces, which would be worth about $2.1 million today.) which would dramatically improve the Cook family's position in their new state. Alfred's mother, sister Elizabeth, and brother Jacob traveled to Canada to collect their payment in August 1860. On their return trip, their ship captain had to bypass landing at Milwaukee due to weather conditions, and brought them instead to Chicago. Fatefully, that evening—September 7, 1860—they boarded the steamship Lady Elgin to return to Milwaukee. Steaming through gale force winds that night, the ship was accidentally rammed by the schooner Augusta of Oswego. The crew of the Augusta believed that the Lady Elgin had survived undamaged, and sped south to Chicago to deal with their own damage. But the Lady Elgin had suffered a large hull breach below the water line, and the ship broke in half within 30 minutes. More than 300 died, including Cook's mother and sister. His brother, Jacob Cook, clung to floating wreckage for fourteen hours before being rescued. The family's gold payment went to the bottom of Lake Michigan with the wreckage.

== Career ==
Cook worked as a farmhand until age 20, when he went to Black River Falls, Wisconsin, to work in the lumber industry. There he met Angus J. McGilvray, and went with him on a large work crew to the area that is now Unity, Wisconsin, on the border between Marathon County and Clark County, Wisconsin. They were hired by Dudley J. Spaulding to cut a road from Loyal, Wisconsin, to the Wisconsin Central Railroad terminus then located at Spencer, Wisconsin, and to then assist in the construction of Spaulding's large sawmill at the area that became the village of Unity. On arriving at the site that is now Unity, they found only two inhabitants and a single log shanty, which served as boarding house for the work crew.

With his wages, Cook purchased forested land in the neighboring town of Brighton; he cut down many of the trees, sold the lumber, and operated a livestock farm on the cleared land.

Throughout the 1880s and 1890s, Cook served several years as chairman of the town of Brighton, often in contest with John W. Salter. In 1884, Cook was appointed deputy sheriff under Marathon County sheriff William Kickbush. Four years later, Cook was the Republican Party nominee for sheriff, but lost the general election to Democrat Mark E. Manson. After the 1888 presidential election, Cook was appointed postmaster at Unity.

=== Train accident and recovery ===
In September 1893, Cook was involved in a severe train collision while riding as a passenger in the caboose of a train near Marshfield, Wisconsin. The shock of impact threw passengers the length of the car, and Cook struck the back of his head on a metal-encased ice block used for cool water supply. He suffered a severe concussion, and at the time, his recovery was described as "doubtful"; the Milwaukee Sentinel actually reported that he had died. He was brought to the Tremont House hotel in Marshfield, where he remained in a delirious and semi-conscious state for several days. After regaining some awareness, he remained totally blind for several more weeks, and frequently lapsed into confused and violent delirium. About a month after the accident, several doctors and specialists consulting on his condition determined that an operation was necessary to relieve the pressure on his brain. His eyesight did not begin to return until late-November, he then traveled to Hot Springs, Arkansas, to recuperate further over the winter of 1893–1894. Cook returned to Wisconsin in January, but never fully recovered from the injury.

=== Legislative service ===
Just a year after suffering his injury, the Republicans of western Marathon County nominated Cook as their candidate for Wisconsin State Assembly in the 1894 election. He lost the general election to Democrat Robert Plisch. In the late 1890s, Cook was part of an unsuccessful movement that advocated for a new "Rivers County" to be created from western Marathon County.

In 1900—despite declaring himself a supporter of progressive Republican Robert M. "Fighting Bob" La Follette—Cook was nominated by the Marathon County Democrats for Wisconsin State Assembly in his district. This was apparently the result of progressive machinations to unseat the incumbent stalwart Republican state representative, Gilbert Vandercook, who was potentially in line to chair the critical redistricting committee in the 1901 term. The initial election results showed Cook had defeated Vandercook by just four votes, but Vandercook chose to contest the election in the state Legislature. In the legal wrangling over the election result, Cook was represented by future Wisconsin chief justice Marvin B. Rosenberry. Republicans—as was common in Wisconsin in this era—held a large Assembly majority; after arriving at the Assembly, Cook caucused with the Republicans and cast his vote for speaker in favor of the Republican George H. Ray. A few weeks later, the Assembly Committee on Privileges and Elections ruled in Cook's favor, allowing him to officially take his the seat on February 6, 1901, and hold the seat for the remainder of the 1901–1902 term.

One of the major issues in the 1901 term was the proposed amendment to the state constitution to ban legislators from accepting free transit passes from railroads. The amendment had passed its first legislative hurdle in the previous term, and had to be passed by both chambers of the legislature again in the 1901 term. Progressive Republicans championed the amendment as part of Robert La Follette's reform agenda, and Democrats largely aligned with the progressives, but the amendment faced stiff opposition from the large conservative Republican faction. Cook was initially non-committal on his position, but ultimately voted for passage of the amendment, which was ratified by voters in 1902. Cook did not purely side with progressives though, and voted consistently with stalwarts on the Hagemeister substitute bill for primary elections (named for Henry F. Hagemeister), in opposition to La Follette's sweeping proposal to abolish nominating conventions.

Cook sought renomination from the Marathon County Democrats in 1902, but he was soundly rejected by the Democratic nominating convention in favor of popular Mosinee businessman Willis F. La Du. La Du went on to win the general election and succeeded Cook in the 46th Legislature.

== Later years ==
The first attempt to incorporate the village of Unity occurred in 1903, but the incorporation was declared invalid after a long legal battle. A new incorporation was conducted in 1906, and Cook was elected the first village president on May 26, 1906. At the same election, his son, Lewis H. Cook, was elected supervisor for the village on the county Board of Supervisors. Alfred Cook ultimately served as village president for the rest of his life.

Cook was in poor health through most of 1920, and went into hospital at the Sacred Heart Sanitarium in Milwaukee. In January, he transferred nearer to home, to St. Joseph's Hospital in Marshfield, where he underwent an operation. He died at the hospital in Marshfield on January 30, 1921.

== Personal life and family ==
Alfred Cook was the tenth or eleventh (Note: Not clear if Alfred or his twin, Albert, were technically "older".) of twelve children born to William P. Cook and his wife Jane (née McGarvy). Alfred had a twin brother, Albert, who moved to Lewiston, Idaho.

Alfred's best known sibling was his elder brother Samuel A. Cook, who enlisted before age 16 with the Union Army during the last year of the American Civil War, then became a prominent Republican politician in Neenah, Wisconsin, serving as mayor, member of the state Assembly, and finally serving in the U.S. House of Representatives. In 1908, he ran as a conservative Republican for U.S. Senate, but lost the primary.

Three other elder brothers also served in the Union Army and returned from the war unharmed.

- Watson Henry Cook (1839–1929) enlisted with the 21st Wisconsin Infantry Regiment and fought in the western theater of the war. He rose through the enlisted ranks and was commissioned a lieutenant in 1864, mustering out at the end of the war as 1st lieutenant of Co. A.
- Jacob Harrison Cook (1841–1917) enlisted immediately at the start of the war with the 5th Wisconsin Infantry Regiment; he saw intense combat in the eastern theater, fighting at Antietam and Gettysburg. He was commissioned a lieutenant in his first year and rose to the rank of captain in Co. I just before Gettysburg; he mustered out as captain of Co. B after the regiment was reorganized. Jacob had been the lone Cook family survivor of the Lady Elgin disaster, and later also became involved in politics with the Republican Party. He ran for mayor of Appleton, Wisconsin, in the same year that Samuel was elected mayor (1889) of the neighboring city, Neenah, but Jacob lost his election.
- James Milton Cook (1845–1936) enlisted in the 2nd Wisconsin Cavalry Regiment and mostly served as part of the escort for general officers in the Missouri and Arkansas theater until the end of combat operations. He and brother Samuel Cook—who also served in the 2nd Wisconsin Cavalry—were then on the post-war expedition with George Armstrong Custer into Texas until late in 1865; he mustered out as a veteran corporal.

Alfred Cook married Amanda Melinda Blood on August 14, 1873, at Stockbridge, Wisconsin. They had 10 children together and were married for 47 years before his death in 1921. All of their children survived to adulthood, but their eldest son, Herbert Alfred Cook, died of Bright's disease at the relatively young age 22, in 1896. Several of their children also went on to notable careers:

- George Sewell Cook (1875–1966) served in the 2nd Wisconsin Infantry Regiment in the Spanish–American War, then went on to serve for fifty years on the Marathon County Board of Supervisors.
- Lewis Herman Cook (sometimes spelled "Louis"; 1876–1934) began a Republican partisan newspaper, then held office as a Marathon County supervisor, county clerk, and then representative in the Wisconsin State Assembly (1921–1923); he was always an active Republican partisan and served the last decade of his life as postmaster at Wausau.
- Walter Edwin Cook (1888–1955) was an auctioneer in Clark County, and served on the village board and school board of Unity, Wisconsin. He was elected to six terms in the Wisconsin State Assembly from Clark County, but died during his sixth term.

== Electoral history ==
=== Wisconsin Assembly (1894) ===
Wisconsin State Assembly, Marathon 1st District Election, 1894
Party	Candidate	Votes	%	±%
General Election, November 6, 1894
Democratic	Robert Plisch	1,744	55.38%	
Republican	Alfred Cook	1,325	42.08%	+5.32pp
Populist	E. Limmer	62	1.97%	
Prohibition	D. R. Olin	18	0.57%	
Plurality		419	13.31%	-13.17pp
Total votes		3,149	100.0%	+12.06%
Democratic hold				

=== Wisconsin Assembly (1900) ===
Wisconsin State Assembly, Marathon 1st District Election, 1900
Party	Candidate	Votes	%	±%
General Election, November 6, 1900
Democratic	Alfred Cook	2,069	50.05%	
Republican	Gilbert Vandercook (incumbent)	2,065	49.95%	−1.48pp
Plurality		4	0.10%	-8.13pp
Total votes		4,134	100.0%	+36.03%
Democratic gain from Republican				

== Notes ==
Wisconsin State Assembly
Preceded by Gilbert Vandercook	Member of the Wisconsin State Assembly from the Marathon 1st district January 7, 1901 – January 5, 1903	Succeeded by Willis F. La Du
