= 1899 United States Senate election in Wisconsin =

- January 25, 1899 – January 31, 1899
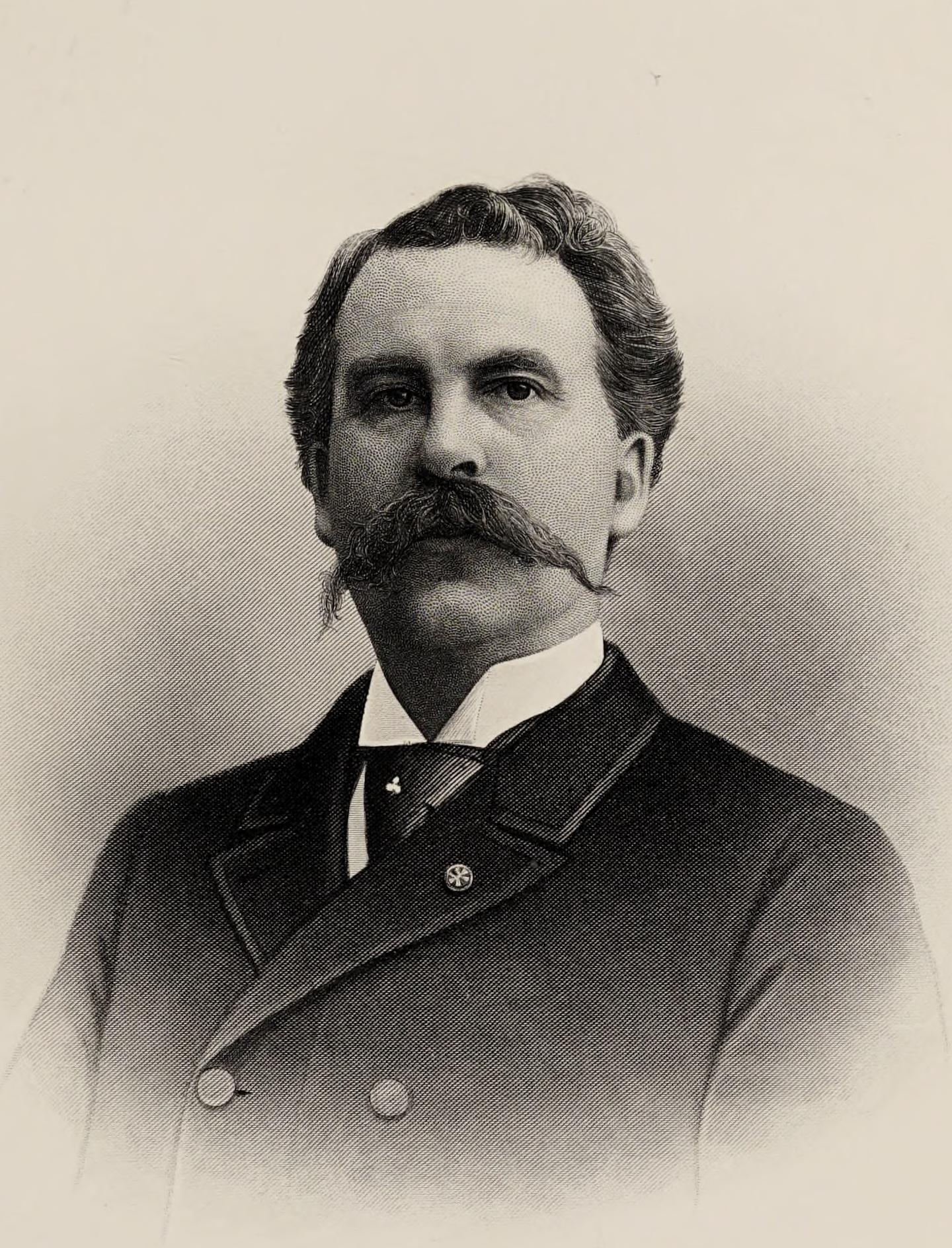

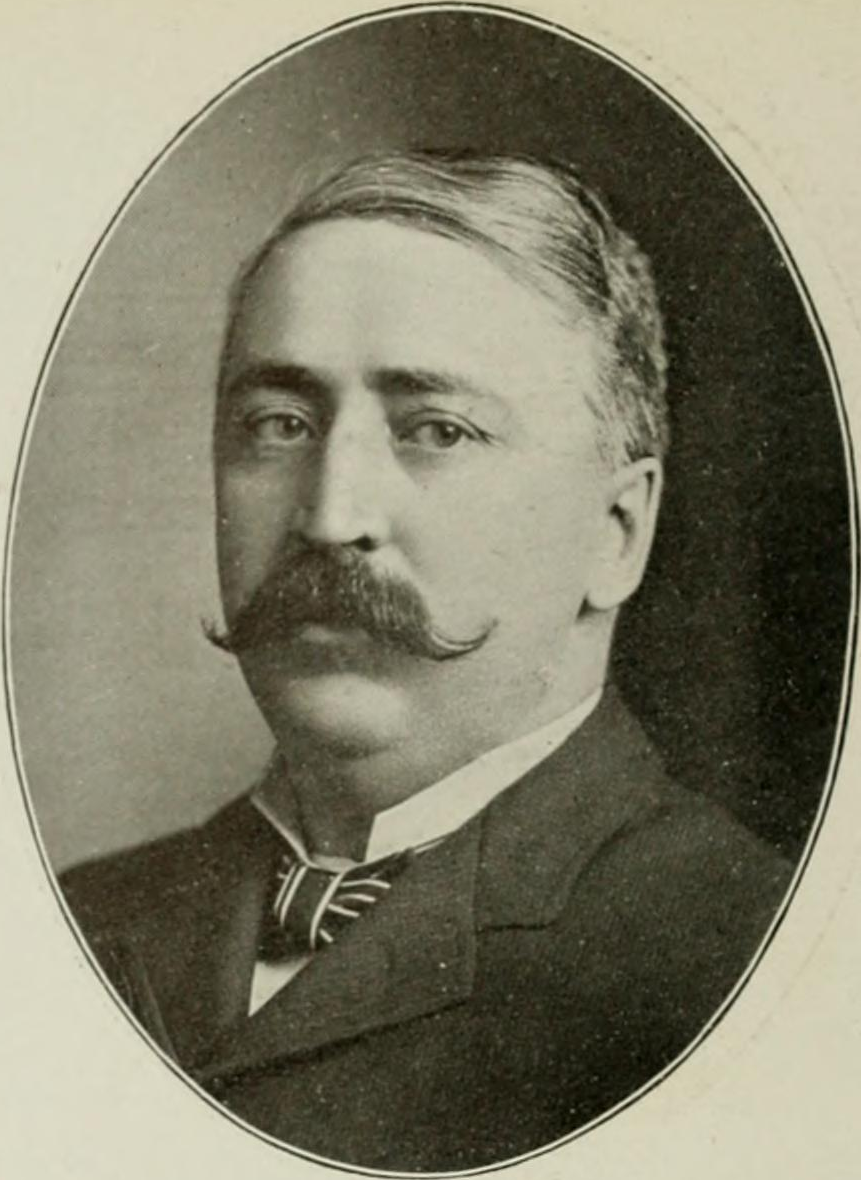
Nominee	Joseph V. Quarles	Timothy E. Ryan
Party	Republican	Democratic
Legislative vote	110	18
Percentage	85.94%	14.06%
U.S. senator before election
John L. Mitchell
Democratic
Elected U.S. Senator
Joseph V. Quarles
Republican

The 1899 United States Senate election in Wisconsin was held in the 44th Wisconsin Legislature between January 25, 1899, and January 31, 1899. Incumbent Democratic U.S. senator John L. Mitchell did not run for a second term. Republican lawyer and former state legislator Joseph V. Quarles was elected to succeed him on the sixth ballot.

In the 1899 term, Republicans held overwhelming majorities in both chambers of the Wisconsin Legislature, so had more than enough votes to elect a Republican United States senator. But an intense five-way contest for the Republican nomination left the caucus unable to select a nominee before the start of the joint convention. After a week of voting in joint convention and 93 ballots in the Republican caucus, Isaac Stephenson, Joseph W. Babcock, Samuel A. Cook, and Charles M. Webb withdrew their candidacies and endorsed Kenosha attorney Joseph V. Quarles.

== Major candidates ==
=== Democratic ===
- Timothy E. Ryan, prominent lawyer and member of the Democratic National Committee from Waukesha, Wisconsin.

=== Republican ===
- Joseph W. Babcock, incumbent U.S. representative of Wisconsin's 3rd congressional district, from Necedah, Wisconsin.
- Samuel A. Cook, former U.S. representative of Wisconsin's 6th congressional district, from Neenah, Wisconsin.
- Joseph V. Quarles, prominent lawyer, former mayor, and former state legislator from Kenosha, Wisconsin.
- Isaac Stephenson, former U.S. representative of Wisconsin's 9th congressional district, from Marinette, Wisconsin.
- Charles M. Webb, Wisconsin circuit court judge and former U.S. attorney from Wisconsin Rapids, Wisconsin.

== Results ==
=== Vote on January 25, 1899 ===
1st Vote of the 44th Wisconsin Legislature, January 25, 1899
Party	Candidate	Votes	%	±%
Republican	Joseph V. Quarles	41	31.78%	
Republican	Isaac Stephenson	26	20.16%	
Democratic	Timothy E. Ryan	19	14.73%	
Republican	Samuel A. Cook	17	13.18%	
Republican	Joseph W. Babcock	16	12.40%	
Republican	Charles M. Webb	10	7.75%	
	Absent or not voting	4		
Majority		65	50.39%	
Total votes		129	96.99%	
Void election result

=== Vote on January 26, 1899 ===
2nd Vote of the 44th Wisconsin Legislature, January 26, 1899
Party	Candidate	Votes	%	±%
Republican	Joseph V. Quarles	41	32.54%	Steady
Republican	Isaac Stephenson	26	20.63%	Steady
Democratic	Timothy E. Ryan	17	13.49%	▼2
Republican	Samuel A. Cook	16	12.70%	▼1
Republican	Joseph W. Babcock	16	12.70%	Steady
Republican	Charles M. Webb	10	7.94%	Steady
	Absent or not voting	7		
Majority		64	50.79%	
Total votes		126	94.74%	▼3
Void election result

=== Vote on January 27, 1899 ===
3rd Vote of the 44th Wisconsin Legislature, January 27, 1899
Party	Candidate	Votes	%	±%
Republican	Joseph V. Quarles	42	33.33%	▲1
Republican	Isaac Stephenson	22	17.46%	▼4
Republican	Samuel A. Cook	20	15.87%	▲4
Republican	Joseph W. Babcock	16	12.70%	Steady
Democratic	Timothy E. Ryan	16	12.70%	▼1
Republican	Charles M. Webb	10	7.94%	Steady
	Absent or not voting	7		
Majority		64	50.79%	
Total votes		126	94.74%	Steady
Void election result

=== Vote on January 28, 1899 ===
A large number were absent on January 28, including nearly all the Democratic legislators.

4th Vote of the 44th Wisconsin Legislature, January 28, 1899
Party	Candidate	Votes	%	±%
Republican	Joseph V. Quarles	39	36.45%	▼3
Republican	Samuel A. Cook	21	19.63%	▲1
Republican	Isaac Stephenson	19	17.76%	▼3
Republican	Joseph W. Babcock	16	14.95%	Steady
Republican	Charles M. Webb	10	9.35%	Steady
Democratic	Timothy E. Ryan	2	1.87%	▼14
	Absent or not voting	26		
Majority		54	50.47%	
Total votes		107	80.45%	▼19
Void election result

=== Vote on January 30, 1899 ===
By law, the legislature was required to convene in joint session each day (except sundays) to vote until they reached a majority for U.S. senator. On January 30, by agreement between the various candidates, most legislators were allowed to be absent, with each declared candidate designating one trusted supporter to arrive and cast a placeholder vote.

5th Vote of the 44th Wisconsin Legislature, January 30, 1899
Party	Candidate	Votes	%	±%
Republican	Joseph W. Babcock	1 (Note: On January 30, Republican representative Gilbert Vandercook was the designated voter for Babcock.)	16.67%	
Republican	Samuel A. Cook	1 (Note: On January 30, Republican representative Thomas McDonald Jr. was the designated voter for Cook.)	16.67%	
Republican	Joseph V. Quarles	1 (Note: On January 30, Republican speaker George H. Ray was the designated voter for Quarles.)	16.67%	
Democratic	Timothy E. Ryan	1 (Note: On January 30, Democratic representative Matthew Killilea was the designated voter for Ryan.)	16.67%	
Republican	Isaac Stephenson	1 (Note: On January 30, Republican representative August Zinn was the designated voter for Stephenson.)	16.67%	
Republican	Charles M. Webb	1 (Note: On January 30, Republican representative Andrew Jensen was the designated voter for Webb.)	16.67%	
	Absent or not voting	127		
Majority		4	66.67%	
Total votes		6	4.51%	
Void election result

=== Vote on January 31, 1899 ===
After the Republican caucus came to consensus the previous evening, the 44th Wisconsin Legislature re-convened in joint session at noon on January 31. Voting went entirely along party lines, with five members absent. Of the members present and voting, Joseph V. Quarles received the votes of all the Republican legislators, winning the election.

6th Vote of the 44th Wisconsin Legislature, January 31, 1899
Party	Candidate	Votes	%	±%
Republican	Joseph V. Quarles	110 (Note: On the 6th ballot, Quarles received the votes of all Republicans except representatives William Hughes and Philo A. Orton (who were absent).)	85.94%	▲71
Democratic	Timothy E. Ryan	18 (Note: On the 6th ballot, Ryan received the votes of all Democrats except senator Michael A. Jacobs and representatives Nicholas E. Becker and Louie Augustus Lange (who were all absent).)	14.06%	▲16
	Absent or not voting	5		
Majority		65	50.78%	
Total votes		128	96.24%	▲21
Republican gain from Democratic				
