= Samuel A. Cook =

American politician (1849–1918)

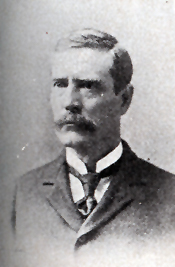

Member of the U.S. House of Representatives from Wisconsin's 6th district
- In office March 4, 1895 – March 3, 1897
- Preceded by: Owen A. Wells
- Succeeded by: James H. Davidson

13th Mayor of Neenah, Wisconsin
- In office April 1889 – April 1890
- Preceded by: William Arnemann
- Succeeded by: George O. Bergstrom

Member of the Wisconsin State Assembly from the Winnebago 2nd district
- In office January 5, 1891 – January 2, 1893
- Preceded by: Walter L. Miller
- Succeeded by: George Danielson

Personal details
- Born: January 28, 1849 York, Province of Canada, UK (now Ontario, Canada)
- Died: April 4, 1918 (aged 69) Neenah, Wisconsin, U.S.
- Resting place: Oak Hill Cemetery, Neenah
- Party: Republican
- Spouses: Abbie F. Kelliher (m. 1873; died 1874); Jennie Christie (m. 1876; died 1895)
- Children: with Abbie Kelliher; infant son^{(b. 1874; died 1874)}; with Jennie Christie; Maud Christie (Lancaster)^{(b. 1878; died 1949)}; Henry Harold Cook^{(b. 1881; died 1931)}
- Relatives: Alfred M. Cook (brother); Lewis H. Cook (nephew); Walter E. Cook (nephew)

Military service
- Allegiance: United States
- Branch/service: United States Volunteers; Union Army
- Years of service: 1865
- Rank: Private
- Unit: 2nd Reg. Wis. Vol. Cavalry
- Battles/wars: American Civil War

Samuel Andrew Cook (January 28, 1849 – April 4, 1918) was an American businessman, Republican politician, and Wisconsin pioneer. He served one term in the U.S. House of Representatives, representing Wisconsin's 6th congressional district during the 54th U.S. Congress (1895–1897). Cook aligned with the conservative or stalwart faction of the Republican Party during the intra-party struggle against the progressive faction in the early 20th century. He was an unsuccessful candidate for United States Senate in the 1908 Republican primary—the first U.S. Senate primary in Wisconsin history—running as a conservative against the incumbent progressive Republican Isaac Stephenson.

Before his election to Congress, he served as the 13th mayor of Neenah, Wisconsin, (1889–1890), and represented northern Winnebago County in the Wisconsin State Assembly during the 1891–1892 term. As a teenager, Cook had served in the Union Army during the American Civil War, and later in life served as commander of the Wisconsin chapter of the Grand Army of the Republic (1915–1916). His name was often abbreviated as S. A. Cook.

His younger brother, Alfred M. Cook, also served in the Wisconsin Legislature, as did Alfred's sons, Lewis H. Cook and Walter E. Cook.

== Early life ==
Samuel A. Cook was born in what is now York, Ontario. At the time of his birth, this area was in the Canada West district of the Province of Canada, part of the dominion of the United Kingdom. His parents had come to Canada from Pennsylvania for the opportunity to own their own farm, but decided to return to the United States and settle in the new state of Wisconsin for an opportunity to own a larger farm. Cook's father and brother went first to Fond du Lac, Wisconsin, in 1853. Cook later emigrated with the rest of the family in 1855, settling a new farm in the town of Stockbridge, in Calumet County, Wisconsin. Cook attended common schools in Calumet and neighboring Fond du Lac County.

=== Lady Elgin disaster ===
When the Cook family sold their land in Canada in 1855, they deferred the receipt of payment until 1860, and at that time received a lump sum payment of $10,000 in gold, (Note: $10,000 in USD adjusted for inflation to 2026 would be about $403,000. But $10,000 of gold at 1860 gold prices would be about 484 ounces, which would be worth about $2.1 million today.) which would dramatically improve the Cook family's position in their new state. Samuel's mother, sister Elizabeth, and brother Jacob traveled to Canada to collect their payment in August 1860. On their return trip, their ship captain had to bypass landing at Milwaukee due to weather conditions, and brought them instead to Chicago. Fatefully, that evening—September 7, 1860—they boarded the steamship Lady Elgin to return to Milwaukee. Steaming through gale force winds that night, the ship was accidentally rammed by the schooner Augusta of Oswego. The crew of the Augusta believed that the Lady Elgin had survived undamaged, and sped south to Chicago to deal with their own damage. But the Lady Elgin had suffered a large hull breach below the water line, and the ship broke in half within 30 minutes. More than 300 died, including Cook's mother and sister. His brother, Jacob Cook, clung to floating wreckage for fourteen hours before being rescued. The family's gold payment went to the bottom of Lake Michigan with the wreckage.

=== Civil War service ===
The outbreak of the American Civil War occurred just a few months after the Lady Elgin disaster. Cook and his brothers were all quite interested in supporting the Union cause. His elder brother, Jacob, joined up immediately with the 5th Wisconsin Infantry Regiment; two other elder brothers, Watson and James, joined the 21st Wisconsin Infantry Regiment and the 2nd Wisconsin Cavalry Regiment, respectively, in 1862. Samuel, only 13 years old in 1862, was impatient to join them; a week before his 16th birthday in 1865, he traveled to Waupun, Wisconsin, to enlist with the 2nd Wisconsin Cavalry, on January 19, 1865. He was assigned to Company A with his brother, James, who was by then a corporal.

Cook joined the regiment at Memphis, Tennessee, where they engaged in scouting duty until April. As the war was winding down after that time, the regiment was assigned to protect civilian lives and property from bandits and returned rebel soldiers. In June, they were sent to Alexandria, Louisiana, where about half the regiment mustered out on July 3. The Cook brothers, with the remainder of the regiment, were assigned to the 2nd Division of Cavalry, Military Division of the Southwest, under General George Armstrong Custer, as part of the Union occupation forces to begin reconstruction. The regiment traveled through Louisiana to Hempstead, Texas, where they camped and engaged in drilling, training, and patrol duty. At the end of October, they proceeded to Austin, Texas, where the regiment was mustered out of federal service. They arrived back in Madison, Wisconsin, on December 11, 1865, where they disbanded.

== Business career ==
For the next five years, Cook worked as a farmhand for his family and neighbors. During that time he continued his studies privately. He made his first foray into business about age 20, when he was hired as a subcontractor for a railroad project. He succeeded, and began working steadily in railroad contracting. Around 1876, Cook moved to the village of Unity, Wisconsin, where he took over contracts to supply wood, ties, and other material for railroad construction. He also built and operated a general store in the village, bringing him additional income. With his growing reputation in Unity, Cook was appointed postmaster and elected treasurer.

While living in Unity, Cook became involved with a business partner to extend his business further along the rail line. That partner ended up taking on a number of debts and then fled town, leaving Cook to pay the costs. Cook's existing businesses managed to compensate for the debt, but he ultimately sold out of the company in 1881. At that time he moved to Neenah, Wisconsin, which became his primary residence for the rest of his life.

Before leaving Unity, Cook had become interested in the logging and lumbering business, and he refocused on that business in Neenah in partnership with Henry Sherry. Through lumber, he and Sherry became invested in the paper business in 1887 as owners of the Neenah Paper Company.

== Political career ==
Cook quickly grew in popularity in Neenah, and made his first foray into active politics with the Republican Party of Wisconsin. In 1888, he accepted the Republican nomination to run for mayor of Neenah, but lost the election to Democrat William Arnemann. Undaunted, Cook ran again the next year and defeated Arnemann by a substantial majority.

He served only one year as mayor and did not run for re-election in 1890. Instead, that fall he accepted the Republican nomination for Wisconsin State Assembly in Winnebago County's 2nd Assembly district. At the time, his district comprised the northern quarter of the county, including Neenah but excluding sister-city Menasha. In an absolutely dreadful election for Wisconsin Republicans, Cook managed to prevail in his district with 54% of the vote and joined the Republican minority in the 40th Wisconsin Legislature. He was one of only two Republican representatives elected from the eastern quarter of the state.

While in the Assembly, Cook was elected as a delegate to the 1892 Republican National Convention. That fall, Cook declined renomination for a second term in the Assembly, but rumors emerged that he would run for U.S. House of Representatives instead. Cook ultimately did not run that year. His legislative duties kept him busy later than normal into the fall, due to two special sessions trying to pass a redistricting law.

Wisconsin's 6th congressional district 1892–1901.

Cook remained active in political and civic affairs after leaving office. He sold his interest in the Neenah Paper Company in 1894; that spring new rumors spread that he would run for Congress, with early endorsements from several newspapers. Cook began accumulating delegates in county conventions that summer, and by the time of the congressional convention had a clear majority and an easy course to the nomination. He was nominated unanimously by the convention on July 20, 1894.

His district was Wisconsin's 6th congressional district, which then comprised his home county, Winnebago, along with Calumet, Manitowoc, Fond du Lac, Marquette, Green Lake, and Waushara. It was one of the more Democratic-friendly districts in the state in that era, but by the 1894 general election, the political mood had turned decisively against the Democrats due to the Panic of 1893. Cook won his election by a 17 point margin, receiving 56% of the vote and defeating incumbent Democrat Owen A. Wells.

Cook was sworn in as a member of the 54th U.S. Congress in March 1895. His first year was troubled when his wife, Jennie, fell ill; her sister had died of tuberculosis in the spring. Cook took his wife to Canada in the fall, hoping that the climate would help her recovery, but she died in September, leaving Cook a widower. Cook did not return to Washington until December. Although Cook was widely expected to win re-election, he announced in July 1896 that he would decline renomination, to devote more time to his children and personal business.

His chief accomplishment in Congress was likely the passage of the Filled Cheese Act, which imposed a heavy tax and new regulations on "filled cheese", a cheese-like product made with margarine or lard rather than milk fat. Though local newspapers also praised his securing several harbor, dam, and bridge appropriations for his district as well.

== Later years ==
Cook largely followed through on his retirement statement, focusing on his family and tending to his business interests. He became the owner and president of the Alexandria Paper Company in Alexandria, Indiana, and a major investor and treasurer of the Wisconsin Northern Railroad.

He did not seek elected office again, but his name was placed in nomination for United States senator in the 1897 election and then again in the 1907 special election. In 1904, Cook attended the Republican state convention opposing the renomination of incumbent governor Robert M. La Follette. After La Follette was renominated, a splinter faction of stalwart Republicans held their own convention and nominated Cook as their candidate for the 1904 gubernatorial election, but the Wisconsin Supreme Court refused to legitimize the convention and, after that decision, Cook refused to allow his name to be used for the ticket. The stalwarts instead named Edward Scofield for their "National Republican" ticket.

The one true political campaign that Cook engaged in during his later years was the 1908 U.S. Senate primary. This was the first primary election for the office of U.S. senator in Wisconsin history, previously the party nominee would be selected by the party's elected state legislators in caucus before they met for the election. Cook was quickly joined in the primary field by former state senator William H. Hatten and Milwaukee district attorney Francis E. McGovern. The incumbent U.S. senator, Isaac Stephenson, was not initially expected to run for re-election; he was nearly 80 years old and had only been elected in a last-minute compromise by the 48th Wisconsin Legislature after a month-long drama and 22 official ballots. Stephenson surprised the field by announcing that he would run for another term in June. Stephenson had been elected in 1907 with the support of the progressive faction, but had fallen out with progressive leader Robert M. La Follette. La Follette ultimately endorsed William Hatten, but was unable to deliver the full support of the progressive faction, as many instead favored McGovern and some remained loyal to Stephenson. On the other hand, Stephenson was also embraced by many stalwarts, splitting the conservative vote with Cook. With both factions divided, Stephenson prevailed with just 31% of the vote; Cook came in second with 26%. The primary didn't end the drama, as Stephenson was subsequently accused of campaign finance violations and the legislature refused to conclude his election until the last possible day.

In 1915, Cook was elected commander of the Wisconsin department of the Grand Army of the Republic, and served a one-year term.

Samuel Cook died at age 69, at his home in Neenah on the morning of April 4, 1918, after a struggle with illness. He was interred at Neenah's Oak Hill Cemetery, alongside his wife.

== Personal life and family ==
Samuel Cook was the ninth of twelve children born to William P. Cook and his wife Jane (née McGarvy). As mentioned above, all three of Samuel's elder brothers served in the Union Army and returned from the war unharmed.

- Watson Henry Cook (1839–1929) enlisted with the 21st Wisconsin Infantry Regiment and fought in the western theater of the war. He rose through the enlisted ranks and was commissioned a lieutenant in 1864, mustering out at the end of the war as 1st lieutenant of Co. A.
- Jacob Harrison Cook (1841–1917) enlisted immediately at the start of the war with the 5th Wisconsin Infantry Regiment; he saw intense combat in the eastern theater, fighting at Antietam and Gettysburg. He was commissioned a lieutenant in his first year and rose to the rank of captain in Co. I just before Gettysburg; he mustered out as captain of Co. B after the regiment was reorganized. Jacob had been the lone Cook family survivor of the Lady Elgin disaster, and later also became involved in politics with the Republican Party. He ran for mayor of Appleton, Wisconsin, in the same year that Samuel was elected mayor (1889) of the neighboring city, Neenah, but Jacob lost his election.
- James Milton Cook (1845–1936) enlisted in the 2nd Wisconsin Cavalry Regiment and mostly served as part of the escort for general officers in the Missouri and Arkansas theater until the end of combat operations. He and Sam were then on the post-war expedition with Custer into Texas until late in 1865. James mustered out as a veteran corporal.

Samuel's younger brother, Alfred M. Cook (1850–1921), was too young to fight in the Civil War, but went on to have his own political career in Marathon County, Wisconsin, serving as a state representative in the 1901–1902 term, and serving as the 1st village president of Unity, Wisconsin.

Samuel Cook married twice. His first wife was Abbie F. Kelliher, who he met in Stockbridge. They married in 1873, but a year later Abbie died after giving birth to their first son. The child died a few weeks later and the two were buried together. Two years later, Cook married Jennie Christie, also of Stockbridge, on May 17, 1876. They had two children together and were married for 19 years before her sudden death from tuberculosis in September 1895, during Cook's first year in Congress.

- Their daughter, Maud Christie Cook, married successful investment broker Charles F. Lancaster of Boston.
- Their son, Henry Harold "Harry" Cook, went into the paper industry in Indiana.

== Electoral history ==
=== Neenah mayor (1888, 1889) ===
Year	Election	Date	Elected				Defeated				Total	Plurality
1888	General	Apr. 3	William Arnemann	Democratic	476	54.34%	Samuel A. Cook	Rep.	396	45.21%	876	80
1888	General	Apr. 3	William Arnemann	Democratic	476	54.34%	F. F. Kellogg	Proh.	4	0.46%	876	80
1889	General	Apr. 2	Samuel A. Cook	Republican	631	64.85%	William Arnemann (inc)	Dem.	342	35.15%	973	619

=== Wisconsin Assembly (1890) ===
Year	Election	Date	Elected				Defeated				Total	Plurality
1890	General	Nov. 4	Samuel A. Cook	Republican	1,326	54.55%	John W. Tobey	Dem.	1,042	42.86%	2,431	284
1890	General	Nov. 4	Samuel A. Cook	Republican	1,326	54.55%	Lucius Webster	Proh.	63	2.59%	2,431	284

=== U.S. House (1894) ===
Year	Election	Date	Elected				Defeated				Total	Plurality
1894	General	Nov. 6	Samuel A. Cook	Republican	21,718	55.75%	Owen A. Wells (inc)	Dem.	14,919	38.30%	38,956	6,799
1894	General	Nov. 6	Samuel A. Cook	Republican	21,718	55.75%	Riley S. Bishop	Peo.	1,341	3.44%	38,956	6,799
1894	General	Nov. 6	Samuel A. Cook	Republican	21,718	55.75%	Byron Van Keuren	Proh.	977	2.51%	38,956	6,799

=== U.S. Senate (1908) ===
United States Senate Election in Wisconsin, 1908–1909
Party	Candidate	Votes	%
Republican Primary, September 1, 1908
Republican	Isaac Stephenson (incumbent)	56,839	31.04%
Republican	Samuel A. Cook	47,944	26.19%
Republican	Francis E. McGovern	42,631	23.28%
Republican	William H. Hatten	35,621	19.46%
	Scattering	54	0.58%
Plurality		8,895	4.86%
Total votes		183,089	100.0%

== Notes ==
U.S. House of Representatives
Preceded by Owen A. Wells	Member of the U.S. House of Representatives from Wisconsin's 6th congressional district March 4, 1895 - March 3, 1897	Succeeded by James H. Davidson
