= Arnemann =

Arnemann is a surname. Notable people with the surname include:

- Raul Arnemann (born 1953), Estonian rower
- William Arnemann (1850–1917), German-born American businessman and politician
