= Thomas David Morrison =

19th-century Upper Canada politician and doctor

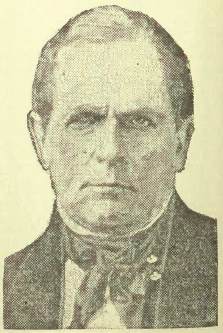

3rd Mayor of Toronto
- In office 1836
- Preceded by: Robert Baldwin Sullivan
- Succeeded by: George Gurnett

Member of the Legislative Assembly of Upper Canada for 3rd York
- In office 1835–1840

Personal details
- Born: c. 1796 Quebec City, Lower Canada
- Died: March 19, 1856 (aged 60) Toronto, Canada West

Thomas David Morrison (c. 1796 – March 19, 1856) was a medical doctor and political figure in Upper Canada. He was born in Quebec City around 1796 and worked as a clerk in the medical department of the British Army during the War of 1812. He studied medicine in the United States and returned to York in 1824 to become a doctor in Upper Canada. He treated patients and served on the Toronto Board of Health during the 1832 and 1834 cholera outbreaks and co-founded the York Dispensary. In 1834 he was elected to the 12th Parliament of Upper Canada, representing the third riding of York County as part of the reform movement. That same year he was elected as an alderman to the Toronto City Council and reelected the subsequent two years. In 1836, he served a term as mayor of Toronto.

Morrison had been an early supporter of the reform movement in Upper Canada and participated in meetings to encourage political change. He spoke repeatedly against armed rebellion and encouraged William Lyon Mackenzie to continue soliciting support for his reforms. He did not participate in the Upper Canada Rebellion and remained in his home instead. Nevertheless, he was arrested and charged with treason for planning and executing the rebellion and found not guilty at a subsequent trial. Fearing additional charges, Morrison fled to the United States and resumed practicing medicine. When amnesty was granted to most participants of the rebellion in 1843, he returned to Toronto to continue his medical practice and serve on various boards of medicine. He died on March 19, 1856, of palsy in Toronto.

== Early life ==
Thomas David Morrison was born c. 1796 in Quebec City. His father was William Morrison, a senior clerk with the Royal Engineers. He came to York, Upper Canada, before 1816 and two years later he married Effie Gilbert, née Patrick. Morrison was originally an Anglican and served on the board of the Upper Canada Bible Society. In 1818, Morrison helped organise the creation of the first Methodist church in York.

== Career pre-rebellion ==
=== Clerkship and early medical career ===
From 1812 to 1814, Morrison worked with the British Army as a clerk of acquisitions in the medical department during the War of 1812. In 1816, he was hired as a clerk in York for the office of the surveyor-general. He was fired from his clerkship in 1822 for "uttering languages" and "opinions very unbecoming a person employed in one of His Majesty's public offices". However, he might have been dismissed because he converted to Methodism in 1818 and Upper Canadian government officials thought he deviated from proper Anglican values. After his dismissal, Morrison went to the United States to study medicine. He returned to York and on June 5, 1824, and was licensed to practice medicine in "Physic, Surgery and Midwifery". Morrison opened his practice in York but also travelled north into the country to care for people.

=== Provincial politics ===
In 1828 Morrison ran for the Legislative Assembly of Upper Canada for the constituency of the 3rd riding of York. He ran on a reform platform supported by William Lyon Mackenzie, which opposed the firing of Judge John Walpole Willis by Lieutenant Governor Peregrine Maitland from the Court of King's Bench. He lost the election to John Robinson by 17 votes and unsuccessfully challenged the results. After the election, Morrison helped organise a committee to petition British politicians to intervene in Upper Canada to protect the constitution. Members of this committee were against Maitland's dismissal of Willis. On August 22, 1832, he opened the York Dispensary with William Warren Baldwin and John E. Tims, but it closed a year later because of a lack of funding.

In 1832 Solicitor-General Christopher Alexander Hagerman expelled Mackenzie from the Legislative Assembly of Upper Canada. Morrison organised a meeting on January 19 to demand the lieutenant-governor call an election to enable Hagerman and others to campaign and explain their actions to voters in Upper Canada. Mackenzie was in England during the subsequent by-election for his Legislative Assembly seat, so Morrison spoke on his behalf at the poll and encouraged others to join his recently created Upper Canada Central Political Union. Morrison proposed the organisational structure of the union and was elected its corresponding secretary. In 1834 Morrison was selected again as the reform movement's candidate for the Legislative Assembly of Upper Canada in the 3rd riding of York. Morrison won his seat and was reelected in 1836. On November 4, 1835, he was elected as a director for the newly created Bank of the People, created to stop the monopoly of the Bank of Upper Canada.

=== Municipal politics ===
Morrison was elected alderman for St. Andrew's Ward in Toronto's 1834 city council election and was re-elected to this position in 1835 and 1836. Anticipating a cholera outbreak in Toronto, as a doctor, Morrison was appointed to a reconsecrated Cholera Hospital in 1834. The outbreak was declared later that year while Morrison was a member of the Toronto Board of Health. Morrison quarrelled with Tory members over accusations that Mackenzie, the city's mayor, was interfering with the work of health officers. Morrison was removed from the board when it was restructured two weeks after the outbreak's declaration. Tory newspapers speculated of an argument between Mackenzie and Morrison over the lieutenant governor's offer to fund the Cholera Hospital. Mackenzie explained in his newspaper that Morrison did not want to apply for more funding to the hospital and consequently resigned from the board. In 1836, the lieutenant-governor appointed Morrison to the Medical Board of Upper Canada.

In 1836 he was chosen as mayor of Toronto. His mayoralty focused on the conflict between Reformers and Tories in the provincial legislature, but his term was also credited with new infrastructure projects to improve the city's water supply and an increased number of gas-powered street lamps. His council also approved funding to pave major roads with macadam and created a House of Industry, which allowed for the creation of workhouses the following year. He chose not to run for city council in the subsequent municipal election.

== Upper Canada Rebellion ==
Morrison was a member of the reform movement and regularly attended their meetings in the 1830s. He hesitated before signing the movement's reform declaration in July 1837 but was appointed to their Central Vigilance Committee. When Mackenzie suggested a revolt in October 1837, Morrison reportedly exclaimed, "This is treason; if you think to entrap me into any such mad scheme, you will find I am not your man." Witnesses at the meeting stated that Morrison spoke against rebellion and threatened to leave if consideration was continued. After the meeting Rolph, Mackenzie and Morrison agreed to send Jesse Lloyd to Lower Canada to meet with the patriotes. Lloyd returned with a letter from Thomas Storrow Brown, a patriote leader, allegedly asking Upper Canada radicals to begin their rebellion to draw troops away from Lower Canada. Morrison was not convinced of this interpretation of the letter and spoke against taking any action. The three men agreed Mackenzie would tour local communities to solicit support for their cause. Morrison gave Mackenzie permission to tell communities he supported the rebellion, but insisted Mackenzie could not commit to or start any action during the tour.

Mackenzie returned to York in the third week of November with a plan to start an armed rebellion on December 7. Morrison was concerned that Mackenzie was being reckless creating plans for the rebellion without consulting him and protested against the amount of authority Mackenzie was giving himself. Morrison and Rolph insisted Mackenzie convince people with military expertise to help lead the rebellion, and Mackenzie promised to recruit Anthony Van Egmond who had combat experience.

During the Upper Canada Rebellion, Morrison remained in his home. On December 6 Morrison and Rolph sent a message to Montgomery's Tavern encouraging Mackenzie to disperse the men assembled there. Mackenzie ignored the letter.

=== Trial ===
A loyalist militia arrested Morrison on December 6 for participating in the Upper Canada Rebellion and held without bail until his trial in April 1838. He appeared before a government committee investigating the revolt to proclaim his innocence and deny knowledge or participation in the rebellion. The scaffold used to hang previous participants of the rebellion was dismantled two days before Morrison's trial. This could have been a sign of leniency from the government, or a signal to Morrison's jury that a guilty verdict would not result in Morrison's execution, thus making them more likely to convict him.

The trial took place on April 25, 1838, and began at 10 am. Jonas Jones was the judge because the chief justice, John Robinson, ran against Morrison in the 1828 election for the legislature. Hagerman was the prosecutor and Robert Baldwin was Morrison's defence counsel. Morrison was charged with levying and the Crown called three witnesses who claimed to have seen Morrison on Yonge Street with Mackenzie on the night of the rebellion. The Crown admitted in their opening arguments that the witnesses might be mistaken. One witness stated he saw Morrison wearing glasses, but Morrison's defence attorney argued that Morrison often wore sunglasses during the day but would not have worn them at night. Fifteen witnesses also testified that Morrison was not on Yonge Street during the rebellion.

The Crown brought a second charge of conspiring to form a rebellion and brought forward evidence of his signature on the reform declaration in July 1837. Hagerman struggled to explain why Morrison was not charged when the declaration was originally published, stating that the rebellion showed the true, violent intention of the declaration. The defence counsel stated that the declaration was a call to create a convention to discuss colonial independence from Britain and that politicians in England, including former Prime Minister Robert Peel, were able to promote colonial independence without being charged with treason. The Crown also brought evidence that Morrison was at the October meeting where Mackenzie proposed the rebellion, but witnesses to the meeting testified Morrison was against this proposal when Mackenzie proposed it. Morrison's defence counsel also claimed that the reform declaration could be calling for a convention to discuss political independence from Britain, and prominent politicians in Britain were calling for colonies to be more independent without being arrested for advancing this idea. The defence counsel also challenged the idea that the declaration could call for the death of the monarch if the king was not physically present in the city.

The trial ended at 2 am the next day and the jury deliberated for eight hours before rendering a verdict. Half an hour into their deliberations, the jury inquired about finding Morrison guilty of a crime less serious than high treason, but they were informed that they could not. The jury acquitted Morrison of the crimes brought forward at trial. The trial's audience applauded loudly upon hearing the verdict.

== Post-rebellion life and death ==
Morrison was afraid of being charged again for planning the rebellion because the jury at his trial had inquired into convicting him of a lesser crime. He fled to Rochester to join Rolph before settling in Batavia, New York, and returning to his career as a doctor. In 1839 the legislature expelled him for leaving the country. In 1843 the Canadian government declared an amnesty for almost everyone involved in the rebellion and Morrison returned to Toronto to practice medicine. He also served on multiple hospital boards, lectured at the Toronto School of Medicine, and in 1851 served another term on the Medical Board of Upper Canada.

Morrison died on March 19, 1856, of palsy in Toronto at his home on Adelaide Street.

== Works cited ==
- Armstrong, Frederick Henry (1985). Handbook of Upper Canadian chronology. Toronto: Dundurn Press. ISBN 978-1-55488-183-3.
- Barnard, Stuart Wayne (2016). Religious Print Culture and the British and Foreign Bible Society in Canada, 1820–1904 (Thesis). University of Calgary. doi:10.11575/PRISM/27618.
- Bilson, Geoffrey (1980). A darkened house : cholera in nineteenth-century Canada. Toronto: University of Toronto Press. ISBN 978-0-8020-2367-4.
- Canniff, William (1894). The Medical Profession in Upper Canada, 1783–1850: An Historical Narrative, with Original Documents Relating to the Profession, Including Some Brief Biographies. Toronto: W. Briggs.
- Careless, James Maurice Stockford (1984). Toronto to 1918: an illustrated history. Toronto: J. Lorimer & Co. ISBN 978-0-88862-665-3.
- Read, Colin; Stagg, Ronald John, eds. (1985). Rebellion of 1837 in Upper Canada. McGill-Queen's Press – MQUP. ISBN 978-0-88629-026-9.
- Cross, Michael S. (2012). A biography of Robert Baldwin : the morning-star of memory. Don Mills, Ontario: Oxford University Press. ISBN 978-0-19-544954-9.
- Johnson, J. K. (1989). Becoming prominent : regional leadership in Upper Canada, 1791-1841. Kingston, Ont.: McGill-Queen's University Press. ISBN 978-0-7735-6157-1. OCLC 243584870.
- Osgoode Society for Canadian Legal History (1996). Canadian State Trials: Rebellion and invasion in the Canadas, 1837-1839. Toronto: University of Toronto Press. ISBN 978-0-8020-3748-0.
- Romney, Paul (1975). "William Lyon Mackenzie as Mayor of Toronto". Canadian Historical Review. 56 (4): 416–436. doi:10.3138/CHR-056-04-02. ISSN 0008-3755. S2CID 153806576 – via Project MUSE.
- Romney, Paul; Wright, Barry (2002). "The Toronto Treason Trials, March–May 1838". Canadian State Trials: Volume Two: Rebellion and Invasion in the Canadas, 1837–1839. Vol. 2. University of Toronto Press. ISBN 978-1-4426-5767-0. JSTOR 10.3138/j.ctt130jwwk.
- Russell, Victor Loring (1982). Mayors of Toronto. Erin, Ontario: Boston Mills Press. ISBN 978-0-919822-77-1.
- Schrauwers, Albert (2007). "A farmer's alliance: the joint stock companies of the Home District and the economic roots of deliberative democracy in Upper Canada". Ontario History. 99 (2). doi:10.7202/1065739ar. ISSN 0030-2953 – via Gale Academic OneFile.
- Schrauwers, Albert (2009). Union is Strength: W.L. Mackenzie, the Children of Peace and the Emergence of Joint Stock Democracy in Upper Canada. Toronto: University of Toronto Press. ISBN 978-0-8020-9927-3.
- Wallace, William Stewart (1915). The family compact; a chronicle of the rebellion in Upper Canada. Toronto: Toronto : Glasgow, Brook & Company.
- Wilton, Carol (2000). Popular Politics and Political Culture in Upper Canada, 1800–1850. Montreal & Kingston: McGill-Queen's Press – MQUP. ISBN 978-0-7735-2054-7.
