= Evergreen, Wisconsin =

Evergreen is the name of locations in the U.S. state of Wisconsin:

- Evergreen, Langlade County, Wisconsin
- Evergreen, Marathon County, Wisconsin
- Evergreen, Washburn County, Wisconsin
