= Alfred Cook =

Alfred Cook may refer to:

- Alfred Bramwell Cook (1903–1994), New Zealand Salvation Army leader and doctor
- Alfred Cook (Wisconsin politician) (1850–1921), American farmer, businessman, and politician in Wisconsin
