= 2nd Wisconsin Infantry Regiment (1898) =

U.S. Volunteer infantry regiment

- Flag of Wisconsin
- Active: May 12, 1898 – November 21, 1898
- Country: United States
- Branch: Infantry
- Size: Regiment
- Engagements: Spanish–American War: Puerto Rico campaign

Commanders
- Colonel: Charles A. Born

The 2nd Wisconsin Infantry Regiment, reconstituted in 1898, was as an infantry regiment that served in the United States Army during the Spanish–American War. The regiment served in the Puerto Rico campaign.

== Service ==
The 2nd Wisconsin Infantry was mustered into service on May 12, 1898, at Camp Harvey in Milwaukee, Wisconsin, with a strength of 49 officers and 972 enlisted men.

They proceeded to Camp Thomas, near the old Chickamauga battlefield in Tennessee, to prepare for battle in the Caribbean. The regiment was stricken by an outbreak of Typhoid fever. They were sent to South Carolina to prepare for the invasion of Cuba, but were delayed due to logistical problems and missed the Cuba campaign. Instead, in July 1898, they joined the Puerto Rico campaign. They occupied the cities of Ponce and Coamo, and engaged in skirmishing in that area until the cessation of hostilities in August.

The 2nd Wisconsin Infantry returned to Wisconsin in September and was mustered out of service on November 21, 1898. At the time of mustering out, the unit consisted of 48 officers and 1,248 enlisted men.

== Casualties ==
The 2nd Wisconsin Infantry suffered 39 enlisted men who died of disease, plus 5 additional men who were discharged for disability, court martial, or other causes, and 1 desertion.

== Commanders ==
- Colonel Charles A. Born

== Notable people ==
- George Sewell Cook, the son of Alfred Cook and nephew of Samuel A. Cook, served as a private in Co. A. He later served 50 years on the Marathon County Board of Supervisors.
- Norman Knudson was first lieutenant of Co. H. He later served as a Wisconsin state senator.
- Albert Solliday was lieutenant colonel of the regiment. He had previously served in the 114th Ohio Infantry Regiment during the American Civil War. Between the wars, he served as the 24th mayor of Watertown, Wisconsin, and was a Wisconsin state senator. After the war he was appointed quartermaster and commissary general for the Wisconsin National Guard.

== See also ==
- 2nd Wisconsin Infantry Regiment
