= Kronenwetter, Wisconsin =

- Village
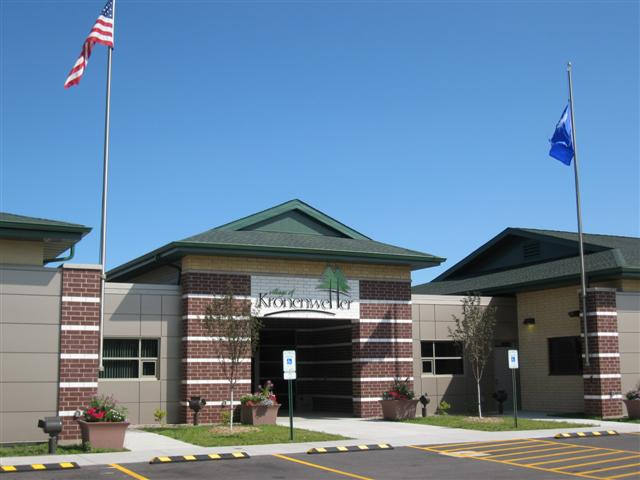
- Kronenwetter Municipal Center
- Motto: "Come Grow With Us"
- Location of Kronenwetter in Marathon County, Wisconsin.
- Coordinates: 44°50′20″N 89°37′36″W
- Country: United States
- State: Wisconsin
- County: Marathon
- Incorporation: 2002

Government
  - Type: Board of Trustees
  - President: Chris Voll
  - Village Administrator: Richard Downey

Area
  - Total: 51.97 sq mi (134.61 km^{2})
  - Land: 51.61 sq mi (133.66 km^{2})
  - Water: 0.37 sq mi (0.95 km^{2})
- Elevation: 1,198 ft (365 m)

Population (2020)
  - Total: 8,353
  - Density: 156.5/sq mi (60.44/km^{2})
- Time zone: UTC-6 (Central (CST))
  - Summer (DST): UTC-5 (CDT)
- ZIP code: 54455
- Area codes: 715 & 534
- FIPS code: 55-40550
- GNIS feature ID: 1583496
- Website: www.kronenwetter.org

Kronenwetter is a village in Marathon County, Wisconsin, United States. As of the 2020 census, the population was 8,353. It is the largest village by land area (although Suamico is larger when its water area is added) in Wisconsin, and the third-largest community by population in Marathon County. It is part of the Wausau metropolitan statistical area.

The residential community of Evergreen is located in the village. The former unincorporated community of Peplin was also located in the town of Kronenwetter before its incorporation into a village.

== History ==
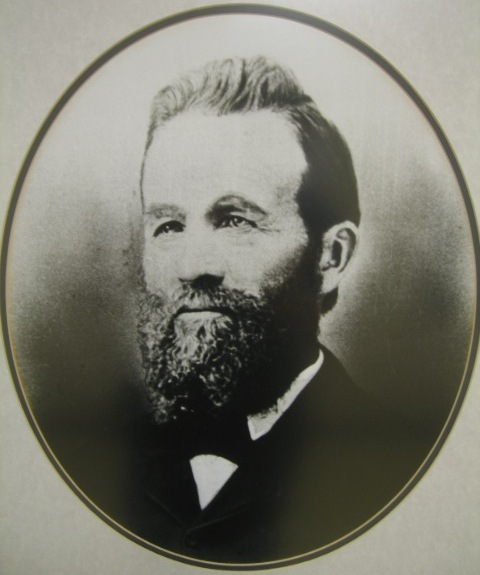
Founder Sebastian Kronenwetter

Prior to the formation of the town of Kronenwetter, the area was composed of several small settlements. Around 1855, a Native American named Keeler dug a canal, rerouting the Bull Jr. Creek over a drop to power a small sawmill he built. Other buildings were built, and the area became known as Keelerville. In 1857, Sebastian Kronenwetter moved to the area and purchased the Keelerville sawmill, making it quite successful. In the years to follow, Kronenwetter continued his success, owning a hotel and building a sawmill in what is now the city of Mosinee. In 1885, he was elected to the Wisconsin State Assembly.

On November 11, 1886, the eastern section of the town of Mosinee was formed into a new town known as Kronenwetter. In 1902, Sebastian Kronenwetter died and was buried in the Mosinee cemetery.

Kronenwetter expanded around 1910 when the Worzella brothers purchased 26,000 acres (110 km^{2}) of land and built the Polish community of Peplin near the intersection of County Highway X and East State Highway 153. The brothers constructed a sawmill, store, office, blacksmith shop, and living quarters for the workers. To advertise their new community, the brothers printed brochures describing the area in Polish and sent them to major cities in the United States. They also put advertisements in Polish-language newspapers in those cities. To entice the Polish people to come, the brochures included pictures of beautiful farms, including buildings and livestock. Among the first to arrive were Vince Ruzga, Albert Wonsil and Alex Dyda. The Worzella brothers built homes for the settlers starting from $350 for a three-room house and $450 for a five-room house. The sawmill eventually was shut down, but others were built in the area and were supported by the community, as the lumber was needed for homes. The sawmills ceased operation in 1930. During those years, schools were built throughout the town and population expanded.

In the election of November 5, 2002, the residents chose by a referendum to create the Village of Kronenwetter from most of the town; this became effective on November 20. The first village board of trustees was sworn into office on January 13, 2003. On February 24, 2003, the village annexed the remainder of the town, dissolving the town as a legal entity.

Residents of Kronenwetter use the postal zip code of 54455 for the nearby city of Mosinee, though Kronenwetter has a larger population than Mosinee. In the spring of 2010, residents were surveyed by the US Postal Service to see whether residents would like to be able to use "Kronenwetter, WI 54455" as a valid address, and a majority of residents voted yes. The joint 54455 zip code went into effect in mid-2010.

== Geography ==
According to the United States Census Bureau, the village has a total area of 52.06 square miles (134.83 km^{2}), of which 51.70 square miles (133.90 km^{2}) is land and 0.36 square miles (0.93 km^{2}) is water. This makes the village of Kronenwetter the largest village in Wisconsin.

== Demographics ==
Historical population
Census	Pop.	Note	%±
2010	7,210		—
2020	8,353		15.9%
U.S. Decennial Census

In the 2000 census, separate reports were prepared for the most densely populated section or district. These are reported as the Evergreen census-designated place, but are also included in the aggregate numbers given here.

=== 2010 census ===
As of the census of 2010, there were 7,210 people, 2,652 households, and 2,069 families residing in the village. The population density was 139.5 inhabitants per square mile (53.9/km^{2}). There were 2,810 housing units at an average density of 54.4 per square mile (21.0/km^{2}). The racial makeup of the village was 94.5% White, 0.3% African American, 0.3% Native American, 3.7% Asian, 0.5% from other races, and 0.7% from two or more races. Hispanic or Latino of any race were 1.4% of the population.

There were 2,652 households, of which 38.4% had children under the age of 18 living with them, 65.9% were married couples living together, 7.1% had a female householder with no husband present, 5.0% had a male householder with no wife present, and 22.0% were non-families. 15.8% of all households were made up of individuals, and 4.8% had someone living alone who was 65 years of age or older. The average household size was 2.71 and the average family size was 3.03.

The median age in the village was 37.3 years. 26.9% of residents were under the age of 18; 7% were between the ages of 18 and 24; 28.3% were from 25 to 44; 27.6% were from 45 to 64; and 10.2% were 65 years of age or older. The gender makeup of the village was 50.4% male and 49.6% female.

=== 2000 census ===
As of the census of 2000, there were 5,369 people, 1,953 households, and 1,537 families residing in the town. The population density was 103.4 people per square mile (39.9/km^{2}). There were 1,953 housing units at an average density of 37.6 per square mile (14.5/km^{2}). The racial makeup of the town was 98.25% White, 0.20% African American, 0.19% Native American, 0.91% Asian, 0.07% Pacific Islander, 0.11% from other races, and 0.26% from two or more races. Hispanic or Latino of any race were 0.52% of the population.

There were 1,953 households, out of which 42.3% had children under the age of 18 living with them, 72.3% were married couples living together, 5.9% had a female householder with no husband present, and 18.4% were non-families. 13.5% of all households were made up of individuals, and 4.1% had someone living alone who was 65 years of age or older. The average household size was 2.83 and the average family size was 3.12.

In the town the population was spread out, with 28.4% under the age of 18, 7.1% from 18 to 24, 32.4% from 25 to 44, 25.3% from 45 to 64, and 6.7% who were 65 years of age or older. The median age was 36 years. For every 100 females, there were 104.7 males. For every 100 females age 18 and over, there were 102.2 males.

The median income for a household in the town was $55,718, and the median income for a family was $60,324. Males had a median income of $38,635 versus $28,602 for females. The per capita income for the town was $23,395. About 3.1% of families and 3.1% of the population were below the poverty line, including 4.4% of those under age 18 and 4.9% of those age 65 or over.

== Parks and recreation ==
Municipal Park which has shelters, playgrounds and ball diamonds

- Friendship Park: 2350 Sunny Meadow Drive
- Gooding Park: 2200 Old Highway 51
- Kronenwetter Forestry Unit: 4420 East State Highway 153
- Leather Camp Forestry Unit: 4445 East State Highway 153
- Municipal Park: 1582 Kronenwetter Drive
- Norm Plaza Memorial Park: 1077 Russell Street
- Seville Park: 2200 Glendalen Road
- Buska Park: 2390 Terrebonne Drive
- Tower Park Recreational & Soccer Fields: 2355 Tower Road
- Joe Swiderski Park: 1750 Sunkist Street

== Education ==
The village is served by two public school districts: the D.C. Everest School District, serving students in the northern half of the village, and the Mosinee School District, serving students in the southern half of the village. Northland Lutheran High School, a private Lutheran (Wisconsin Synod) school for grades 9 through 12, is located in Kronenwetter.

== Transportation ==
- U.S. Highway 51
- Interstate 39
- Highway 153 (Wisconsin)

The Central Wisconsin Airport (KCWA) serves Kronenwetter, the county and surrounding communities with both scheduled commercial jet service and general aviation services.

== Public services ==
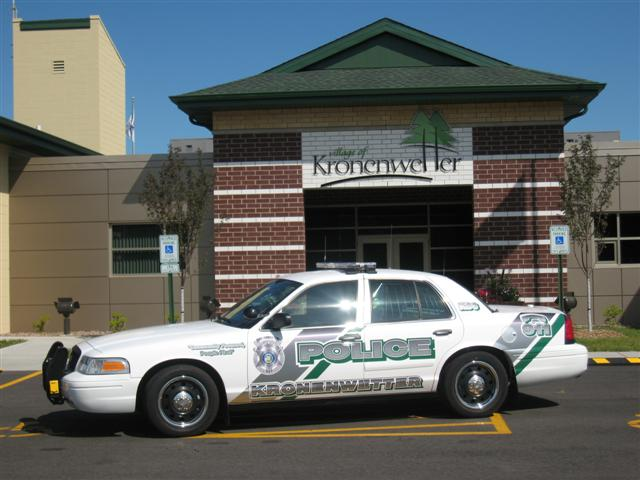
Kronenwetter Police squad car in front of the Municipal Center

In 2004, when the village of Kronenwetter created a police department, Daniel Joling was hired as the chief of police and sole member of the department. Officers and clerical staff have since been added to the department. Since July 2, 2007, the Kronenwetter Police Department has provided 24-hour-a-day coverage for the village.

The Kronenwetter Fire Department provides fire and rescue services for the village of Kronenwetter and the town of Guenther.

EMS service is provided through contract by the Riverside Fire District.

== Notable person ==
- Sebastian Kronenwetter, pioneer, businessman and state legislator
