= Norman Knudson =

American politician

Member of the Wisconsin Senate from the 15th district
- In office January 2, 1899 – January 5, 1903
- Preceded by: John McMullen
- Succeeded by: Samuel W. Randolph

Personal details
- Born: April 30, 1874 Manitowoc, Wisconsin, U.S.
- Died: April 9, 1934 (aged 59) Manitowoc, Wisconsin, U.S.
- Resting place: Evergreen Cemetery, Manitowoc, Wisconsin
- Party: Republican

Military service
- Allegiance: United States
- Branch/service: Wisconsin National Guard; United States Volunteers
- Years of service: 1890–1903 (WNG); 1898 (USV)
- Rank: 1st Lieutenant, USV; Captain, WNG
- Unit: 2nd Reg. Wis. Vol. Infantry
- Battles/wars: Spanish–American War: Puerto Rico campaign

Norman Alfred Knudson (April 30, 1874 – April 9, 1934) was an American businessman and Republican politician. He was a member of the Wisconsin State Senate from 1899 through 1902, representing Manitowoc and Calumet counties.

== Early life and war service ==
Knudson was born on April 30, 1874, in Manitowoc, Wisconsin. He later joined the Wisconsin National Guard in 1890. At the outbreak of the Spanish–American War, he volunteered for service and was mustered as first lieutenant of Company H in the 2nd Wisconsin Infantry Regiment. With the 2nd Wisconsin Infantry, he participated in the Puerto Rico campaign and commanded Company H throughout the war, due to the sickness of his captain, William Abel. After the war, he remained in the national guard until 1903 and was promoted to the rank of captain.

== Political career ==
Immediately after returning from the war, he became the Republican candidate for Wisconsin State Senate in the 15th State Senate district. Although the state of Wisconsin was heavily Republican in this era, the 15th Senate district was one of the most Democratic areas of the state. Knudson prevailed in a close general election, defeating Democratic candidate John P. Watt by just 37 votes. He was the youngest member of the Senate in 1899—only 24 years old at the start of the session.

== Later years ==
After his time in the Senate, he moved to Atlanta, Georgia, to work for a lumber company. He eventually returned to Wisconsin; he was secretary of the Chicago-Roosevelt Steamship company and the Maritime Securities company, and was also manager of the C. Reiss Coal company in Manitowoc. He died just before his 60th birthday, on April 9, 1934, after a long illness.

== Electoral history ==
=== Wisconsin Senate (1898) ===
Wisconsin Senate, 15th District Election, 1898
Party	Candidate	Votes	%	±%
General Election, November 8, 1898
Republican	Norman A. Knudson	4,891	49.81%	+6.69%
Democratic	John P. Watt	4,854	49.43%	−3.68%
Social Democratic	Abraham Andrews	74	0.75%	
Plurality		37	0.38%	-9.63%
Total votes		9,819	100.0%	+7.45%
Republican hold				

Wisconsin Senate
Preceded by John McMullen	Member of the Wisconsin State Assembly from the 15th district January 2, 1899 – January 5, 1903	Succeeded by Samuel W. Randolph
