= Henry M. Thompson =

American politician

Henry Mayo Thompson (December 28, 1861 – ?) was an American businessman and politician.

Born in Dover, Maine, Thompson moved with his parents to Milwaukee, Wisconsin. He was a clerk in a bank in Milwaukee. In 1888, Thompson moved to Mosinee, Wisconsin where he worked in the lumber industry. He served as supervisor of the Village of Mosinee. In 1897, Thompson served in the Wisconsin State Assembly and was a Republican. When the lumber mill ceased operations, Thompson moved back to Milwaukee, Wisconsin in 1902.
