= Owen A. Wells =

American politician (1844–1935)

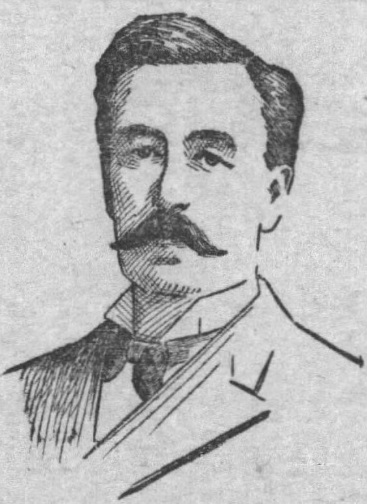
- Oshkosh Northwestern, May 17, 1904

Member of the U.S. House of Representatives from Wisconsin's 6th district
- In office March 4, 1893 – March 3, 1895
- Preceded by: Lucas M. Miller
- Succeeded by: Samuel A. Cook

Personal details
- Born: February 4, 1844 Catskill, New York, U.S.
- Died: January 29, 1935 (aged 90) Fond du Lac, Wisconsin, U.S.
- Resting place: Rienzi Cemetery, Fond du Lac, Wisconsin
- Party: Democratic
- Spouse: Juliette Bryan (m. 1872; died 1922)
- Parents: James Wells (father); Bridget (Wade) Wells (mother)
- Profession: Lawyer, politician

Owen Augustine Wells (February 4, 1844 – January 29, 1935) was an Irish American lawyer, Democratic politician, and Wisconsin pioneer. He served one term in the U.S. House of Representatives, representing Wisconsin's 6th congressional district during the 53rd Congress (1893–1895).

== Early life and education ==
Wells was born in Catskill, New York, on February 4, 1844. In 1850, Wells and his parents moved to a farm near Empire, Wisconsin, where he attended public and private schools. Wells also studied law.

== Career ==
Wells was admitted to the bar in 1870; he commenced practice in Fond du Lac, Wisconsin. Wells also engaged in agricultural pursuits and stock raising.

In 1885, Wells was appointed by President Grover Cleveland as Collector of Internal Revenue for Wisconsin's 3rd congressional district. He served until 1887, when the district was consolidated with the Milwaukee district.

Wells served as a delegate to the Democratic National Convention in 1888 and to the Gold Democratic National Convention in 1896, as well as to numerous state conventions of his party.

Wells served a single term in the United States House of Representatives, representing the 6th congressional district of Wisconsin as a Democrat in the 53rd United States Congress. His time in office began on March 4, 1893 and concluded on March 3, 1895.

Wells was an unsuccessful candidate for re-election in 1894 to the 54th United States Congress. He declined to accept any public office and resumed practicing law in Fond du Lac.

== Personal life and death ==
Owen Wells was the fourth of fourteen children born to Irish American immigrants James Wells and Bridget (née Wade) Wells.

On October 7, 1872, Owen Wells married Juliette Bryan, of Jefferson County, New York. They had no children and were married for fifty years before her death in 1922.

Wells retired in 1901. He resided in Fond du Lac, where he died at the age of 90 on January 29, 1935. Wells was interred in Rienzi Cemetery, located in Fond du Lac.

== Electoral history ==
=== U.S. House of Representatives (1892, 1894) ===
Year	Election	Date	Elected				Defeated				Total	Plurality
1892	General	Nov. 8	Owen A. Wells	Democratic	20,212	51.11%	Emil Baensch	Rep.	17,847	45.13%	39,544	2,365
1892	General	Nov. 8	Owen A. Wells	Democratic	20,212	51.11%	Charles H. Forward	Proh.	892	2.26%	39,544	2,365
1892	General	Nov. 8	Owen A. Wells	Democratic	20,212	51.11%	Peter A. Griffith	Peo.	593	1.50%	39,544	2,365
1894	General	Nov. 6	Samuel A. Cook	Republican	21,718	55.75%	Owen A. Wells (inc)	Dem.	14,919	38.30%	38,956	6,799
1894	General	Nov. 6	Samuel A. Cook	Republican	21,718	55.75%	Riley S. Bishop	Peo.	1,341	3.44%	38,956	6,799
1894	General	Nov. 6	Samuel A. Cook	Republican	21,718	55.75%	Byron E. Van Keuren	Proh.	977	2.51%	38,956	6,799

== See also ==
- List of United States representatives who served a single term

U.S. House of Representatives
Preceded by Lucas M. Miller	Member of the U.S. House of Representatives from Wisconsin's 6th congressional district 1893–1895	Succeeded by Samuel A. Cook
