= Samuel W. Randolph =

American politician

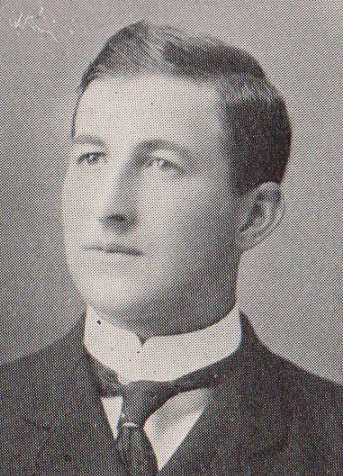

Member of the Wisconsin Senate from the 15th district
- In office 1903–1914
- Preceded by: Norman Knudson
- Succeeded by: Henry Rollman

Personal details
- Born: December 5, 1872 Manitowoc, Wisconsin, US
- Died: 1941 (aged 68–69)
- Party: Democratic

Samuel W. Randolph was a member of the Wisconsin State Senate.

== Biography ==
Randolph was born on December 5, 1872, in Manitowoc, Wisconsin. For many years he was interested in navigation of the Great Lakes and represented several transportation companies. He was appointed as a Harbor Master in January 1902, to fill the unexpired term and reappointed for a full term in April, 1902.

He died in 1941.

== Political career ==
Randolph was a member of the Senate from 1903 to 1914. He was a Democrat.
