= Lloydtown, Ontario =

Lloydtown
- Unincorporated community
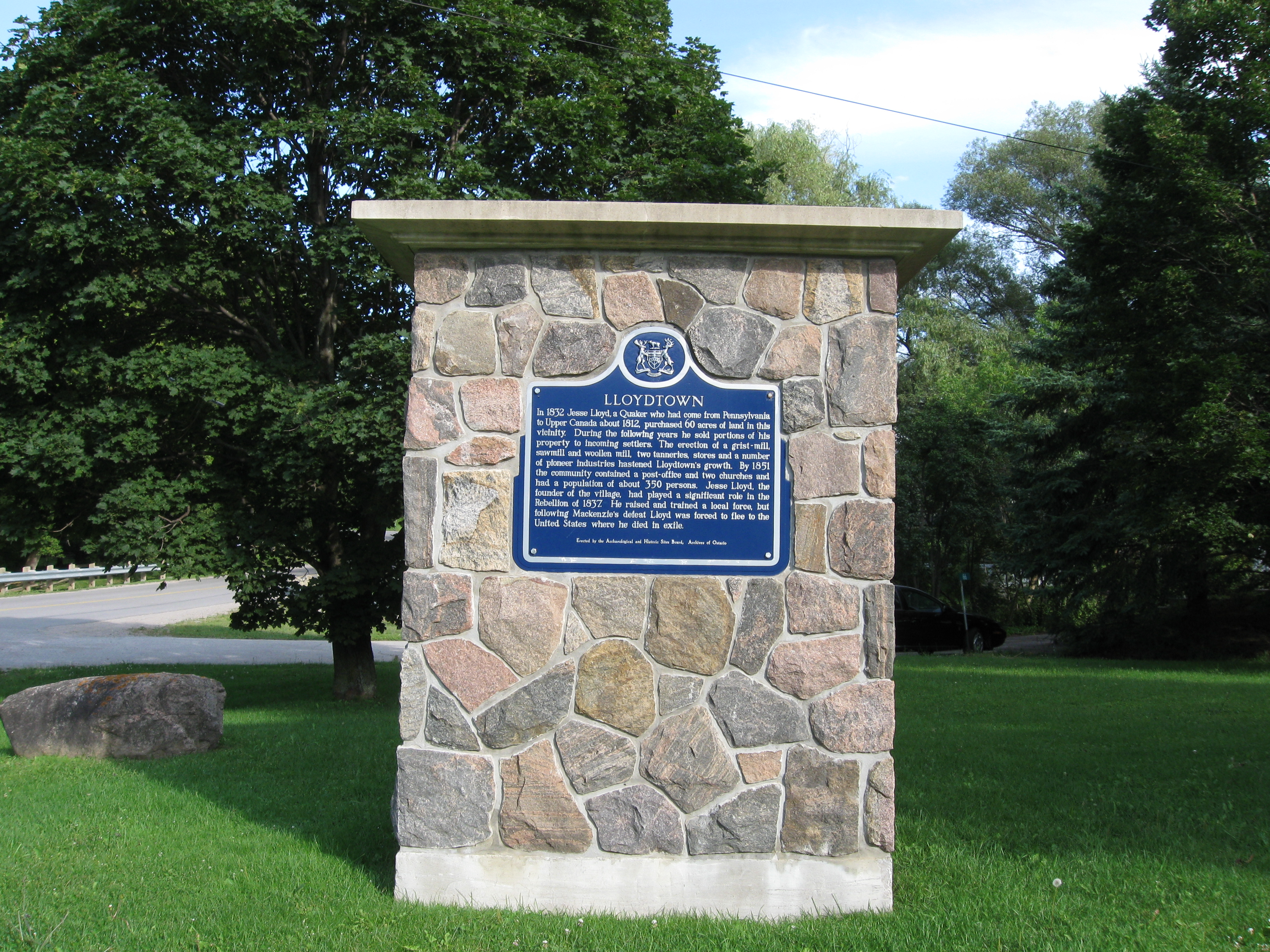
- Jesse Lloyd historical plaque.

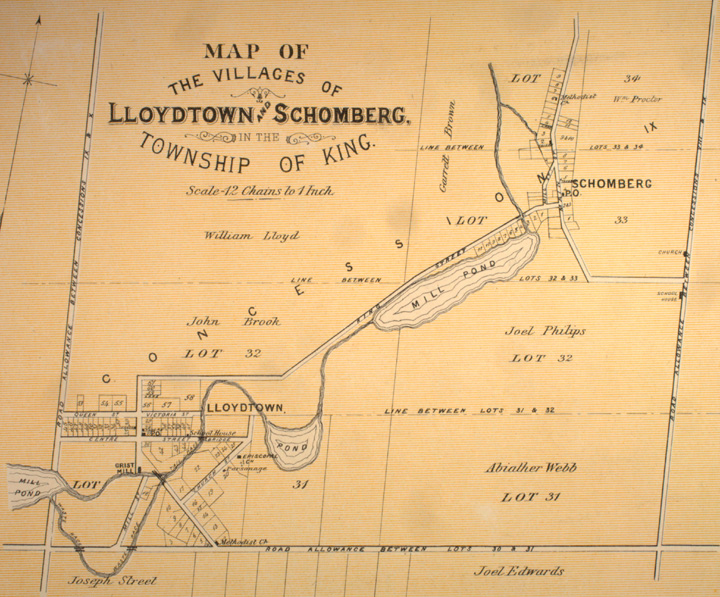
- A map from 1878 showing lots 30-34 in King Township, including the communities of Lloydtown and Schomberg.

- Location within Canada Location within Ontario Location within North America
- Coordinates: 43°59′27″N 79°41′41″W
- Country: Canada
- Province: Ontario
- Regional Municipality: York
- Township: King

Government
  - Township mayor: Steve Pellegrini
  - MP: Deb Schulte
  - MPP: Stephen Lecce
  - Councillor: Bill Cober (Ward 4)
- Time zone: UTC-5 (EST)
  - Summer (DST): UTC-4 (EDT)
- Forward sortation area: L0G
- Area codes: 905 and 289
- NTS Map: 030M13
- GNBC Code: FBZYW

Lloydtown is a hamlet located in King Township, Ontario, Canada. It is often associated with the surrounding and larger Schomberg, though it has its own unique characteristics and heritage.

== History ==
The Lloydtown Rebellion of 1837 was part of the Upper Canada Rebellion. During the 1830s, Lloydtown was well known as a site for reform sympathisers, and regular meetings were hosted by Jesse Lloyd. On November 24, 1837, a final meeting to review plans was held between Lloyd and William Lyon Mackenzie. Hoping to take advantage of the departure of troops to Lower Canada in response to the Lower Canada Rebellion, Mackenzie had planned to seize a government arms cache in York on December 7.

== Climate ==
Lloydtown has a continental climate moderated by the Great Lakes and influenced by warm, moist air masses from the south, and cold, dry air from the north. The Oak Ridges Moraine affects levels of precipitation: as an air mass arrives from Lake Ontario and reaches the elevated ground surface of the moraine, it rises causing precipitation.

Climate data for Lloydtown
Month	Jan	Feb	Mar	Apr	May	Jun	Jul	Aug	Sep	Oct	Nov	Dec	Year
Record high °C (°F)	13.0 (55.4)	14.5 (58.1)	24.0 (75.2)	30.0 (86.0)	32.5 (90.5)	35.5 (95.9)	36.0 (96.8)	35.6 (96.1)	33.0 (91.4)	27.0 (80.6)	24.0 (75.2)	20.0 (68.0)	36.0 (96.8)
Mean daily maximum °C (°F)	−3.4 (25.9)	−2.3 (27.9)	3.1 (37.6)	11.0 (51.8)	18.5 (65.3)	23.6 (74.5)	26.3 (79.3)	25.1 (77.2)	20.1 (68.2)	13.1 (55.6)	6.0 (42.8)	−0.4 (31.3)	11.7 (53.1)
Mean daily minimum °C (°F)	−11.4 (11.5)	−10.6 (12.9)	−5.5 (22.1)	1.2 (34.2)	6.4 (43.5)	11.3 (52.3)	13.9 (57.0)	13.0 (55.4)	9.0 (48.2)	3.6 (38.5)	−1.0 (30.2)	−7.2 (19.0)	1.9 (35.4)
Record low °C (°F)	−36.0 (−32.8)	−33.0 (−27.4)	−29.0 (−20.2)	−14.0 (6.8)	−4.0 (24.8)	−2.0 (28.4)	2.5 (36.5)	0.5 (32.9)	−6.5 (20.3)	−8.9 (16.0)	−22.0 (−7.6)	−31.5 (−24.7)	−36.0 (−32.8)
Average precipitation mm (inches)	53.9 (2.12)	44.4 (1.75)	55.0 (2.17)	62.8 (2.47)	72.0 (2.83)	75.1 (2.96)	87.8 (3.46)	88.6 (3.49)	83.3 (3.28)	68.3 (2.69)	57.3 (2.26)	25.4 (1.00)	690.9 (27.20)
Source: Environment Canada

== Notable people ==
- Alfred M. Cook, American politician and farmer, was born in Lloydtown.
