= Sebastian Kronenwetter =

American politician

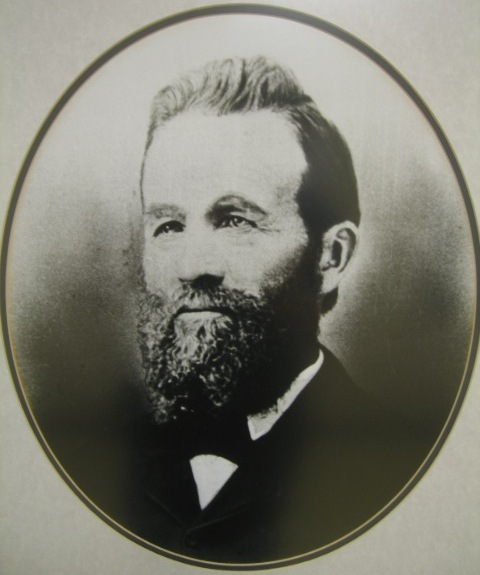
Sebastian Kronenwetter

Sebastian Kronenwetter (January 20, 1833 – April 27, 1902) was a Wisconsin pioneer, businessman, and state legislator.

Born in Württemberg, Kronenwetter and his family emigrated to the United States settling in Pennsylvania. In 1857, Kronenwetter came to Marathon County, Wisconsin, where he was in the logging and lumbering business in the Mosinee, Wisconsin area. The village of Kronenwetter, Wisconsin was named after him. In 1885–1887, Kronenwetter served in the Wisconsin State Assembly, as a Democrat, for one term.

His grandson, Ralph E. Kronenwetter, would become Mayor of Mosinee.
