= Willis F. La Du =

American politician

Willis F. La Du was a member of the Wisconsin State Assembly.

== Biography ==
La Du was born on July 2, 1856, in Richmond Township, Tioga County, Pennsylvania. He moved with his parents to Mosinee, Wisconsin, in 1866. He was in the lumber business. La Du died on August 30, 1929.

== Career ==
La Du was elected to the Assembly in 1902. Additionally, he served as President of the Board of Supervisors of Bergen, Marathon County, Wisconsin, from 1888 to 1890, President of Mosinee in 1890 and Postmaster of Mosinee from 1904 to 1908. He was a Democrat.
