= Walter E. Cook =

American politician

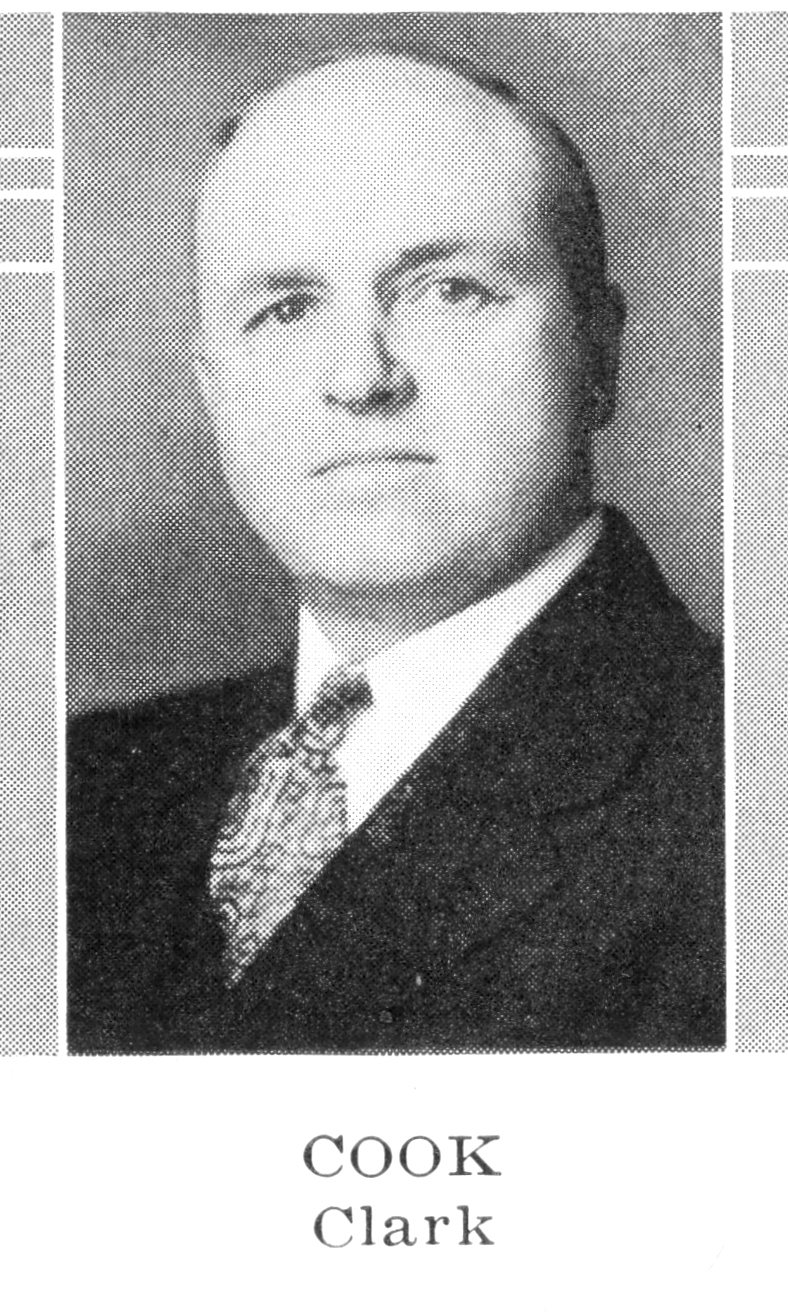
Walter E. Cook

Walter E. Cook (December 21, 1888 – October 12, 1955) was a member of the Wisconsin State Assembly.

== Biography ==
Cook was born on December 21, 1888, in Unity, Wisconsin. His brother, George, was a member of the Marathon County, Wisconsin Board of Supervisors. On August 27, 1914, Cook married Minnie Yahr. They had two children. He died on October 12, 1955.

== Career ==
Cook was a member of the Assembly twice. First, from 1939 to 1945 and second, from 1951 until his death. He was a Republican. He also served on the Unity school board as treasurer.
