= John W. Salter =

American politician and farmer (1852-1927)

John W. "J.W." Salter (February 25, 1852 – November 15, 1927) was an American politician and farmer. He was a member of the Wisconsin State Assembly.

Born near West Bend, Wisconsin, Salter went to University of Wisconsin–Madison. He raised cattle and was in the mercantile business. He help organized the high school in Unity, Wisconsin and was the principal. He was postmaster at Unity, Wisconsin, served on the Marathon County, Wisconsin Board of Supervisors, and served on the board of education. He served in the Wisconsin State Assembly in 1923 and was a Republican. He died of anemia at his home in Unity, Wisconsin.
