= August Zinn =

American politician

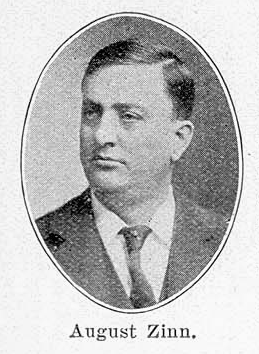
Photo from Wisconsin Blue Book 1901

August Zinn was an American politician from Milwaukee, Wisconsin who spent two terms (1899-1902) as a Republican member of the Wisconsin State Assembly from Milwaukee County.

== Background and business ==
Zinn was born April 23, 1859, in Milwaukee. He was educated in the public school of that city's Second Ward, and became a wholesale jeweller, partnering with Charles C. Millman as Millman & Zinn, wholesale jewelers., later in partnership with his brother Berthold F. as Zinn Bros., and then with Edward Voss as Zinn and Voss.

== Elective office ==
In 1898 he was elected to the Assembly from the fourth Milwaukee County district (the 15th and 16th Wards of the City of Milwaukee), with 2119 votes, to 1233 for Democrat Solomon Dalberg, 125 for Populist James Bass, and 80 for Socialist Louis Firnges (Republican incumbent Frank A. Anson was not a candidate). He was assigned to the standing committee on manufactures, which he chaired; and the joint committee on fish and game. He was re-elected in 1900, with 2865 votes to 1930 for Democrat Max Nohl, and 216 for Socialist Carl Barkmann. He switched to the Assembly's standing committee on assessment and collection of taxes, and remained on the fish and game committee, of which he became chair.

He was not a candidate for re-election in 1902, and was succeeded by fellow Republican Fred C. Westfahl Jr.

== Later life ==
Zinn left the jewelry business around 1910, and by 1917 was a member and secretary of the Milwaukee County Civil Service Commission. He was still in that position at the time of his death on August 4, 1928. He was survived by a wife, one son and one daughter.
