= Jesse Lloyd =

Canadian Quaker

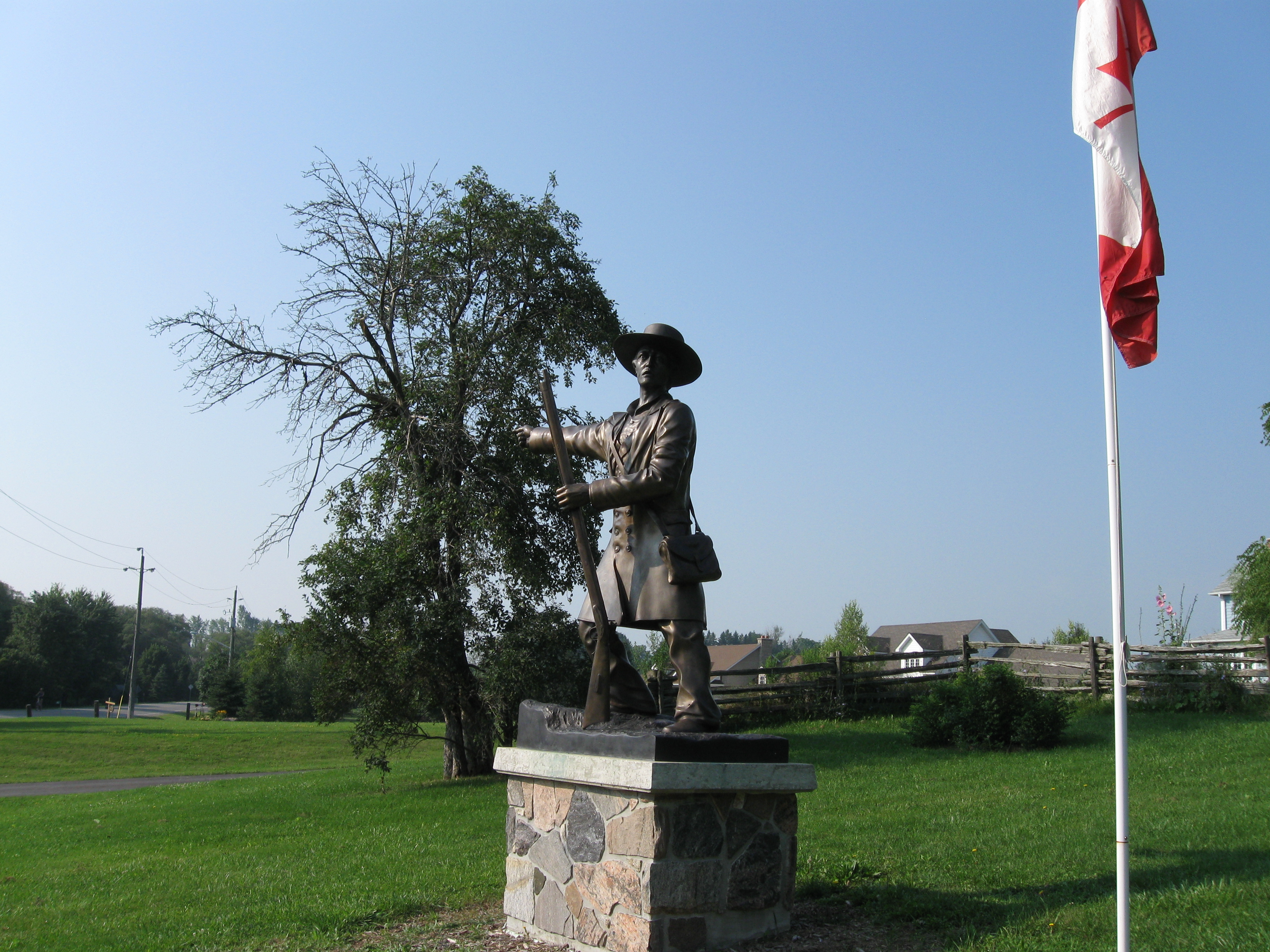
Statue in Lloydtown.

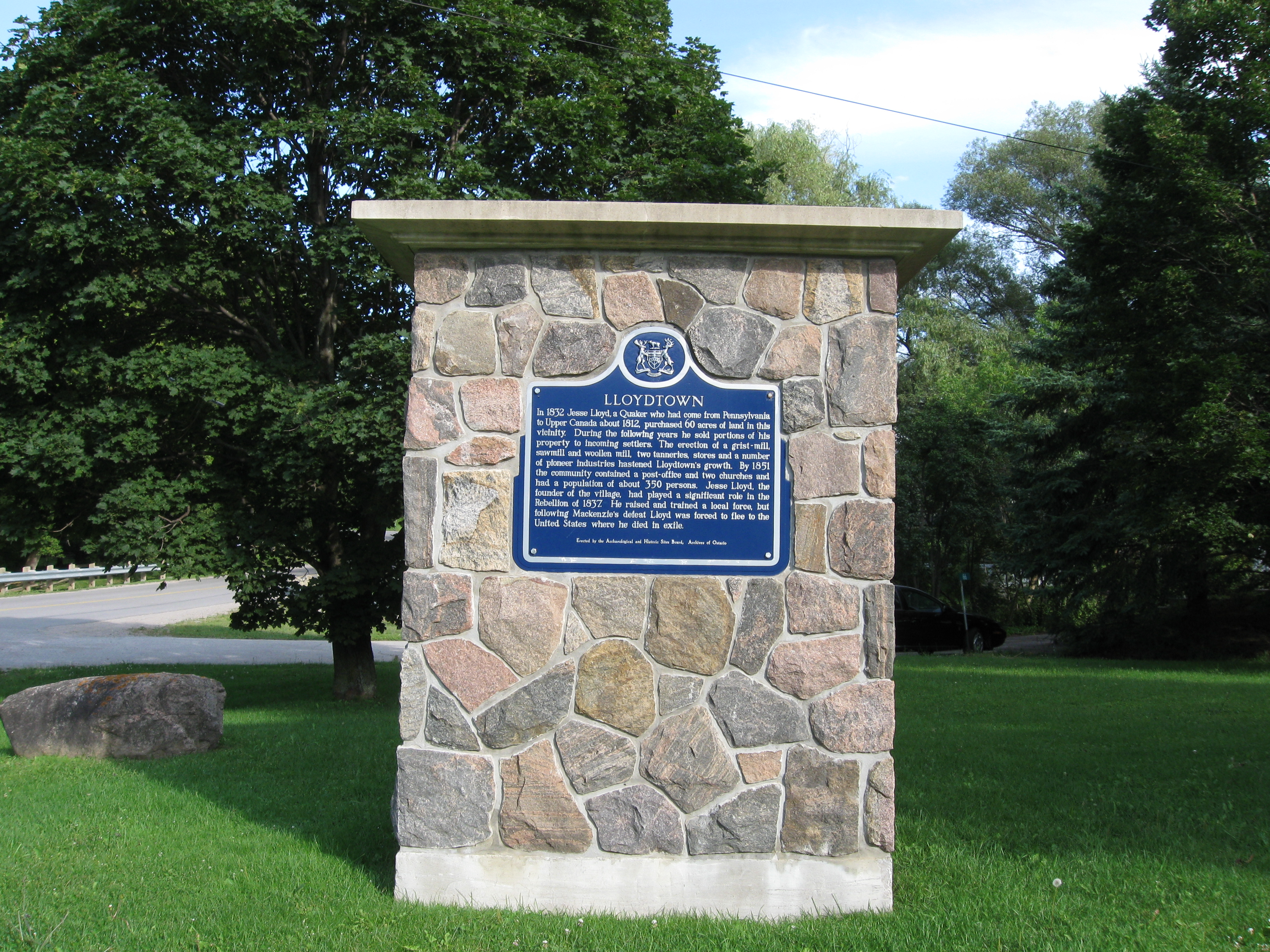
Historical marker in Lloydtown.

Jesse Lloyd (11 January 1786 – 27 September 1838) was the founder of Lloydtown, Ontario and a leader in the Upper Canada Rebellion of 1837. Born in Springfield Township, Pennsylvania, he was the third son of Quakers William Lloyd and Susannah Heacock. The Lloyds, who were United Empire Loyalists, possibly came to Canada at Niagara in 1788 but soon returned to the United States. They likely immigrated permanently to Upper Canada in 1808. Upon arrival, they crossed the Niagara gorge and migrated north to settle in the 10th concession of King Township.

By 1824, Jesse Lloyd had established a sawmill in Tecumseth Township. Later he was active in King Township where he bought and sold lots, built several mills and, in the process, established the village of Lloydtown, Ontario.

== Rebellion ==
In the days of the Family Compact in Upper Canada, agitation grew from year to year. Meetings for reform were held all over the home district and even in some remote parts of the province. Lloyd was a local leader in public affairs in his district.

During the Upper Canada Rebellion in 1837, a proclamation was issued and a reward of 500 pounds was put on Lloyd's head. He was forced to flee the country and he went to Tippecanoe County, Indiana, where he lived out the last few months until his death in 1838. Lloyd was the only family member to flee with the rest remaining in Canada.
