= Evergreen, Marathon County, Wisconsin =

Evergreen
- Former CDP
- Location within the state of Wisconsin
- Coordinates: 44°50′50″N 89°37′39″W
- Country: United States
- State: Wisconsin
- County: Marathon

Area
  - Total: 3.8 sq mi (9.9 km^{2})
  - Land: 3.8 sq mi (9.9 km^{2})

Population (2000)
  - Total: 3,611
  - Density: 940/sq mi (360/km^{2})
- Time zone: UTC-6 (Central (CST))
  - Summer (DST): UTC-5 (CDT)
- Area codes: 715 & 534

Evergreen is a former census-designated place (CDP) in Marathon County, Wisconsin, United States. The population was 3,611 at the 2000 census. Evergreen is now part of the village of Kronenwetter, which was incorporated on June 17, 2003.

== Geography ==
Evergreen is located at 44°50′50″N 89°37′39″W (44.847312, -89.627491).

According to the United States Census Bureau, the CDP had a total area of 3.8 square miles (9.9 km^{2}), all of it land.

== Demographics ==
As of the census of 2000, there were 3,611 people, 1,228 households, and 1,015 families residing in the CDP. The population density was 946.5 people per square mile (365.9/km^{2}). There were 1,267 housing units at an average density of 332.1/sq mi (128.4/km^{2}). The racial makeup of the CDP was 98.20% White, 0.08% African American, 0.22% Native American, 1.11% Asian, 0.17% from other races, and 0.22% from two or more races. Hispanic or Latino of any race were 0.22% of the population.

There were 1,228 households, out of which 46.3% had children under the age of 18 living with them, 72.9% were married couples living together, 6.5% had a female householder with no husband present, and 17.3% were non-families. 11.8% of all households were made up of individuals, and 2.3% had someone living alone who was 65 years of age or older. The average household size was 2.91 and the average family size was 3.18.

In the CDP, the population was spread out, with 30.6% under the age of 18, 7.2% from 18 to 24, 32.5% from 25 to 44, 25.0% from 45 to 64, and 4.7% who were 65 years of age or older. The median age was 34 years. For every 100 females, there were 104.4 males. For every 100 females age 18 and over, there were 102.8 males.

The median income for a household in the CDP was $58,774, and the median income for a family was $61,699. Males had a median income of $38,784 versus $27,796 for females. The per capita income for the CDP was $21,467. About 4.6% of families and 4.6% of the population were below the poverty line, including 5.9% of those under age 18 and 12.9% of those age 65 or over.
