= Robert Plisch =

American politician

Robert Plisch (April 7, 1845 – March 13, 1915) was an American politician and farmer.

Born in Silesia, Kingdom of Prussia, Plisch emigrated with his family to the United States in 1856. He was a farmer and lived in the community of Ziegler, in the town of Berlin, in Marathon County. He served on the Berlin Town Board, the Marathon County Board of Supervisors, and was deputy sheriff. He was also involved with the Marathon County Agricultural Society. He served in the Wisconsin State Assembly in 1895 and was a Democrat.
