= Louie Augustus Lange =

American politician (1854–1917)

Louis Augustus Lange (1854 – December 24, 1917) was a member of the Wisconsin State Assembly.

== Biography ==
Lange was born in Chicago, Illinois in 1854, the son of August A. Lange and Catharine Trumbauer Lange. He moved with his parents to Fond du Lac, Wisconsin in 1856. After the death of his first wife, Jennie S. Vaughn (1856–1899), he married Rose LaBlanc in 1903. Following his legislative career, he worked as the editor of the Daily Reporter. Lange died in Los Angeles on December 24, 1917.

== Career ==
Lange was a member of the Assembly from 1893 to 1900. He was a Democrat.
