= Mosinee, Wisconsin =

- City
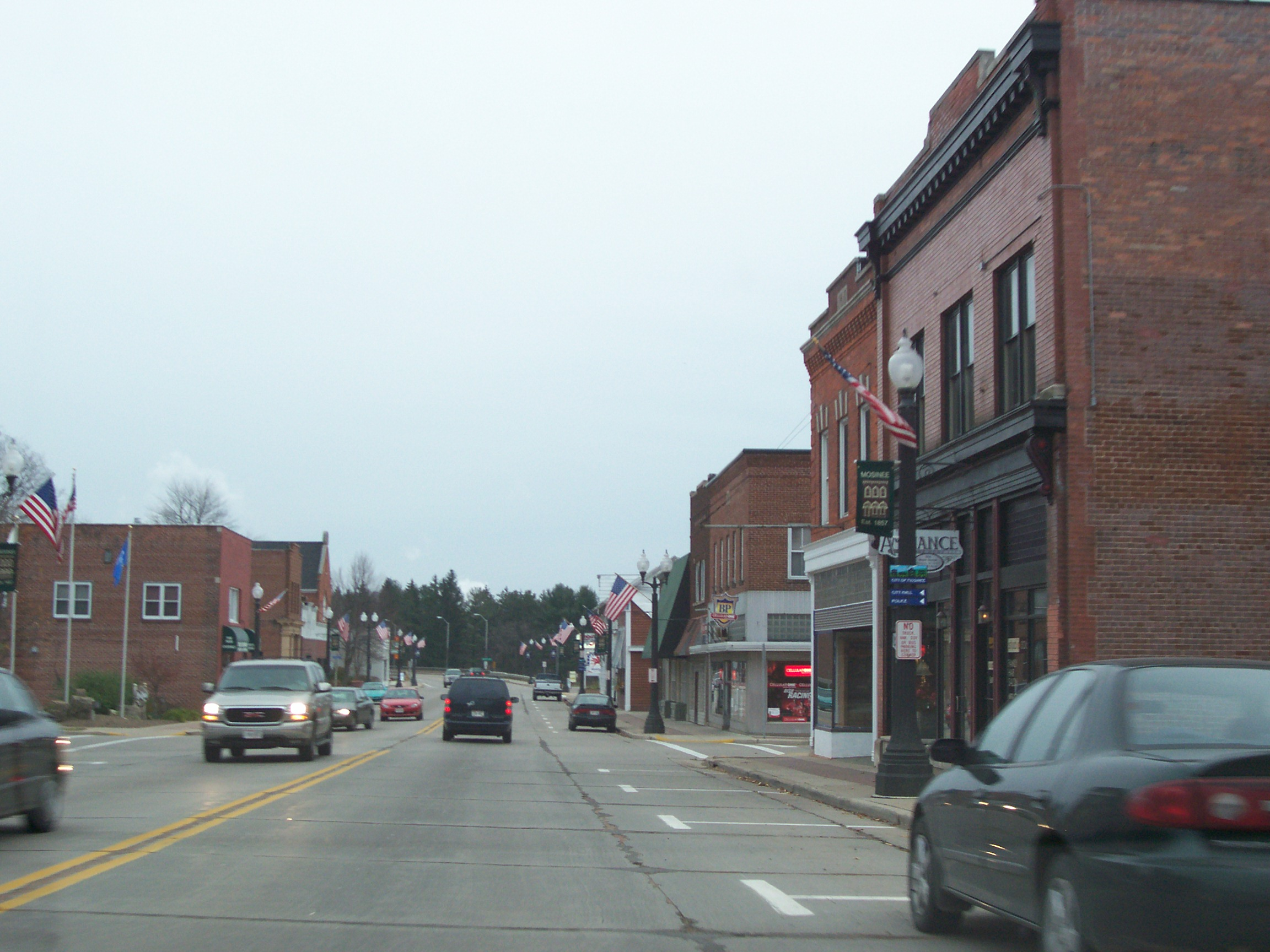
- Downtown Mosinee

- Location of Mosinee in Marathon County, Wisconsin.

- Location within Wisconsin Location within the United States
- Coordinates: 44°47′30″N 89°42′19″W
- Country: United States
- State: Wisconsin
- County: Marathon
- Incorporated (village): 1889
- Incorporated (city): April 7, 1931; 95 years ago

Government
  - Mayor: Peter Nievinski

Area
  - Total: 8.72 sq mi (22.59 km^{2})
  - Land: 7.73 sq mi (20.01 km^{2})
  - Water: 0.86 sq mi (2.24 km^{2})

Population (2020)
  - Total: 4,452
  - Density: 518.3/sq mi (200.13/km^{2})
- Time zone: UTC-6 (Central (CST))
  - Summer (DST): UTC-5 (CDT)
- ZIP code: 54455
- Area codes: 715 & 534
- FIPS code: 55-54500
- Website: mosinee.wi.us

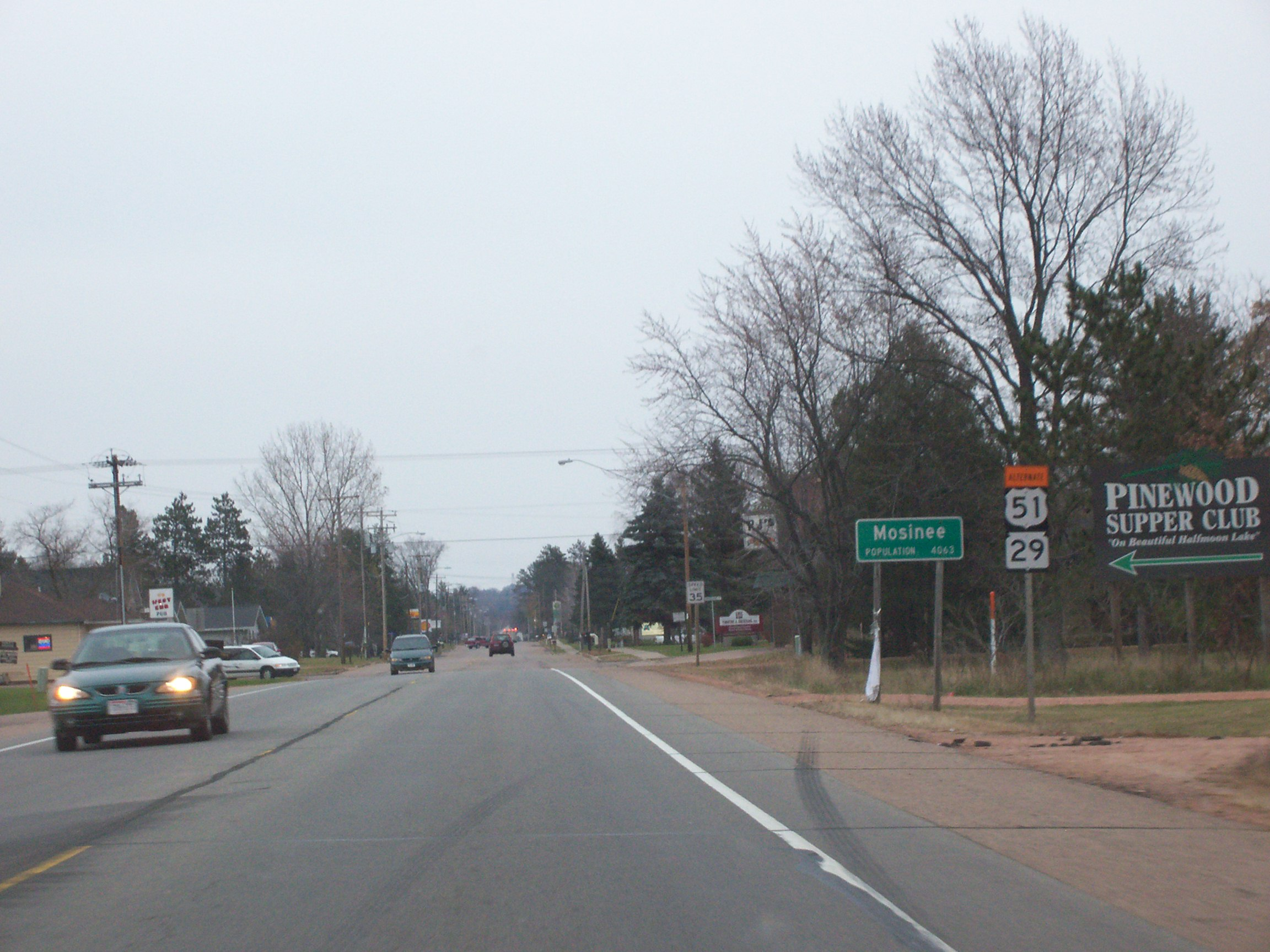
Sign on Wisconsin Highway 153

Mosinee is a city in Marathon County, Wisconsin, United States. It is part of the Wausau, Wisconsin Metropolitan Statistical Area. The population was 4,452 at the time of the 2020 census.

== History ==
=== Early history ===
The traditional inhabitants of the area were the Ojibwe, the Potawatomi and the Menominee. However, the name is the Hochunk Mōsį́nį, the "Cold Country," from mō, an old form of mą, meaning "earth, ground, land, country"; and sį́nį, "cold." The Ojibwe ceded the territory to the United States in 1837 when they sold most of their land in what would become Wisconsin, though they were guaranteed the right to continue hunting, fishing, and gathering wild rice on the ceded lands. Similarly, the Potawatomi gave up their land claims in Wisconsin in 1833, and the Menominee ceded territory in this area in the 1836 Treaty of the Cedars. These treaties coincided with the establishment of the first sawmill in the area by a white settler, John L. Moore, in 1836, and enabled white settlement to begin in the area. Lumber quickly became the most important industry and drew other businesses and settlers to the town, which at the time was known as Little Bull Falls. After the closing of Fort Winnebago in 1845, a number of Métis families moved to Little Bull Falls, and in 1857 the town was renamed in honor of an Ojibwe chief from the Wisconsin River Band. Deforestation led to the collapse of the lumber industry in the early 20th century, but it was quickly replaced by the paper industry. In the neighboring Menominee language the town is called Mōsāpnīw, "he dwells alone there", which is likely a close approximation of the eponymous chief's name.

=== Mock Communist invasion ===
On May 1, 1950, local residents acting as Communist invaders seized control of Mosinee, similar to Winnipeg's "If Day" reenactment of 1942.

The action was a part of an elaborate pageant organized by the Wisconsin Department of the American Legion. The "Communists" dragged Mayor Ralph E. Kronenwetter and Police Chief Carl Gewiss out of their beds. Mayor Kronenwetter surrendered at 10:15 AM in the town's new "Red Square" with a pistol to his back. The police chief was reported to have resisted and was "liquidated".

Roadblocks were set up around Mosinee, the library was "purged", prices of goods were inflated for the duration of the coup, and local restaurants served Russian black bread and potato soup for lunch.

As he arrived at a rally to restore democracy to the community the night of May 1, Mayor Kronenwetter suffered a heart attack and never regained consciousness. He died five days later on May 6, 1950 at age 49. The mayor's doctor said the excitement and exertion probably contributed to his collapse.

Franklin Baker, commander of the local American Legion post, said, "It was a terrible coincidence."

Local minister Will La Brew Bennett, 72, who, during the Communist invasion, demonstrated to the media how he would hide his Bible in the church organ if the Communists really invaded and was herded with other residents into a barbed-wire ringed "concentration camp" near "Red Square", was found dead in his bed hours after the mayor's death on May 7, 1950.

== Geography ==
Mosinee is located at 44°47'30" North, 89°42'19" West (44.791709, −89.705301).

According to the United States Census Bureau, the city has a total area of 8.54 square miles (22.12 km^{2}), of which 7.77 square miles (20.12 km^{2}) is land and 0.77 square miles (1.99 km^{2}) is water.

== Demographics ==
Historical population
Census	Pop.	Note	%±
1880	201		—
1890	427		112.4%
1900	657		53.9%
1910	482		−26.6%
1920	1,161		140.9%
1930	1,229		5.9%
1940	1,361		10.7%
1950	1,453		6.8%
1960	2,067		42.3%
1970	2,395		15.9%
1980	3,015		25.9%
1990	3,820		26.7%
2000	4,063		6.4%
2010	3,988		−1.8%
2020	4,452		11.6%
U.S. Decennial Census

=== 2010 census ===
As of the census of 2010, there were 3,988 people, 1,660 households, and 1,110 families residing in the city. The population density was 513.3 inhabitants per square mile (198.2/km^{2}). There were 1,791 housing units at an average density of 230.5 per square mile (89.0/km^{2}). The racial makeup of the city was 97.6% White, 0.3% African American, 0.5% Native American, 0.5% Asian, 0.5% from other races, and 0.7% from two or more races. Hispanic or Latino of any race were 1.3% of the population.

There were 1,660 households, of which 32.0% had children under the age of 18 living with them, 50.4% were married couples living together, 10.8% had a female householder with no husband present, 5.6% had a male householder with no wife present, and 33.1% were non-families. 27.5% of all households were made up of individuals, and 10.9% had someone living alone who was 65 years of age or older. The average household size was 2.39 and the average family size was 2.89.

The median age in the city was 39.1 years. 25% of residents were under the age of 18; 7.1% were between the ages of 18 and 24; 26.7% were from 25 to 44; 25.5% were from 45 to 64; and 15.6% were 65 years of age or older. The gender makeup of the city was 49.2% male and 50.8% female.

=== 2000 census ===
As of the census of 2000, there were 4,063 people, 1,635 households, and 1,111 families residing in the city. The population density was 522.2 people per square mile (201.6/km^{2}). There were 1,711 housing units at an average density of 219.9 per square mile (84.9/km^{2}). The racial makeup of the city was 98.79% White, 0.12% Black or African American, 0.12% Native American, 0.22% Asian, 0.32% from other races, and 0.42% from two or more races. Hispanic or Latino of any race were 0.69% of the population.

There were 1,635 households, out of which 34.5% had children under the age of 18 living with them, 54.0% were married couples living together and 32.0% were non-families. 26.9% of all households were made up of individuals, and 12.4% had someone living alone who was 65 years of age or older. The average household size was 2.47 and the average family size was 3.00.

In the city, the population was spread out, with 26.3% under the age of 18, 8.1% from 18 to 24, 30.1% from 25 to 44, 20.3% from 45 to 64, and 15.2% who were 65 years of age or older. The median age was 35 years. For every 100 females, there were 95.0 males. For every 100 females age 18 and over, there were 89.7 males.

The median income for a household in the city was $46,109, and the median income for a family was $51,776. Males had a median income of $34,494 versus $25,572 for females. The per capita income for the city was $18,700. About 2.8% of families and 5.5% of the population were below the poverty line, including 4.3% of those under age 18 and 7.9% of those age 65 or over.

== Transportation ==
=== Airport ===
Central Wisconsin Airport (CWA) is located 2 miles (3 km) southeast of the Mosinee central business district. The airport provides both scheduled commercial jet service and general aviation services.

On October 24, 2018, the airport was the site of a Donald Trump "Make America Great Again" rally. Attendees lined up to gain entry to the rally up to 29 hours before the event was scheduled to begin.

== Education ==
=== Joseph Dessert Library ===
Joseph Dessert came from Canada to Mosinee (then known as "Little Bull Falls") in 1844. He built and equipped a free library for the community. Dedicated on February 11, 1899, the building was used as a library, as well as a post office, village hall, and school, and it was the scene of many community events, including dances and balls. The library was the only place in the community with theater facilities, so amateur plays were often presented there, and school commencements were held in the Grand Hall. The library existed as a city library until 1974, when the library and municipal boards recommended that the Joseph Dessert Library should join the Marathon County Public Library. Since then, it has also come to be known as the Marathon County Public Library – Mosinee Branch.

Celebrations have marked two significant anniversaries for the library, the first in 1949 at the 50th anniversary, and the second in 1999 at the time of the library's 100th year. Several renovations have also taken place, with the most recent occurring in 1995 as part of a county-wide building and improvement program for libraries. Today, the library maintains its status in the City of Mosinee as both an important community service and as a building significant to the history of the community. The library building is listed on the National Register of Historic Places.

=== Mosinee School District ===
Mosinee is within the Mosinee School District.

== Notable people ==
- John Altenburgh, Jazz/Blues musician and composer
- Cole Caufield, NHL hockey player for the Montreal Canadiens
- Kevin Cywinski, NASCAR driver
- Willis F. La Du, state legislator
- Kole Heckendorf, football player
- William A. Kasten, state legislator
- Sebastian Kronenwetter, pioneer, businessman, state legislator
- Thomas J. Springer, state legislator
- Henry M. Thompson, state legislator
