= William Arnemann =

American businessman and politician (1850-1917)

Member of the Wisconsin State Assembly
- In office 1915–1917
- In office 1903

Personal details
- Born: October 14, 1850 Hanover, Germany
- Died: December 10, 1917 (aged 67) Neenah, Wisconsin
- Party: Democratic
- Spouse: Mary Bruening (m. 1872–1916)
- Children: 10

William F. Arnemann (October 14, 1850 – December 10, 1917) was a German-born American businessman and politician who served as a member of the Wisconsin State Assembly.

== Background ==
Born in Hanover, Germany, Arnemann emigrated with his parents at age five and settled in West Bend, Wisconsin. In 1870, Arnemann started a soda water factory in Neenah, Wisconsin and was also in the ice business. He married Mary Bruening in 1872, with whom he had 10 children. Bruening was killed by a train in 1916.

Arnemann served on the Neenah Common Council and was mayor of Neenah. He also served on the Winnebago County, Wisconsin Board of Supervisors. Arnemann was a Democrat. He served in the Wisconsin State Assembly in 1903 and from 1915 until his death in 1917.

Arnemann died of heart failure in 1917 in Neenah, Wisconsin, aged 67.
