= Gilbert Vandercook =

American politician

Gilbert E. Vandercook (June 1, 1866 – July 23, 1957) was an American newspaper editor, lawyer, and politician.

Born in Newburg, Wisconsin, Vandercook was trained to be a printer and edited several newspapers in Wisconsin. He married Anna L. Thomas in 1885. In 1896, he graduated from the University of Wisconsin Law School. Vandercook worked in the office of the Wisconsin Secretary of State as a clerk and then as assistant secretary of state. He lived in Spencer, Wisconsin and edited the "Spencer Tribune." Vandercook served in the Wisconsin State Assembly in 1899. He was elected as a Democrat but declared himself a Republican. He died of a heart ailment at Milwaukee County General Hospital on July 23, 1957.
