= Lewis H. Cook =

American politician

Lewis (Louis) H. Cook (November 25, 1876 – September 4, 1934) was an American farmer and politician.

Born in Gravesville, Wisconsin, Cook moved with his family to Unity, Wisconsin and was raised there.

Cook raised beef, sheep, and poultry. Cook started the Marathon County Register newspaper and served on the Marathon County, Wisconsin Board of Supervisors. He was a Republican. In 1910, Cook moved to Wausau, Wisconsin and was elected county clerk in 1913. Cook served in the Wisconsin State Assembly in 1921. From 1923 until his death in 1934, Cook served as postmaster of Wausau, Wisconsin. He died in Wausau, Wisconsin.
