= Unity, Wisconsin =

- Village
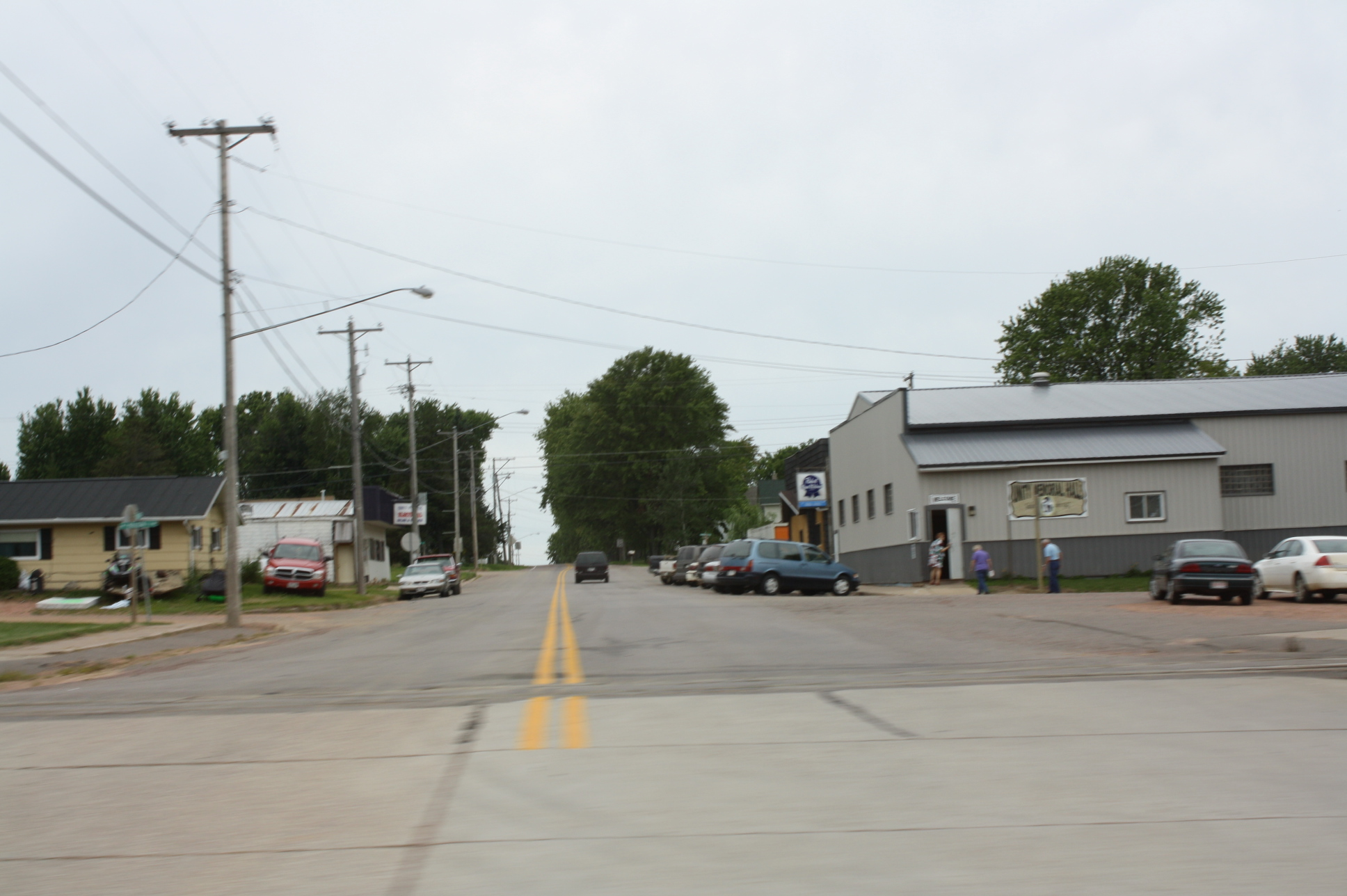
- Looking west at downtown Unity

- Location of Unity in Clark County and Marathon County, Wisconsin.

- Location within the state of Wisconsin Unity, Wisconsin (the United States)
- Coordinates: 44°50′53″N 90°18′54″W
- Country: United States
- State: Wisconsin
- County: Clark, Marathon

Area
  - Total: 0.99 sq mi (2.57 km^{2})
  - Land: 0.99 sq mi (2.57 km^{2})
  - Water: 0 sq mi (0.00 km^{2})

Population (2020)
  - Total: 384
  - Density: 387/sq mi (149/km^{2})
- Time zone: UTC-6 (Central (CST))
  - Summer (DST): UTC-5 (CDT)
- ZIP codes: 54488
- Area codes: 715 & 534
- FIPS code: 55-81850
- Website: villageofunity.com

Unity is a village in Clark and Marathon counties in the U.S. state of Wisconsin. It is part of the Wausau, Wisconsin Metropolitan Statistical Area. The population was 384 at the 2020 census. Of this, 233 were in Marathon County, and 151 were in Clark County. The village is located in northeastern town of Unity in Clark County and northwestern town of Brighton in Marathon County.

== Geography ==
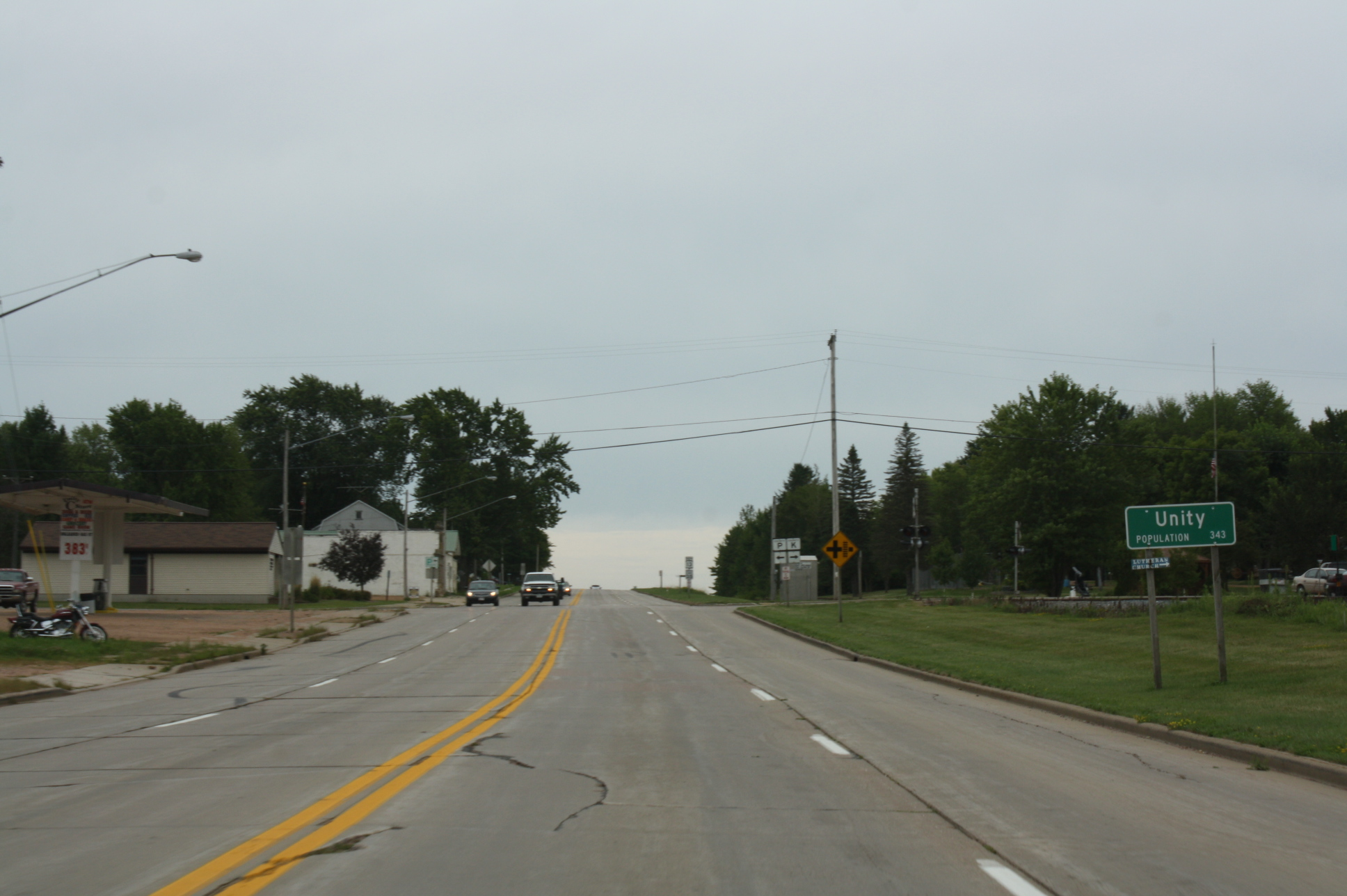
Road sign for Unity

Unity is located at 44°50′53″N 90°18′53″W (44.848191, -90.31497).

According to the United States Census Bureau, the village has a total area of 0.99 square miles (2.56 km^{2}), all land.

== Demographics ==
Historical population
Census	Pop.	Note	%±
1910	363		—
1920	405		11.6%
1930	319		−21.2%
1940	286		−10.3%
1950	355		24.1%
1960	386		8.7%
1970	363		−6.0%
1980	418		15.2%
1990	452		8.1%
2000	368		−18.6%
2010	343		−6.8%
2020	384		12.0%
U.S. Decennial Census

=== 2010 census ===
As of the census of 2010, there were 343 people, 145 households, and 101 families living in the village. The population density was 346.5 inhabitants per square mile (133.8/km^{2}). There were 161 housing units at an average density of 162.6 per square mile (62.8/km^{2}). The racial makeup of the village was 98.3% White, 1.5% from other races, and 0.3% from two or more races. Hispanic or Latino of any race were 1.5% of the population.

There were 145 households, of which 30.3% had children under the age of 18 living with them, 55.2% were married couples living together, 7.6% had a female householder with no husband present, 6.9% had a male householder with no wife present, and 30.3% were non-families. 27.6% of all households were made up of individuals, and 8.9% had someone living alone who was 65 years of age or older. The average household size was 2.37 and the average family size was 2.84.

The median age in the village was 41.3 years. 22.7% of residents were under the age of 18; 7.7% were between the ages of 18 and 24; 23.9% were from 25 to 44; 34.4% were from 45 to 64; and 11.4% were 65 years of age or older. The gender makeup of the village was 51.6% male and 48.4% female.

=== 2000 census ===
As of the census of 2000, there were 368 people, 150 households, and 97 families living in the village. The population density was 372.1 people per square mile (143.5/km^{2}). There were 157 housing units at an average density of 158.8 per square mile (61.2/km^{2}). The racial makeup of the village was 99.46% White, 0.54% from other races. 0.54% of the population were Hispanic or Latino of any race.

There were 150 households, out of which 35.3% had children under the age of 18 living with them, 52.7% were married couples living together, 8.7% had a female householder with no husband present, and 34.7% were non-families. 24.0% of all households were made up of individuals, and 10.0% had someone living alone who was 65 years of age or older. The average household size was 2.45 and the average family size was 3.02.

In the village, the population was spread out, with 26.9% under the age of 18, 7.6% from 18 to 24, 28.8% from 25 to 44, 22.8% from 45 to 64, and 13.9% who were 65 years of age or older. The median age was 38 years. For every 100 females, there were 103.3 males. For every 100 females age 18 and over, there were 99.3 males.

The median income for a household in the village was $31,458, and the median income for a family was $47,813. Males had a median income of $29,000 versus $21,250 for females. The per capita income for the village was $17,819. About 6.3% of families and 12.7% of the population were below the poverty line, including 17.3% of those under age 18 and 22.4% of those age 65 or over.

== Notable people ==
- Alfred M. Cook, farmer and politician, lived in Unity.
- Lewis H. Cook, newspaper editor and politician, lived near Unity.
- John W. Salter, farmer and politician, lived in Unity.
