= Henry Mumbrue =

19th century American politician

Henry C. Mumbrue

Member of the Wisconsin Senate from the 21st district
- In office January 1, 1877 – January 6, 1879
- Preceded by: Willis C. Silverthorn
- Succeeded by: John Azor Kellogg

Member of the Wisconsin State Assembly from the Waupaca district
- In office January 3, 1876 – January 1, 1877
- Preceded by: George H. Calkins
- Succeeded by: Asa L. Baldwin (Waupaca 1st); Hannibal Dixon (Waupaca 2nd)

Personal details
- Born: February 15, 1828 Tyre, New York, U.S.
- Died: April 8, 1898 (aged 70) Waupaca, Wisconsin, U.S.
- Resting place: Lakeside Memorial Park, Waupaca, Wisconsin
- Party: Democratic; Liberal Rep. (1870s); Republican (before 1872)
- Spouse: Harriet Ann Pritchett (died 1882)
- Children: Mary (Lea)^{(b. 1855; died 1894)}; Charlie Mumbrue^{(b. 1865; died 1883)}

Henry Cook Mumbrue (February 15, 1828 – April 8, 1898) was an American steamboat operator, businessman, and Wisconsin pioneer. He served in the Wisconsin State Senate (1877–1878) and Assembly (1876), representing Waupaca County. He was at one point the richest resident of Waupaca County, but his riverboat business was wiped out when train lines arrived in the region. His name is often abbreviated as H. C. Mumbrue.

== Background ==
Mumbrue was born in the village of Tyre, New York, on February 15, 1828; he was educated at the Falley Seminary in Fulton, New York. He became a cabinet and chair maker by trade. He came to Wisconsin with his family in 1849, and settled at Winneconne where in 1850 he opened a horse-powered chair factory. He engaged in steamboating for several years on Lake Winnebago and the Fox and Wolf rivers. Mumbrue came to Waupaca County in the 1850s, one of several Mumbrues who settled in the area, and took up farming. In late 1872 he bought an established drug store in the city. Mumbrue continued throughout his subsequent career to explore various forms of business: grist mills, lumber mills, livestock (buying and selling), as well as dry goods and general merchandise. is associated with various firm, including Mumbrue and Dayton; Mumbrue, Baldwin and Co.; Mumbrue and Rosche; Mumbrue and Oertel; and Mumbrue and Woodnorth (a dry goods store in the 1870s). In approximately 1873-1874 he had a house built in the then-popular Second Empire style, but sold in 1878. That two-story house, with a mansard roof, is still standing at 404 S. Main Street in Waupaca.

== Public office ==
He held various municipal offices in Winneconne; in 1854 he was elected clerk of courts for Waupaca County, and held municipal offices in that county as well. He was elected a member of the assembly for 1876 as an "Independent Republican", part of the Reform Party, a short-lived coalition of Democrats, reform and Liberal Republicans, and Grangers formed in 1873. He won 1,083 votes against 784 votes for the incumbent, regular Republican George H. Calkins. He was assigned to the standing committee on lumber and manufactures.

He was elected to the 21st Senate District (Marathon, Portage and Waupaca counties) as a "Liberal Republican" in 1876, succeeding Liberal Democrat Willis Silverthorn (also part of the Reform movement) who was not a candidate for re-election. Mumbrue polled 5,362 votes against 4,990 for former Republican Assemblyman Thomas McDill. He was assigned to the joint committee on claims. The Assembly had been redistricted, and he was succeeded in portions of his old district by Asa L. Baldwin and Hannibal Dixon, both Republicans.

He was not a candidate for re-election in 1878, and was succeeded by Republican John Azor Kellogg.

In 1879 he was elected as an alderman of the City of Waupaca. In 1884, when J. H. Woodnorth (Mumbrue's former partner in dry goods) was appointed register of the United States Land Office at Menasha, Wisconsin, Mumbrue was appointed Woodnorth's deputy, and served four years.

He was confirmed in 1893 (under Democratic President Grover Cleveland, newly returned to office) as postmaster in Waupaca and as of 1896 was in office at a salary of $1,600 per annum., but was replaced after the 1896 presidential election brought McKinley supporters into power by Adelbert Penney, who had bought Mumbrue's old house on Main Street in 1890.
