= Hiram Wilson Sawyer =

19th century American politician (1843–1922)

Hiram W. Sawyer
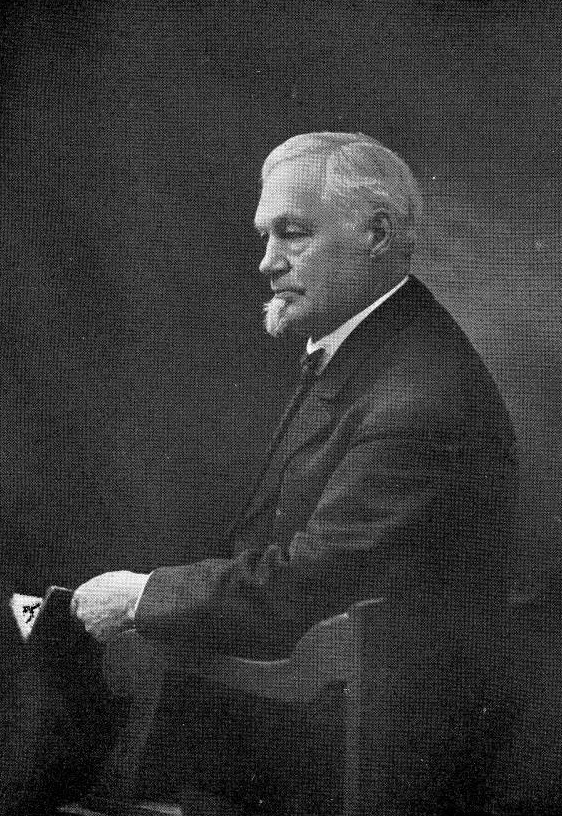
- From Washington County, Wisconsin: Past and Present (1912)

County Judge of Washington County, Wisconsin
- In office January 2, 1882 – January 5, 1903
- Preceded by: John Shelley
- Succeeded by: Patrick O'Meara

1st Mayor of Hartford, Wisconsin
- In office April 1883 – April 1884
- Preceded by: Position established

Member of the Wisconsin State Assembly from the Washington 1st district
- In office January 6, 1873 – January 4, 1875
- Preceded by: Densmore Maxon
- Succeeded by: Andrew Martin

Personal details
- Born: June 11, 1843 North Haverhill, New Hampshire, U.S.
- Died: September 14, 1922 (aged 79)
- Resting place: Pleasant Hill Cemetery, Hartford, Wisconsin
- Party: Democratic
- Spouse: Josephine Bonaparte Coxe (m. 1870–1922)
- Children: Elmo Wilson Sawyer^{(b. 1871; died 1939)}; Hiram Arthur Sawyer^{(b. 1875; died 1946)}; Elsa Amelia Sawyer^{(b. 1878; died 1943)}; Harriet J. Sawyer^{(died 1950)}; Infant child^{(died)}
- Parent: Hiram Sawyer (father)
- Relatives: Hopewell Coxe (father-in-law)
- Education: Wayland University; Read law
- Profession: Lawyer

Hiram Wilson Sawyer (June 11, 1843 – September 14, 1922) was an American lawyer, Democratic politician, and Wisconsin pioneer. He was the first mayor of Hartford, Wisconsin, and was a member of the Wisconsin State Assembly, representing southern Washington County in the 1873 and 1874 sessions. He was also the Democratic nominee for Governor of Wisconsin in 1898, but lost the election.

== Biography ==
Hiram Wilson Sawyer was born June 11, 1843, at North Haverhill, New Hampshire. He came with his parents to the Wisconsin Territory in 1846, settling on a farm in the town of Burnett in Dodge County. He attended the common schools in Dodge County and graduated from the Wayland Academy in Beaver Dam, Wisconsin. He then read law in the offices of Lewis & Fribert in Juneau, Wisconsin, and was admitted to the bar in January 1867.

The following November, he moved to Hartford, Wisconsin, in Washington County, where he established his own law practice. He went on to practice law at Hartford for most of the next 55 years.

He was active in the Democratic Party of Wisconsin, following after his father, and in 1872 he was elected to the Wisconsin State Assembly, representing Washington County's 1st Assembly district—then comprising the southern half of the county. He was re-elected in 1873 and served in the 26th and 27th legislatures. He did not face an opponent in either election in the heavily Democratic district. During these sessions, one of the rare times that Democrats controlled the Wisconsin State Assembly, Sawyer was part of the committee which helped draft their signature railroad regulation bills.

He did not run for a third term in 1874 and focused on his legal career for several years. He returned to office in 1882, after winning the Spring 1881 election for county judge, defeating incumbent John Shelley, who had held the office for over 20 years. Sawyer then went on to serve in the office for another 21 years.

Shortly after he started as judge, the village of Hartford was incorporated as a city, and at the first election for the new city, in 1883, Sawyer was chosen as mayor.

He last stood for election to a partisan office in 1898, when we was the Democratic party's nominee for governor of Wisconsin. He was defeated by incumbent Republican Edward Scofield, taking 41% of the vote. In his later years, he partnered with his sons, Elmo Wilson Sawyer and Hiram Arthur Sawyer, in a law firm known as Sawyer & Sawyer. He also served 35 years as a member of the Hartford school board.

He died at his home in Hartford in September 1922, after a long illness.

== Personal life and family ==
Hiram Wilson Sawyer was the third of twelve children born to Hiram Sawyer and his wife Mary Ann (née Wilson). The elder Sawyer also served in the Wisconsin State Assembly and was a prominent Democrat in Wisconsin during his time.

Hiram Wilson Sawyer married Josephine Coxe on September 28, 1870. Josephine was a daughter of Hopewell Coxe, the first county judge of Washington County and an early member of the State Assembly. Hiram and Josephine had five children together, though one died in infancy. Their son, Hiram Arthur Sawyer, went on to become district attorney of Washington County and United States attorney for the Eastern District of Wisconsin during the presidency of Woodrow Wilson.

Sawyer was also active in Freemasonry.

Party political offices
| Preceded by Willis C. Silverthorn | Democratic nominee for Governor of Wisconsin; 1898 | Succeeded by Louis G. Bomrich |
Wisconsin State Assembly
| Preceded by Densmore Maxon | Member of the Wisconsin State Assembly from the Washington 1st district January 6, 1873 – January 4, 1875 | Succeeded by Andrew Martin |
Political offices
| New city incorporated | Mayor of Hartford, Wisconsin; April 1883 – April 1884 | Succeeded by |
Legal offices
| Preceded by John Shelley | County Judge of Washington County, Wisconsin; January 2, 1882 – January 5, 1903 | Succeeded by Patrick O'Meara |
