= Joseph Morrow =

Joseph Morrow may refer to:

- Joe Morrow (born 1992), Canadian ice hockey defenceman
- Joseph Morrow (officer of arms), Lord Lyon King of Arms & Current Grand Master Mason of the Grand Lodge of Scotland since 2023
- Joseph McKeen Morrow (1832–1899), American lawyer and politician
- Joseph Morrow (hospital administrator) (1886–1962)
