= 1896 Wisconsin gubernatorial election =

- November 3, 1896
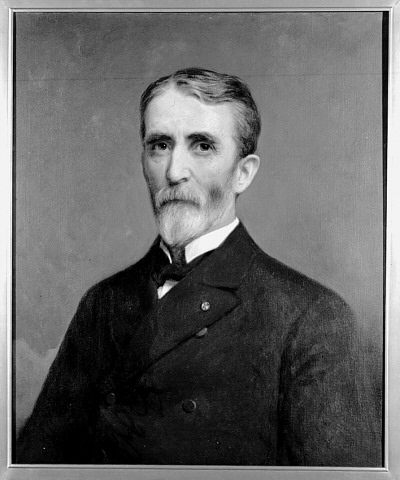

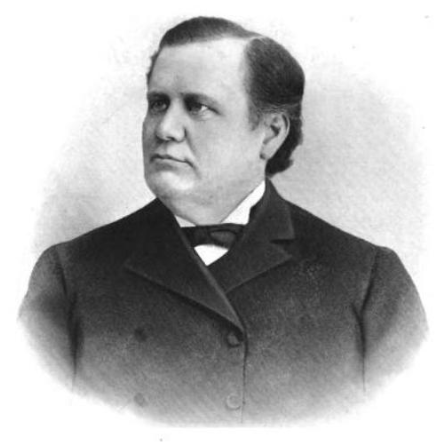
Nominee	Edward Scofield	Willis C. Silverthorn
Party	Republican	Democratic
Popular vote	264,981	169,257
Percentage	59.67%	38.11%
- County results Scofield: 50–60% 60–70% 70–80% 80–90% Silverthorn: 50–60%
Governor before election
William H. Upham
Republican
Elected Governor
Edward Scofield
Republican

The 1896 Wisconsin gubernatorial election was held on November 3, 1896.

Incumbent Republican Governor William H. Upham retired.

Republican nominee Edward Scofield defeated Democratic nominee Willis C. Silverthorn with 59.67% of the vote. Scofield's popular vote share was the highest in the state's history for a gubernatorial candidate to that point, reflecting the state's transition from a Republican-leaning but competitive state to one dominated by the Republicans.

== General election ==
=== Candidates ===
Major party candidates

- Willis C. Silverthorn, Democratic, Democratic nominee for Wisconsin's 8th congressional district in 1880, Democratic nominee for Attorney General of Wisconsin in 1884
- Edward Scofield, Republican, former State Senator

Other candidates

- Joshua H. Berkey, Prohibition, temperance lecturer
- Christ Tuttrop, Socialist Labor
- Robert Henderson, National, Prohibitionist nominee for Wisconsin State Senate in 1892

=== Results ===
1896 Wisconsin gubernatorial election (Note: One must exercise caution using the Blue Book as a source for Wisconsin election data for the period of 1890-1920 as it was unreliable during this period.)
Party	Candidate	Votes	%	±%
Republican	Edward Scofield	264,981	59.67%	+7.42%
Democratic	Willis C. Silverthorn	169,257	38.11%	+0.22%
Prohibition	Joshua H. Berkey	8,144 (Note: The 1897 Blue Book mistakenly gives Berkey's total as 8,140)	1.83%	−1.16%
Socialist Labor	Christ Tuttrop	1,306	0.29%	
National	Robert Henderson	407	0.09%	
	Scattering	15 (Note: The 1897 Blue Book mistakenly gives the Scattering total as 16)	0.00%	
Majority		95,724	21.55%	
Total votes		444,110	100.00%	
Republican hold		Swing	+7.20%	

=== Results by county ===
Scofield was the first Republican to ever win Dodge County, Manitowoc County, and Washington County; Dodge County would not vote Republican again until 1916. Scofield was also the first Republican since 1855 to carry Outagamie County, the first since 1857 to carry Jefferson County, and the first since 1861 to carry Kewaunee County.

County	Edward Scofield Republican		Willis C. Silverthorn Democratic		Joshua H. Berkey Prohibition		Christ Tuttrop Socialist Labor		Robert Henderson National		Margin		Total votes cast
County	#	%	#	%	#	%	#	%	#	%	#	%	Total votes cast
Adams	1,427	77.09%	397	21.45%	27	1.46%	0	0.00%	0	0.00%	1,030	55.65%	1,851
Ashland	2,700	59.18%	1,784	39.11%	59	1.29%	15	0.33%	4	0.09%	916	20.08%	4,562
Barron	2,765	64.88%	1,328	31.16%	165	3.87%	0	0.00%	4	0.09%	1,437	33.72%	4,262
Bayfield	2,224	72.87%	776	25.43%	46	1.51%	5	0.16%	1	0.03%	1,448	47.44%	3,052
Brown	5,324	57.13%	3,870	41.53%	88	0.94%	5	0.05%	32	0.34%	1,454	15.60%	9,319
Buffalo	2,303	62.73%	1,302	35.47%	61	1.66%	1	0.03%	4	0.11%	1,001	27.27%	3,671
Burnett	807	67.59%	355	29.73%	28	2.35%	3	0.25%	1	0.08%	452	37.86%	1,194
Calumet	1,539	44.43%	1,897	54.76%	27	0.78%	1	0.03%	0	0.00%	-358	-10.33%	3,464
Chippewa	3,587	53.95%	2,965	44.59%	89	1.34%	6	0.09%	2	0.03%	622	9.35%	6,649
Clark	3,299	69.38%	1,341	28.20%	100	2.10%	12	0.25%	1	0.02%	1,958	41.18%	4,755 (Note: Includes 2 Scattering votes)
Columbia	4,746	63.04%	2,457	32.64%	308	4.09%	5	0.07%	12	0.16%	2,289	30.41%	7,528
Crawford	2,307	59.49%	1,526	39.35%	41	1.06%	2	0.05%	2	0.05%	781	20.14%	3,878
Dane	8,747	54.34%	6,804	42.27%	518	3.22%	8	0.05%	15	0.09%	1,943	12.07%	16,098 (Note: Includes 6 Scattering votes)
Dodge	5,573	52.02%	5,019	46.85%	108	1.01%	4	0.04%	9	0.08%	554	5.17%	10,713
Door	2,402	71.74%	897	26.79%	48	1.43%	0	0.00%	1	0.03%	1,505	44.95%	3,348
Douglas	4,113	61.29%	2,498	37.22%	87	1.30%	8	0.12%	5	0.07%	1,615	24.06%	6,711
Dunn	3,340	67.89%	1,430	29.07%	143	2.91%	5	0.10%	2	0.04%	1,910	38.82%	4,920
Eau Claire	4,447	62.92%	2,397	33.91%	220	3.11%	1	0.01%	3	0.04%	2,050	29.00%	7,068
Florence	491	79.32%	122	19.71%	5	0.81%	0	0.00%	0	0.00%	369	59.61%	619 (Note: Includes 1 Scattering vote)
Fond du Lac	6,089	53.87%	5,033	44.53%	170	1.50%	7	0.06%	4	0.04%	1,056	9.34%	11,303
Forest	408	68.69%	169	28.45%	15	2.53%	0	0.00%	2	0.34%	239	40.24%	594
Grant	5,281	57.53%	3,685	40.14%	205	2.23%	3	0.03%	6	0.07%	1,596	17.39%	9,180
Green	3,054	54.60%	2,331	41.68%	193	3.45%	11	0.20%	4	0.07%	723	12.93%	5,593
Green Lake	2,091	55.94%	1,581	42.30%	62	1.66%	4	0.11%	0	0.00%	510	13.64%	3,738
Iowa	3,080	56.68%	2,145	39.47%	196	3.61%	2	0.04%	9	0.17%	935	17.21%	5,434
Iron	1,290	71.67%	478	26.56%	30	1.67%	1	0.06%	1	0.06%	812	45.11%	1,800
Jackson	2,707	74.88%	792	21.91%	108	2.99%	2	0.06%	6	0.17%	1,915	52.97%	3,615
Jefferson	4,275	52.76%	3,672	45.32%	150	1.85%	3	0.04%	3	0.04%	603	7.44%	8,103
Juneau	2,805	61.00%	1,714	37.28%	64	1.39%	8	0.17%	7	0.15%	1,091	23.73%	4,598
Kenosha	2,806	60.80%	1,750	37.92%	53	1.15%	5	0.11%	0	0.00%	1,056	22.88%	4,615
Kewaunee	1,812	51.36%	1,702	48.24%	14	0.40%	0	0.00%	0	0.00%	110	3.12%	3,528
La Crosse	6,201	64.36%	3,215	33.37%	204	2.12%	8	0.08%	7	0.07%	2,986	30.99%	9,635
Lafayette	2,910	54.92%	2,265	42.74%	119	2.25%	1	0.02%	4	0.08%	645	12.17%	5,299
Langlade	1,394	57.25%	1,018	41.81%	22	0.90%	1	0.04%	0	0.00%	376	15.44%	2,435
Lincoln	1,675	46.92%	1,849	51.79%	43	1.20%	3	0.08%	0	0.00%	-174	-4.87%	3,570
Manitowoc	4,401	51.87%	3,995	47.09%	65	0.77%	12	0.14%	11	0.13%	406	4.79%	8,484
Marathon	3,668	46.05%	4,198	52.70%	73	0.92%	25	0.31%	2	0.03%	-530	-6.65%	7,966
Marinette	4,358	69.69%	1,808	28.91%	76	1.22%	9	0.14%	2	0.03%	2,550	40.78%	6,253
Marquette	1,475	63.06%	840	35.91%	23	0.98%	0	0.00%	1	0.04%	635	27.15%	2,339
Milwaukee	35,463	55.16%	27,464	42.72%	643	1.00%	679	1.06%	40	0.06%	7,999	12.44%	64,289
Monroe	3,669	59.52%	2,374	38.51%	108	1.75%	1	0.02%	12	0.19%	1,295	21.01%	6,164
Oconto	2,911	68.88%	1,253	29.65%	54	1.28%	5	0.12%	3	0.07%	1,658	39.23%	4,226
Oneida	1,405	68.91%	604	29.62%	30	1.47%	0	0.00%	0	0.00%	801	39.28%	2,039
Outagamie	5,379	55.12%	4,196	43.00%	150	1.54%	8	0.08%	26	0.27%	1,183	12.12%	9,759
Ozaukee	1,546	43.26%	1,988	55.62%	29	0.81%	10	0.28%	1	0.03%	-442	-12.37%	3,574
Pepin	1,295	72.71%	442	24.82%	42	2.36%	1	0.06%	1	0.06%	853	47.89%	1,781
Pierce	3,697	69.75%	1,415	26.70%	182	3.43%	3	0.06%	2	0.04%	2,282	43.06%	5,300
Polk	2,848	74.89%	886	23.30%	65	1.71%	3	0.08%	1	0.03%	1,962	51.59%	3,803
Portage	3,476	53.28%	2,955	45.29%	85	1.30%	2	0.03%	6	0.09%	521	7.99%	6,524
Price	1,444	70.71%	553	27.08%	38	1.86%	6	0.29%	1	0.05%	891	43.63%	2,042
Racine	5,733	56.77%	4,101	40.61%	241	2.39%	5	0.05%	19	0.19%	1,632	16.16%	10,099
Richland	2,635	54.16%	2,088	42.92%	139	2.86%	2	0.04%	1	0.02%	547	11.24%	4,865
Rock	8,224	67.48%	3,657	30.01%	292	2.40%	10	0.08%	4	0.03%	4,567	37.47%	12,187
Sauk	4,594	61.16%	2,637	35.11%	263	3.50%	9	0.12%	8	0.11%	1,957	26.06%	7,511
Sawyer	506	55.97%	371	41.04%	27	2.99%	0	0.00%	0	0.00%	135	14.93%	904
Shawano	3,019	64.34%	1,604	34.19%	55	1.17%	11	0.23%	3	0.06%	1,415	30.16%	4,692
Sheboygan	6,543	62.99%	3,426	32.98%	88	0.85%	313	3.01%	18	0.17%	3,117	30.01%	10,388
St. Croix	3,424	56.13%	2,479	40.64%	187	3.07%	6	0.10%	4	0.07%	945	15.49%	6,100
Taylor	1,355	63.32%	759	35.47%	20	0.93%	2	0.09%	4	0.19%	596	27.85%	2,140
Trempealeau	3,300	67.87%	1,390	28.59%	161	3.31%	5	0.10%	6	0.12%	1,910	39.28%	4,862
Vernon	4,378	71.50%	1,638	26.75%	98	1.60%	3	0.05%	4	0.07%	2,740	44.75%	6,123
Vilas	731	61.02%	459	38.31%	8	0.67%	0	0.00%	0	0.00%	272	22.70%	1,198
Walworth	5,292	70.14%	1,889	25.04%	348	4.61%	3	0.04%	13	0.17%	3,403	45.10%	7,545
Washburn	765	73.42%	253	24.28%	22	2.11%	2	0.19%	0	0.00%	512	49.14%	1,042
Washington	2,833	53.08%	2,461	46.11%	30	0.56%	6	0.11%	7	0.13%	372	6.97%	5,337
Waukesha	5,331	60.61%	3,282	37.32%	177	2.01%	2	0.02%	3	0.03%	2,049	23.30%	8,795
Waupaca	5,456	75.54%	1,593	22.05%	139	1.92%	3	0.04%	32	0.44%	3,863	53.48%	7,223
Waushara	3,207	84.71%	470	12.41%	105	2.77%	0	0.00%	4	0.11%	2,737	72.29%	3,786
Winnebago	7,835	58.97%	5,213	39.24%	213	1.60%	14	0.11%	11	0.08%	2,622	19.74%	13,286
Wood	2,766	57.84%	1,952	40.82%	52	1.09%	6	0.13%	6	0.13%	814	17.02%	4,782
Total	264,981	59.67%	169,257	38.11%	8,144	1.83%	1,306	0.29%	407	0.09%	95,724	21.55%	444,110

==== Counties that flipped from Democratic to Republican ====
- Dodge
- Jefferson
- Kewaunee
- Langlade
- Manitowoc
- Outagamie
- Washington

== Bibliography ==
- Glashan, Roy R. (1979). American Governors and Gubernatorial Elections, 1775-1978. Meckler Books. ISBN 0-930466-17-9.
- Gubernatorial Elections, 1787-1997. Washington, D.C.: Congressional Quarterly Inc. 1998. ISBN 1-56802-396-0.
- Casson, Henry, ed. (1897). The Blue Book of the State of Wisconsin. Milwaukee: The Henry Gugler Company.
