= Perry R. Briggs =

19th-century American politician

Member of the Wisconsin State Assembly from the Juneau district
- In office January 2, 1871 – January 1, 1870
- Preceded by: Jerome B. Potter
- Succeeded by: Henry F. C. Nichols

Personal details
- Born: November 21, 1825 Yates County, New York, U.S.
- Died: September 2, 1918 (aged 92) San Antonio, Texas, U.S.
- Resting place: San Antonio Natl. Cemetery
- Party: Republican
- Spouse: Mary C. Wood (m. 1851–1918)
- Children: Alta A. (Carter)^{(b. 1852; died 1888)}; Bert Wood Briggs^{(b. 1857; died 1922)}
- Profession: Lawyer, banker

Military service
- Allegiance: United States
- Branch/service: United States Volunteers; Union Army
- Years of service: 1864–1865
- Rank: Captain, USV
- Unit: 41st Reg. Wis. Vol. Infantry; 47th Reg. Wis. Vol. Infantry
- Battles/wars: American Civil War

Perry R. Briggs (November 21, 1825 – September 2, 1918) was an American lawyer, banker, and Republican politician. He was a member of the Wisconsin State Assembly, representing Juneau County during the 1871 session. Earlier, he served as district attorney of Juneau County.

== Biography ==
Perry Briggs was born November 21, 1825, in Auburn, New York. As a child, he moved with his parents to Yates County, New York, and then to Buffalo, and Fredonia, where he received two years of academic schooling. As a young man, he went to work in the pail factory at Versailles, New York.

In 1856, Briggs moved west with his family to Juneau County, Wisconsin. They initially settled on a farm near Mauston, but only spent two years conducting the farm. In 1858, he moved into the village of Mauston and began studying law in the office of John Azor Kellogg. He was admitted to the bar in 1860, and in the summer of 1861 he was appointed district attorney after Kellogg resigned that office to enlist in the Union Army. Briggs was subsequently elected to a full term as district attorney, but he too resigned, in May 1864, to enter service in the American Civil War.

Briggs initially signed up for service in one of the "100 day" regiments. He was enrolled as first lieutenant of Company E in the 41st Wisconsin Infantry Regiment. The 41st Wisconsin Infantry served in middle Tennessee and actually saw some combat with Nathan Bedford Forrest's raid on raid on Memphis. At the expiration of their 100-day service, Briggs re-enlisted and was commissioned captain of Company C in the 47th Wisconsin Infantry Regiment. The 47th Wisconsin Infantry also spent most of their short service in Tennessee. Briggs served part of the time on detached duty as an acting judge advocate.

After the war, he served a short time as a pension and bounty agent, and secured 1600 veteran claims. He was appointed postmaster at Mauston by President Andrew Johnson in 1866, and served in that role until his election to the Wisconsin State Assembly in 1870. At that time, his wife was appointed to fulfill the postmaster duties.

He was elected to the Assembly on the Republican ticket, receiving 55% of the vote. He represented all of Juneau County in the 1871 session and did not run for re-election in 1871.

Briggs purchased the ownership of the Bank of Mauston in 1868 and re-opened it in January 1869, acquiring it from its founder and sole-stockholder J. B. Rosencrans. In 1880, he took on his son, Bert, as a partner in the bank, and they opened a branch of the bank in Wonewoc, Wisconsin, which Bert managed. They operated the banks until 1886, when they sold out to Jeff T. Heath.

After selling his stake, Briggs briefly moved to the Dakota Territory, but soon returned to Mauston and opened a new bank—the Juneau County State Bank. After retiring, he moved to Texas.

Briggs died in San Antonio, Texas, in 1918, and was buried at the San Antonio National Cemetery.

== Electoral history ==
=== Wisconsin Assembly (1870) ===
Wisconsin Assembly, Juneau District Election, 1870
Party	Candidate	Votes	%	±%
General Election, November 8, 1870
Republican	Perry R. Briggs	1,124	55.10%	+9.63%
Democratic	Dempster Darrow	916	44.90%	
Plurality		208	10.20%	+1.13%
Total votes		2,040	100.0%	+21.72%
Republican gain from Democratic				

Wisconsin State Assembly
Preceded by Jerome B. Potter	Member of the Wisconsin State Assembly from the Juneau district January 2, 1871 – January 1, 1870	Succeeded by Henry F. C. Nichols
