= Charles V. Bardeen =

19th century American judge

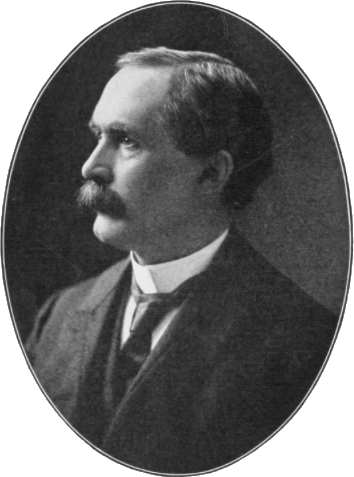

Justice of the Wisconsin Supreme Court
- In office January 25, 1898 – March 20, 1903
- Appointed by: Edward Scofield
- Preceded by: Alfred W. Newman
- Succeeded by: Robert G. Siebecker

Wisconsin Circuit Court Judge for the 16th circuit
- In office January 4, 1892 – January 25, 1898
- Preceded by: Position established
- Succeeded by: Willis C. Silverthorn

Personal details
- Born: September 23, 1850 Brookfield, New York, U.S.
- Died: March 20, 1903 (aged 52) Madison, Wisconsin, U.S.
- Resting place: Forest Hill Cemetery, Madison, Wisconsin
- Spouse: Frances Harmina Miller (m. 1876)
- Children: Bessie, Eleanor, Charles Jr., Florence
- Education: University of Wisconsin Law School
- Profession: Lawyer, judge

Charles Valdo Bardeen Sr. (September 23, 1850 – March 20, 1903) was an American lawyer and judge in the U.S. state of Wisconsin. He was a justice of the Wisconsin Supreme Court from 1898 until his death in 1903. Previously, he served six years as a Wisconsin circuit court judge in north-central Wisconsin and was city attorney for Wausau, Wisconsin.

== Biography ==
Charles V. Bardeen was born in Brookfield, New York, on September 23, 1850. As a child, he moved to a farm in Wisconsin with his family in 1854, where he was raised and educated. He graduated from high school in 1870, then taught school and read law at a law firm in Edgerton, Wisconsin.

In the early 1870s, he was summoned to Colorado by Alva Adams, a friend of his from school who would later become the governor of Colorado. He worked with Adams on a business venture in Colorado Springs, but returned to Wisconsin after about two years.

On his return to Wisconsin, he entered the University of Wisconsin Law School, where he graduated in 1875. He practiced law in Wausau, Wisconsin, served 17 years as city attorney there, and was superintendent of Wausau's public schools.

In 1891, the Wisconsin Legislature created two new circuits of the Wisconsin circuit courts. Bardeen ran for the new 16th circuit judgeship in the Spring 1891 election prevailed with about 61% of the vote. He served six years as circuit judge, and then, in January 1898, he was appointed to the Wisconsin Supreme Court by Governor Edward Scofield. Bardeen replaced Alfred W. Newman, who had died earlier that month. The following April, Bardeen was elected without opposition to finish out the remainder of Newman's judicial term, expiring at the end of 1903.

He died from stomach cancer in Madison, Wisconsin, on March 20, 1903.

== Personal life and family ==
He married Frances Harmina Miller on June 17, 1876, and they had three children.

== Electoral history ==
=== Wisconsin Circuit Court (1891) ===
Wisconsin Circuit Court, 16th Circuit Election, 1891
| Party | Candidate | Votes | % | ±% |
|---|---|---|---|---|
General Election, April 7, 1891
| Nonpartisan | Charles V. Bardeen | 4,624 | 61.13% | |
| Nonpartisan | Elisha L. Bump | 2,940 | 38.87% | |
| Plurality | | 1,684 | 22.26% | |
| Total votes | | 7,564 | 100.0% | |

=== Wisconsin Supreme Court (1898) ===
Wisconsin Supreme Court Election, 1898
| Party | Candidate | Votes | % | ±% |
|---|---|---|---|---|
General Election, April 5, 1898
| Nonpartisan | Charles V. Bardeen (incumbent) | 158,218 | 98.59% | |
| | Scattering | 2,260 | 1.41% | |
| Plurality | | 155,958 | 97.18% | |
| Total votes | | 160,478 | 100.0% | +31.24% |

Legal offices
| New circuit established | Wisconsin Circuit Court Judge for the 16th circuit January 4, 1892 – January 25, 1898 | Succeeded by Willis C. Silverthorn |
| Preceded by Alfred W. Newman | Justice of the Wisconsin Supreme Court; January 25, 1898 – March 20, 1903 | Succeeded by Robert G. Siebecker |
