= 1897 United States Senate election in Wisconsin =

- January 27, 1897
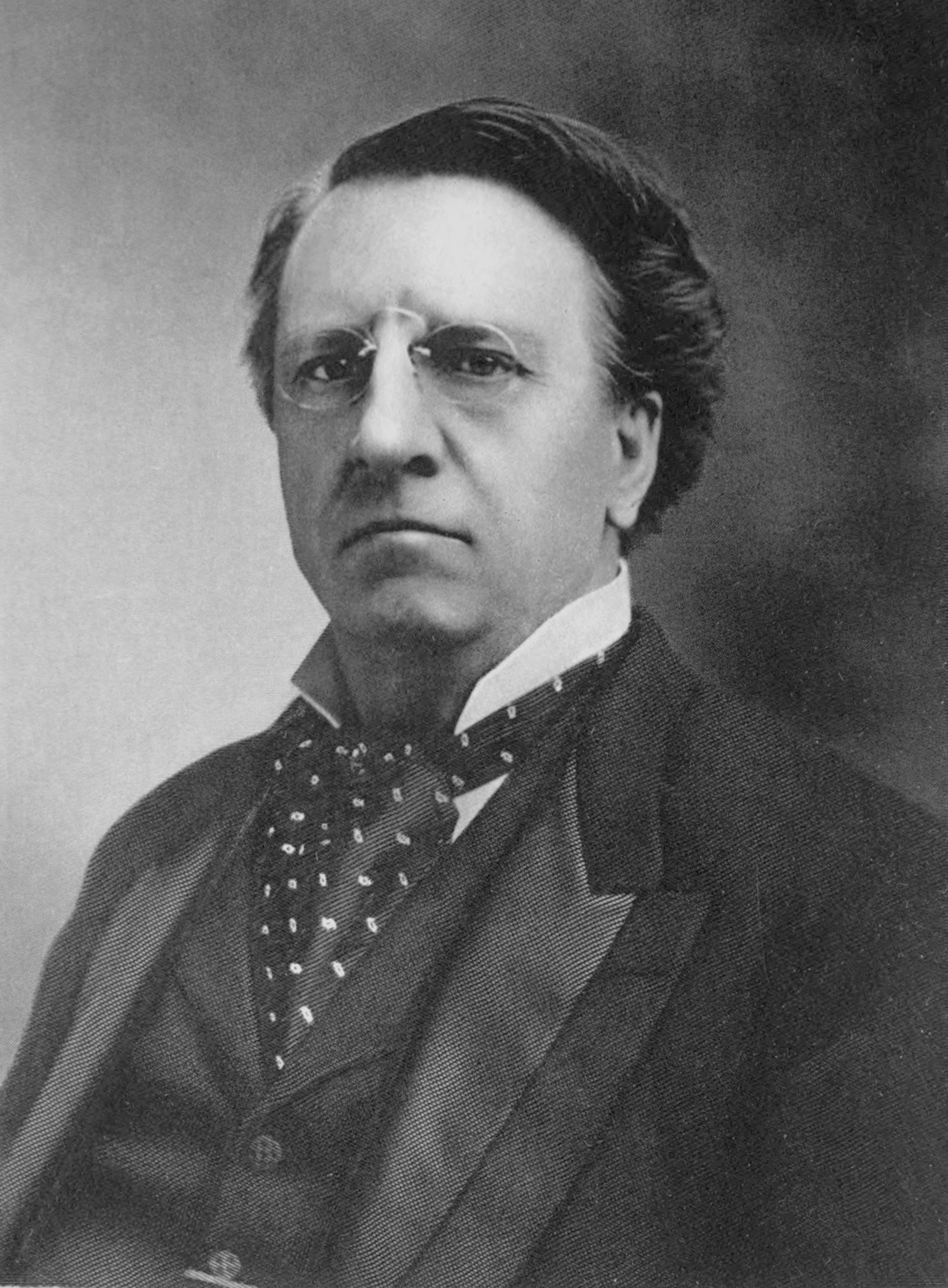

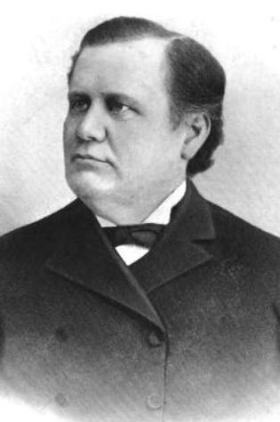

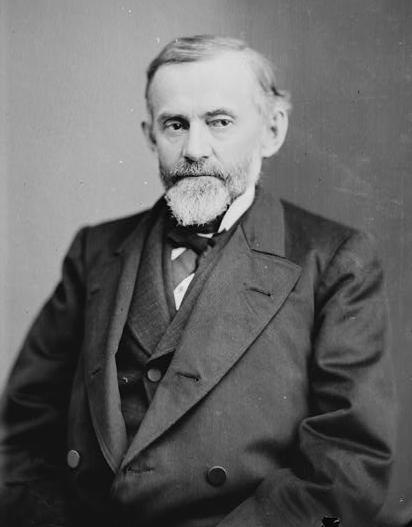
Nominee	John C. Spooner	Willis C. Silverthorn	Edward S. Bragg
Party	Republican	Democratic	National Democratic
Legislative vote	117	8	2
Percentage	92.13%	6.30%	1.57%
U.S. senator before election
William F. Vilas
Democratic
Elected U.S. Senator
John C. Spooner
Republican

The 1897 United States Senate election in Wisconsin was held in the 43rd Wisconsin Legislature on January 27, 1897. Incumbent Democratic U.S. senator William F. Vilas did not run for a second term. His predecessor, Republican former U.S. senator John Coit Spooner was elected to succeed him on the first ballot.

In the 1897 term, Republicans held overwhelming majorities in both chambers of the Wisconsin Legislature, so had more than enough votes to elect a Republican United States senator.

== Major candidates ==
=== Democratic ===
- Willis C. Silverthorn, 1896 Democratic gubernatorial nominee, former state legislator from Wausau, Wisconsin.

=== Republican ===
- John Coit Spooner, former U.S. senator.

=== National Democratic (Gold Democrats) ===
- Edward S. Bragg, former U.S. representative, former U.S. ambassador, former Union Army general.

== Results ==
1st Vote of the 43rd Wisconsin Legislature, January 27, 1897
Party	Candidate	Votes	%
Republican	John Coit Spooner	117	92.13%
Democratic	Willis C. Silverthorn	8	6.30%
National Democratic	Edward S. Bragg	2 (Note: Democratic senators Stephen F. Mayer and Albert Solliday voted for Bragg.)	1.57%
	Absent or not voting	6	
Majority		64	50.39%
Total votes		127	95.49%
Republican gain from Democratic			
