= New Bridge Medical Center =

Coordinates: 40.956442°N 74.062477°W

Bergen New Bridge Medical Center

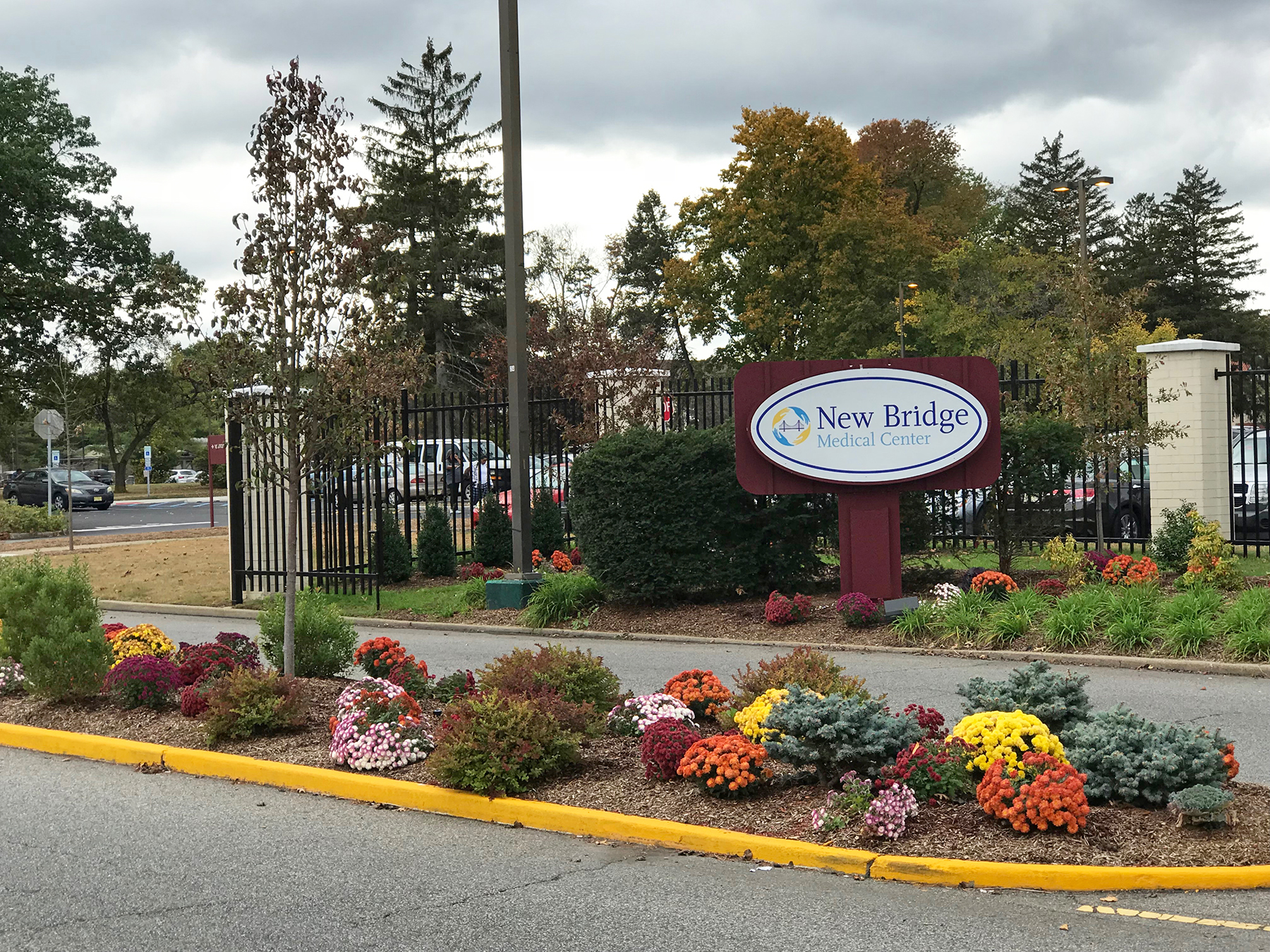
- The entrance to Bergen New Bridge Medical Center

Geography
- Location: 230 East Ridgewood Avenue, Paramus, NJ, United States

Organization
- Type: Community

Links
- Lists: Hospitals in the United States

Bergen New Bridge Medical Center (previously known as Bergen Regional Medical Center) is an acute and long-term care hospital located in Paramus, New Jersey, US. With 939 beds, it is the largest hospital in the state and fourth largest publicly owned hospital in the United States of America. The hospital campus also houses a nursing home and a mental health facility. It has been ranked a top hospital by Jersey's Best Magazine using rankings from Castle Connolly Medical.

== History ==
The facility first opened in 1916 as the Bergen County Isolation Hospital, housing patients with tuberculosis and other contagious diseases. It later became known as Bergen Pines, inspired by the planting of more than 1,000 young pine trees donated in 1924 by Hackensack's Pioneer Masonic Lodge. It continued to be an isolation hospital for 8 years. Its first superintendent was Joseph Morrow, a native of Arkansas who spearheaded its organization and helped grow the hospital into one of the finest facilities of its kind in the country.

In 1966, the hospital was reported to host pastoral visits from Lutheran, Methodist, and Baptist clergy sponsored by the Bergen County Council of Churches.

In 1998, Bergen County transferred the hospital to the Bergen County Improvement Authority, which privatized it by leasing the facility to the Solomon Health Group, forming Bergen Regional Medical Center. In 2005, the county and Solomon Health Group were sued by Citizen Action which alleged $33 million in loans from the county to the company were misused.

In 2017, the hospital transitioned to being run as a nonprofit as Care Plus Bergen in conjunction with Rutgers NJMS. During the COVID-19 pandemic, the Army Corps of Engineers built two facilities totaling 13,450-square-foot on the campus to expand capacity as Bergen County was one of the hardest hit in the United States. The facilities were later used as a vaccination center.
