= Alfred Newman (judge) =

American lawyer, politician, and judge

The Honorable Alfred W. Newman
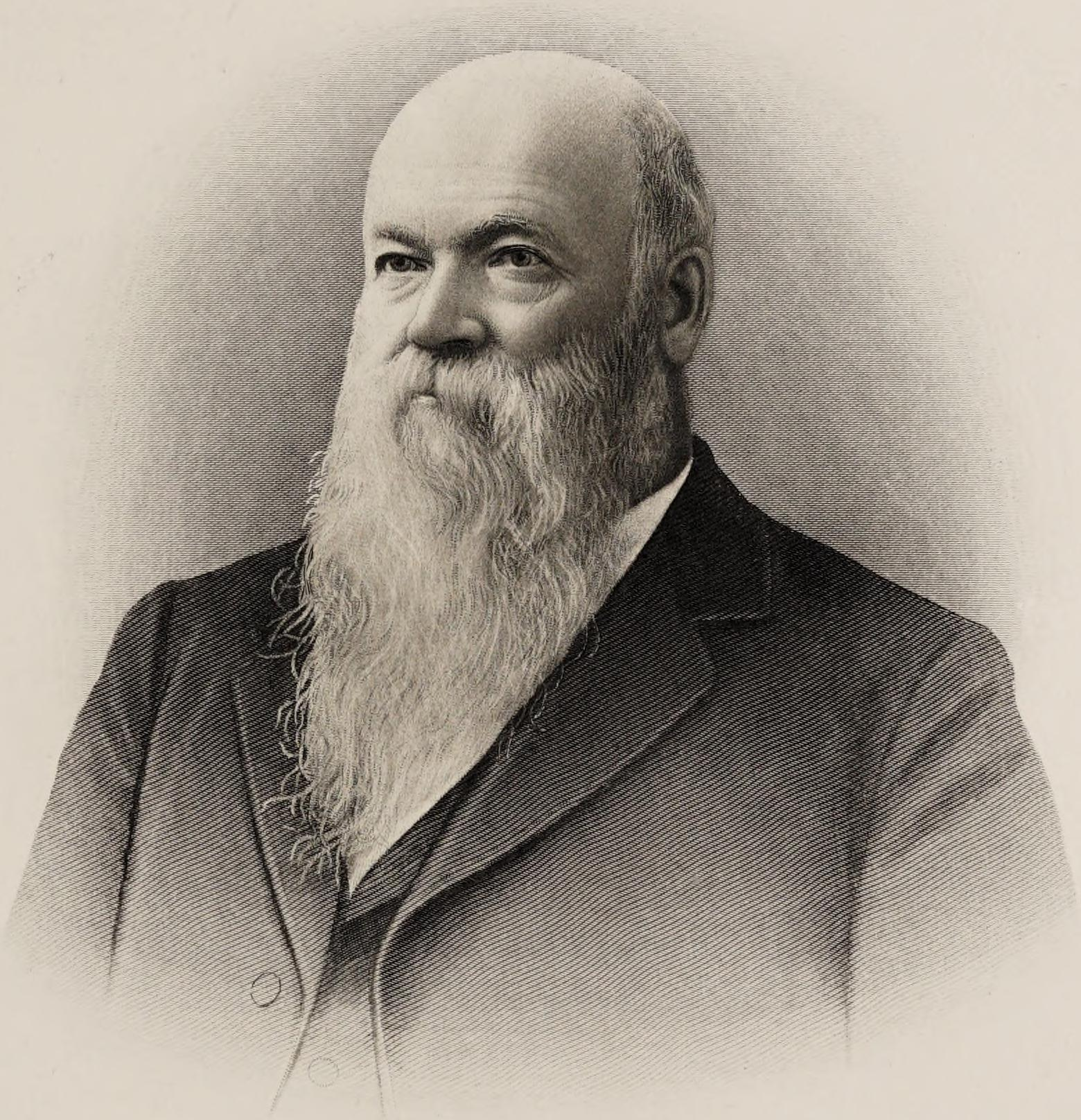

Justice of the Wisconsin Supreme Court
- In office January 1, 1894 – January 11, 1898
- Preceded by: William P. Lyon
- Succeeded by: Charles V. Bardeen

Wisconsin Circuit Court Judge for the 6th Circuit
- In office January 1, 1878 – January 1, 1894
- Preceded by: Romanzo Bunn
- Succeeded by: Joseph McKeen Morrow

Wisconsin Circuit Court Judge for the 13th Circuit
- In office January 1, 1877 – January 1, 1878
- Preceded by: Position established
- Succeeded by: A. Scott Sloan

Member of the Wisconsin Senate from the 32nd district
- In office January 1, 1868 – January 1, 1870
- Preceded by: Joseph G. Thorp
- Succeeded by: William T. Price

Member of the Wisconsin State Assembly from the Buffalo–Pepin–Trempealeau district
- In office January 1, 1863 – January 1, 1864
- Preceded by: Orlando Brown
- Succeeded by: Fayette Allen

Personal details
- Born: Alfred William Newman; April 5, 1834 Durham, New York, U.S.
- Died: January 11, 1898 (aged 63)
- Resting place: Trempealeau Cemetery; Trempealeau, Wisconsin
- Children: May (Heuston)^{(b. 1862; died 1940)}
- Education: Hamilton College

Alfred William Newman (April 5, 1834 – January 11, 1898) was an American lawyer, judge, and politician in Wisconsin. He was a justice of the Wisconsin Supreme Court for the last four years of his life, after fifteen years as a Wisconsin Circuit Court Judge. Earlier in his career he served in the Wisconsin State Senate and Wisconsin State Assembly.

== Biography ==
Born in Durham, New York, Newman graduated from Hamilton College in 1857. After studying law he was admitted to the New York Bar. In 1858, he moved to Trempealeau County, Wisconsin, where he was elected judge and then district attorney. In 1863, Newman served in the Wisconsin State Assembly and in 1868–1869, served in the Wisconsin State Senate. In 1876, Newman was elected judge of the Wisconsin Circuit Court for the newly created 13th Circuit. The next year, however, the circuits were redrawn and he became Judge of the 6th Circuit. He remained judge of the 6th Circuit until 1894, when he began his term on the Wisconsin Supreme Court, where he served until his death.

== Electoral history ==
Wisconsin Supreme Court Election, 1893
Party	Candidate	Votes	%	±%
General Election, April 7, 1893
Nonpartisan	Alfred W. Newman	123,476	61.93%	
Nonpartisan	Charles M. Webb	73,803	37.02%	
	Scattering	2,092	1.05%	
Total votes		'199,371'	'100.0%'	

== Notes ==
Legal offices
Preceded by New circuit	Wisconsin Circuit Court Judge for the 13th Circuit; 1877 – 1878	Succeeded by A. Scott Sloan
Preceded by Romanzo Bunn	Wisconsin Circuit Court Judge for the 6th Circuit; 1878 – 1894	Succeeded by Joseph McKeen Morrow
Preceded by William P. Lyon	Justice of the Wisconsin Supreme Court; 1894 – 1898	Succeeded by Charles V. Bardeen
