= 1898 Wisconsin gubernatorial election =

- November 8, 1898
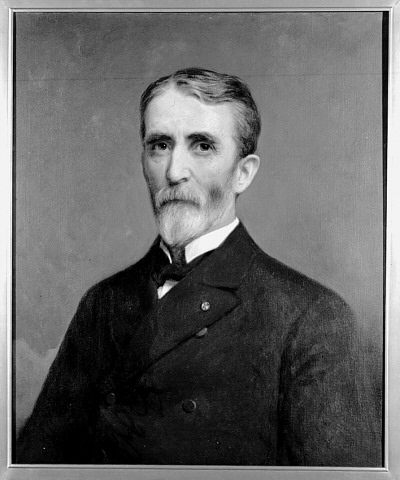

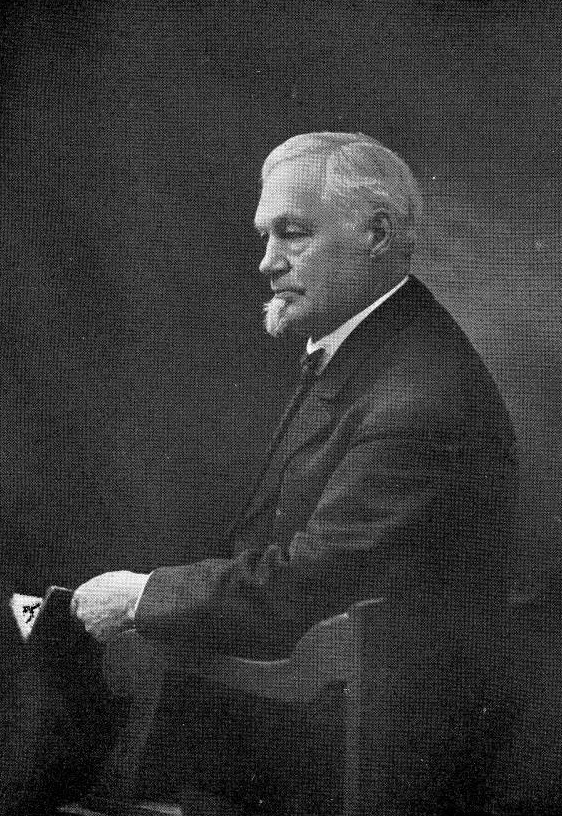
Nominee	Edward Scofield	Hiram Wilson Sawyer
Party	Republican	Democratic
Popular vote	173,137	135,353
Percentage	52.56%	41.09%
- County results Scofield : 40–50% 50–60% 60–70% 70–80% Sawyer : 40–50% 50–60% 60–70%
Governor before election
Edward Scofield
Republican
Elected Governor
Edward Scofield
Republican

The 1898 Wisconsin gubernatorial election was held on November 8, 1898.

Incumbent Republican Governor Edward Scofield defeated Democratic nominee Hiram Wilson Sawyer with 52.55% of the vote.

== General election ==
=== Candidates ===
Major party candidates

- Hiram Wilson Sawyer, Democratic, lawyer
- Edward Scofield, Republican, incumbent Governor

Other candidates

- Albinus A. Worsley, People's, farmer
- Eugene W. Chafin, Prohibition, Prohibition nominee for Wisconsin's 2nd congressional district in 1882
- Howard Tuttle, Social Democrat, scenic artist
- Henry Riese, Socialist Labor, farmer

=== Results ===
1898 Wisconsin gubernatorial election (Note: One must exercise caution using the Blue Book as a source for Wisconsin election data for the period of 1890-1920 as it was unreliable during this period.)
Party	Candidate	Votes	%	±%
Republican	Edward Scofield (incumbent)	173,137	52.56%	−7.11%
Democratic	Hiram Wilson Sawyer	135,353	41.09%	+2.98%
Populist	Albinus A. Worsley	8,518	2.59%	
Prohibition	Eugene W. Chafin	8,078 (Note: The 1899 Blue Book mistakenly gives this total as 8,088)	2.45%	+0.62%
Social Democratic	Howard Tuttle	2,544	0.77%	
Socialist Labor	Henry Riese	1,473	0.45%	+0.15%
	Scattering	150 (Note: 112 of these votes were for Robert M. La Follette)	0.05%	
	Blank	177	0.05%	
Majority		37,784	11.47%	
Total votes		329,430	100.00%	
Republican hold		Swing	-10.08%	

=== Results by county ===
Scofield was the first Republican to ever win Marathon County. After this election, Lincoln County and Wood County would not vote Democratic again until 1932 and those counties would also not vote for the losing candidate again until 1940.

County	Edward Scofield Republican		Hiram Wilson Sawyer Democratic		Albinus A. Worsley Populist		Eugene W. Chafin Prohibition		Howard Tuttle Social Democratic		Henry Riese Socialist Labor		Margin		Total votes cast (Note: These totals include any Scattering votes in each county)
County	#	%	#	%	#	%	#	%	#	%	#	%	#	%	Total votes cast
Adams	1,055	68.82%	420	27.40%	17	1.11%	27	1.76%	7	0.46%	2	0.13%	635	41.42%	1,533
Ashland	1,703	54.78%	1,252	40.27%	46	1.48%	75	2.41%	8	0.26%	25	0.80%	451	14.51%	3,109
Barron	1,660	64.57%	675	26.25%	118	4.59%	106	4.12%	3	0.12%	6	0.23%	985	38.31%	2.571
Bayfield	1,235	60.36%	697	34.07%	28	1.37%	68	3.32%	6	0.29%	10	0.49%	538	26.30%	2,046
Brown	3,476	52.48%	2,929	44.22%	65	0.98%	121	1.83%	13	0.20%	19	0.29%	547	8.26%	6,623
Buffalo	1,640	59.44%	1,011	36.64%	47	1.70%	51	1.85%	6	0.22%	4	0.14%	629	22.80%	2,759
Burnett	703	72.77%	54	5.59%	136	14.08%	56	5.80%	3	0.31%	12	1.24%	567 (Note: Scofield's margin over Worsley)	58.69%	966
Calumet	1,370	47.24%	1.411	48.66%	65	2.24%	30	1.03%	10	0.34%	8	0.28%	-41	-1.41%	2,900
Chippewa	2,273	49.35%	2,150	46.68%	55	1.19%	120	2.61%	3	0.07%	4	0.09%	123	2.67%	4,606
Clark	2,048	65.31%	948	30.23%	36	1.15%	95	3.03%	4	0.13%	5	0.16%	1,100	35.08%	3,136
Columbia	3,526	59.29%	2,143	36.03%	51	0.86%	208	3.50%	12	0.20%	4	0.07%	1,383	23.26%	5,947
Crawford	1,720	55.00%	1,305	41.73%	44	1.41%	52	1.66%	3	0.10%	2	0.06%	415	13.27%	3,127
Dane	5,461	44.08%	6,276	50.65%	76	0.61%	496	4.00%	31	0.25%	14	0.11%	-815	-6.58%	12,390
Dodge	3,534	38.78%	5,384	59.08%	53	0.58%	122	1.34%	12	0.13%	4	0.04%	-1,850	-20.30%	9,113
Door	1,571	68.13%	648	28.10%	32	1.39%	43	1.86%	5	0.22%	4	0.17%	923	40.03%	2,306
Douglas	2,862	60.38%	1,578	33.29%	70	1.48%	182	3.84%	17	0.36%	31	0.65%	1,284	27.09%	4,740
Dunn	1,527	53.62%	1,022	35.88%	152	5.34%	127	4.46%	7	0.25%	7	0.25%	505	17.73%	2,848
Eau Claire	2,648	56.32%	1,850	39.34%	42	0.89%	133	2.83%	22	0.47%	7	0.15%	798	16.97%	4,702
Florence	297	68.12%	120	27.52%	10	2.29%	6	1.38%	2	0.46%	1	0.23%	177	40.60%	436
Fond du Lac	4,201	47.91%	4,194	47.83%	114	1.30%	235	2.68%	17	0.19%	7	0.08%	7	0.08%	8,768
Forest	185	56.40%	132	40.24%	3	0.91%	7	2.13%	1	0.30%	0	0.00%	53	16.16%	328
Grant	4,094	56.06%	2,947	40.35%	49	0.67%	188	2.57%	15	0.21%	6	0.08%	1,147	15.71%	7,303
Green	2,042	53.58%	1,448	38.00%	168	4.41%	129	3.38%	15	0.39%	5	0.13%	594	15.59%	3,811
Green Lake	1,914	51.31%	1,682	45.09%	51	1.37%	65	1.74%	6	0.16%	12	0.32%	232	6.22%	3,730
Iowa	2,285	51.65%	1,848	41.77%	33	0.75%	243	5.49%	7	0.16%	5	0.11%	437	9.88%	4,424
Iron	696	58.10%	473	39.48%	7	0.58%	16	1.34%	5	0.42%	1	0.08%	223	18.61%	1,198
Jackson	1,575	67.95%	639	27.57%	19	0.82%	78	3.36%	2	0.09%	0	0.00%	936	40.38%	2,318
Jefferson	2,750	41.88%	3,606	54.91%	46	0.70%	146	2.22%	11	0.17%	8	0.12%	-856	-13.03%	6,567
Juneau	2,203	55.28%	1,661	41.68%	43	1.08%	69	1.73%	5	0.13%	3	0.08%	542	13.60%	3,985
Kenosha	2,027	49.78%	1,674	41.11%	128	3.14%	56	1.38%	3	0.07%	6	0.15%	353	8.67%	4,072 (Note: Also includes all 177 of the Blank votes)
Kewaunee	1,239	41.66%	1,682	56.56%	23	0.77%	22	0.74%	2	0.07%	6	0.20%	-443	-14.90%	2,974
La Crosse	3,864	59.57%	2,358	36.35%	74	1.14%	173	2.67%	10	0.15%	6	0.09%	1,506	23.22%	6,487
Lafayette	2,228	51.19%	1,982	45.54%	27	0.62%	109	2.50%	1	0.02%	3	0.07%	246	5.65%	4,352
Langlade	868	42.84%	1,102	54.39%	20	0.99%	25	1.23%	3	0.15%	8	0.39%	-234	-11.55%	2,026
Lincoln	1,132	42.91%	1,327	50.30%	108	4.09%	57	2.16%	10	0.38%	4	0.15%	-195	-7.39%	2,638
Manitowoc	3,265	45.52%	3,707	51.68%	58	0.81%	58	0.81%	68	0.95%	17	0.24%	-442	-6.16%	7,173
Marathon	3,068	49.62%	2,765	44.72%	269	4.35%	57	0.92%	10	0.16%	14	0.23%	303	4.90%	6,183
Marinette	3,062	66.21%	1,397	30.21%	41	0.89%	105	2.27%	13	0.28%	7	0.15%	1,665	36.00%	4,625
Marquette	1,210	57.89%	840	40.19%	10	0.48%	24	1.15%	3	0.14%	3	0.14%	370	17.70%	2,090
Milwaukee	20,233	44.64%	19,484	42.99%	2,651	5.85%	539	1.19%	1,633	3.60%	779	1.72%	749	1.65%	45,323
Monroe	2,691	56.76%	1,848	38.98%	44	0.93%	151	3.18%	5	0.11%	2	0.04%	843	17.78%	4,741
Oconto	1,945	60.31%	1,157	35.88%	50	1.55%	53	1.64%	10	0.31%	10	0.31%	788	24.43%	3,225
Oneida	1,095	58.49%	708	37.82%	19	1.01%	38	2.03%	7	0.37%	5	0.27%	387	20.67%	1,872
Outagamie	3,784	53.31%	3,074	43.31%	54	0.76%	159	2.24%	6	0.08%	21	0.30%	710	10.00%	7,098
Ozaukee	857	35.31%	1,504	61.97%	48	1.98%	6	0.25%	7	0.29%	5	0.21%	-647	-26.66%	2,427
Pepin	865	64.84%	433	32.46%	6	0.45%	29	2.17%	0	0.00%	1	0.07%	432	32.38%	1,334
Pierce	1,771	67.72%	621	23.75%	93	3.56%	122	4.67%	1	0.04%	4	0.15%	1,150	43.98%	2,615
Polk	1,822	74.55%	384	15.71%	135	5.52%	66	2.70%	12	0.49%	22	0.90%	1,438	58.84%	2,444
Portage	2,219	49.25%	2,137	47.43%	35	0.78%	96	2.13%	7	0.16%	10	0.22%	82	1.82%	4,506
Price	951	58.63%	515	31.75%	13	0.80%	98	6.04%	12	0.74%	33	2.03%	436	26.88%	1,622
Racine	3,846	48.97%	2,850	36.29%	926	11.79%	197	2.51%	16	0.20%	19	0.24%	996	12.68%	7,854
Richland	1,852	51.56%	1,430	39.81%	121	3.37%	178	4.96%	1	0.03%	7	0.19%	422	11.75%	3,592
Rock	5,427	63.65%	2,676	31.39%	101	1.18%	293	3.44%	11	0.13%	11	0.13%	2,751	32.27%	8,526
Sauk	2,671	54.01%	1,999	40.42%	32	0.65%	230	4.65%	5	0.10%	7	0.14%	672	13.59%	4,945
Sawyer	547	57.52%	355	37.33%	11	1.16%	31	3.26%	5	0.53%	2	0.21%	192	20.19%	951
Shawano	1,863	54.36%	1,451	42.34%	62	1.81%	36	1.05%	3	0.09%	11	0.32%	412	12.02%	3,427
Sheboygan	4,137	51.65%	3,203	39.99%	210	2.62%	66	0.82%	293	3.66%	89	1.11%	934	11.66%	8,010
St. Croix	2,111	54.21%	1,481	38.03%	119	3.06%	168	4.31%	5	0.13%	7	0.18%	630	16.18%	3,894
Taylor	869	46.52%	921	49.30%	34	1.82%	30	1.61%	7	0.37%	7	0.37%	-52	-2.78%	1,868
Trempealeau	1,994	66.29%	827	27.49%	32	1.06%	135	4.49%	10	0.33%	4	0.13%	1,167	38.80%	3,008
Vernon	2,440	64.88%	1,111	29.54%	76	2.02%	112 (Note: The Blue Book mistakenly gives this figure as 122)	2.98%	7	0.19%	6	0.16%	1,329	35.34%	3,761
Vilas	695	52.53%	587	44.37%	14	1.06%	13	0.98%	9	0.68%	5	0.38%	108	8.16%	1,323
Walworth	3,352	66.96%	1,313	26.23%	46	0.92%	283	5.65%	9	0.18%	3	0.06%	2,039	40.73%	5,006
Washburn	598	67.19%	244	27.42%	23	2.58%	21	2.36%	1	0.11%	3	0.34%	354	39.78%	890
Washington	2,094	44.22%	2,583	54.55%	24	0.51%	26	0.55%	3	0.06%	5	0.11%	-489	-10.33%	4,735
Waukesha	3,669	50.61%	3,221	44.43%	50	0.69%	288	3.97%	13	0.18%	9	0.12%	448	6.18%	7,250
Waupaca	3,274	69.73%	1,189	25.32%	41	0.87%	175	3.73%	7	0.15%	7	0.15%	2,085	44.41%	4,695
Waushara	2,340	79.62%	389	13.24%	88	2.99%	98	3.33%	6	0.20%	18	0.61%	1,951	66.38%	2,939
Winnebago	5,293	47.96%	4,471	40.51%	875	7.93%	301	2.73%	40	0.36%	56	0.51%	822	7.45%	11,036
Wood	1,615	44.82%	1,850	51.35%	51	1.42%	60	1.67%	12	0.33%	15	0.42%	-235	-6.52%	3,603
Total	173,137	52.56%	135,353	41.09%	8,518	2.59%	8,078	2.45%	2,544	0.77%	1,473	0.45%	37,784	11.47%	329,430

==== Counties that flipped from Democratic to Republican ====
- Marathon

==== Counties that flipped from Republican to Democratic ====
- Dane
- Dodge
- Jefferson
- Kewaunee
- Langlade
- Manitowoc
- Taylor
- Washington
- Wood

== Bibliography ==
- Glashan, Roy R. (1979). American Governors and Gubernatorial Elections, 1775-1978. Meckler Books. ISBN 0-930466-17-9.
- Gubernatorial Elections, 1787-1997. Washington, D.C.: Congressional Quarterly Inc. 1998. ISBN 1-56802-396-0.
- Froehlich, Wm. H., ed. (1899). The Blue Book of the State of Wisconsin. Milwaukee: Northwestern Litho. Co.
