= George B. Goodwin =

American politician

George Benjamin Goodwin (December 18, 1834 – May 1, 1886) was an American lawyer who served one term in the Wisconsin State Assembly as a Republican while living in Menasha in 1860.

== Background ==
Goodwin was born on December 18, 1834, in Livingston County, New York, the second child of Simeon S. Goodwin and Elizabeth (Albright) Goodwin. His father was a blacksmith who later went into carriagemaking on a large scale. He attended common school in Mount Morris, New York, then after preparatory study entered Genesee College in the winter of 1851, and remained until 1854, when, owing to a clash within the faculty, he and several fellow students withdrew and entered the senior class at Williams College in Massachusetts, at that time run by Mark Hopkins. At the end of one term, the trouble at Genesee College having been settled, he and some others returned and graduated in the fall of 1854. He taught at a district school at Cuylerville, New York for a year, then entered the Albany Law School, and in the winter of that year was admitted to practice. In the spring of 1856 he married Harriet C. Decker, of Lima, New York, and with money barely sufficient to defray their traveling expenses, removed to the West, settling in May 1856 in Menasha.

== Politics and public life ==
He helped organize the first Republican club of Menasha, and took an active part in the presidential election of 1856, stumping for John C. Fremont. In 1859 he was elected to represent the northern Assembly district of Winnebago County. He was chairman of the standing committee on printing.

After the outbreak of the American Civil War, in 1862, he helped organize the 2nd Regiment Wisconsin Volunteers, which eventually became the 41st Wisconsin Volunteer Infantry Regiment, and served as a colonel in it.

After the war he moved to Milwaukee, where he was an assessor of internal revenue for the United States government. He was a candidate for Congressman as the nominee of the Trades Assembly in 1882.

He died from complications of diabetes on May 1, 1886, in Milwaukee.
