= John Azor Kellogg =

19th century American politician and Union Army officer

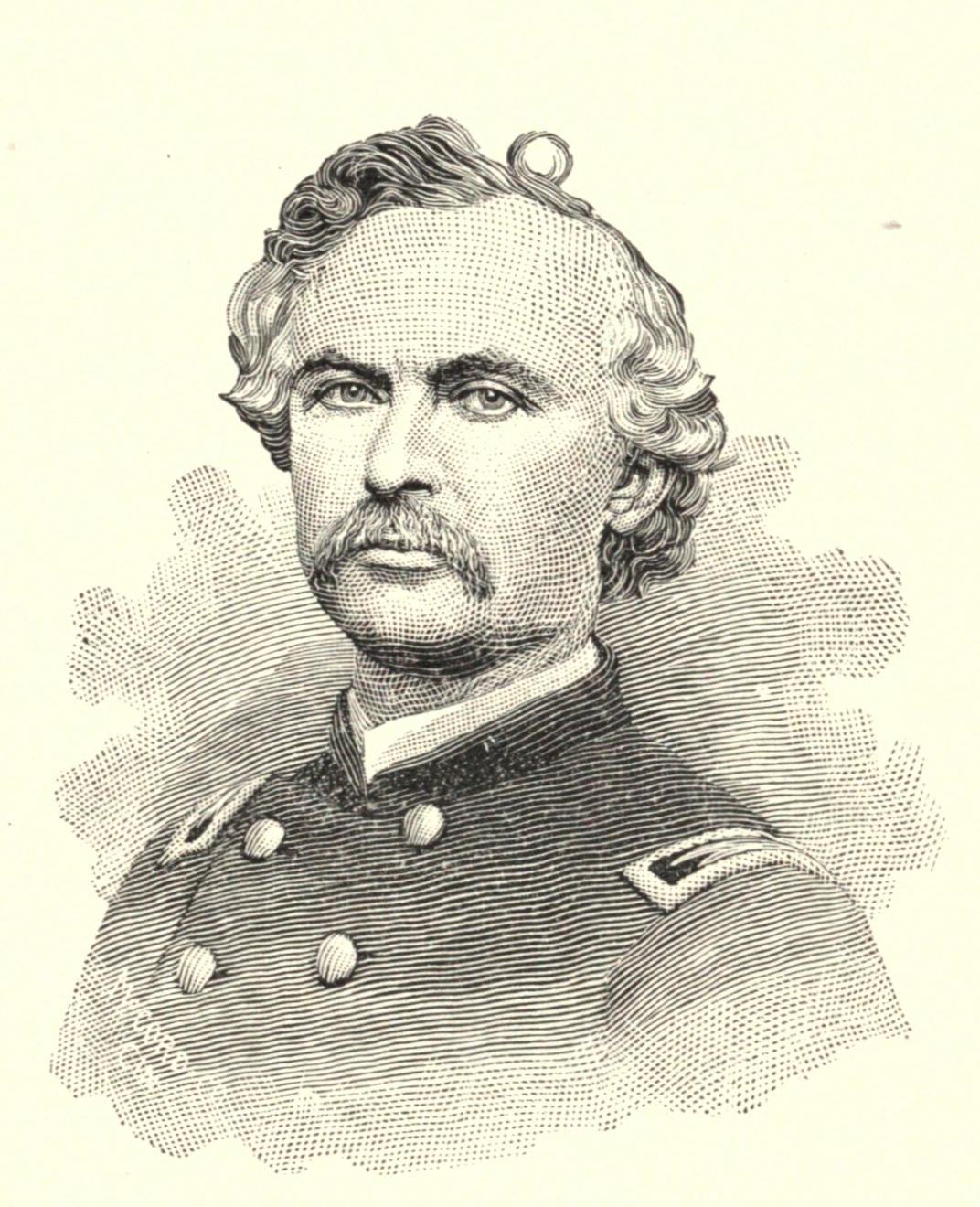

Member of the Wisconsin Senate from the 21st district
- In office January 6, 1879 – January 3, 1881
- Preceded by: Henry Mumbrue
- Succeeded by: Charles F. Crosby

District Attorney of Juneau County, Wisconsin
- In office January 1, 1861 – April 1861
- Preceded by: Richard Smith
- Succeeded by: Perry R. Briggs

Personal details
- Born: March 16, 1828 Bethany, Pennsylvania, US
- Died: February 10, 1883 (aged 54) Wausau, Wisconsin, US
- Resting place: Pine Grove Cemetery, Wausau (original); Maple Lawn Cemetery, Faribault, Minnesota (re-interred)
- Party: Republican
- Spouse: Adelaide Worthington
- Children: 5
- Education: University of Wisconsin–Madison
- Profession: Lawyer

Military service
- Allegiance: United States
- Branch/service: United States Volunteers; Union Army
- Years of service: 1861–1865
- Rank: Colonel, USV; Brevet Brig. General, USV
- Unit: Army of the Potomac
- Commands: 6th Reg. Wis. Vol. Infantry; Iron Brigade
- Battles/wars: American Civil War; Northern Virginia Campaign; First Battle of Rappahannock Station; Second Battle of Bull Run; Maryland campaign; Battle of South Mountain; Battle of Antietam; Fredericksburg campaign; Battle of Fredericksburg; Mud March; Battle of Chancellorsville; Battle of Mine Run; Battle of Gettysburg; Battle of the Wilderness; Richmond–Petersburg campaign; Battle of Boydton Plank Road; Battle of Hatcher's Run; Appomattox campaign; Battle of Five Forks; Battle of High Bridge; Battle of Appomattox Court House

John Azor Kellogg (March 16, 1828 – February 10, 1883) was an American lawyer, Republican politician, and Wisconsin pioneer. He served as a Union Army officer through the entire American Civil War, serving with the famed Iron Brigade of the Army of the Potomac; he received an honorary brevet to brigadier general after the war. He was a prisoner of war for several months in 1864, and later wrote an account of his escape from captivity and his war service, called Capture and Escape: A Narrative of Army and Prison Life. He later served in the Wisconsin Senate, representing the 21st Senate district from 1879 to 1881.

== Early life ==
Born in Bethany, Pennsylvania, Kellogg moved with his parents to Prairie du Sac, in the Wisconsin Territory, in 1840. At age 18, he began studying law at Madison, Wisconsin. In 1857, he was admitted to the State Bar of Wisconsin and moved to Mauston, Wisconsin, in Juneau County. He was elected district attorney for Juneau County in 1860, but resigned in April 1861 to enter service with the Union Army in the American Civil War.

== Civil War service ==
At the outbreak of the American Civil War, Kellogg worked with Rufus Dawes to raise a company of volunteers, known as the "Lemonweir Minute Men", from Mauston and the surrounding areas of Juneau County. Dawes was elected captain with Kellogg as first lieutenant; their company was incorporated into the 6th Wisconsin Infantry Regiment and organized as Company K of that regiment on May 3, 1861. Upon their arrival in Washington, D.C., the regiment was organized into a brigade along with three other regiments from Wisconsin and Indiana. Their brigade later became known as the Iron Brigade, and was attached to the Army of the Potomac for most of the war.

Kellogg was promoted to captain of Company I in December 1861, and was made an adjutant for the brigade in 1863. He returned to his role with the regiment in 1864.

Kellogg was wounded on May 5, 1864, during the Battle of the Wilderness, and was initially reported dead. He had actually been taken prisoner. He was held in Virginia for a time, then transferred to Georgia. He escaped while en route to Charleston, South Carolina, but was pursued and recaptured. On October 15, while being transferred from Charleston to Columbia, South Carolina, Kellogg escaped again. This time he successfully reached Union forces near Calhoun, Georgia, having traveled 350 miles after his escape.

While a prisoner of war, Kellogg had been promoted to major and then lieutenant colonel. In December 1864, he was made colonel of the 6th Wisconsin Infantry Regiment, following the resignation of Rufus Dawes. On February 28, 1865, Kellogg was placed in command of the Iron Brigade. He commanded the brigade through the Appomattox Campaign at the close of the war and mustered out in August 1865. He was subsequently awarded an honorary brevet to brigadier general in recognition of his service.

== Postbellum years ==
After the war, Kellogg moved to La Crosse, Wisconsin, and served as a U.S. Pension Agent in La Crosse from 1866 to 1875. In 1875, Kellogg moved with his family to Wausau, Wisconsin, and resumed practicing law. Kellogg remained active with the Republican Party throughout his life, and, in 1878, was elected to the Wisconsin Senate, defeating Democrat M. H. Wadleigh. Politically, Kellogg was described as a Radical Republican.

Kellogg died of a heart attack in February 1883, at age 54. He was buried in Wausau, but later his body was re-interred in Faribault, Minnesota, where his eldest daughter, Ida, was then residing.

== Personal life and family ==
In 1852, Kellogg married Adelaide Worthington of Prairie du Sac. They had five children, but at least one died in childhood.

== Published works ==
Kellogg published articles about his involvement in the Civil War. In 1908, the articles were collected and published by the Wisconsin Historical Commission as Capture and Escape: A Narrative of Army and Prison Life.

== Electoral history ==
Wisconsin Senate, 21st District Election, 1878
Party	Candidate	Votes	%	±%
Republican	John A. Kellogg	4,559	60.26%	
Democratic	M. H. Wadleigh	3,006	39.74%	
Total votes		7,565	100.0%	
Republican hold				

== Citations ==
Military offices
Preceded by Rufus Dawes	Command of the 6th Wisconsin Infantry Regiment; December 10, 1864 – July 16, 1865	Regiment disbanded
Wisconsin Senate
Preceded by Henry Mumbrue	Member of the Wisconsin Senate from the 21st district January 8, 1879 – January 12, 1881	Succeeded by Charles F. Crosby
Legal offices
Preceded by Richard Smith	District Attorney of Juneau County, Wisconsin; January 1, 1861 – April 1861	Succeeded by P. R. Briggs
