= Robert G. Siebecker =

American judge, 11th Chief Justice of the Wisconsin Supreme Court

The Honorable Robert G. Siebecker
- Siebecker as a justice, in the 1910s

11th Chief Justice of the Wisconsin Supreme Court
- In office July 13, 1920 – February 12, 1922
- Preceded by: John B. Winslow
- Succeeded by: Aad J. Vinje

Justice of the Wisconsin Supreme Court
- In office April 9, 1903 – February 12, 1922
- Appointed by: Robert M. La Follette
- Preceded by: Charles V. Bardeen
- Succeeded by: Charles H. Crownhart

Wisconsin Circuit Court Judge for the 9th Circuit
- In office January 1890 – April 9, 1903
- Appointed by: William D. Hoard
- Preceded by: Alva Stewart
- Succeeded by: E. Ray Stevens

City Attorney of Madison, Wisconsin
- In office 1886–1890

Personal details
- Born: Robert George Siebecker; October 17, 1854 Sumpter, Wisconsin, U.S.
- Died: February 12, 1922 (aged 67) Madison, Wisconsin, U.S.
- Resting place: Forest Hill Cemetery; Madison, Wisconsin
- Party: Democratic
- Spouse: Josephine La Follette (m. 1879–1922)
- Children: Karl; Robert; Lee; 1 other son (died young)
- Parent: William Siebecker (father)
- Relatives: Robert M. La Follette (brother-in-law); Robert M. La Follette Jr. (nephew); Philip La Follette (nephew)
- Education: University of Wisconsin
- Profession: Lawyer, judge

Robert George Siebecker (October 17, 1854 – February 12, 1922) was an American attorney and jurist from Wisconsin. He was the 11th chief justice of the Wisconsin Supreme Court, and served on the Court for the last 19 years of his life (1903–1922). Before being appointed to the Supreme Court, he served 13 years as a Wisconsin circuit court judge in central Wisconsin (Dane, Sauk, Columbia, and Marquette counties). Earlier, he was a law partner of Robert M. "Fighting Bob" La Follette, and married La Follette's sister, Josephine.

== Early life, education, and career ==
Siebecker was born in the town of Sumpter, in Sauk County, Wisconsin on October 17, 1854. He was the son of recent German American immigrants from Prussia.

Before turning 18, Siebecker spent much of his life working on his family's farm in Sauk County and attending local public schools. Beginning at 18, he attended two years at a private academy in Madison, Wisconsin, beginning in 1872. Here, he prepared himself to attend university.

In 1874 Siebecker began attending the University of Wisconsin. He graduated in 1878, with a bachelor of science. He then attended the University of Wisconsin Law School, graduation in June 1880. While at the university, he met Josephine La Follette, whom he later marry. Josephine was the sister of future Wisconsin Congressman, Governor, and U.S. Senator Robert M. "Fighting Bob" La Follette.

Siebecker was admitted to the bar in 1879 and entered into a law partnership with both Robert La Follette. Within a few years, both men entered public office. La Follette was elected to Congress in 1884. After La Follette's election to congress, S. A. Harper joined the firm as a third partner. In 1886, Siebecker was elected city attorney of Madison, a position he held for four years.

== Wisconsin Circuit Court ==
Siebecker, circa 1903

Siebecker was appointed Judge of the 9th Circuit of Wisconsin Courts by Governor William D. Hoard in January 1890, to fill the vacancy left by the death of Judge Alva Stewart. He ultimately served in that seat for 13 years, winning re-election without opposition in 1891 and 1897. Hoard was a member of the Republican Party, while Siebecker had been a lifelong member of the Democratic Party. The appointment generated great curiosity, as it marked the first instance in which a Wisconsin governor had appointed a member of the opposing political party to a circuit court judgeship. Proponents of a nonpartisan judiciary praised this. Siebecker was twice re-elected to the judgeship, facing no opponents in either instance.

At the time, the 9th Circuit was composed of Columbia, Dane, Marquette, and Sauk counties, with court proceedings held in Portage, Madison, Montello, and Baraboo, respectively.

== Wisconsin Supreme Court ==
Siebecker as a justice in the 1900s

On March 20, 1903, Wisconsin Supreme Court justice Charles V. Bardeen died. He had been set to run unopposed for another term on the court in the April 7, 1903, election. Because his death left no living candidates on the ballot, the Wisconsin Legislature took action to set a special nomination period for new candidates to file petitions to appear on the ballot. Siebecker was one of three candidates who filed sufficient signatures in the short, week-long nominating period.

Judge Siebecker won the election to the Supreme Court for a term beginning January 1904, defeating J. G. M. Wittig and William Ruger—who had attempted to withdraw his name from the race. Since the seat was already vacant, Governor La Follette—Siebecker's brother-in-law and former law partner—appointed him to join the court early almost immediately after the election. He was the 20th justice to serve on the Wisconsin Supreme Court, but the first to have been born in Wisconsin. He was also the first German American member of the Wisconsin Supreme Court.

With the death of Chief Justice John B. Winslow in 1920, Siebecker became the 11th Chief Justice of the Wisconsin Supreme Court. He remained in that office until his death in 1922.

== Personal life and family ==
Siebecker was a member of the Unitarian Church.

Siebecker married Josephine La Follette on May 15, 1879. They had four children together, although one child died young.

Siebecker died in his home in Madison, Wisconsin. He was eulogized by fellow Justice E. Ray Stevens, who said of him, "There is romance in the career of this boy from the farm who closed his life as the chief justice of this great court."

In addition to his judicial career, Justice Siebecker was a member and curator of the State Historical Society of Wisconsin.

Legal offices
Preceded by Alva Stewart	Wisconsin Circuit Court Judge for the 9th circuit January 1890 – April 9, 1903	Succeeded by E. Ray Stevens
Preceded by Charles V. Bardeen	Justice of the Wisconsin Supreme Court; April 9, 1903 – February 12, 1922	Succeeded by Charles H. Crownhart
Preceded by John B. Winslow	Chief Justice of the Wisconsin Supreme Court; July 13, 1920 – February 12, 1922	Succeeded by Aad John Vinje
