= Hiram Sawyer =

19th century American politician

Member of the Wisconsin State Assembly from the Dodge 3rd district
- In office January 1, 1866 – January 7, 1867
- Preceded by: Oscar F. Jones
- Succeeded by: Warren Marston

Chairman of the Board of Supervisors of Dodge County, Wisconsin
- In office January 4, 1864 – January 1, 1866
- Preceded by: Jacob Bodden
- Succeeded by: Harvey C. Griffin

Personal details
- Born: August 24, 1814 Orford, New Hampshire, U.S.
- Died: November 24, 1888 (aged 74) Burnett, Wisconsin, U.S.
- Resting place: Burnett Corners Cemetery, Burnett, Wisconsin
- Party: Democratic
- Spouse: Barbara Ann Wilson (m. 1837–1888)
- Children: Barbara Adaline (Billings)^{(b. 1839; died 1862)}; Abigail Eliza (Allen)^{(b. 1841; died 1909)}; Hiram Wilson Sawyer^{(b. 1843; died 1922)}; Mary Mindwell (Childs)^{(b. 1845; died 1935)}; Ransom J. Sawyer^{(b. 1847; died 1924)}; Hannah Wilson (Mayhew)^{(b. 1849; died 1923)}; Frank Merrill Sawyer^{(b. 1852; died 1901)}; Alvah Littlefield Sawyer^{(b. 1854; died 1925)}; Hattie Ann Sawyer^{(b. 1857; died 1864)}; Mattie Rosette (Martin)^{(b. 1860; died 1949)}; Sarah P. (White)^{(b. 1863; died 1893)}; Lewis M. Sawyer^{(b. 1867; died 1945)}
- Occupation: Stonecutter, farmer

Hiram Sawyer (August 24, 1814 – November 24, 1888) was an American stonecutter, farmer, and Wisconsin pioneer. He was a member of the Wisconsin State Assembly, representing Dodge County in the 1866 session.

== Biography ==
Hiram Sawyer was born Orford, New Hampshire, in August 1814. He was raised and received a basic education until age 15, when he went to work as an apprentice stonecutter. He followed that profession for 15 years until switching to agricultural work.

In 1845, he went west to the Wisconsin Territory to prospect for land. He purchased a tract of land in what is now the town of Burnett, Wisconsin, in Dodge County; he brought his wife and children to live on the farm the following year. This farm was his primary residence for the rest of his life.

He was involved with the Democratic Party of Wisconsin, and was elected to the Dodge County Board of Supervisors, serving as chairman for the 1864 and 1865 sessions. In 1865, he was elected to the Wisconsin State Assembly from Dodge County's 3rd Assembly district, which then comprised the towns of Emmet, Clyman, Oak Grove, Burnett, and Chester, and the northern half of the city of Waterford.

For several years in the 1870s, he served as a statistical correspondent for the United States Department of Agriculture, reporting on the farms and climate in Dodge County.

== Personal life and family ==
Hiram Sawyer was a son of Benjamin C. Sawyer and his wife Mindwell (née Sargent). Hiram had at least five brothers, three of whom also came to settle on farms in the town of Burnett, Wisconsin.

Hiram Sawyer married Barbara Ann Wilson on February 14, 1837. They had twelve children, though one daughter died in infancy. Their eldest son, Hiram Wilson Sawyer, also became a member of the Wisconsin State Assembly and served for over 20 years as a county judge in Washington County, Wisconsin.

Wisconsin State Assembly
Preceded by Oscar F. Jones	Member of the Wisconsin State Assembly from the Dodge 3rd district January 1, 1866 – January 7, 1867	Succeeded by Warren Marston
Political offices
Preceded by Jacob Bodden	Chairman of the Board of Supervisors of Dodge County, Wisconsin; January 4, 1864 – January 1, 1866	Succeeded by Harvey C. Griffin
