= Post Oak Springs Christian Church =

Historic church in Tennessee, United States

- U.S. National Register of Historic Places
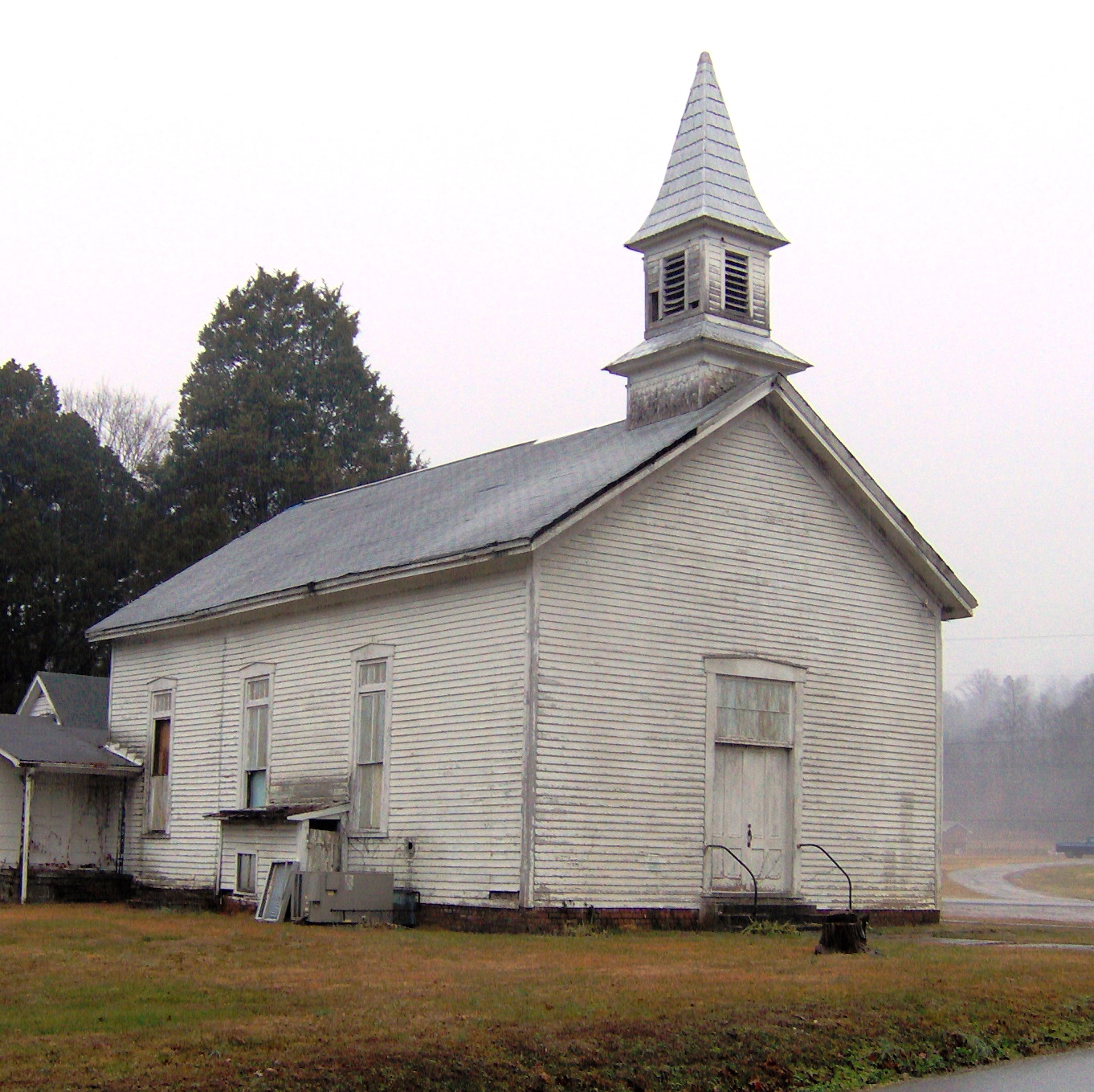
- The old Post Oak Springs Christian Church
- Location: Roane St. Hwy. (Old Kingston Hwy.) at Post Oak Rd
- Nearest city: Rockwood, Tennessee
- Coordinates: 35°52′24″N 84°38′02″W
- NRHP reference No.: 07000156
- Added to NRHP: March 15, 2007

Post Oak Springs Christian Church is an independent, non-denominational Christian church in rural Roane County, Tennessee, associated with the Restoration Movement. It is said to be the oldest Restoration Movement Christian Church in the American state of Tennessee, having been formed in 1812.

The church building, erected in 1876, is the third building to house the church's congregation. It was listed on the National Register of Historic Places in March 2007 as a representation of late nineteenth century settlement patterns and the development of the Christian church in rural East Tennessee. The congregation currently meets in a modern brick church across the street from the old church.

== Location ==
Post Oak Springs is located in Roane County, Tennessee, on the east side of Rockwood, off Roane State Highway, a short distance south of the Rockwood city limits.

== See also ==
- Joshua H. Berkey
