= Postoak, Tennessee =

- Unincorporated community
- Location within Tennessee Location within the United States
- Coordinates: 35°52′24″N 84°37′51″W
- Country: United States
- State: Tennessee
- County: Roane
- Elevation: 787 ft (240 m)
- Time zone: UTC-5 (Eastern (EST))
  - Summer (DST): UTC-4 (EDT)
- Area code: 865
- GNIS feature ID: 1298318

Postoak (see also Post Oak, Post Oak Springs) is an unincorporated community in Roane County, Tennessee, United States.

== Notable people ==
- Joshua Berkey, politician, newspaper editor, and Christian minister, was born in Post Oak Springs, in Roane County.
