= Willis C. Silverthorn =

19th century American politician

The Honorable Willis C. Silverthorn
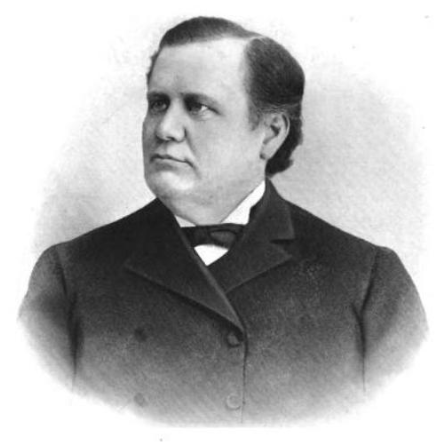

Wisconsin Circuit Court Judge for the 16th Circuit
- In office Spring 1898 – January 3, 1910
- Appointed by: Edward Scofield
- Preceded by: Charles V. Bardeen
- Succeeded by: Alexander H. Reid

Member of the Wisconsin Senate from the 21st district
- In office January 1, 1875 – January 1, 1877
- Preceded by: Myron H. McCord
- Succeeded by: Henry Mumbrue

Member of the Wisconsin State Assembly from the Marathon district
- In office January 1, 1874 – January 1, 1875
- Preceded by: Daniel L. Plumer
- Succeeded by: Bartholomew Ringle

Member of the Wisconsin State Assembly from the Marathon–Wood district
- In office January 1, 1868 – January 1, 1869
- Preceded by: George Hiles
- Succeeded by: Henry Reed

District Attorney of Marathon County, Wisconsin
- In office January 1, 1865 – January 1, 1871
- Preceded by: J. P. West
- Succeeded by: J. P. West

Personal details
- Born: Willis Chisholm Silverthorn; August 30, 1838 Toronto, Upper Canada, British North America
- Died: October 7, 1916 (aged 78) Wausau, Wisconsin, U.S.
- Resting place: Pine Grove Cemetery, Wausau
- Party: Democratic
- Spouses: Margaret Virginia Myers; (died 1878); Ida Mae Single; (died 1916)
- Children: with Margaret Myers; Margaret (Hadley)^{(b. 1874; died 1966)}; Nellie G. Silverthorn^{(b. 1877; died 1943)}; with Ida Mae Single; James Chisholm Silverthorn^{(b. 1880; died 1950)}; Hermione Silverthorn^{(b. 1882; died 1967)}; George Silverthorn^{(b. 1884; died 1962)}
- Education: University of Wisconsin
- Profession: lawyer

Willis Chisholm Silverthorn (August 30, 1838 – October 7, 1916) was a Canadian American immigrant, lawyer, and politician. He was a Wisconsin circuit court judge for 11 years and was the Democratic nominee for Governor of Wisconsin in 1896. Earlier in his life, he served two years each in the Wisconsin State Senate and the Wisconsin State Assembly.

== Background and personal life ==
Silverthorn was born on August 30, 1838, in Toronto, Upper Canada, the son of George and Sarah (Austin) Silverthorn. When he was three years old his family emigrated to Oakland in Jefferson County, Wisconsin, where he lived until leaving for Albion Academy, and then the University of Wisconsin. He graduated from their law school, was admitted to the Wisconsin Bar in 1863, and in 1864 moved to Wausau. He practiced law there, and in 1869 went into the banking business with his brother George Silverthorn and Daniel L. Plumer.

== Elected office ==
Silverthorn, a Democrat, was elected Marathon County District Attorney in 1864, and re-elected twice. In 1867 he was elected to the Assembly district which encompassed both Marathon and Wood Counties, succeeding fellow Democrat George Hiles; he was assigned to the standing committees on school and university lands, and on enrolled bills. He was succeeded for the 1869 term by another Democrat, Henry Reed.

In 1873 he was again elected to the Assembly for a one-year term (the district now consisted solely of Marathon County) to succeed his banking partner Daniel L. Plumer, this time as a "Liberal Democrat". Like Plumer, he was part of the Reform Party, a short-lived coalition of Democrats, reform and Liberal Republicans, and Grangers formed in 1873. He was assigned to the committees on the judiciary and on elections. In 1874 he was elected to the State Senate from the 21st District (Marathon, Oconto, Shawano and Waupaca counties and parts of Outagamie County) as a Liberal Democratic/Reform candidate, with 4693 votes to 3968 for Stalwart Republican Elisha L. Bump, for a two-year term; he was assigned to the committees on the judiciary and on federal relations in the first year, moving in the next session from federal relations to the committees on banks and banking, and on privileges and elections. He was not a candidate for re-election, and was succeeded by another Liberal, Henry Mumbrue.

In 1884, with the Reform Party having collapsed, Silverthorn ran as the Democratic nominee for Attorney General of Wisconsin, coming in second to Leander Frisby in a four-way race (Frisby 162,167; Silverthorn 145,018; 8313 for Prohibitionist F. M. Angel; and 4261 for Greenbacker M. W. Stevens). In 1896, he was the Democratic nominee for governor, losing to Republican nominee Edward Scofield in a five-way race. in January 1897 he was the Democratic candidate for United States Senate; he was defeated by John Coit Spooner, the Republican candidate; he was also opposed by Gold Democrats such as Jesse Clason (who voted for Spooner) and Albert Solliday, who cast a protest vote for William Freeman Vilas.

In 1903, Scofield appointed Silverthorn to a Wisconsin Circuit Court seat; he was re-elected in 1904, defeating old rival Elisha Bump.

== Leaving public life ==
Silverthorn left the judiciary in 1909 to devote his time to his private businesses, including the banking firm of Silverthorn & Plumer (which later became the First National Bank of Wausau) and the Northern Chief Iron Company.

== Personal life ==
In 1865, he married Maggie Virginia Myers, who came from Bowling Green, Kentucky. They had three children before her 1878 death. In 1879, he married Ida M. Single; they would have one son. Silverthorn died on October 7, 1916, in Wausau.

== Electoral history ==
Wisconsin Gubernatorial Election, 1896
Party	Candidate	Votes	%	±%
General Election, November 3, 1896
Republican	Edward Scofield	264,981	59.67%	+7.42%
Democratic	Willis C. Silverthorn	169,257	38.11%	+0.22%
Prohibition	Joshua H. Berkey	8,140	1.83%	−1.16%
Socialist Labor	Christ Tuttrop	1,306	0.29%	
Prohibition	Robert Henderson	407	0.09%	
	Scattering	19	0.00%	
Total votes		444,110	100.0%	+18.29%
Republican hold				

Party political offices
Preceded by George Wilbur Peck	Democratic nominee for Governor of Wisconsin; 1896	Succeeded by Hiram Wilson Sawyer
Legal offices
Preceded by J. P. West	District Attorney of Marathon County, Wisconsin; 1865 – 1871	Succeeded by J. P. West
Preceded by Charles V. Bardeen	Wisconsin Circuit Court Judge for the 16th Circuit; 1898 – 1910	Succeeded by Alexander H. Reid
