= Edward Scofield =

American politician (1842-1925)

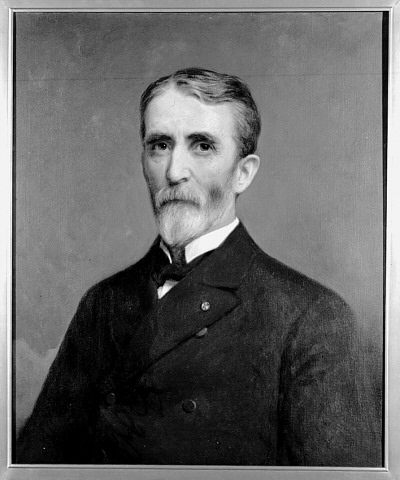

19th Governor of Wisconsin
- In office January 4, 1897 – January 7, 1901
- Lieutenant: Emil Baensch; Jesse Stone
- Preceded by: William H. Upham
- Succeeded by: Robert M. La Follette Sr.

Member of the Wisconsin Senate from the 1st district
- In office January 1, 1887 – February 4, 1891
- Preceded by: Edward S. Minor
- Succeeded by: John Fetzer

Personal details
- Born: March 28, 1842 Clearfield, Pennsylvania, U.S.
- Died: February 3, 1925 (aged 82) Oconto, Wisconsin, U.S.
- Resting place: Evergreen Cemetery, Oconto, Wisconsin
- Party: Republican
- Spouse: Agnes Potter (died 1919)
- Children: Julia Scofield; Paul Scofield; George Scofield
- Profession: lumberman, politician

Military service
- Allegiance: United States
- Branch/service: United States Volunteers; Union Army
- Years of service: 1861–1865
- Rank: Captain, USV
- Unit: 11th Reg. Penn. Reserves
- Battles/wars: American Civil War

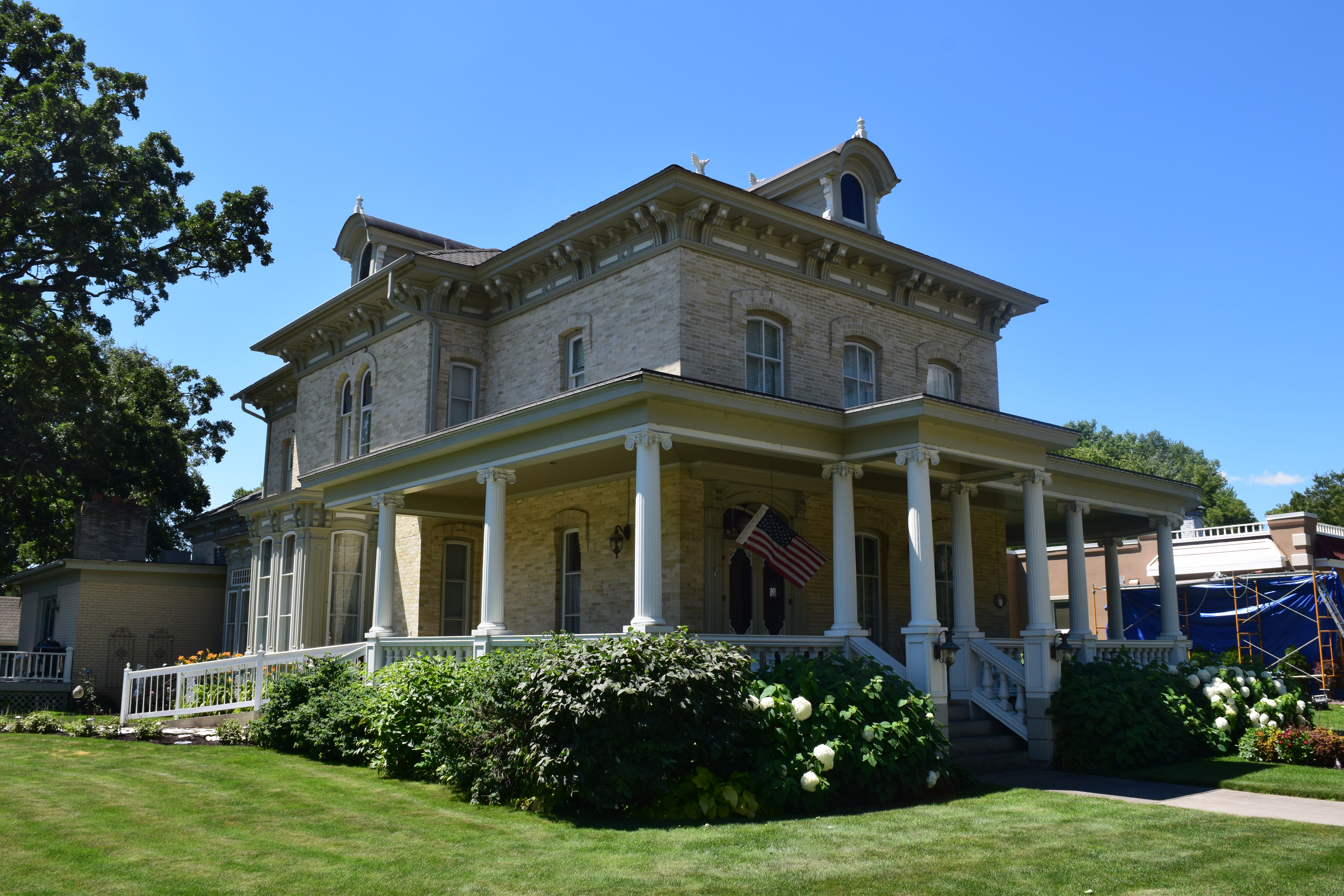
Scofield's house, located at 610 Main St. in Oconto, Wisconsin

Edward Scofield (March 28, 1842 – February 3, 1925) was an American lumberman and Republican politician. He was the 19th governor of Wisconsin (1897–1901) and served in the Wisconsin State Senate, representing Door, Marinette, and Oconto counties. Earlier in life, during the American Civil War, he served as an officer in the Union Army.

== Early life ==
Scofield was born in Clearfield County, Pennsylvania, on March 28, 1842. He became a printer's apprentice at a newspaper in Indiana, Pennsylvania, and worked in the newspaper business for a number of years.

== Civil War service ==
At the outbreak of the American Civil War, Scofield volunteered for service in the Union Army and was enrolled as a private in Company K of the 11th Pennsylvania Reserve Regiment. He was promoted to corporal and then sergeant, and, on April 15, 1863, after the Battle of South Mountain, he was commissioned as first lieutenant. He was subsequently promoted to captain of his company.

He participated in all the battles and marches of his regiment up to the Battle of the Wilderness on May 5, 1864, where he was taken prisoner and incorrectly reported as dead. He was held as a prisoner of war for ten months, passing through 12 different prison camps in the South before being released at Wilmington, North Carolina, on March 1, 1865. He was granted an honorary brevet to major after his release and mustered out of federal service.

== Postbellum career ==
For months after his release from prison, Scofield suffered due to the starvation and deprivation of his ten months in captivity. After his recuperation from his illness, he worked in the "engineer corps" of the Atlantic and Great Western Railroad. In 1868, he moved to Oconto, Wisconsin, where he entered the lumber business and became a principal in the Marinette Mill Co. Later becoming president of his own lumber company, the Scofield & Arnold Lumber Co. of Marinette.

== Political career ==
He entered politics when he was elected to the Wisconsin State Senate in 1886 as a Republican, beating Democrat Amos Holgate. He was appointed to the standing committees on engrossed bills (which he chaired) and on railroads. He ran for re-election in 1890 and the election was close enough to warrant a recount by the Senate Elections Committee. The 1890 election gave Democrats the majority in the Senate for the first time since 1855, the Democratic majority on the Elections Committee ruled in favor of his Democratic opponent, John Fetzer, finding that Scofield had been defeated by 15 votes.

=== Campaign and election ===
In 1896 Scofield was elected as the 19th Governor of Wisconsin. He entered the gubernatorial race as a conservative against progressive Republican Robert M. La Follette, winning the Republican nomination on the sixth ballot. In November, he defeated his Democratic opponent, Willis C. Silverthorn, in a five-way general election: 264,981 for Scofield; 169,257 for Silverthorn; 8,140 for Prohibitionist Joshua H. Berkey; 1,306 for Christ Tuttrop of the Socialist Labor Party; and 407 for Robert Henderson of the short-lived "National Party"—a splinter movement from the Prohibition Party.

Running for re-election in 1898, Scofield again faced a challenge for the Republican nomination from Robert La Follette. After a fight for delegates across the state, Scofield prevailed at the convention on the first ballot. Scofield went on to win the general election with 53% of the vote. He did not run for a third term in 1900.

=== Tenure ===
During his tenure, he introduced the first governor's budget in Wisconsin, established a central accounting system, and oversaw revision of the state's banking laws. He increased public school funding and helped raise troops to serve in the Spanish–American War. After completing a second term in office, he returned to his business interests in Oconto.

The most significant act of his gubernatorial term was likely the establishment of a state tax commission, the forerunner of the present Wisconsin Department of Revenue. The initial step was a study of state taxes which began in 1897, followed by an 1899 act of the Legislature to establish a state tax commission for ten years. The commission was made permanent under the subsequent gubernatorial term of Robert La Follette.

== Personal life and death ==
Scofield married Agnes Potter (1850–1919) and they had three children, Julia, Paul, and George.

Scofield died in his home in Oconto on February 3, 1925 (age 82 years, 312 days). He is interred at Evergreen Cemetery in Oconto.

== Electoral history ==
=== Wisconsin Senate (1886, 1890) ===
Wisconsin Senate, 1st District Election, 1886
Party	Candidate	Votes	%	±%
General Election, November 2, 1886
Republican	Edward Scofield	6,177	51.07%	−4.56%
Democratic	Amos Holgate	5,919	48.93%	
Plurality		258	2.13%	-9.12%
Total votes		12,096	100.0%	+32.66%
Republican hold				

Wisconsin Senate, 1st District Election, 1890
Party	Candidate	Votes	%	±%
General Election, November 4, 1890 (after recount)
Democratic	John Fetzer	3,304	50.11%	
Republican	Edward Scofield (incumbent)	3,289	49.89%	−1.18%
Plurality		15	0.23%	-1.91%
Total votes		6,593	100.0%	-45.49%
Democratic gain from Republican				

=== Wisconsin Governor (1896, 1898) ===
Wisconsin Gubernatorial Election, 1896
Party	Candidate	Votes	%	±%
General Election, November 3, 1896
Republican	Edward Scofield	264,981	59.67%	+7.42%
Democratic	Willis C. Silverthorn	169,257	38.11%	+0.22%
Prohibition	Joshua H. Berkey	8,140	1.83%	−1.16%
Labor	Christ Tuttrop	1,306	0.29%	
National Prohibition	Robert Henderson	407	0.09%	
	Scattering	19	0.00%	
Plurality		95,724	21.55%	+7.20%
Total votes		444,110	100.0%	+18.29%
Republican hold				

Wisconsin Gubernatorial Election, 1898
Party	Candidate	Votes	%	±%
General Election, November 8, 1898
Republican	Edward Scofield (incumbent)	173,137	52.57%	−7.09%
Democratic	Hiram W. Sawyer	135,353	41.10%	+2.99%
Populist	Albinus A. Worsley	8,518	2.59%	
Prohibition	Eugene W. Chafin	8,088	2.46%	
Social Democratic	Howard Tuttle	2,544	0.77%	
Socialist Labor	Henry Riese	1,473	0.45%	
	Scattering	327	0.10%	
Plurality		37,784	11.47%	-10.08%
Total votes		329,440	100.0%	-25.85%
Republican hold				

== See also ==
- Pennsylvania Reserves

Party political offices
Preceded by William H. Upham	Republican nominee for Governor of Wisconsin; 1896, 1898	Succeeded by Robert M. La Follette, Sr.
Wisconsin Senate
Preceded by Edward S. Minor	Member of the Wisconsin Senate from the 1st district January 1, 1887 – February 4, 1891	Succeeded by John Fetzer
Political offices
Preceded by William H. Upham	Governor of Wisconsin; January 4, 1897 – January 7, 1901	Succeeded by Robert M. La Follette, Sr.
