= 41st Wisconsin Infantry Regiment =

Union Army infantry regiment

- Flag of Wisconsin
- Active: June 8, 1864 – September 24, 1864
- Country: United States
- Allegiance: Union
- Branch: Infantry
- Size: Regiment
- Engagements: American Civil War: Second Battle of Memphis

Commanders
- Colonel: George B. Goodwin

The 41st Wisconsin Infantry Regiment was an infantry regiment that served in the Union Army during the American Civil War. It was among scores of regiments that were raised in the summer of 1864 as Hundred Days Men, an effort to augment existing manpower for an all-out push to end the war within 100 days.

== Service ==
The 41st Wisconsin was organized at Milwaukee, Wisconsin, and mustered into Federal service on June 8, 1864.

The regiment was mustered out on September 24, 1864.

== Casualties ==
The 41st Wisconsin suffered 18 enlisted men who died of disease, for a total of 18 fatalities.

== Commanders ==
- Colonel George B. Goodwin

== See also ==
- List of Wisconsin Civil War units
- Wisconsin in the American Civil War
