= Joshua H. Berkey =

American politician (1852 - 1911)

- American touring temperance lecturer Joshua H. Berkey as he appeared in his later years
- Born: March 11, 1852; Post Oak Springs, Tennessee, USA
- Died: June 16, 1911 (aged 59); Crystal Lake, Illinois
- Known for: Temperance activism

Joshua Hernandez Berkey (March 11, 1852 – June 16, 1911) was an American newspaper publisher, Christian minister, and anti-alcohol political activist in the states of Kansas and Wisconsin. A touring orator who delivered as many as 200 lectures per year, Berkey is best remembered for his 1896 campaign for Governor of Wisconsin heading the ticket of that state's Prohibition Party, in which he finished third to the candidates of the Republican and Democratic parties.

== Biography ==
=== Early years ===
Joshua Hernandez Berkey was born March 11, 1852, in the rural hamlet of Post Oak Springs, Roane County, Tennessee. His father, Jacob W. Berkey, hailed from the state of Indiana, while his mother, the former Mary R. Moore, was a Tennessee native. Together, his parents raised three sons, moving to Wisconsin in 1860.

His father, of ethnic Dutch descent, was a showman toured extensively throughout the United States during his life, frequently taking Joshua on the road with him until his death in 1871 at the age of 47. Berkey settled in Monroe, Wisconsin, the county seat of Green County, located near the state's southern border. There he married Sarah M. Sears in the fall of 1875. Together the couple raised six children.

Berkey initially studied to become a pharmacist, opening a drug store in the neighboring town of Monticello shortly after his marriage. During the several years in which he was in business, Berkey became interested in the growing political movement calling for the restriction or prohibition of alcohol. He was consumed by this issue for the rest of his life.

In 1880, Berkey sold his drug store and moved west with his family to the booming city of Denver, Colorado, where he took a position as a secretary for a mining company. He soon turned his attention to journalism, however, taking a position as business manager of a weekly Denver newspaper called The Great West before leaving to launch his own publication, a humorous literary weekly newspaper called Hello.

Berkey liquidated his assets in Denver in 1883 and moved to the midwestern state of Kansas, where he purchased a farm in Sumner County. He remained there until 1891, starting a temperance newspaper called "The Crank" in Geuda Springs, Kansas, which was a widely circulated paper. It was as publisher of this newspaper that Berkey became a figure of national standing in the American prohibition movement.

=== Political career ===
Berkey's anti-alcohol newspaper drew attention across the state of Kansas and he began traveling the region as a lecturer on temperance and other related political themes. He became a member of the Seventh-day Adventist Church during the early 1890s.

In 1896, Berkey was the candidate of the Prohibition Party for Governor of Wisconsin. He finished third, behind Edward Scofield and Willis C. Silverthorn.

Berkey entered the ministry in 1898, returning to Monroe, Wisconsin, to take to the pulpit of the Congregationalist Christian Church there.

In 1902, Berkey was an unsuccessful candidate for the Wisconsin State Assembly. Berkey also stood for election as the Prohibition Party's nominee for United States House of Representatives in Wisconsin First District in the election of 1908.

Berkey remained an active and popular touring lecturer on behalf of the prohibitionist cause until the time of his death, delivering more than 200 lectures under the auspices of the Lincoln Chautauqua during the 1910 lecture season.

=== Death and legacy ===
June 1911 found Berkey in Crystal Lake, Illinois, a small town in McHenry County where he owned several acres of farmland. He spent Thursday, June 15 and the morning of Friday, June 16 visiting Rev. I.N. Adrian, an old school classmate, with a view to visiting scenes from his boyhood days. He was last seen alive about noon of June 16.

When he did not return that evening, Berkey's friend alerted the authorities and a search was begun. Berkey's body was discovered at 4 pm on June 17 near an old picnic grounds at Crystal Lake, submerged beneath six feet of water a short distance from shore. A watch in his clothing was stopped at 1:30; the body was deemed by authorities to have been in the water for "many hours." Circumstances leading to his death by drowning at the age of 59 were unknown.

Berkey's death coincidentally came about one week after that of famed temperance activist Carrie Nation in a Kansas sanitarium.

== See also ==
- Post Oak Springs Christian Church
