= Joseph McKeen Morrow =

19th century American politician

Wisconsin Circuit Judge for the 6th circuit
- In office October 6, 1893 – January 7, 1895
- Appointed by: George Wilbur Peck
- Preceded by: Alfred W. Newman
- Succeeded by: Orvis B. Wyman

Member of the Wisconsin State Assembly from the Monroe County district
- In office January 16, 1862 – January 5, 1863
- Preceded by: Simon D. Powers
- Succeeded by: William W. Jackson

Personal details
- Born: January 1, 1832 East Aurora, New York, U.S.
- Died: July 28, 1899 (aged 67) Sparta, Wisconsin, U.S.
- Resting place: Woodlawn Cemetery, Sparta
- Party: Democratic
- Spouse: Olive Graves
- Children: 1

Joseph McKeen Morrow (January 1, 1832 – July 28, 1899) was an American lawyer, Democratic politician, and pioneer of Wisconsin and Montana. He served one term in the Wisconsin State Assembly, in 1862, and was a Wisconsin circuit court judge by appointment in 1893 and 1894.

== Biography ==
Born in East Aurora, New York, he studied law in Buffalo, New York. He then moved to Sparta, Wisconsin and was admitted to the Wisconsin bar. He practices law in Sparta, Wisconsin. In 1862, Morrow served in the Wisconsin State Assembly. He was elected in a special election succeeding Simon D. Powers who died in office. He moved to Montana Territory in 1864 because of his health and stayed there until 1866. In 1893, he was appointed Wisconsin state court judge and lost the election in April 1894. During the administration of President Grover Cleveland, he was appointed collector of internal revenue. Morrow died in Sparta, Wisconsin.

Wisconsin State Assembly
Preceded by Simon D. Powers	Member of the Wisconsin State Assembly from the Monroe County district January 16, 1862 – January 5, 1863	Succeeded by William W. Jackson
Legal offices
Preceded by Alfred W. Newman	Wisconsin Circuit Judge for the 6th circuit October 6, 1893 – January 7, 1895	Succeeded by Orvis B. Wyman
