= Hannibal Dixon =

American politician

Hannibal S. Dixon (July 1, 1834 – April 29, 1881) was a member of the Wisconsin State Assembly.

== Biography ==
Dixon was born in Jefferson County, New York in 1834. Reports have differed on the exact date and location. He relocated to Wisconsin in 1855. He married Alice Dickinson and they had four children. Dixon died in New London, Wisconsin in 1881.

== Career ==
Dixon was a Republican member of the Assembly during the 1877 session. Additionally, he was president (similar to mayor) of New London and a member of the county board of Waupaca County, Wisconsin.
