= Joseph Morrow (hospital administrator) =

Joseph Morrow was an American medical administrator who played a key role in founding and the early years of Bergen Pines Hospital, now New Bridge Medical Center.

== Biography ==
Morrow was born in Hackett, Arkansas. He was a graduate of the Medical Department of the University of Fort Worth, Texas, now part of Baylor University. He interned at Willard Parker Hospital then, in 1910, as an intern at the New York City Department of Health and Mental Hygiene.

Morrow was the first director of Bergen Pines Hospital, leading the hospital from its founding on August 12, 1916 until he retired on December 1, 1945. In that role, he was also head of Bergen County Medical Society and led the county's response to an infantile paralysis epidemic in the early 1930s. He was considered an authority on tuberculosis research and treatment.

In 1940, he was made a fellow of the American College of Hospital Administration. After his resignation in 1945, a luncheon was held by the board honoring him. He was also a key figure in organizing the American College of Chest Physicians.

He died on April 18, 1962 in Redwood City, California. He was 76 years old.
