= Asa L. Baldwin =

Member of the Wisconsin State Assembly during the 1877 session

Asa L. Baldwin (July 17, 1822 – ?) was an American politician, born in West Fairlee, Vermont. He was a member of the Wisconsin State Assembly during the 1877 session. Other positions he held include postmaster and superintendent of schools. He was a Republican.
