= Andrew Martin (Wisconsin politician) =

American politician

Andrew Martin was a Democratic member of the Wisconsin State Assembly. He served during the 1875 and 1876 sessions. Reports have differed on the date of Martin's birth. He was born in Prussia.
