= Hopewell Coxe =

American politician

Hopewell Coxe (June 28, 1812 – June 16, 1864) was an American lawyer.

Born in Northumberland, Pennsylvania, Coxe studied law in Williamsport, Pennsylvania and was admitted to the Pennsylvania bar in 1838. In 1842, he moved to Kentucky and in 1845, Coxe moved to Wisconsin Territory. He lived in Cedarburg, Wisconsin. He served as a probate judge from 1846 to 1854. Coxe served in the first Wisconsin Constitutional Convention of 1846. He then moved to Hartford, Wisconsin and served in the Wisconsin State Assembly in 1857. He died in Hartford, Wisconsin.
