= George H. Calkins =

American physician and politician (1830–1896)

George H. Calkins (April 21, 1830 – June 26, 1896) was an American physician and politician.

Born in Castile, New York, Calkins graduated from the Buffalo University of Medicine, in Buffalo, New York in 1856. In 1856, Calkins moved to Waupaca, Wisconsin and practiced medicine. From 1864 to 1865, Calkins served in the Union Army and was stationed at Camp Randall, Madison, Wisconsin and was surgeon in charge of Harvey Hospital. In 1875, Calkins served in the Wisconsin State Assembly as a Republican. He also served as surgeon at the Veterans' Home. Calkins died suddenly of a stroke in Waupaca, Wisconsin.
