= Shawano =

Shawano is a name derived from a modified Menominee word "Sāwanoh", which means south.

== Places ==
United States

- Shawano County, Wisconsin
- Shawano, Wisconsin, city and county seat of Shawano County

== Other ==
United States

- Shawano Lake
- Shawano Municipal Airport
