= Green Valley, Wisconsin =

Green Valley is the name of some places in the U.S. state of Wisconsin:

- Green Valley, Marathon County, Wisconsin, a town
- Green Valley, Shawano County, Wisconsin, a town
- Green Valley (CDP), Wisconsin, a census-designated place in Shawano County, Wisconsin
