= Advance, Wisconsin =

- Unincorporated community
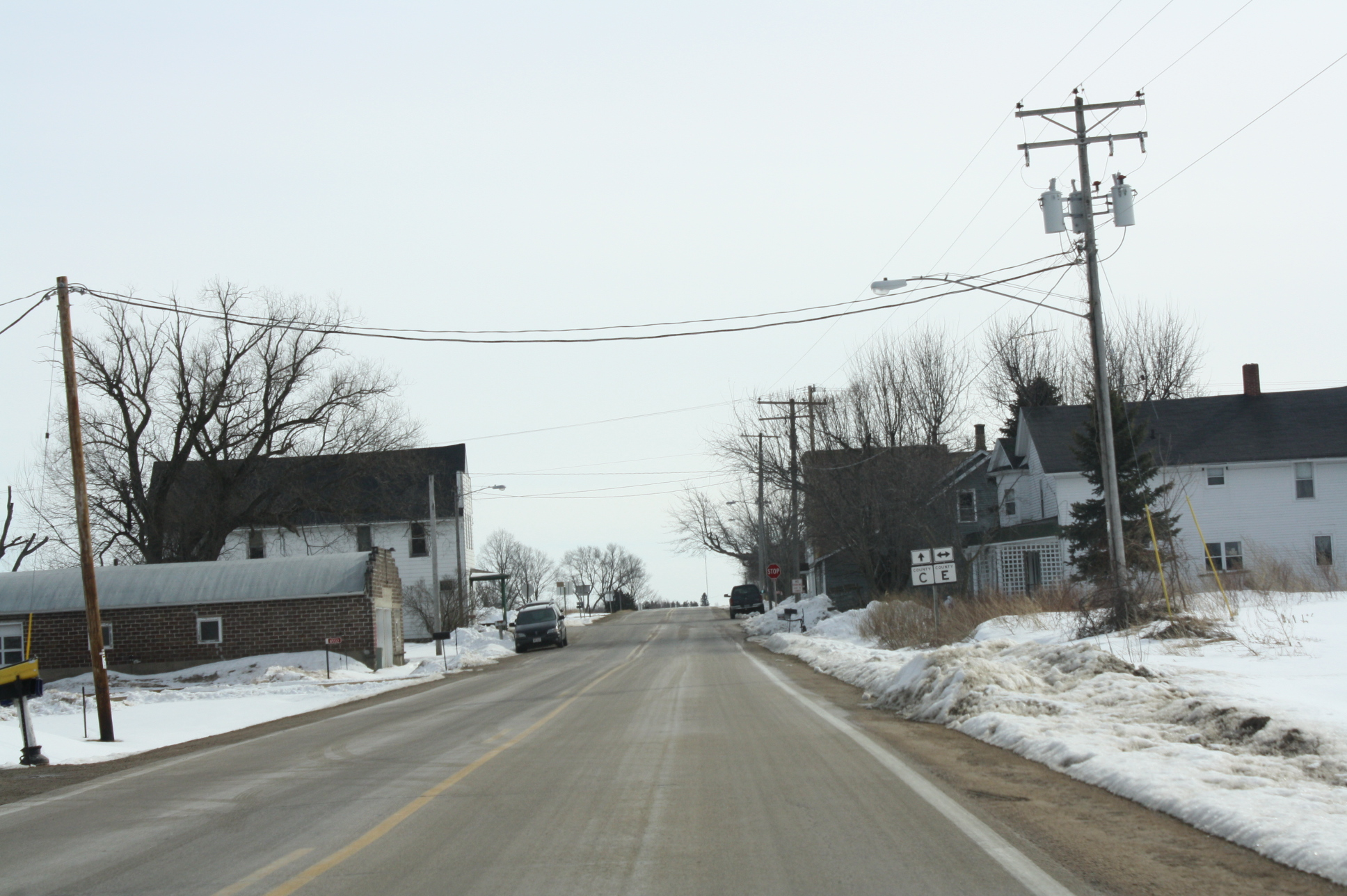
- Looking south in downtown Advance

- Location within Wisconsin Location within the United States
- Coordinates: 44°47′16″N 88°19′56″W
- Country: United States
- State: Wisconsin
- County: Shawano
- Elevation: 856 ft (261 m)
- Time zone: UTC-6 (Central (CST))
  - Summer (DST): UTC-5 (CDT)
- Area codes: 715 & 534
- GNIS feature ID: 1560703

Advance is an unincorporated community located in the town of Green Valley, Shawano County, Wisconsin, United States. Advance is located at the junction of county highways C and E, 6 miles (9.7 km) east-southeast of Cecil.

== History ==
A post office was formerly located in Advance. The community had a school, the Advance School, which was repurposed and used as the town hall. In 2003, the town hall was converted into a community center, which included a park with a playground and baseball diamond.

The population in 2004 was approximately 50.

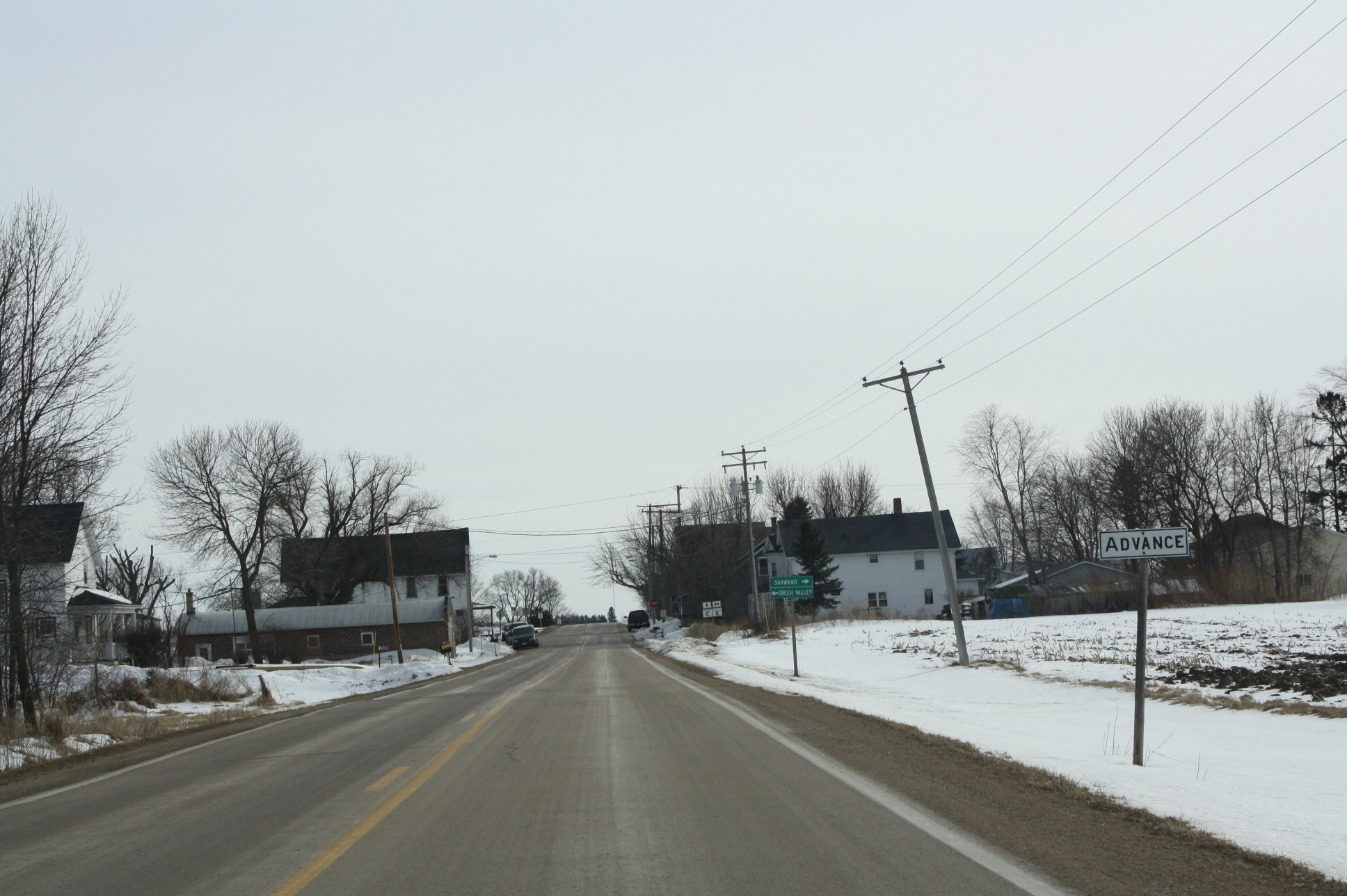
Approaching Advance
