= EZS =

EZS may refer to:

- EasyJet Switzerland, an airline
- Elazığ Airport, in Turkey
- Ezzahra Sports, a Tunisian basketball club
- Shawano Municipal Airport, in Wisconsin, United States
