= Pulcifer, Wisconsin =

Census-designated place in Wisconsin, United States

- Census-designated place
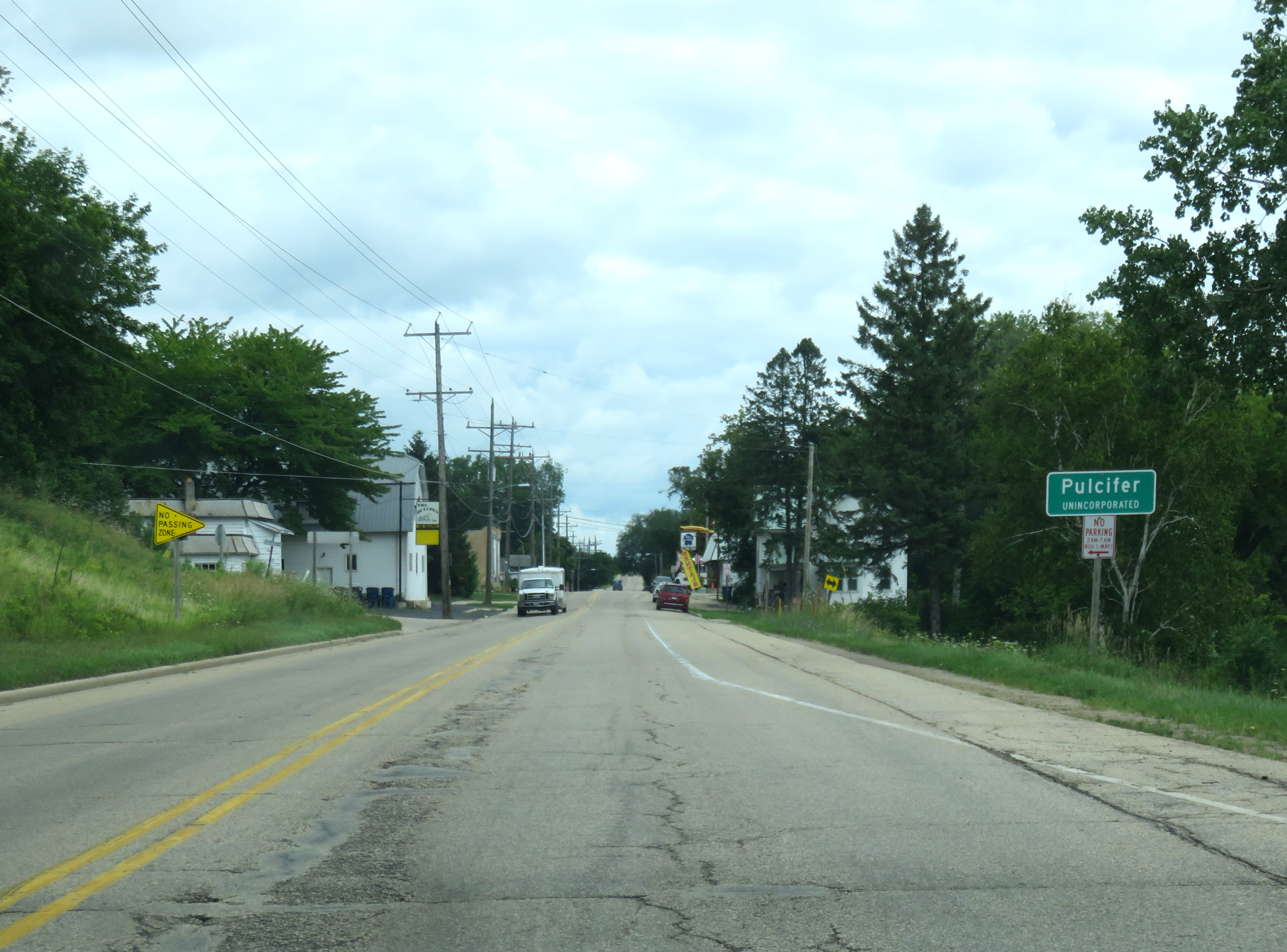

- Location within Wisconsin
- Coordinates: 44°50′39″N 88°21′36″W
- Country: United States
- State: Wisconsin
- County: Shawano

Area
  - Total: 1.038 sq mi (2.69 km^{2})
  - Land: 1.033 sq mi (2.68 km^{2})
  - Water: 0.005 sq mi (0.013 km^{2})
- Elevation: 791 ft (241 m)

Population (2020)
  - Total: 131
  - Density: 127/sq mi (49.0/km^{2})
- Time zone: UTC-6 (Central (CST))
  - Summer (DST): UTC-5 (CDT)
- Area codes: 715 & 534
- GNIS feature ID: 1571968

Pulcifer is an unincorporated census-designated place in the town of Green Valley, Shawano County, Wisconsin, United States. Pulcifer is located on the Oconto River and Wisconsin Highway 22, 5 miles (8.0 km) northeast of Cecil. As of the 2020 census, Pulcifer had a population of 131.

== History ==
The community was named after Daniel H. Pulcifer (1834–1896), who served in the Wisconsin State Assembly and also served as mayor of Shawano, Wisconsin.

== Notable people ==
- Otto A. Risum, Wisconsin State Assemblyman, farmer, and merchant, lived in Pulcifer; Risum served as chairman of the Green Valley Town Board.
