= Otto A. Risum =

American politician

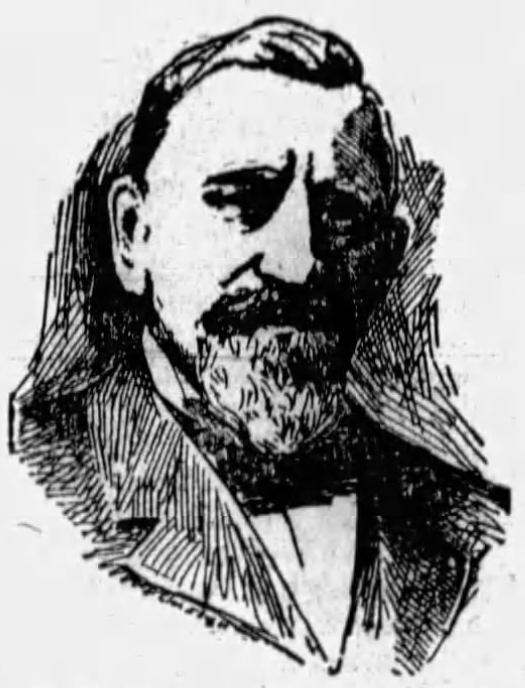

Member of the Wisconsin State Assembly
- In office 1897–1897

Personal details
- Born: Otto Axel Risum; February 24, 1835 Christiania, Norway
- Died: March 11, 1924 (aged 89) Sawtelle, California
- Party: Republican
- Occupation: Farmer, merchant, politician

Otto Axel Risum (February 24, 1835 – March 11, 1924) was an American farmer, merchant, and politician.

== Biography ==
Born in Christiania, Norway, Risum emigrated to the United States in 1856 and eventually settled in Rock County, Wisconsin. Risum served in the 15th Wisconsin Volunteer Regiment during the American Civil War. In 1873, Risum settled in Pulcifer, Shawano County, Wisconsin in the town of Green Valley. He was a farmer and merchant. Risum served as chairman of the Green Valley town board and was a Republican. In 1897, Risum served in the Wisconsin State Assembly. Risum moved to Sawtelle, California to live in a warmer climate; he died there and was buried at the Los Angeles National Cemetery.
