= Daniel Pulcifer =

American politician (1834–1896)

Daniel H. Pulcifer (November 16, 1834 – January 19, 1896) was an American public official, printer, and politician.

Born in Vergennes, Vermont, Pulcifer learned the printing trade. In 1855, Pulcifer moved to the town of Oasis, Wisconsin and then moved to Shawano. He served as Wisconsin Circuit Court clerk for Shawano County, Wisconsin. He served as sheriff for Shawano County. Pulcifer was the deputy United States marshal and the United States Post Office inspector. Pulcifer served as mayor of Shawano, Wisconsin. In 1867 and 1879, Pulcifer served in the Wisconsin State Assembly and was a Republican. He then served as sergeant-at-arms for the Wisconsin Assembly. Pulcifer died suddenly of heart disease in Shawano, aged 61. The community of Pulcifer, Wisconsin, in Shawano County, was named after him.
