= Green Valley (CDP), Wisconsin =

Census-designated place in Wisconsin, United States

Green Valley, Wisconsin
- Census-designated place
- Location within Wisconsin
- Coordinates: 44°47′44″N 88°16′13″W
- Country: United States
- State: Wisconsin
- County: Shawano

Area
  - Total: 0.187 sq mi (0.48 km^{2})
  - Land: 0.187 sq mi (0.48 km^{2})
  - Water: 0 sq mi (0 km^{2})
- Elevation: 810 ft (250 m)

Population (2020)
  - Total: 110
  - Density: 590/sq mi (230/km^{2})
- Time zone: UTC-6 (Central (CST))
  - Summer (DST): UTC-5 (CDT)
- Area codes: 715 & 534
- GNIS feature ID: 1565830

Green Valley is an unincorporated census-designated place located in the town of Green Valley, Shawano County, Wisconsin, United States. Green Valley is 16.5 miles (26.6 km) east of Shawano. As of the 2020 census, its population was 110.

== History ==
Historical population
Census	Pop.	Note	%±
2010	133		—
2020	110		−17.3%
U.S. Decennial Census

A post office was first established at Green Valley in 1907; the post office closed on May 21, 2011. The community was named after the green valley in which it located.
