= Shawano Lake =

Lake in the state of Wisconsin, United States

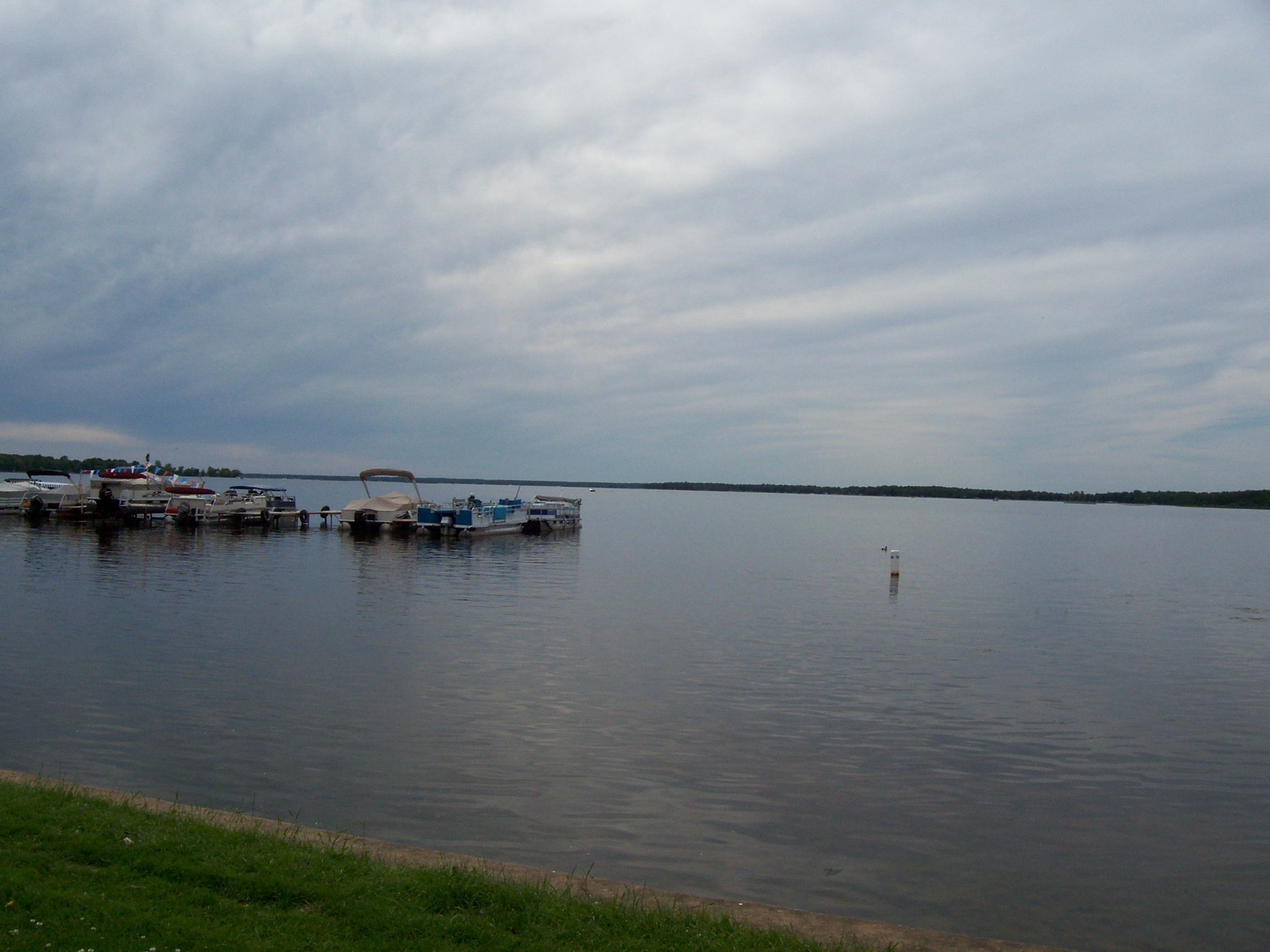
- Looking west from Cecil's park

- Location within Wisconsin Location within the United States
- Location: Shawano County, Wisconsin, United States
- Coordinates: 44°48′36″N 88°30′47″W
- Primary inflows: Loon Creek
- Primary outflows: Wolf River
- Basin countries: United States
- Surface area: 6,178 acres (2,500 ha)
- Average depth: 9 ft (2.7 m)
- Max. depth: 42 ft (13 m)
- Surface elevation: 802 feet (244 m)
- Islands: Schumacher Island
- Settlements: Shawano, Cecil

Shawano Lake (/ˈʃɔːnoʊ/ SHAW-noh) is a lake situated in Shawano County in northeastern Wisconsin. Shawano Lake is a hard water drainage lake with multiple inlets and one major outlet, the Wolf River. A dam on the Wolf River located in the City of Shawano raises the water levels of Shawano Lake. Shawano Lake is approximately 6,178 acres (25.00 km^{2}), with an average depth of approximately 9 feet (2.7 m) and a maximum depth of approximately 42 feet (13 m). The shoreline length is estimated at 18 miles (29 km). The Towns of Wescott, and Washington, and the Village of Cecil border Shawano Lake.

== Activities ==
Shawano Lake is a popular lake for recreational fishing, boating, swimming, water skiing, bird watching, hunting, and other outdoor activities. It is currently a eutrophic lake with elevated levels of algae blooms, nutrients, and nuisance aquatic plants. Aquatic plant management is a major management objective for the lake.

Shawano Lake is one of the most heavily fished lakes in the area. It contains many species of fish, including walleye, largemouth bass and panfish in the early season. Ice fisherman concentrate on northern pike and panfish. Fishing tournaments are common on the lake. Two ice racing tracks are used on the lake in the winter.

== Development ==
Shawano Lake is heavily developed, with dense residential housing surrounding most of the shoreline. It lies within the Shawano Lake Sanitary District, so all dwellings have sanitary sewers and public water supply. There are many resorts and cabin rentals on the lake.

== Fishing and Wildlife ==
Shawano Lake is managed as a warm water fishery. The primary game fish species are northern pike, largemouth bass, and walleye. The predominant panfish are bluegill, black crappie, yellow perch and pumpkinseed. Good natural reproduction supports the fishery. Over the last ten years a musky population has been established and is maintained by annual stocking. A walleye spawning reef was developed on Shawano Lake in the mid-1980s. Annual fall electrofishing surveys are conducted on the lake to monitor the reproductive success of walleye and largemouth bass, with periodic spring fyke netting surveys conducted to monitor the overall fishery.

Shawano Lake is important as a resting stop for migrating waterfowl. Numerous species of wildlife inhabit the undeveloped shoreland areas. Standing dead and dying trees (snags) on the uplands provide habitat for various species of birds and insects, including bald eagles, bats, woodpeckers, and songbirds. Several species of mammals and birds use cavities in trees for dens. Salamanders, small mammals, and invertebrates use downed and rotting logs for protection, feeding and breeding sites. Downed trees in or at the water's edge (woody cover) are especially valuable for resting and feeding areas. Aquatic and wetland vegetation at or near the water's edge provides critical habitat for small mammals, amphibians, reptiles, birds, and fish at all life stages.

== Lake Access ==
Shawano Lake has about 24 access points, which are a combination of public and private landings and town owned fire lanes. A county park is located on Shawano Lake, with a swimming beach and boat launch. A second park is located within the Village of Cecil, which is used as an access point for one of the ice racing tracks.

Shawano Municipal Airport is also located on Shawano Lake and uses part of the lake for a runway. It is frequently used for pontoon plane take-offs and landings during the summer months.

== Media ==
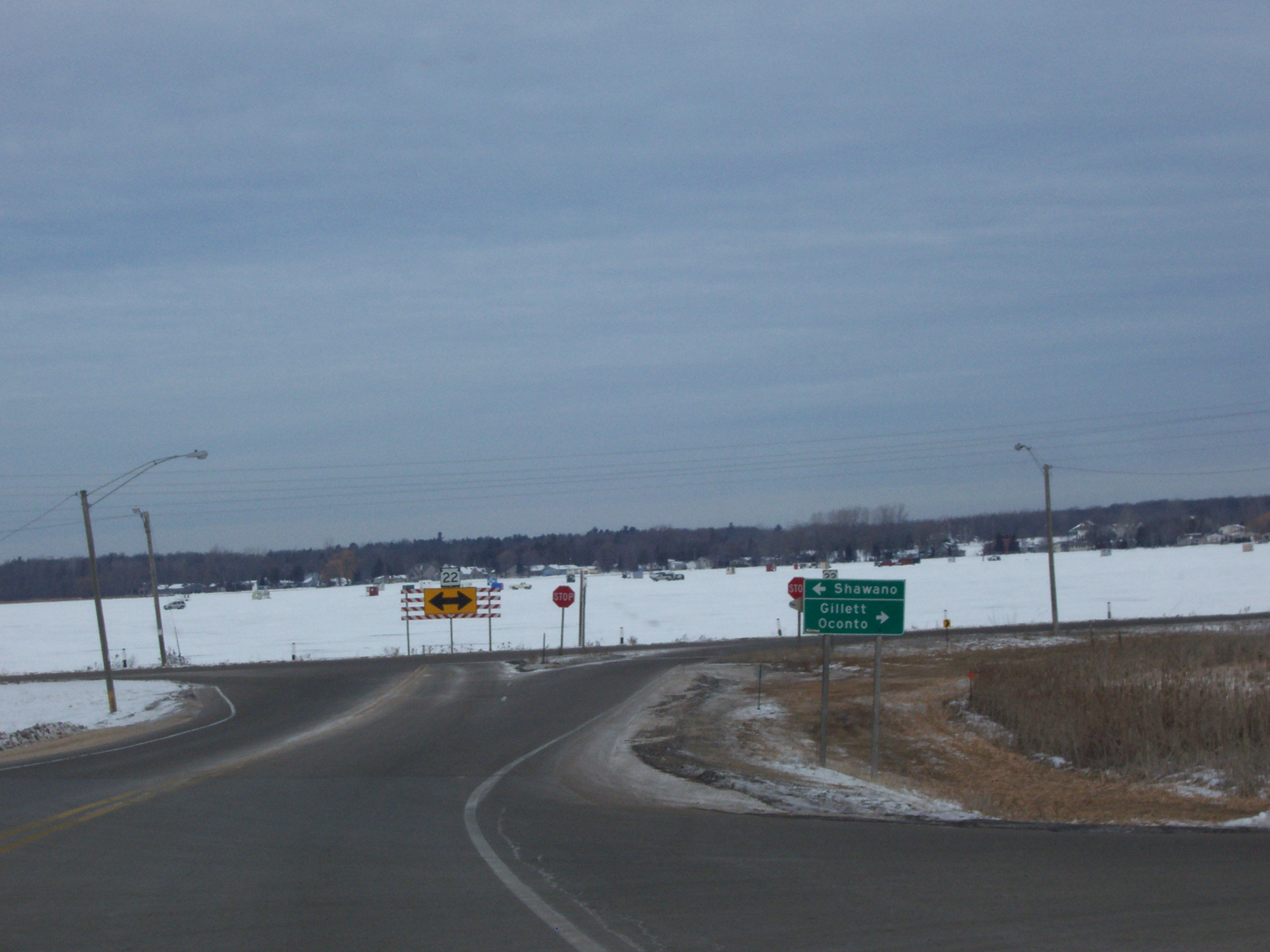
Ice-covered Shawano Lake in winter

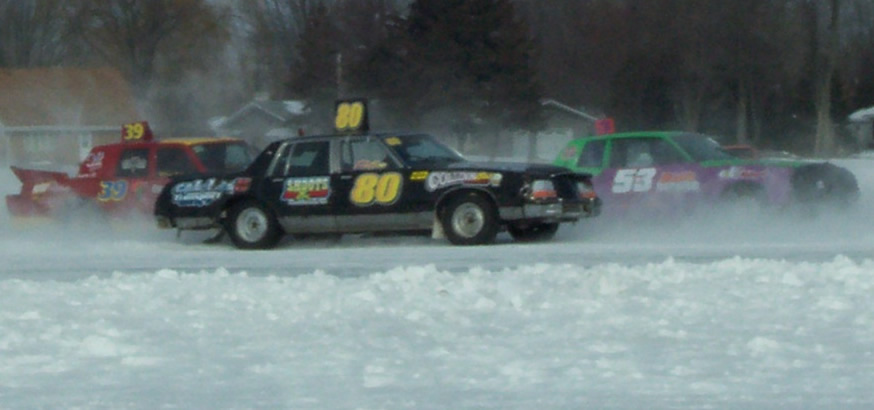
Ice racing

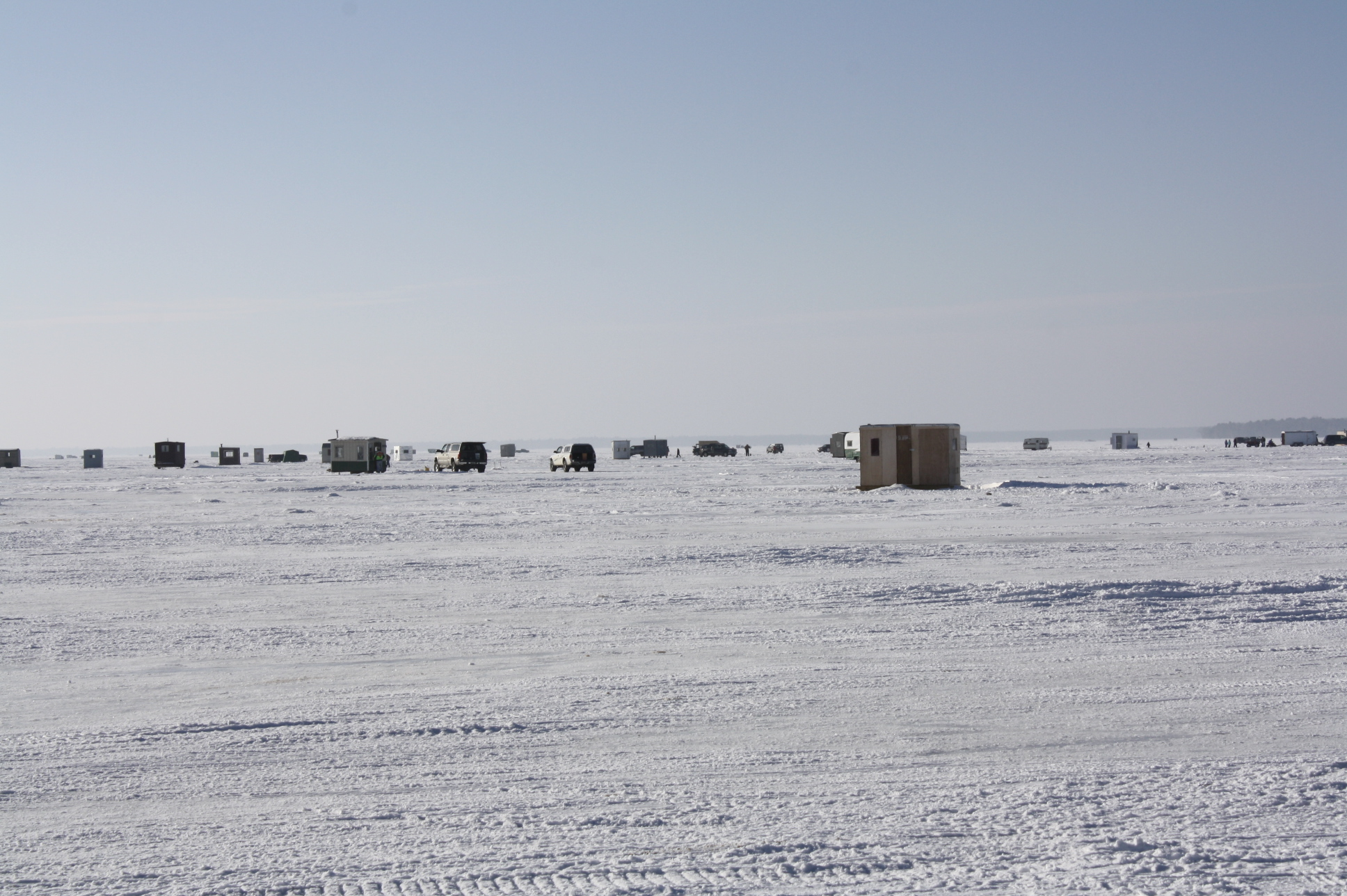
Ice shanties

Ice racing
Ice racing on Shawano Lake — 2.3 MB
