= Shawano Municipal Airport =

Airport in Wisconsin, United States

- IATA: none; ICAO: KEZS; FAA LID: EZS

Summary
- Airport type: Public
- Owner: Shawano City and County
- Serves: Shawano, Wisconsin
- Opened: March 1945
- Time zone: CST (UTC−06:00)
  - Summer (DST): CDT (UTC−05:00)
- Elevation AMSL: 813 ft (248 m)
- Coordinates: 44°47′14″N 088°33′36″W

Map
- Location of airport in Wisconsin EZS (the United States)

Runways
Direction	Length		Surface
Direction	ft	m	Surface
12/30	3,901	1,189	Asphalt
17/35	2,225	678	Asphalt
ALL/WAY	12,000	3,658	Water

Statistics
- Aircraft operations (2023): 12,700
- Based aircraft (2024): 20
- Source: Federal Aviation Administration

Shawano Municipal Airport (ICAO: KEZS, FAA LID: EZS, formerly 3WO) is a city and county-owned public-use airport located one nautical mile (2 km) northeast of the central business district of Shawano, a city in Shawano County, Wisconsin, United States. It is included in the Federal Aviation Administration (FAA) National Plan of Integrated Airport Systems for 2025–2029, in which it is categorized as a local general aviation facility. The airport is located on Shawano Lake and has a landing area for seaplanes.

Although many U.S. airports use the same three-letter location identifier for the FAA and IATA, this facility is assigned EZS by the FAA but has no designation from the IATA (which assigned EZS to Elazığ Airport in Elazığ, Turkey).

== Facilities and aircraft ==
Shawano Municipal Airport covers an area of 342 acres (138 ha) at an elevation of 813 feet (248 m) above mean sea level. It has two asphalt paved runways: the primary runway 12/30 is 3,901 by 75 feet (1,189 x 23 m) and the crosswind runway 17/35 is 2,225 by 60 feet (678 x 18 m). The airport also has one seaplane landing area measuring 12,000 by 1,000 feet (3,658 x 305 m).

For the 12-month period ending September 14, 2023, the airport had 12,700 aircraft operations, an average of 35 per day: 96% general aviation, 2% air taxi and 2% military. In July 2024, there were 20 aircraft based at this airport: 19 single-engine and 1 multi-engine.

== See also ==
- List of airports in Wisconsin
