= Cecil, Wisconsin =

- Village
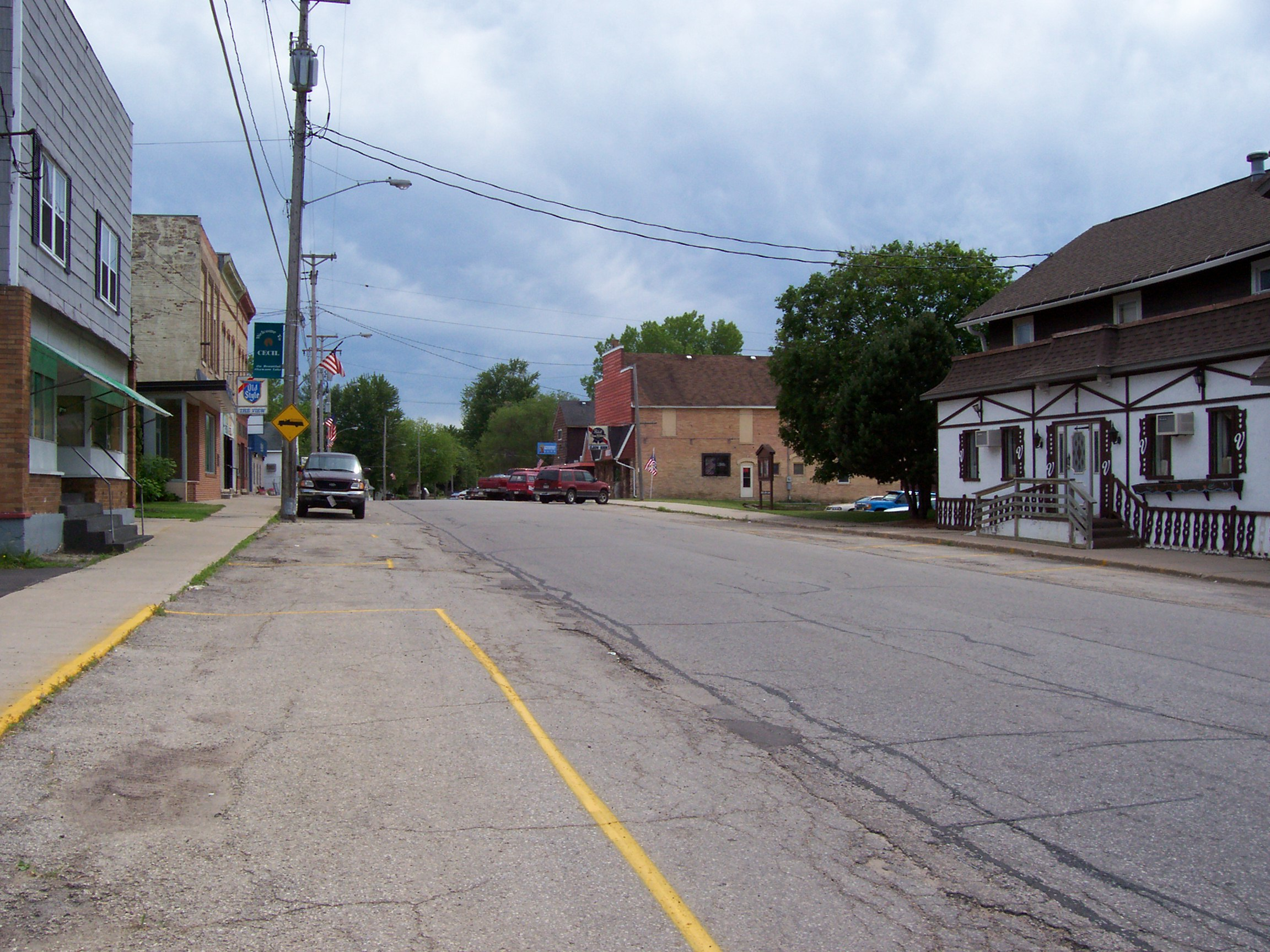
- Downtown Cecil

- Location of Cecil in Shawano County, Wisconsin.
- Coordinates: 44°48′34″N 88°27′8″W
- Country: United States
- State: Wisconsin
- County: Shawano

Area
  - Total: 1.80 sq mi (4.66 km^{2})
  - Land: 1.79 sq mi (4.64 km^{2})
  - Water: 0.012 sq mi (0.03 km^{2})
- Elevation: 807 ft (246 m)

Population (2020)
  - Total: 529
  - Density: 295/sq mi (114/km^{2})
- Time zone: UTC-6 (Central (CST))
  - Summer (DST): UTC-5 (CDT)
- Area codes: 715 & 534
- FIPS code: 55-13325
- GNIS feature ID: 1562830
- Website: villageofcecil.com

Cecil is a village in Shawano County, Wisconsin, United States. The population was 529 at the 2020 census.

== History ==
The village was named after a railroad man, Cecil Leavitt when the railroad was finished in 1884.

== Geography ==
Cecil is located at 44°48′34″N 88°27′8″W (44.809442, -88.452323) on the east shore of Shawano Lake.

According to the United States Census Bureau, the village has a total area of 1.80 square miles (4.66 km^{2}), of which 1.79 square miles (4.64 km^{2}) is land and 0.01 square miles (0.03 km^{2}) is water.

== Demographics ==
Historical population
Census	Pop.	Note	%±
1910	351		—
1920	379		8.0%
1930	356		−6.1%
1940	370		3.9%
1950	395		6.8%
1960	357		−9.6%
1970	369		3.4%
1980	445		20.6%
1990	373		−16.2%
2000	466		24.9%
2010	570		22.3%
2020	529		−7.2%
U.S. Decennial Census

=== 2010 census ===
As of the census of 2010, there were 570 people, 262 households, and 162 families living in the village. The population density was 318.4 inhabitants per square mile (122.9/km^{2}). There were 328 housing units at an average density of 183.2 per square mile (70.7/km^{2}). The racial makeup of the village was 93.0% White, 0.2% African American, 4.2% Native American, 1.1% from other races, and 1.6% from two or more races. Hispanic or Latino of any race were 2.1% of the population.

There were 262 households, of which 24.0% had children under the age of 18 living with them, 51.5% were married couples living together, 6.9% had a female householder with no husband present, 3.4% had a male householder with no wife present, and 38.2% were non-families. 28.6% of all households were made up of individuals, and 11.5% had someone living alone who was 65 years of age or older. The average household size was 2.18 and the average family size was 2.63.

The median age in the village was 45.6 years. 17.7% of residents were under the age of 18; 6.9% were between the ages of 18 and 24; 24.1% were from 25 to 44; 31.7% were from 45 to 64; and 19.5% were 65 years of age or older. The gender makeup of the village was 47.5% male and 52.5% female.

=== 2000 census ===
As of the census of 2000, there were 466 people, 199 households, and 148 families living in the village. The population density was 339.0 people per square mile (131.3/km^{2}). There were 246 housing units at an average density of 179.0 per square mile (69.3/km^{2}). The racial makeup of the village was 94.85% White, 3.43% Native American, 0.64% Asian, 0.64% from other races, and 0.43% from two or more races. Hispanic or Latino of any race were 0.64% of the population.

There were 199 households, out of which 24.6% had children under the age of 18 living with them, 62.8% were married couples living together, 8.5% had a female householder with no husband present, and 25.6% were non-families. 22.6% of all households were made up of individuals, and 6.5% had someone living alone who was 65 years of age or older. The average household size was 2.34 and the average family size was 2.70.

In the village, the population was spread out, with 19.7% under the age of 18, 9.4% from 18 to 24, 24.5% from 25 to 44, 24.2% from 45 to 64, and 22.1% who were 65 years of age or older. The median age was 43 years. For every 100 females, there were 96.6 males. For every 100 females age 18 and over, there were 98.9 males.

The median income for a household in the village was $38,958, and the median income for a family was $39,792. Males had a median income of $37,188 versus $23,750 for females. The per capita income for the village was $18,918. About 3.8% of families and 5.7% of the population were below the poverty line, including 10.6% of those under age 18 and 3.5% of those age 65 or over.

== Images ==
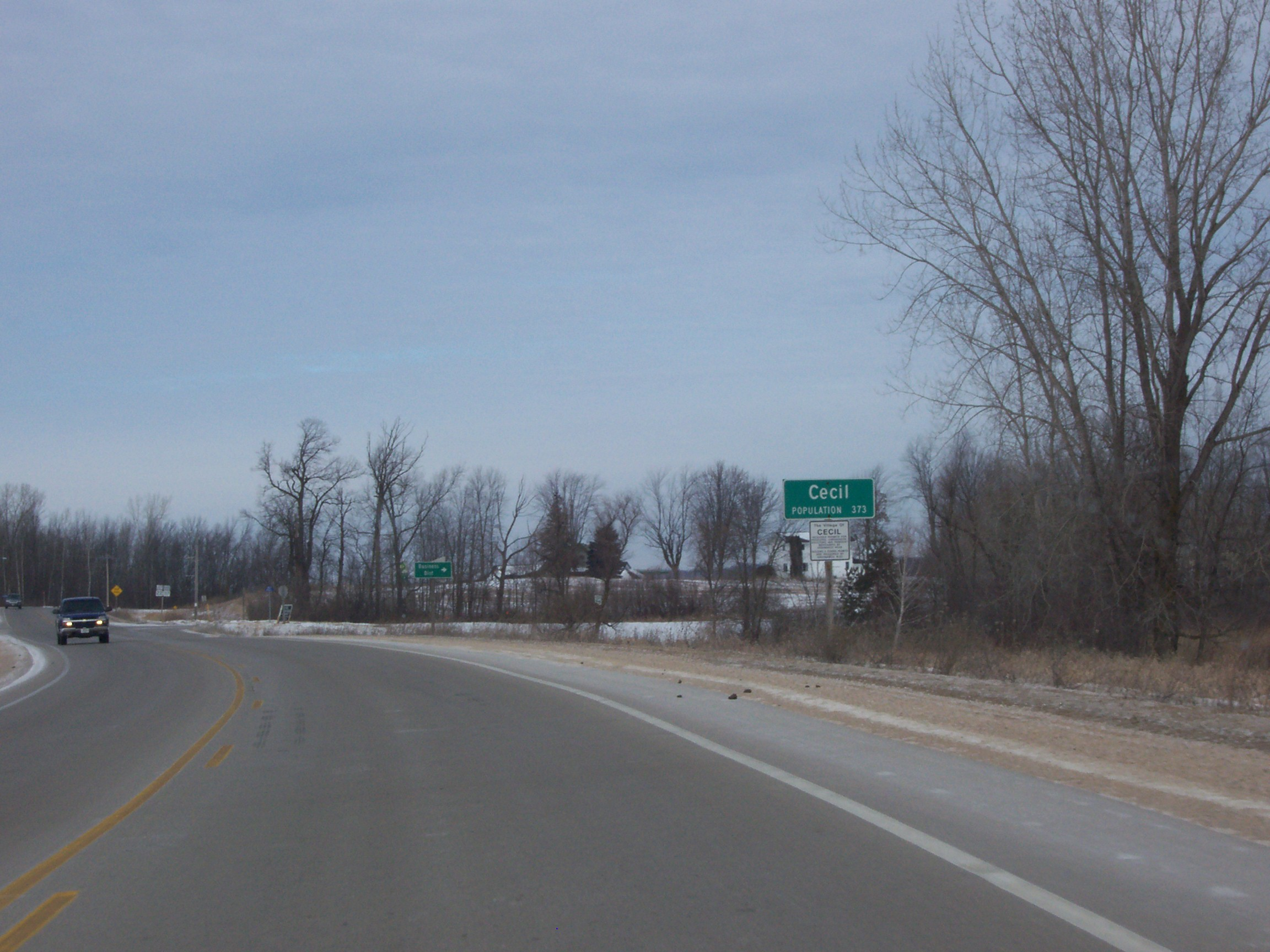
DOT welcome sign

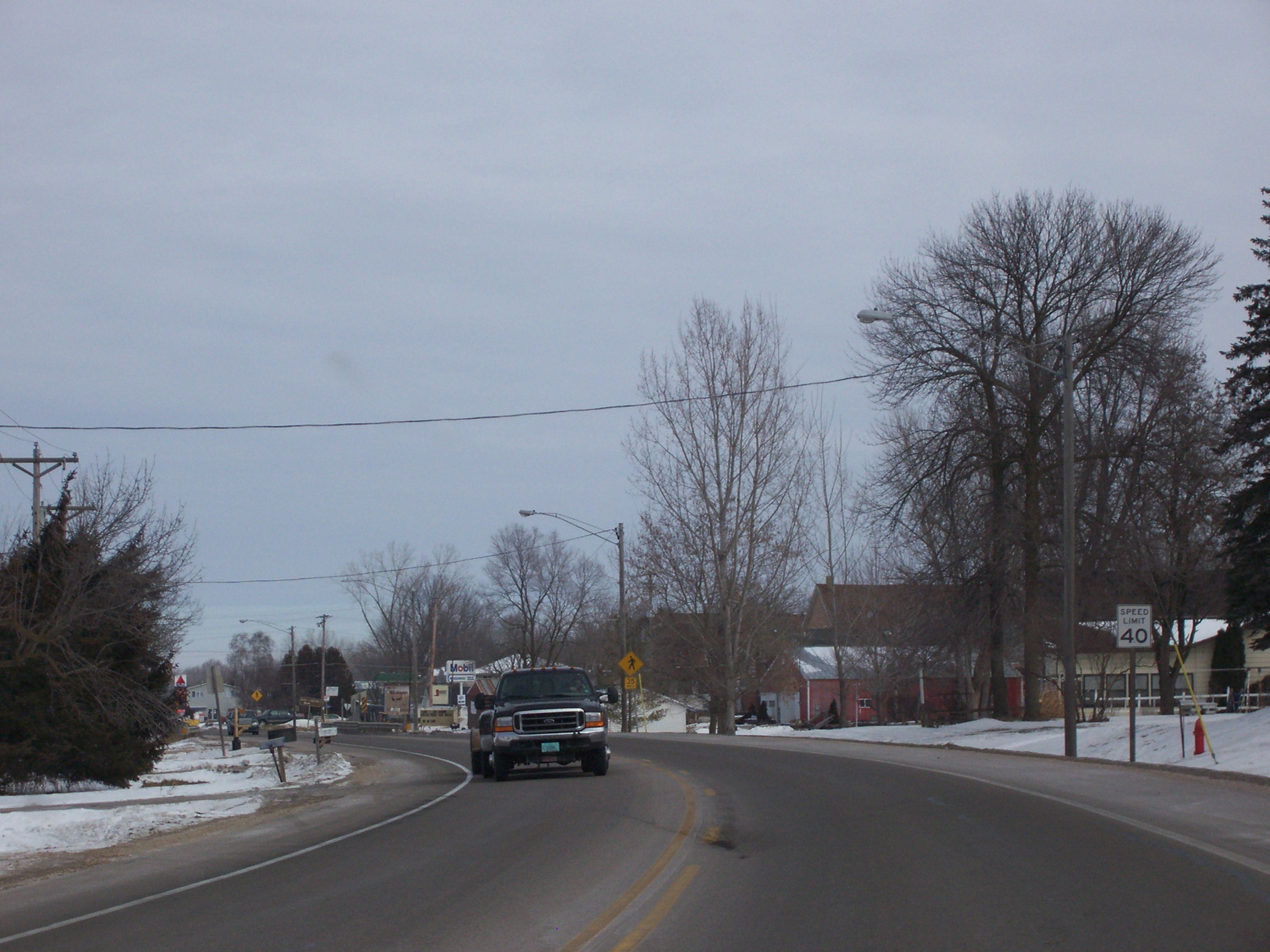
Northbound on WIS 22

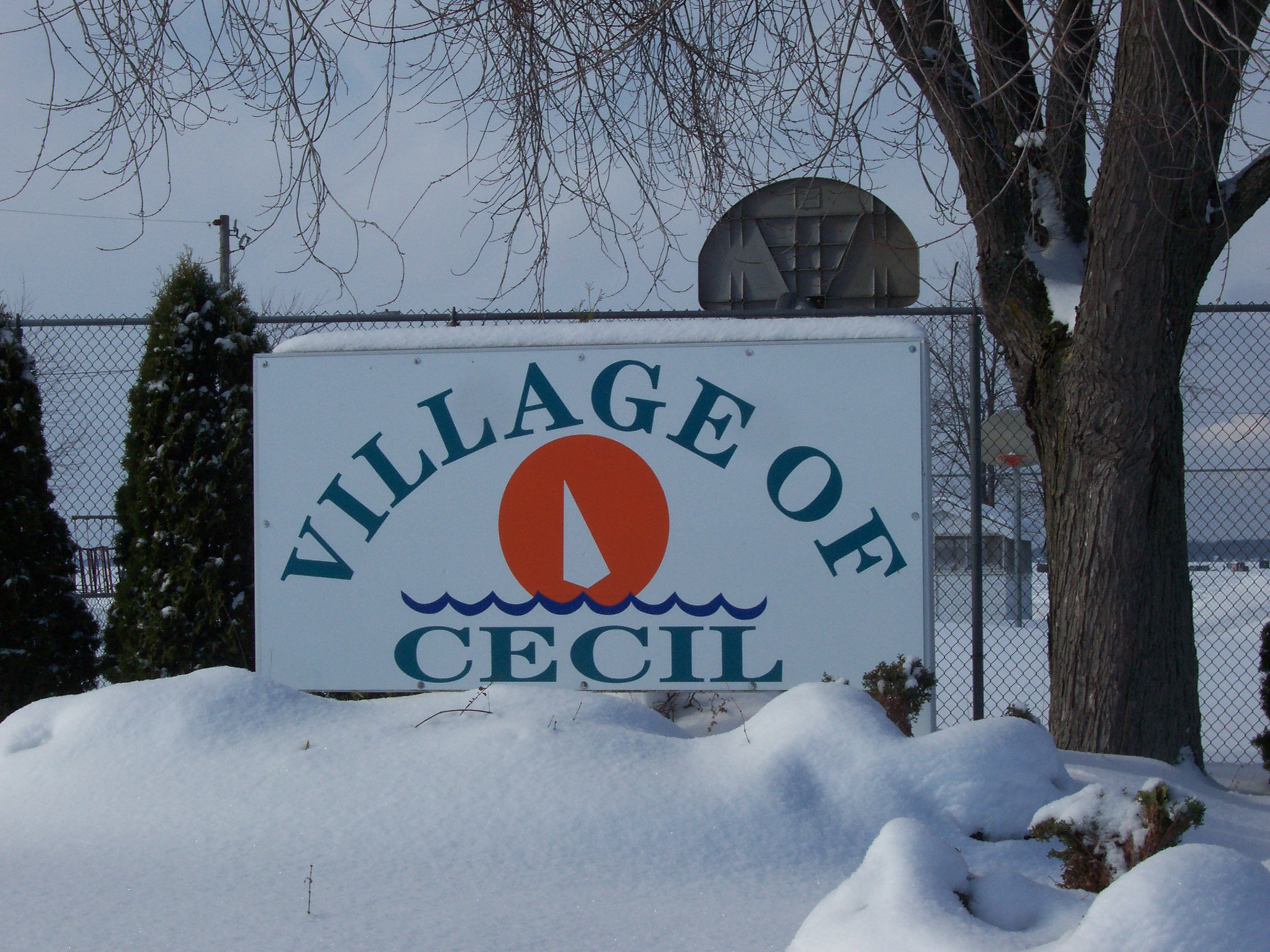
Welcome sign
