= Green Valley, Shawano County, Wisconsin =

Green Valley, Wisconsin
- Town
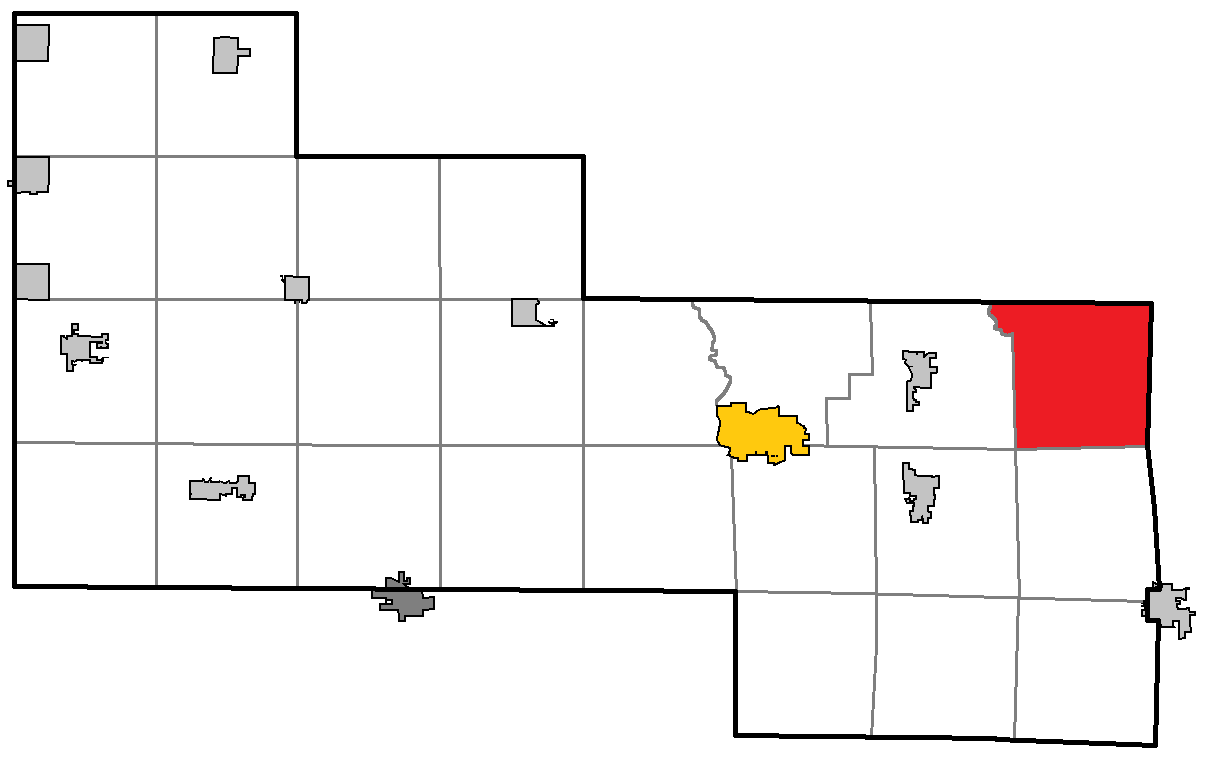
- Location of Green Valley, within Shawano County, Wisconsin
- Coordinates: 44°49′2″N 88°19′16″W
- Country: United States
- State: Wisconsin
- County: Shawano

Area
  - Total: 35.8 sq mi (92.8 km^{2})
  - Land: 35.7 sq mi (92.5 km^{2})
  - Water: 0.12 sq mi (0.3 km^{2})
- Elevation: 801 ft (244 m)

Population (2020)
  - Total: 1,026
  - Density: 28.7/sq mi (11.1/km^{2})
- Time zone: UTC-6 (Central (CST))
  - Summer (DST): UTC-5 (CDT)
- FIPS code: 55-31500
- GNIS feature ID: 1583321
- Website: https://townofgreenvalley.com/

Green Valley is a town in Shawano County, Wisconsin, United States. The population was 1,026 at the 2020 census. The census-designated place of Green Valley and unincorporated communities of Advance and Pulcifer are located in the town.

== Geography ==
According to the United States Census Bureau, the town has a total area of 35.8 square miles (92.8 km^{2}), of which 35.7 square miles (92.5 km^{2}) is land and 0.1 square mile (0.3 km^{2}) (0.36%) is water.

== Demographics ==
As of the census of 2000, there were 1,024 people, 380 households, and 280 families residing in the town. The population density was 28.7 people per square mile (11.1/km^{2}). There were 412 housing units at an average density of 11.5 per square mile (4.5/km^{2}). The racial makeup of the town was 97.56% White, 0.10% African American, 0.49% Native American, 0.98% from other races, and 0.88% from two or more races. Hispanic or Latino of any race were 1.07% of the population.

There were 380 households, out of which 35.5% had children under the age of 18 living with them, 63.7% were married couples living together, 4.7% had a female householder with no husband present, and 26.1% were non-families. 21.8% of all households were made up of individuals, and 13.2% had someone living alone who was 65 years of age or older. The average household size was 2.69 and the average family size was 3.18.

In the town, the population was spread out, with 28.9% under the age of 18, 6.0% from 18 to 24, 29.8% from 25 to 44, 22.1% from 45 to 64, and 13.3% who were 65 years of age or older. The median age was 38 years. For every 100 females, there were 105.6 males. For every 100 females age 18 and over, there were 106.2 males.

The median income for a household in the town was $42,778, and the median income for a family was $48,295. Males had a median income of $32,159 versus $22,986 for females. The per capita income for the town was $17,637. About 4.9% of families and 7.1% of the population were below the poverty line, including 6.1% of those under age 18 and 17.7% of those age 65 or over.
