= Hiram S. Town =

American politician (1833–1901)

Member of the Wisconsin Senate from the 20th district
- In office January 3, 1870 – January 1, 1872
- Preceded by: Edward S. Bragg
- Succeeded by: Joseph Wagner

Sheriff of Fond du Lac County, Wisconsin
- In office January 6, 1868 – January 3, 1870
- Preceded by: John Peacock
- Succeeded by: Mortimer B. Pierce

3rd Mayor of Ripon, Wisconsin
- In office April 1860 – April 1861
- Preceded by: Jehdeiah Bowen
- Succeeded by: Philo England

Personal details
- Born: November 16, 1833 Cornwall, Upper Canada
- Died: July 7, 1901 (aged 68) Port Hudson, Louisiana, U.S.
- Resting place: Hillside Cemetery, Ripon, Wisconsin
- Party: Republican; Whig (before 1854)
- Spouse: Emily Stevens (m. 1855–1901)
- Children: Donald G. Town^{(b. 1857; died 1935)}; Bessie Campbell (Jelleff)^{(b. 1868; died 1956)}

Military service
- Allegiance: United States
- Branch/service: United States Volunteers; Union Army
- Years of service: 1862–1865
- Rank: Major, USV
- Unit: 1st Reg. Wis. Vol. Cavalry
- Battles/wars: American Civil War

Hiram S. Town (January 16, 1833 – July 7, 1901) was an American farmer, politician, and Wisconsin pioneer. He was the 3rd mayor of Ripon, Wisconsin, and represented Fond du Lac County in the Wisconsin State Senate during the 1870 and 1871 sessions. He was one of the founders of the Republican Party and served as a Union Army cavalry officer during the American Civil War.

== Biography ==
Hiram S. Town was born in Cornwall, Upper Canada, in January 1833. As a child, he emigrated to the Wisconsin Territory with his parents in the 1830s, where they first settled in Milwaukee. After his father's death, he moved with his mother and brother to the village of Ceresco, in Fond du Lac County, in 1844. There, they joined the Fourierist (proto-socialist) commune known as the "Wisconsin Phalanx".

He was educated in the public schools and then went to work clerking in a general store owned by William Starr. He took over the store in 1857. Around the same time, the villages of Ceresco and Ripon were incorporated as the city of Ripon, Wisconsin.

In the intervening years, Town became active in local politics as a member of the Whig Party. In the Spring of 1854, he attended the Ripon convention which is considered the founding of the Republican Party.

Town was elected mayor of Ripon in 1860, running on the Republican ticket. After the outbreak of the American Civil War in 1861, he volunteered for service in the Union Army. He was enrolled in Company E of the 1st Wisconsin Cavalry Regiment and commissioned first lieutenant. Within a year, he was promoted to adjutant of the regiment and served in that capacity until the expiration of his enlistment in February 1865.

After the war, Town returned to Fond du Lac County. He was elected sheriff of the county in 1867, and served a two-year term. In 1869 he was elected to the Wisconsin State Senate from Wisconsin's 20th State Senate district, which then comprised all of Fond du Lac County. He served in the 1870 and 1871 sessions, and was not a candidate for re-election in 1871.

Between the 1870 and 1871 sessions, he was appointed postmaster at Ripon, and because he accepted this office, Democrats in Fond du Lac County declared the Senate seat vacant and held an "election" to choose a replacement. The Democratic candidate, John Boyd, petitioned the Senate for his seat, but the Republican majority refused the petition and allowed Town to continue as senator and postmaster.

Town remained postmaster at Ripon for the next decade. He was also active during these years attending to his agricultural pursuits, frequently serving as an officer with the Ripon Agricultural Society. He made a final attempt to run for office in 1877, seeking the Republican nomination for Secretary of State of Wisconsin, but the Republican State Convention selected Hans Warner instead.

In 1886, he moved to Adair, Indian Territory, to work on a contract for railroad construction with his brother, Edward.

Town moved to Kentucky in 1896 when he was appointed superintendent of the Lebanon National Cemetery. He was subsequently appointed superintendent of the Port Hudson National Cemetery, in Port Hudson, Louisiana, in 1900. He died at Port Hudson on July 7, 1901.

Wisconsin Senate
Preceded by Edward S. Bragg	Member of the Wisconsin Senate from the 20th district January 3, 1870 – January 1, 1872	Succeeded by Joseph Wagner
Political offices
Preceded by Jehdeiah Bowen	Mayor of Ripon, Wisconsin; April 1860 – April 1861	Succeeded by Philo England
Legal offices
Preceded by John Peacock	Sheriff of Fond du Lac County, Wisconsin; January 6, 1868 – January 3, 1870	Succeeded by Mortimer B. Pierce
