= Elihu Phillips =

19th century American politician

Elihu Lyman Phillips

Member of the Wisconsin Senate from the 20th district
- In office January 2, 1860 – January 6, 1862
- Preceded by: Edward Pier
- Succeeded by: George W. Mitchell

Member of the New York State Assembly from the Onondaga County district
- In office January 1, 1846 – January 1, 1847 Serving with Lake I. Teft, Julius C. Kinne, & Alonzo Wood
- Preceded by: Julius C. Kinne, Dennis McCarthy, David Preston, & Lake I. Teft
- Succeeded by: William Henderson, John Lakin, Manoah Pratt, & Joseph Prindle

Sheriff of Onondaga County, New York
- In office January 1, 1838 – January 1, 1841
- Preceded by: Dorastus Lawrence
- Succeeded by: Frederick Benson

Personal details
- Born: February 16, 1800 Manlius, New York, U.S.
- Died: January 10, 1884 (aged 83) Fond du Lac, Wisconsin, U.S.
- Resting place: Oakwood Cemetery, Syracuse, New York
- Party: Republican; Whig (before 1854)
- Spouses: Harriet Tousley (m. 1825; died 1825); Eleanor Dashiell (Jones) (m. 1828; died 1838)
- Children: Charles J. Phillips^{(b. 1829; died 1832)}; William E. Phillips^{(b. 1830; died 1831)}; Ellen E. A. Phillips^{(b. 1833; died 1855)}
- Relatives: Lyman Phillips (brother)
- Occupation: Merchant

Elihu Lyman Phillips (February 16, 1800 – January 10, 1884) was an American businessman, politician, and Wisconsin pioneer. He was an early settler of Fond du Lac County, Wisconsin, and represented Fond du Lac County in the Wisconsin Senate during the 1860 and 1861 terms. Before moving to Wisconsin, he served in the New York State Assembly, representing Onondaga County during the 1846 term, and served as sheriff of Onondaga County from 1838 to 1841. His name was often abbreviated as E. L. Phillips.

== Biography ==
=== New York career ===
Elihu Phillips was born in Manlius, Onondaga County, New York, in February 1800. He was the youngest child and seventh son of Elijah Phillips and Susannah Gates. His parents married in 1778 in Preston, Connecticut, and relocated to New Hampshire for a short time toward the end of the American Revolution, before settling further west in what would become Onondaga County, New York, by 1788. His father was a veteran of the American Revolution who had responded to the alarm at Lexington in 1775. Elijah operated mills at Edwards Falls in Manlius and served as the fourth Sheriff of Onondaga County. On his paternal line, Elihu descends from the Rev. George Phillips, who arrived in America in 1630 on the ship Arabella with Governor John Winthrop and established the first Congregational Church at Watertown, Massachusetts. Through his parents, Elihu's ancestors include many early colonists in Connecticut and Massachusetts.

He was raised and educated in Manlius, and at age 16 went to work in a store of owned by Amos P. Granger in Syracuse, New York for a couple years. He returned to Manlius in 1824 to operated a store with Sylvanus Tousley. He then worked in his brother's store for several years from about 1827 to 1831, at which time he opened his own mercantile business in Syracuse. His brother Lyman Hubbard Phillips joined him in the business from 1834 to 1836, and Elihu then partnered with his nephew Nelson Danforth Philips (son of Elihu's brother Elijah, a prominent station agent in Syracuse).

Elihu L. Phillips became active in local politics as an anti-Mason and member of the Whig Party. In 1836, he was designated a commissioner for the establishment of the Syracuse and Utica Railroad. In 1837, he was elected sheriff of Onondaga County (a position that his father previously held; and his brother John Phillips served as Sheriff of Niagara County). He was instrumental in creating Rose Hill Cemetery in Syracuse in 1841. Elihu was elected to the New York State Assembly in 1845, to serve in the 1846 session. After his stint in the New York Assembly, he was appointed to serve as one of the two canal appraiser for the state and served two years in that role. While living in New York, he was also involved in the state militia and held the rank of colonel (his father Elijah Phillips and brother Elijah Phillips were also involved in the New York militia for Onondaga County).

Through the 1840s, Phillips was active in contracting. In 1847, Elihu and his brother Lyman contracted to widen a stretch of the Erie Canal, primarily through Buffalo. Shortly after this, they contracted to build a 60 mile stretch of Great Western Railway from Niagara Falls to the head of Lake Ontario. About 1850 or 1851, the brothers sold their Great Western Railway contract, and took another railroad contract to building a stretch of the Ohio and Mississippi Railway in Ohio.

=== Wisconsin career ===
In 1852, he and his brother, Lyman, moved west to Fond du Lac County, Wisconsin, and settled on farms in the town of Empire. Phillips tended to his farms for about 15 years, then moved his main residence into the city of Fond du Lac, and left his farms in the hands of tenants for the rest of his life.

He quickly became involved in politics with the Republican Party, after it was created in 1854, and was elected president of the Fond du Lac County Republican convention in 1855. In 1859, he was nearly nominated for Lieutenant Governor of Wisconsin at the Republican state convention. He led in the first two rounds of balloting, falling 8 votes short of a majority in both votes. In the third round, Butler Noble overtook Phillips and secured the nomination. Phillips subsequently received the Republican nomination for Wisconsin Senate in the 20th Senate district, which then comprised just his home county of Fond du Lac. He defeated Democrat D. E. Hoskins in the general election and went on to serve in the 1860 and 1861 legislative sessions.

Around 1860, his hearing began to fail, and he began withdrawing from public life. He did not run for re-election to the State Senate in 1861, but was subsequently appointed Provost Marshal of the Fond du Lac district under the Enrollment Act, in the midst of the American Civil War. Among Wisconsin districts, Phillips had an outstanding record of enrolling volunteers and conscripts for the Union Army.

Elihu L. Phillips, along with 49 other men, became one of the original incorporators of the Union Pacific Rail Road, when it was chartered by the U.S. Congress through the Pacific Railroad Act of 1862. As such, he initially owned a two percent stake in the railroad

During the Civil War, he rented his farm out to Col. B. T. Miller and lived with John Peacock in Fond du Lac, finally selling the farm in 1865, at which time he moved in with his brother Lyman before purchasing the "Sawyer House" on Division Street in Fond du Lac, but continued oversee another farm he owned in Lamartine Township.

In 1867, he secured a charter for the Fond du Lac Savings Bank and served two years as president of the bank.

Elihu Lyman Phillips died at his home in Fond du Lac on January 10, 1884. He had been in poor health and was very hard of hearing and withdrawn from society for several years before his death. His long-time housekeeper and his nieces and nephews who survived him inherited his estate.

== Personal life and family ==
Phillips worked closely with his brother, Lyman Hubbard Phillips, for much of his life.

Elihu Phillips was married twice. He married Harriet Tousley in 1825, but she died just six months later. In 1828, he married Eleanor (Dashiell) Jones, who died in 1838. With his second wife, he had three children, but none survived him: His son Charles J. Phillips was born in 1829 and died at the age of 2 in 1832. His son William E. Phillips was born in 1830 and died at the age of 7 months in 1831. Another son died in infancy in 1831. His daughter Ellen A. Phillips was born in 1833 and died at the age of 22 in 1855.

Although he was survived by numerous nieces and nephews who were spread out from western New York to Washington Territory, his nearest relative at his death was his niece, Susan, a daughter of Lyman H. Phillips, who was then the wife of Edward Colman. Susan and her husband escorted his body back to Syracuse, New York, for burial next to his second wife and children in Oakwood Cemetery.

New York State Assembly
Preceded by Julius C. Kinne, Dennis McCarthy, David Preston, & Lake I. Teft	Member of the New York State Assembly from the Onondaga County district January 1, 1846 – January 1, 1847; Served alongside: Lake I. Teft, Julius C. Kinne, & Alonzo Wood	Succeeded by William Henderson, John Lakin, Manoah Pratt, & Joseph Prindle
Wisconsin Senate
Preceded by Edward Pier	Member of the Wisconsin Senate from the 20th district January 2, 1860 – January 6, 1862	Succeeded by George W. Mitchell
Legal offices
Preceded by Dorastus Lawrence	Sheriff of Onondaga County, New York; January 1, 1838 – January 1, 1841	Succeeded by Frederick Benson
