= George F. Wheeler =

19th century American politician

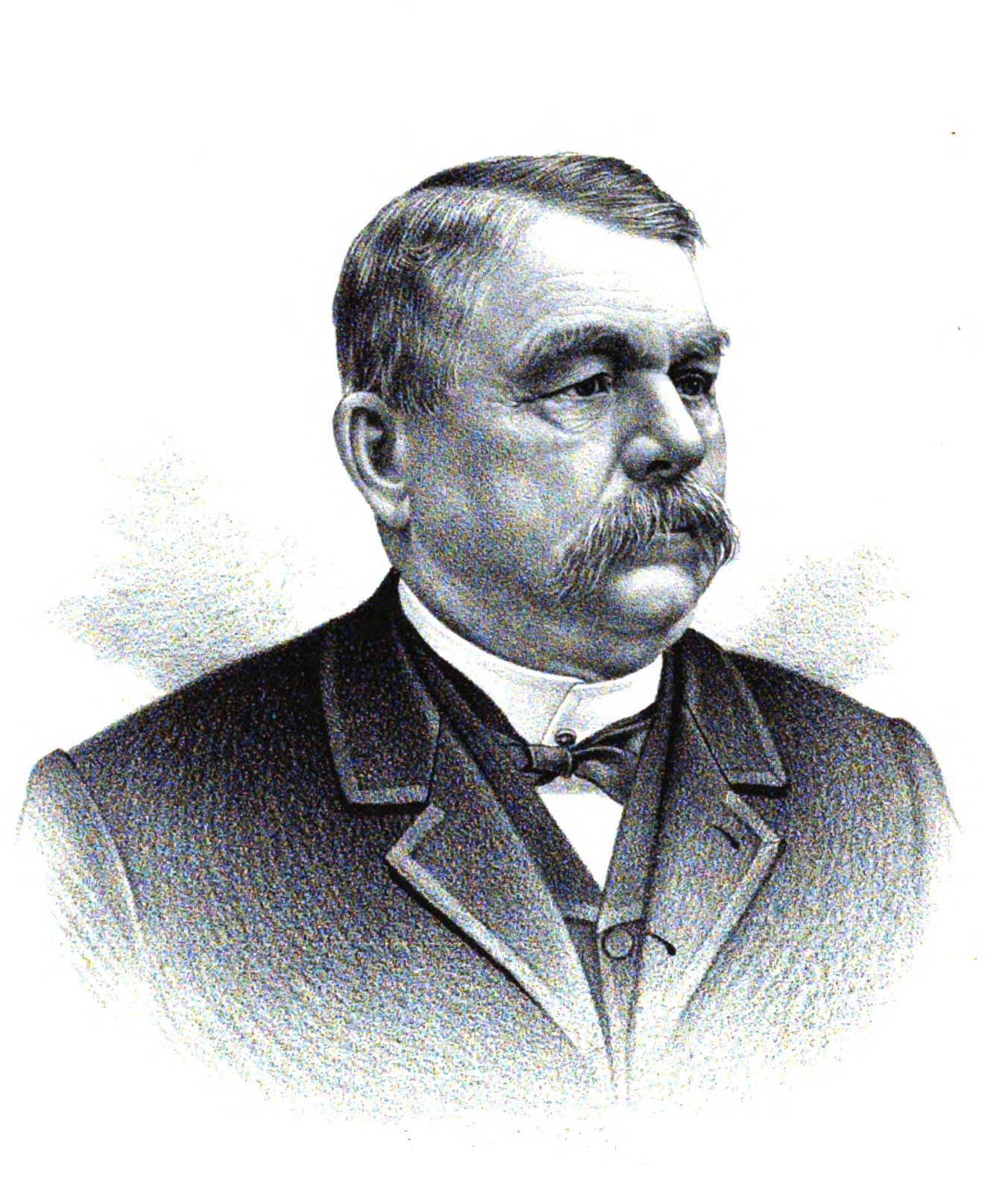
- From Portrait and biographical album of Fond du Lac County, Wisconsin (1889)

9th Prison Commissioner of Wisconsin
- In office January 3, 1870 – January 5, 1874
- Governor: Lucius Fairchild; Cadwallader C. Washburn
- Preceded by: Henry Cordier
- Succeeded by: Position abolished

President pro tempore of the Wisconsin Senate
- In office January 9, 1867 – January 8, 1868
- Preceded by: Willard H. Chandler
- Succeeded by: Newton Littlejohn

Member of the Wisconsin Senate from the 20th district
- In office January 4, 1864 – January 6, 1868
- Preceded by: George W. Mitchell
- Succeeded by: Edward S. Bragg

Sheriff of Fond du Lac County, Wisconsin
- In office January 7, 1861 – January 5, 1863
- Preceded by: Andrews Burnham Jr.
- Succeeded by: J. D. L. Eyclesheimer

Personal details
- Born: December 23, 1824 New Haven, Vermont, U.S.
- Died: April 25, 1903 (aged 78) Los Angeles, California, U.S.
- Resting place: Waupun, Wisconsin
- Party: Republican
- Spouses: Sara C. Enos (m. 1849; died 1881); Helen M. S. (Capron) (m. 1883–1903)
- Children: none
- Occupation: Banker

George Foster Wheeler (December 23, 1824 – April 25, 1903) was an American businessman, politician, and Wisconsin pioneer. He served as prison commissioner of Wisconsin from 1870 to 1874. He also served four years in the Wisconsin State Senate, and was sheriff of Fond du Lac County.

== Biography ==
George Wheeler was born in New Haven, Vermont, on December 23, 1824. He was educated in the common schools of that area and attended the Middlebury Academy in Middlebury, Vermont. As a young man, he went to work at a wool mill in Middlebury, working his way up from laboring to become a partner in the ownership of the mill.

In 1854, he decided to move west to the new state of Wisconsin. He traveled there and purchased a farm in Springvale, Fond du Lac County.

He was a staunch Republican since the organization of that party in the 1850s. As a Republican, he was elected to the town board and served as town chairman in 1859. The next year, he was elected sheriff of Fond du Lac County. While serving as sheriff, he also enrolled in the Wisconsin militia due to the outbreak of the American Civil War, though he did not volunteer for federal service.

He was elected to the Wisconsin State Senate in 1863 and 1865, serving four years, and was elected by his colleagues as president pro tempore of the Senate for the 1867 session.

In 1869, he was appointed deputy U.S. marshal for Wisconsin, and later that year he was elected state prison commissioner. He was re-elected to another two-year term in 1871. The office was abolished at the end of his second term, replaced by a panel of three commissioners appointed by the governor.

After leaving office, he retired from political life and focused on his business career. He became a partner in a manufacturing company known as Althouse, Wheeler & Co., and remained a shareholder of the company until his death. He also became invested in the Northwestern Mutual Life Insurance Company and served on the board of trustees until his death—he was considered an expert in farm value securities. He was also an investor in the First National Bank of Waupun, where he was appointed cashier in 1887, and later became president.

After an illness, Wheeler took a trip to California to try to improve his health. He died in Los Angeles, California, on April 25, 1903.

== Personal life and family ==
George F. Wheeler was one of twelve children born to Moses F. and Mary A. Wheeler (née Perry). Moses Wheeler was a soldier in the War of 1812 and owned a farm in New Haven, Vermont.

George F. Wheeler was married twice. His first wife was Sara C. Enos of Vermont; they were wed on December 26, 1849. After 31 years of marriage, Sara Wheeler died in October 1881. Two years later, George Wheeler married the widow Helen M. S. Capron (née Sinclair), who survived him. George Wheeler had no known children.

Wheeler was also active in Freemasonry, and was described as a close friend of Wisconsin's Philetus Sawyer (U.S. senator 1881–1893).

== Electoral history ==
=== Wisconsin Prison Commissioner (1869, 1871) ===
Wisconsin Prison Commissioner Election, 1869
Party	Candidate	Votes	%	±%
General Election, November 2, 1869
Republican	George F. Wheeler	69,897	53.53%	+1.31%
Democratic	Carl M. Bordoe	60,675	46.47%	
Plurality		9,222	7.06%	+2.63%
Total votes		130,572	100.0%	-8.14%
Republican hold				

Wisconsin Prison Commissioner Election, 1871
Party	Candidate	Votes	%	±%
General Election, November 7, 1871
Republican	George F. Wheeler (incumbent)	78,915	53.40%	−0.14%
Democratic	Lars E. Johnson	68,876	46.60%	
Plurality		10,039	6.79%	-0.27%
Total votes		147,791	100.0%	+13.19%
Republican hold				

Wisconsin Senate
Preceded by George W. Mitchell	Member of the Wisconsin Senate from the 20th district January 4, 1864 – January 6, 1868	Succeeded by Edward S. Bragg
Preceded by Willard H. Chandler	President pro tempore of the Wisconsin Senate; January 9, 1867 – January 8, 1868	Succeeded by Newton Littlejohn
Political offices
Preceded by Henry Cordier	Prison Commissioner of Wisconsin; January 3, 1870 – January 5, 1874	Position abolished
Legal offices
Preceded by Andrews Burnham Jr.	Sheriff of Fond du Lac County, Wisconsin; January 7, 1861 – January 5, 1863	Succeeded by J. D. L. Eyclesheimer
