= Charles A. Eldredge =

American politician (1820–1896)

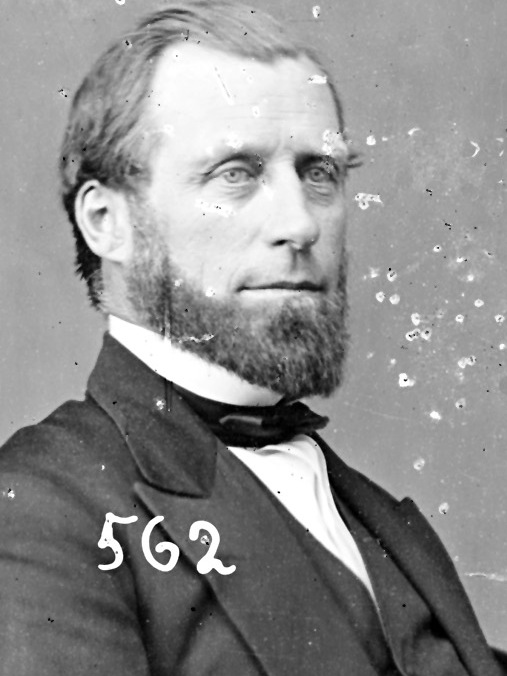

Member of the U.S. House of Representatives from Wisconsin
- In office March 4, 1863 – March 3, 1875
- Preceded by: District established (4th); Philetus Sawyer (5th)
- Succeeded by: Alexander Mitchell (4th); Samuel D. Burchard (5th)
- Constituency: 4th district (1863-73); 5th district (1873-75)

Member of the Wisconsin Senate from the 20th district
- In office January 2, 1854 – January 7, 1856
- Preceded by: Bertine Pinckney
- Succeeded by: Edward Pier

Personal details
- Born: February 27, 1820 Bridport, Vermont, U.S.
- Died: October 26, 1896 (aged 76) Fond du Lac, Wisconsin, U.S.
- Party: Democratic
- Occupation: Lawyer

Charles Augustus Eldredge (February 27, 1820 – October 26, 1896) was an American lawyer and Democratic politician. He served six terms in the United States House of Representatives (1863–1875), representing eastern Wisconsin.

== Biography ==
Born in 1820 in Bridport, Vermont, Eldredge moved with his parents to Canton, New York, in 1825. He attended common schools there and studied law. He was admitted to the bar in 1846 and established a practice in Canton. In 1848, he moved to the new state of Wisconsin, settling at Fond du Lac, where he resumed his legal practice. From Fond du Lac County, he was elected as a Democrat to the Wisconsin State Senate for the 1854 and 1855 sessions.

In 1862, after Wisconsin's congressional delegation was expanded from three seats to six, Eldredge was elected to the 38th United States Congress as the first representative of Wisconsin's 4th congressional district, which at the time comprised the counties of Ozaukee, Washington, Dodge, Fond du Lac, and Sheboygan. In the midst of the American Civil War, he ran as an anti-war Democrat and defeated War Democrat Edward S. Bragg. Bragg engaged in a years-long feud with Eldredge and challenged him in several Democratic nominating conventions. Nevertheless, Eldredge was able to win reelection four times in the 4th congressional district, and won a sixth term in the 5th congressional district after redistricting. In 1874, however, Bragg was able to win enough delegates to prevent Eldredge from being renominated for a seventh term, though Bragg did not benefit, as the nomination instead went to Samuel D. Burchard. Eldredge left office in March 1875 after twelve years in Congress.

He resumed the practice of law.

He died in Fond du Lac, Wisconsin, October 26, 1896, and was interred at Fond du Lac's Rienzi Cemetery.

Wisconsin Senate
| Preceded by Bertine Pinckney | Member of the Wisconsin Senate from the 20th district January 2, 1854 – January 7, 1856 | Succeeded by Edward Pier |
U.S. House of Representatives
| New district | Member of the U.S. House of Representatives from Wisconsin's 4th congressional district March 4, 1863 – March 3, 1873 | Succeeded by Alexander Mitchell |
| Preceded by Philetus Sawyer | Member of the U.S. House of Representatives from Wisconsin's 5th congressional district March 4, 1873 – March 3, 1875 | Succeeded by Samuel D. Burchard |
