= Wisconsin's 20th Senate district =

American legislative district in eastern Wisconsin

Wisconsin's 20th State Senate district
- 2024 map defined in 2023 Wisc. Act 94; 2022 map defined in Johnson v. Wisconsin Elections Commission; 2011 map was defined in 2011 Wisc. Act 43 composed of Assembly districts 58, 59, and 60
Senator
Dan Feyen; R–Fond du Lac
since January 6, 2025 (1 year, 52 days)
- Demographics: 90.81% White; 1.83% Black; 4.11% Hispanic; 1.3% Asian; 1.54% Native American; 0.08% Hawaiian/Pacific Islander
- Population (2020) • Voting age: 178,127; 140,204
- Website: Official website
- Notes: Eastern Wisconsin

The 20th Senate district of Wisconsin is one of 33 districts in the Wisconsin Senate. Located in eastern Wisconsin, the district comprises most of Washington County, northern Ozaukee County, and parts of southern Sheboygan County, eastern Fond du Lac County, and eastern Dodge County. It includes the cities of Fond du Lac and West Bend, and the villages of Belgium, Cedar Grove, Fredonia, North Fond du Lac, Saukville, and Slinger.

== Current elected officials ==
Dan Feyen is the senator representing the 20th district. He was first elected in 2016 in the 18th Senate district, but ran for election in the 20th district after the 2024 redistricting.

Each Wisconsin State Senate district is composed of three State Assembly districts. The 20th Senate district comprises the 58th, 59th, and 60th Assembly districts. The current representatives of those districts are:

- Assembly District 58: Rick Gundrum (R–Slinger)
- Assembly District 59: Robert Brooks (R–Saukville)
- Assembly District 60: Jerry L. O'Connor (R–Fond du Lac)

The 20th Senate district, in its current borders, crosses two congressional districts. The portion of the district in Dodge and Washington counties falls within Wisconsin's 5th congressional district, which is represented by U.S. Representative Scott L. Fitzgerald. The remainder of the district, in Ozaukee, Sheboygan, and Fond du Lac counties, falls within Wisconsin's 6th congressional district, represented by U.S. Representative Glenn Grothman.

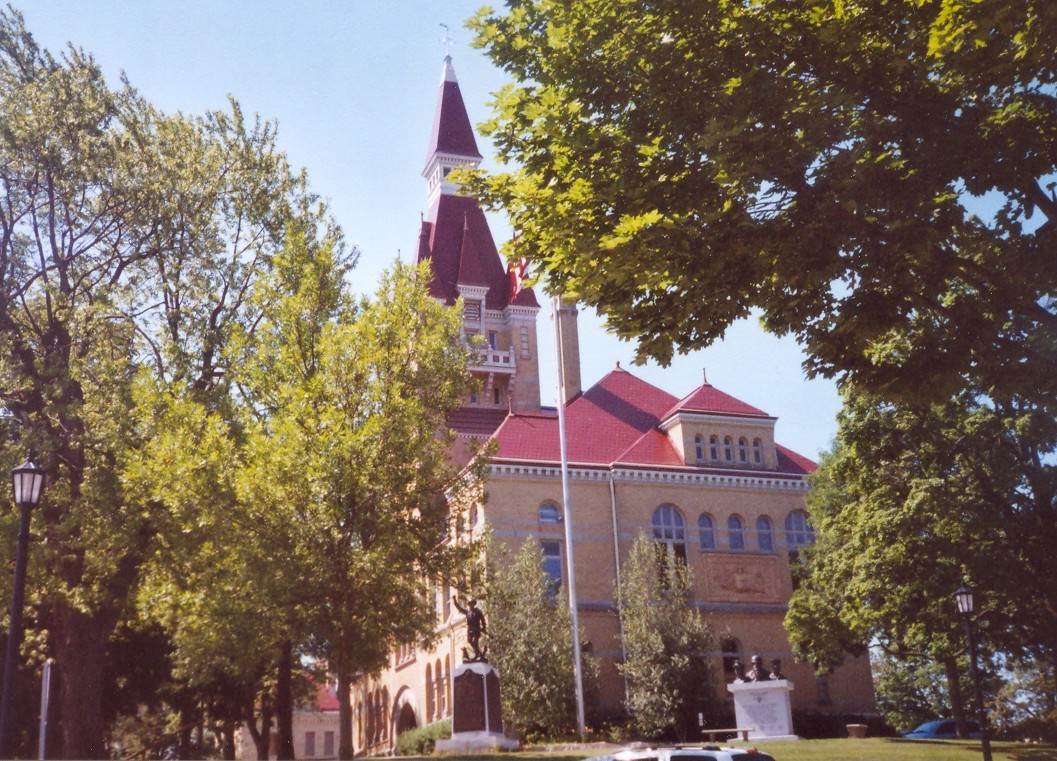
Washington County courthouse in West Bend

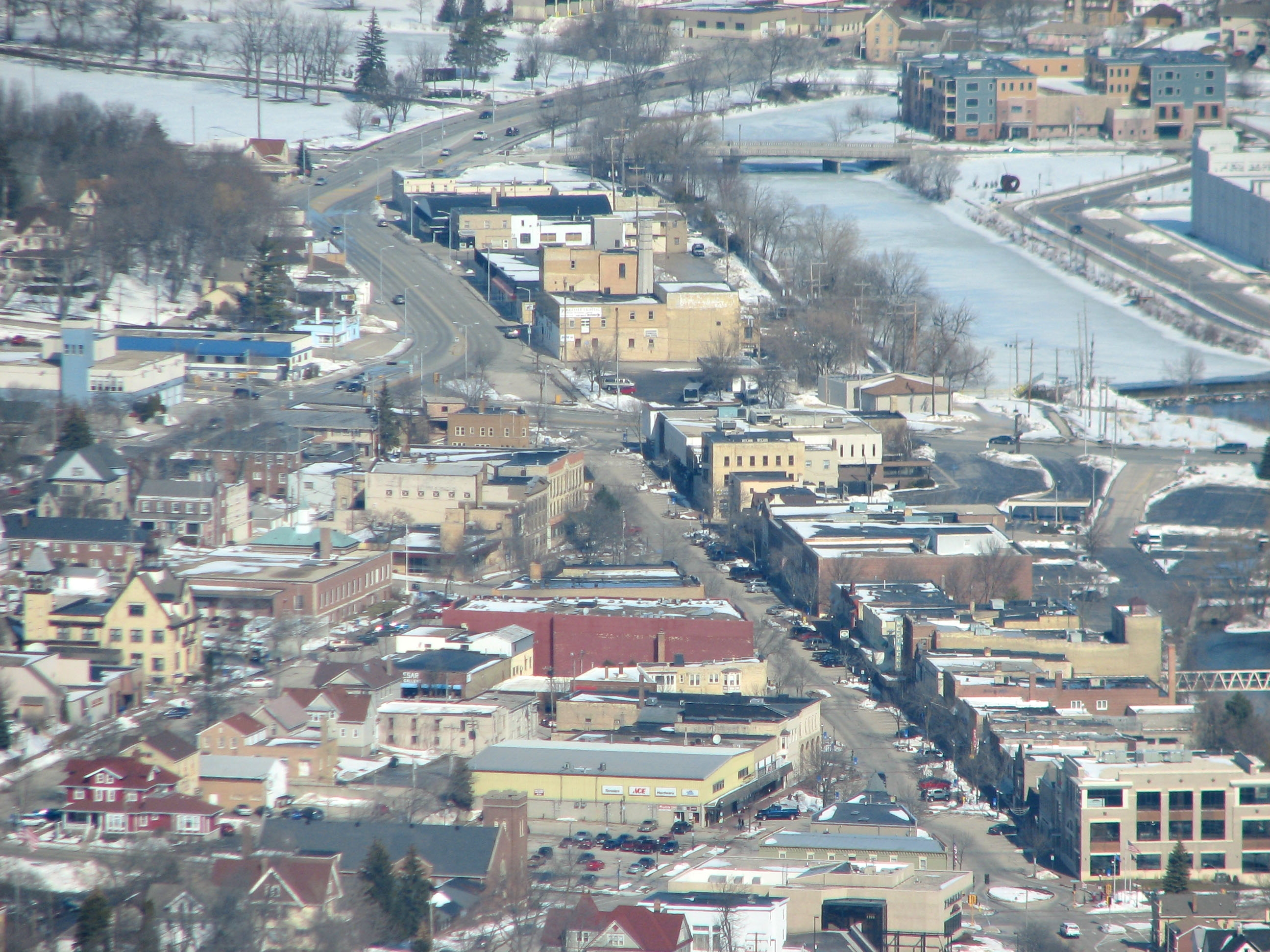
Aerial view of West Bend

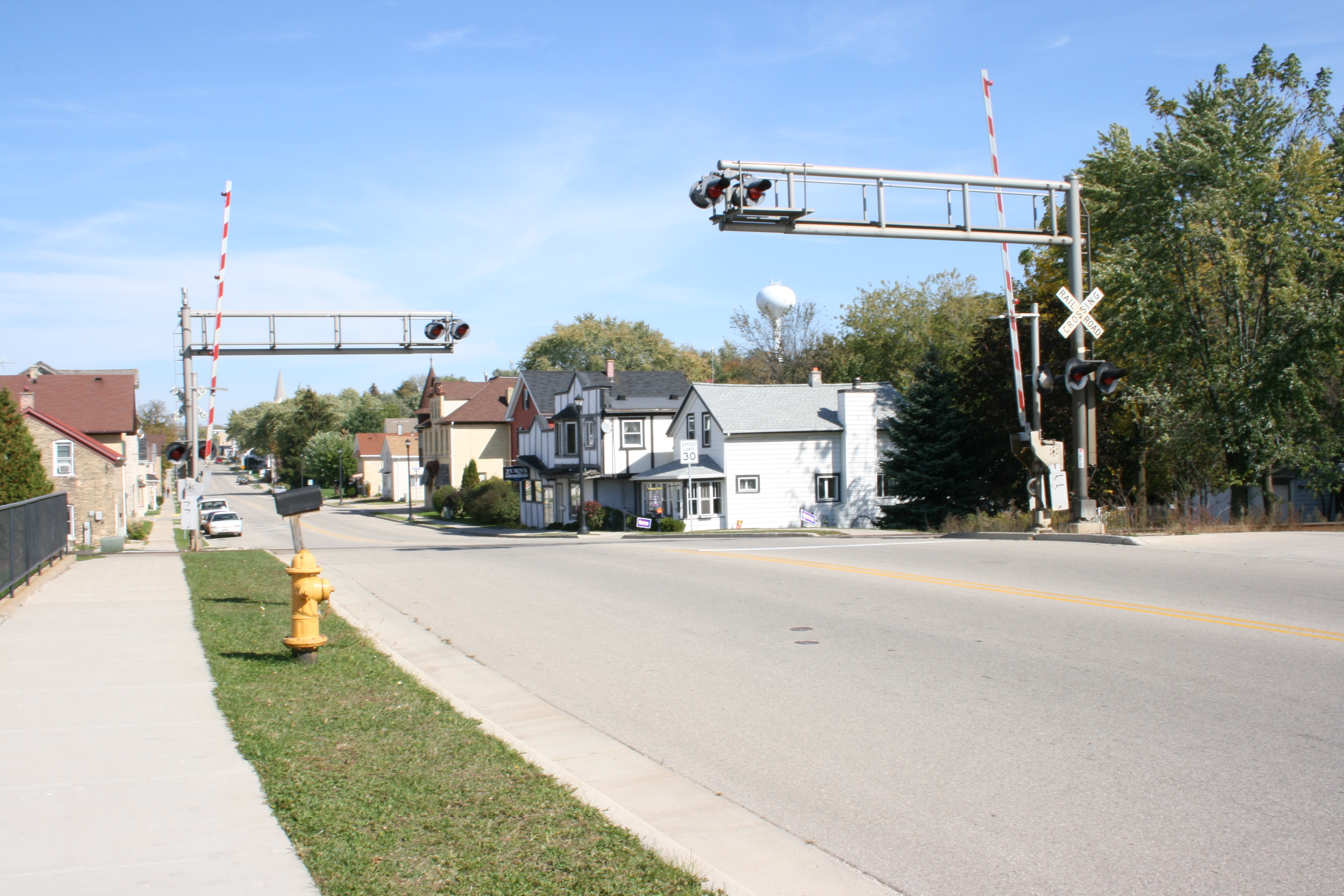
Downtown Slinger

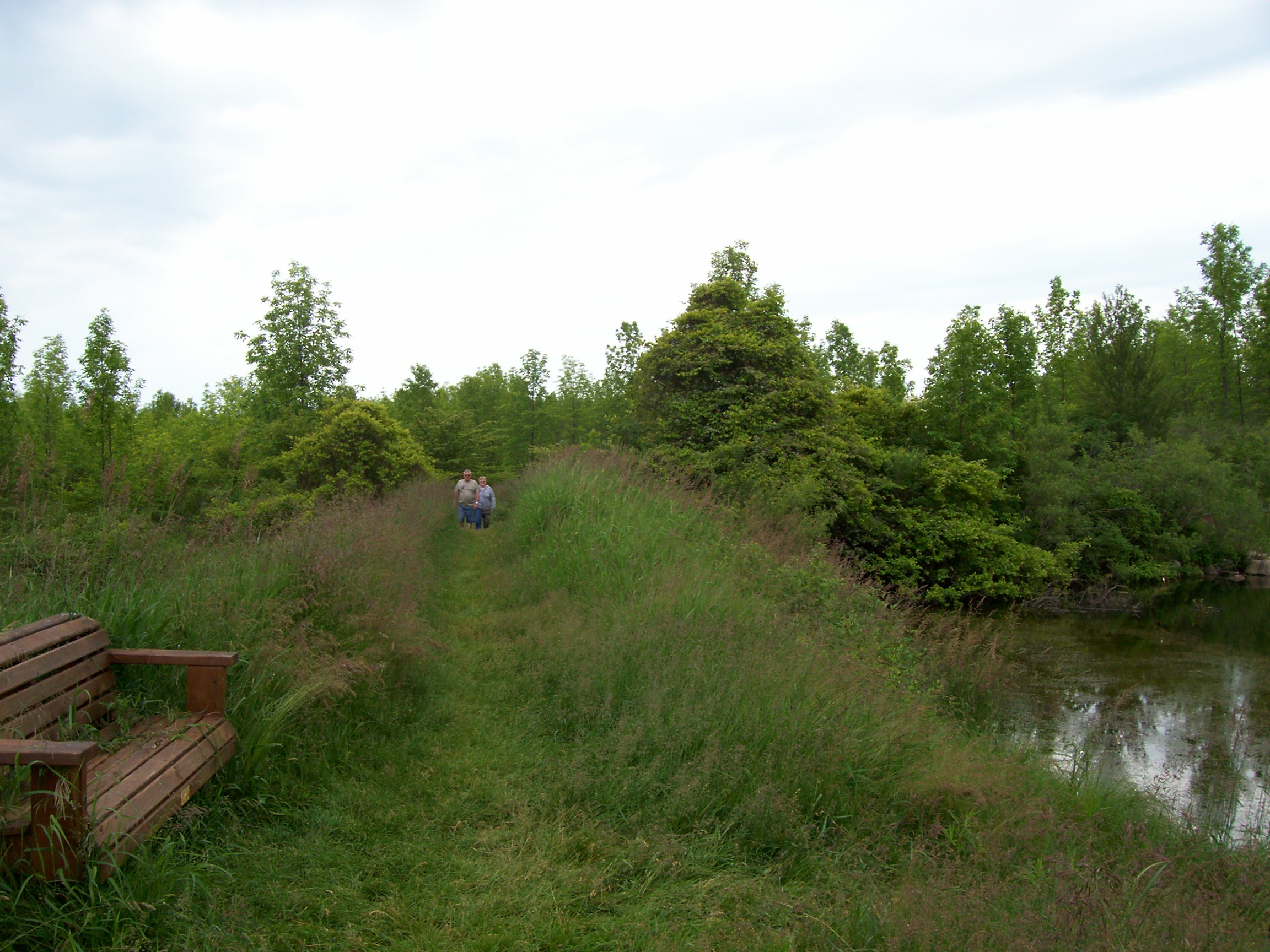
Harrington Beach State Park

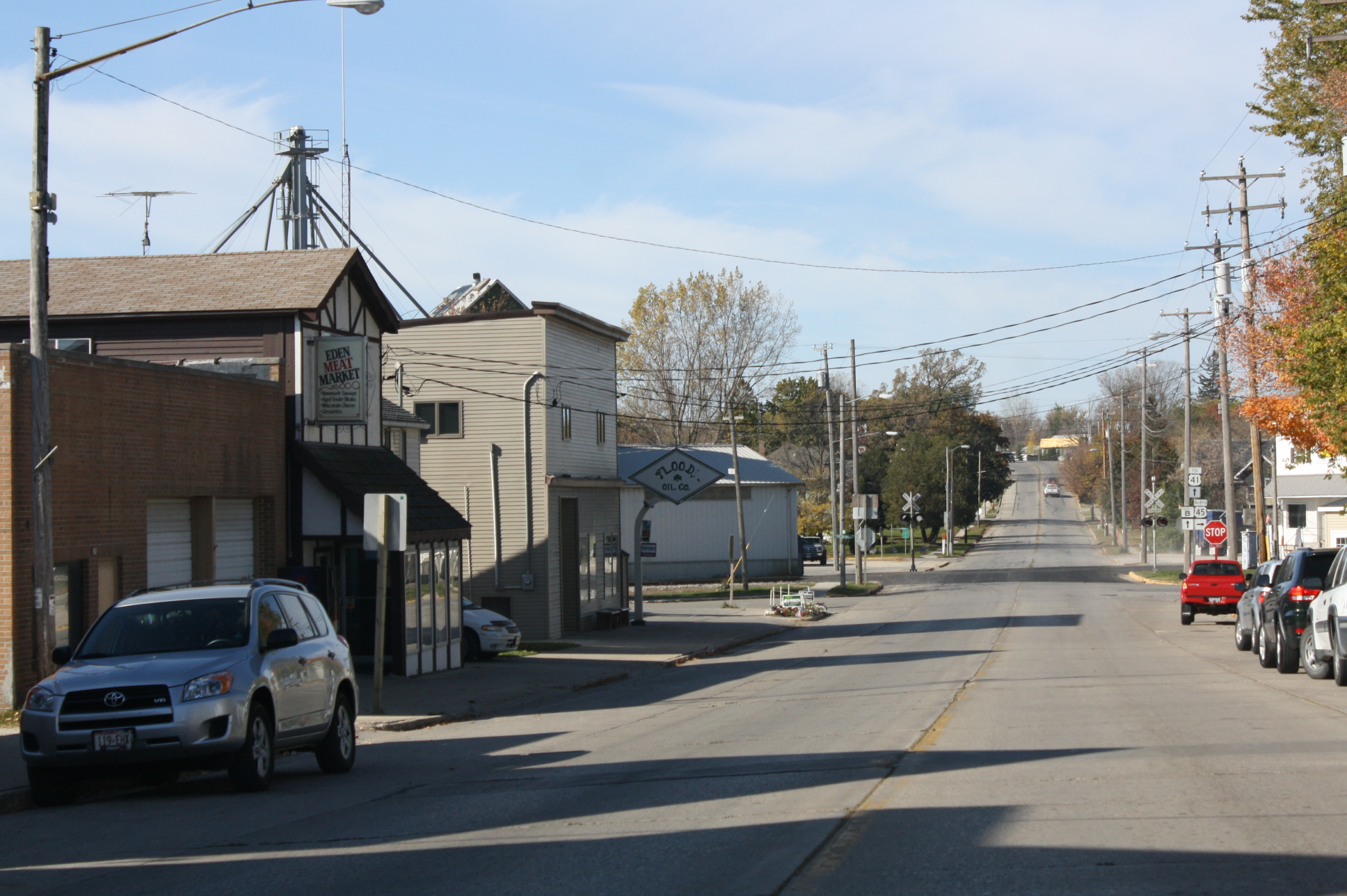
Eden

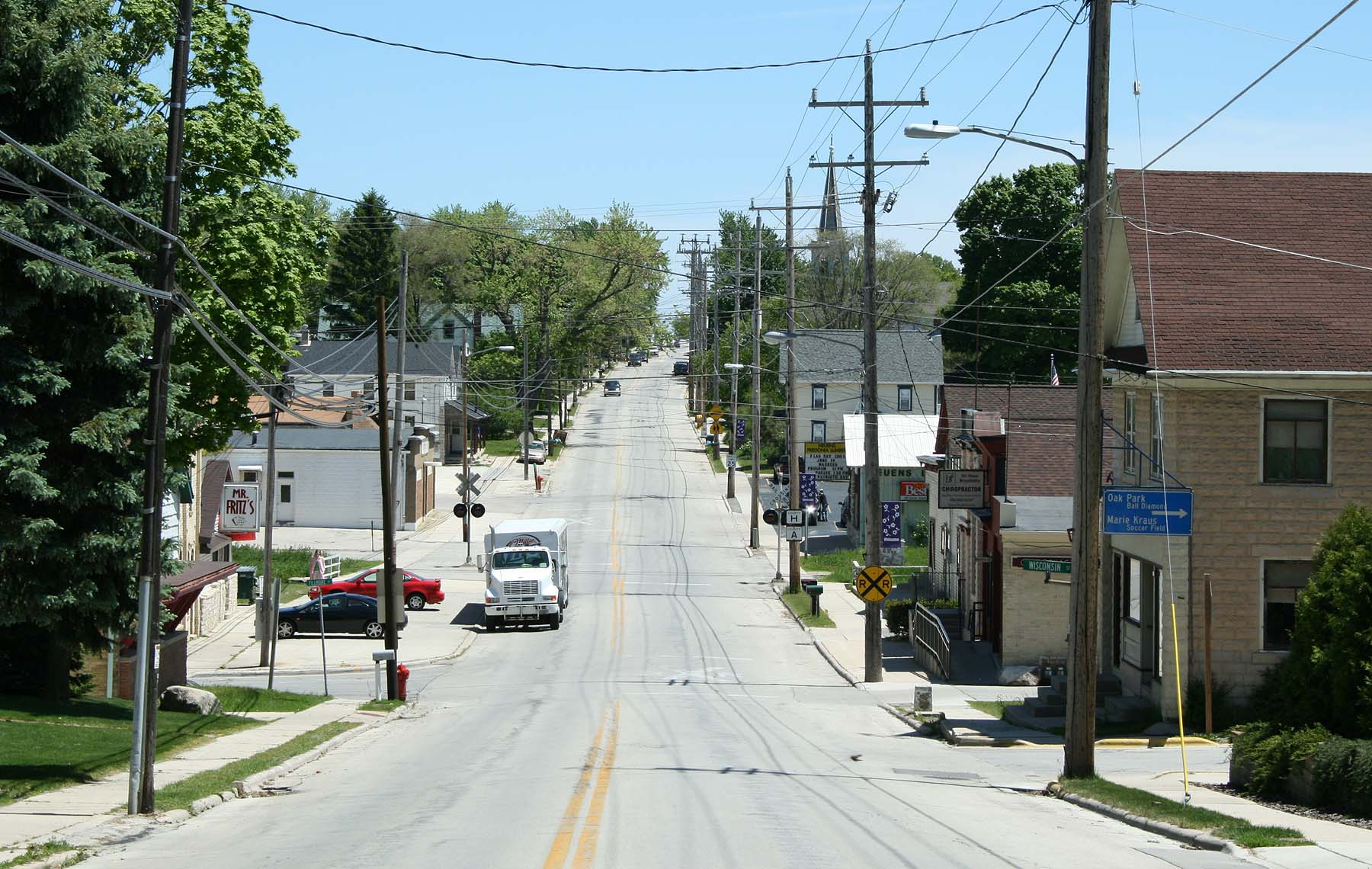
Fredonia

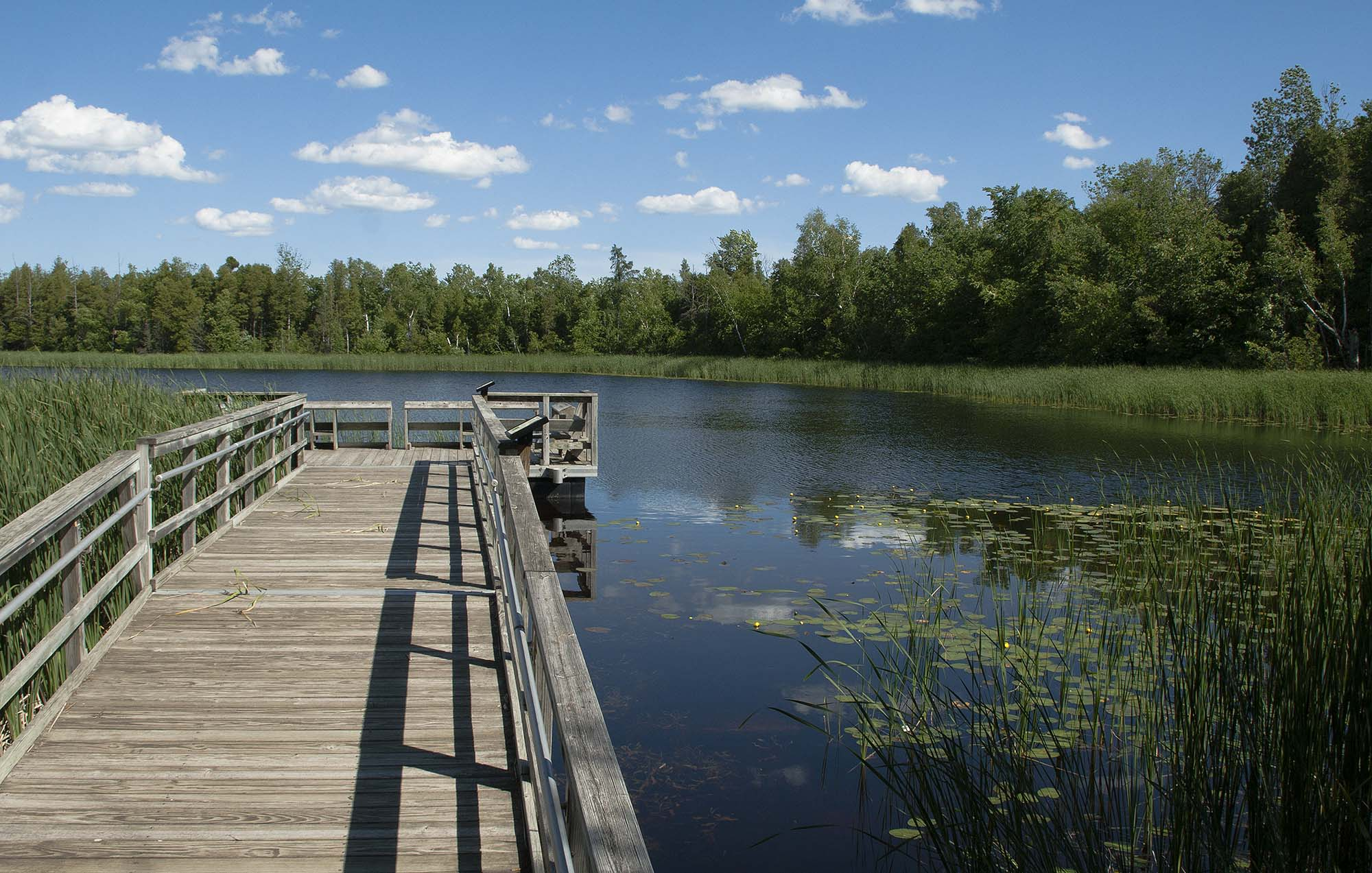
Cedarburg Bog

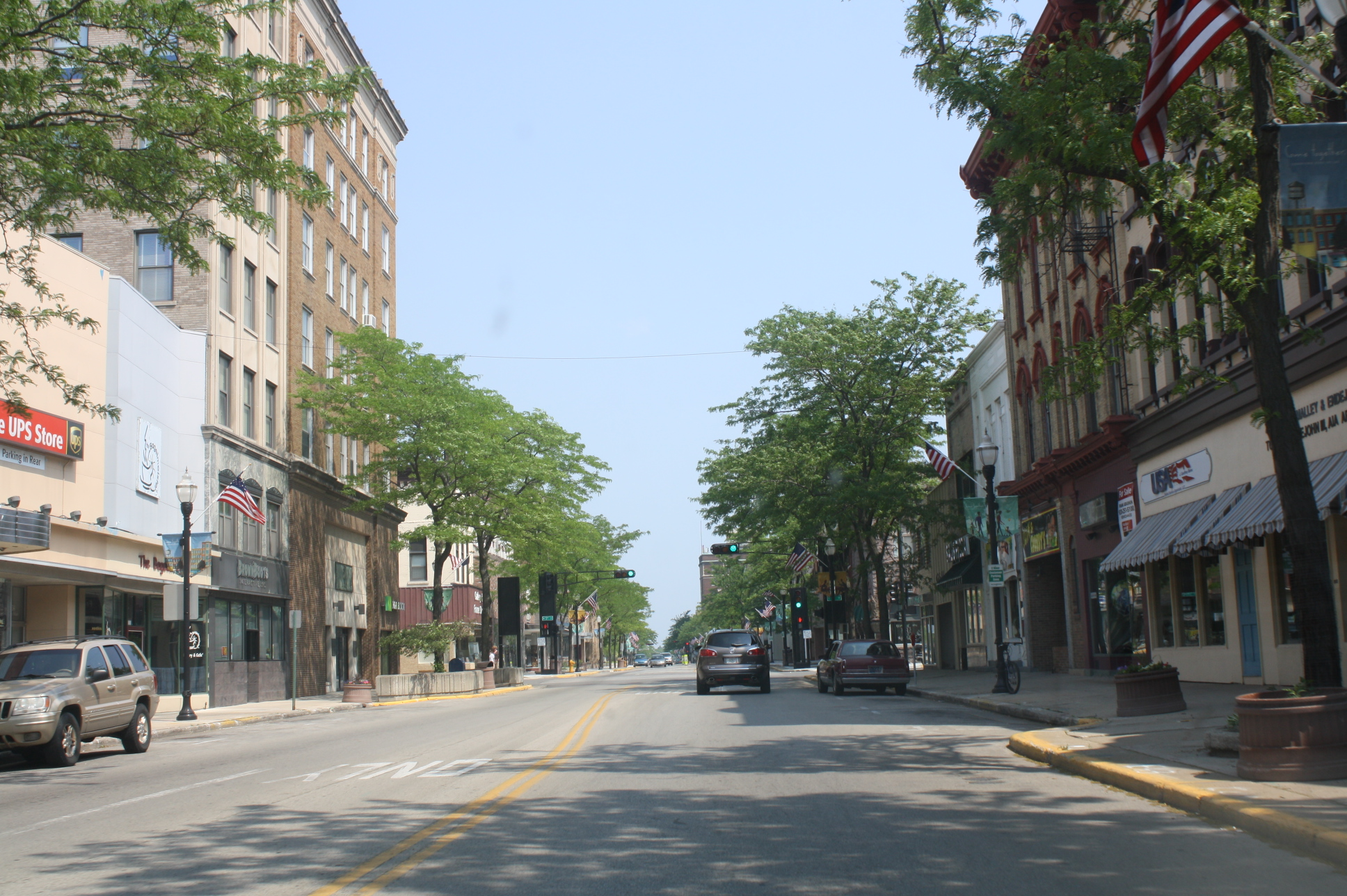
South Main Street Historic District in Fond du Lac

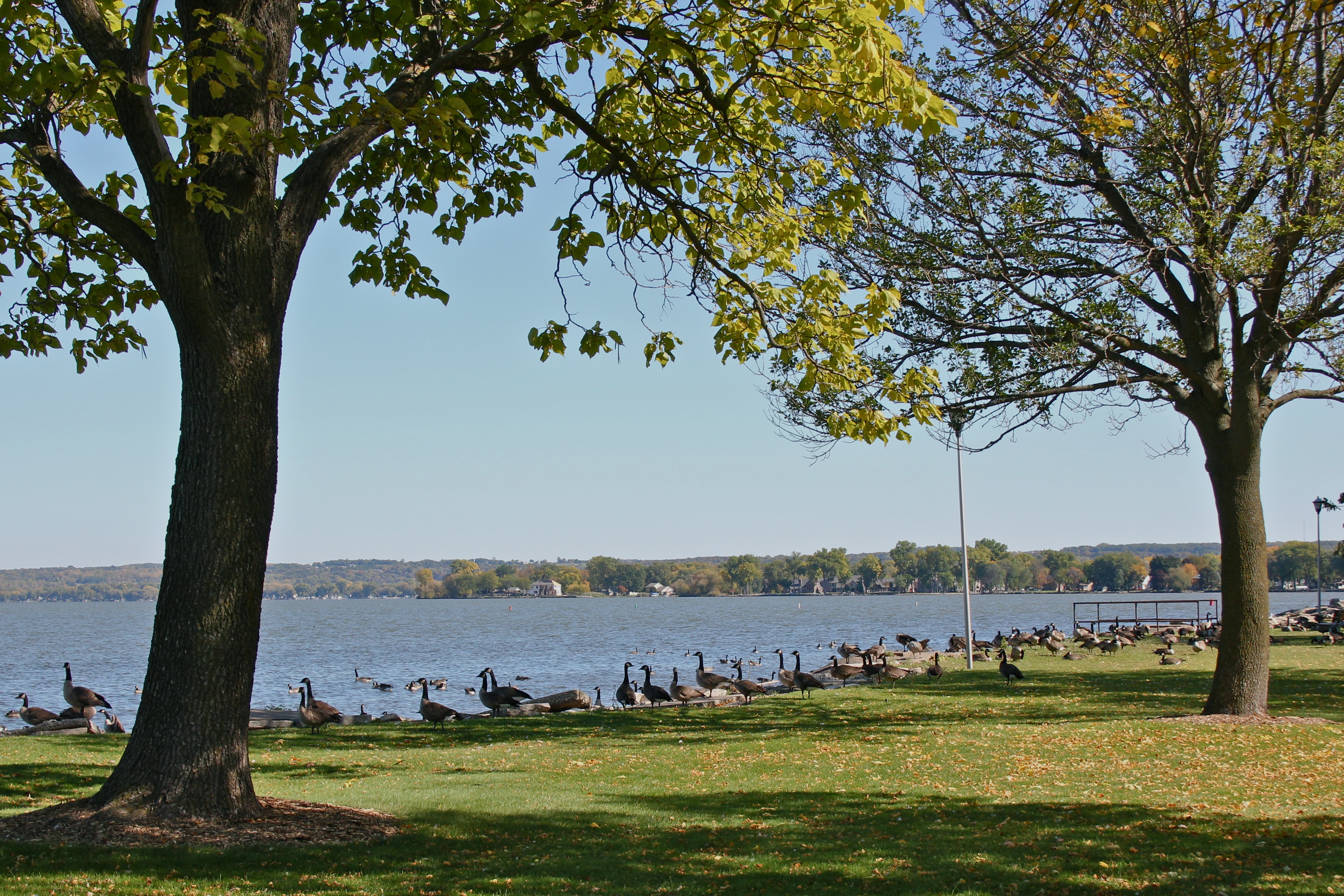
Lakeside Park on the south shore of Lake Winnebago

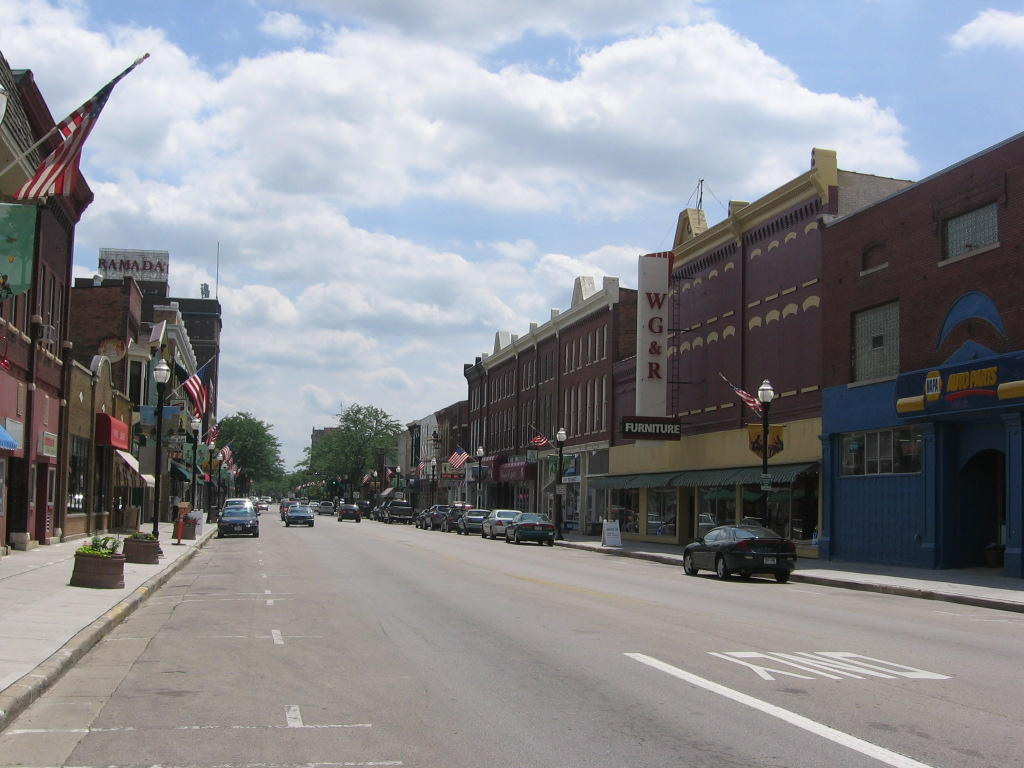
North Main Street Historic District in Fond du Lac

== Past senators ==
The district has previously been represented by:

Note: the boundaries of districts have changed repeatedly over history. Previous politicians of a specific numbered district have represented a completely different geographic area, due to redistricting.

Senator	Party	Notes	Session	Years	District Definition
District created by 1852 Wisc. Act 499.				1852	1852–1856 1856–1860 1861–1865 1866–1870; Fond du Lac County
Bertine Pinckney	Dem.	Redistricted from 4th district.	6th	1853	1852–1856 1856–1860 1861–1865 1866–1870; Fond du Lac County
Charles A. Eldredge	Dem.		7th	1854	1852–1856 1856–1860 1861–1865 1866–1870; Fond du Lac County
Charles A. Eldredge	Dem.		8th	1855	1852–1856 1856–1860 1861–1865 1866–1870; Fond du Lac County
Edward Pier	Rep.		9th	1856	1852–1856 1856–1860 1861–1865 1866–1870; Fond du Lac County
Edward Pier	Rep.		10th	1857	1852–1856 1856–1860 1861–1865 1866–1870; Fond du Lac County
Edward Pier	Rep.		11th	1858	1852–1856 1856–1860 1861–1865 1866–1870; Fond du Lac County
Edward Pier	Rep.		12th	1859	1852–1856 1856–1860 1861–1865 1866–1870; Fond du Lac County
Elihu L. Phillips	Rep.		13th	1860	1852–1856 1856–1860 1861–1865 1866–1870; Fond du Lac County
Elihu L. Phillips	Rep.		14th	1861	1852–1856 1856–1860 1861–1865 1866–1870; Fond du Lac County
George W. Mitchell	Dem.		15th	1862	1852–1856 1856–1860 1861–1865 1866–1870; Fond du Lac County
George W. Mitchell	Dem.		16th	1863	1852–1856 1856–1860 1861–1865 1866–1870; Fond du Lac County
George F. Wheeler	Natl. Union		17th	1864	1852–1856 1856–1860 1861–1865 1866–1870; Fond du Lac County
George F. Wheeler	Natl. Union		18th	1865	1852–1856 1856–1860 1861–1865 1866–1870; Fond du Lac County
George F. Wheeler	Natl. Union		19th	1866	1852–1856 1856–1860 1861–1865 1866–1870; Fond du Lac County
George F. Wheeler	Natl. Union		20th	1867	1852–1856 1856–1860 1861–1865 1866–1870; Fond du Lac County
Edward S. Bragg	Dem.		21st	1868	1852–1856 1856–1860 1861–1865 1866–1870; Fond du Lac County
Edward S. Bragg	Dem.		22nd	1869	1852–1856 1856–1860 1861–1865 1866–1870; Fond du Lac County
Hiram S. Town	Rep.		23rd	1870	1852–1856 1856–1860 1861–1865 1866–1870; Fond du Lac County
Hiram S. Town	Rep.		24th	1871	1852–1856 1856–1860 1861–1865 1866–1870; Fond du Lac County
Joseph Wagner	Dem.		25th	1872	Eastern Fond du Lac County: Town of Ashford; Town of Auburn; Town of Byron; Town of Calumet; Town of Eden; Town of Empire; Town of Forest; Town of Marshfield; Town of Osceola; Town of Taycheedah
Joseph Wagner	Dem.		26th	1873	Eastern Fond du Lac County: Town of Ashford; Town of Auburn; Town of Byron; Town of Calumet; Town of Eden; Town of Empire; Town of Forest; Town of Marshfield; Town of Osceola; Town of Taycheedah
Joseph Wagner	Dem.		27th	1874	Eastern Fond du Lac County: Town of Ashford; Town of Auburn; Town of Byron; Town of Calumet; Town of Eden; Town of Empire; Town of Forest; Town of Marshfield; Town of Osceola; Town of Taycheedah
Joseph Wagner	Dem.		28th	1875	Eastern Fond du Lac County: Town of Ashford; Town of Auburn; Town of Byron; Town of Calumet; Town of Eden; Town of Empire; Town of Forest; Town of Marshfield; Town of Osceola; Town of Taycheedah
Daniel Cavanagh	Dem.		29th	1876	Eastern Fond du Lac County: Town of Ashford; Town of Auburn; Town of Byron; Town of Calumet; Town of Eden; Town of Empire; Town of Forest; Town of Marshfield; Town of Osceola; Town of Taycheedah
Daniel Cavanagh	Dem.		30th	1877	1876–1881 1882–1887 1888–1891; Sheboygan County and Eastern Fond du Lac County: Town of Ashford; Town of Auburn; Town of Calumet; Town of Eden; Town of Forest; Town of Marshfield; Town of Osceola; Town of Taycheedah
Louis Wolf	Dem.		31st	1878	1876–1881 1882–1887 1888–1891; Sheboygan County and Eastern Fond du Lac County: Town of Ashford; Town of Auburn; Town of Calumet; Town of Eden; Town of Forest; Town of Marshfield; Town of Osceola; Town of Taycheedah
Louis Wolf	Dem.		32nd	1879	1876–1881 1882–1887 1888–1891; Sheboygan County and Eastern Fond du Lac County: Town of Ashford; Town of Auburn; Town of Calumet; Town of Eden; Town of Forest; Town of Marshfield; Town of Osceola; Town of Taycheedah
Patrick Henry Smith	Dem.		33rd	1880	1876–1881 1882–1887 1888–1891; Sheboygan County and Eastern Fond du Lac County: Town of Ashford; Town of Auburn; Town of Calumet; Town of Eden; Town of Forest; Town of Marshfield; Town of Osceola; Town of Taycheedah
Patrick Henry Smith	Dem.		34th	1881	1876–1881 1882–1887 1888–1891; Sheboygan County and Eastern Fond du Lac County: Town of Ashford; Town of Auburn; Town of Calumet; Town of Eden; Town of Forest; Town of Marshfield; Town of Osceola; Town of Taycheedah
Patrick Henry Smith	Dem.		35th	1882	1876–1881 1882–1887 1888–1891; Sheboygan County and Eastern Fond du Lac County: Town of Ashford; Town of Auburn; Town of Calumet; Town of Eden; Town of Forest; Town of Marshfield; Town of Osceola; Town of Taycheedah
Patrick Henry Smith	Dem.		36th	1883–1884	1876–1881 1882–1887 1888–1891; Sheboygan County and Eastern Fond du Lac County: Town of Ashford; Town of Auburn; Town of Calumet; Town of Eden; Town of Forest; Town of Marshfield; Town of Osceola; Town of Taycheedah
Ignatius Klotz	Dem.		37th	1885–1886	1876–1881 1882–1887 1888–1891; Sheboygan County and Eastern Fond du Lac County: Town of Ashford; Town of Auburn; Town of Calumet; Town of Eden; Town of Forest; Town of Marshfield; Town of Osceola; Town of Taycheedah
Ignatius Klotz	Dem.		38th	1887–1888	1876–1881 1882–1887 1888–1891; Sheboygan County and Eastern Fond du Lac County: Town of Ashford; Town of Auburn; Town of Calumet; Town of Eden; Town of Forest; Town of Marshfield; Town of Osceola; Town of Taycheedah
Major C. Mead	Dem.		39th	1889–1890	1876–1881 1882–1887 1888–1891; Sheboygan County and Eastern Fond du Lac County: Town of Ashford; Town of Auburn; Town of Calumet; Town of Eden; Town of Forest; Town of Marshfield; Town of Osceola; Town of Taycheedah
Major C. Mead	Dem.		40th	1891–1892	1876–1881 1882–1887 1888–1891; Sheboygan County and Eastern Fond du Lac County: Town of Ashford; Town of Auburn; Town of Calumet; Town of Eden; Town of Forest; Town of Marshfield; Town of Osceola; Town of Taycheedah
Dennis T. Phalen	Dem.		41st	1893–1894	Sheboygan County; 1890 population: 42,489
Dennis T. Phalen	Dem.		42nd	1895–1896	Sheboygan County; 1890 population: 42,489
Fred A. Dennett	Rep.		43rd	1897–1898	1896–1901 1902–1911 1912–1921 1922–1953 1954–1963 1964–1971; Ozaukee and Sheboygan counties 1895 population: 64,941; 1900 population: 66,708; 1910 population: 72,011
Fred A. Dennett	Rep.		44th	1899–1900	1896–1901 1902–1911 1912–1921 1922–1953 1954–1963 1964–1971; Ozaukee and Sheboygan counties 1895 population: 64,941; 1900 population: 66,708; 1910 population: 72,011
George W. Wolff	Rep.		45th	1901–1902	1896–1901 1902–1911 1912–1921 1922–1953 1954–1963 1964–1971; Ozaukee and Sheboygan counties 1895 population: 64,941; 1900 population: 66,708; 1910 population: 72,011
George W. Wolff	Rep.		46th	1903–1904	1896–1901 1902–1911 1912–1921 1922–1953 1954–1963 1964–1971; Ozaukee and Sheboygan counties 1895 population: 64,941; 1900 population: 66,708; 1910 population: 72,011
George W. Wolff	Rep.		47th	1905–1906	1896–1901 1902–1911 1912–1921 1922–1953 1954–1963 1964–1971; Ozaukee and Sheboygan counties 1895 population: 64,941; 1900 population: 66,708; 1910 population: 72,011
George W. Wolff	Rep.		48th	1907–1908	1896–1901 1902–1911 1912–1921 1922–1953 1954–1963 1964–1971; Ozaukee and Sheboygan counties 1895 population: 64,941; 1900 population: 66,708; 1910 population: 72,011
Henry Krumrey	Rep.		49th	1909–1910	1896–1901 1902–1911 1912–1921 1922–1953 1954–1963 1964–1971; Ozaukee and Sheboygan counties 1895 population: 64,941; 1900 population: 66,708; 1910 population: 72,011
Henry Krumrey	Rep.		50th	1911–1912	1896–1901 1902–1911 1912–1921 1922–1953 1954–1963 1964–1971; Ozaukee and Sheboygan counties 1895 population: 64,941; 1900 population: 66,708; 1910 population: 72,011
William J. Bichler	Dem.		51st	1913–1914	1896–1901 1902–1911 1912–1921 1922–1953 1954–1963 1964–1971; Ozaukee and Sheboygan counties 1895 population: 64,941; 1900 population: 66,708; 1910 population: 72,011
William J. Bichler	Dem.		52nd	1915–1916	1896–1901 1902–1911 1912–1921 1922–1953 1954–1963 1964–1971; Ozaukee and Sheboygan counties 1895 population: 64,941; 1900 population: 66,708; 1910 population: 72,011
Theodore Benfey	Rep.		53rd	1917–1918	1896–1901 1902–1911 1912–1921 1922–1953 1954–1963 1964–1971; Ozaukee and Sheboygan counties 1895 population: 64,941; 1900 population: 66,708; 1910 population: 72,011
Theodore Benfey	Rep.		54th	1919–1920	1896–1901 1902–1911 1912–1921 1922–1953 1954–1963 1964–1971; Ozaukee and Sheboygan counties 1895 population: 64,941; 1900 population: 66,708; 1910 population: 72,011
Theodore Benfey	Rep.		55th	1921–1922	1896–1901 1902–1911 1912–1921 1922–1953 1954–1963 1964–1971; Ozaukee and Sheboygan counties 1895 population: 64,941; 1900 population: 66,708; 1910 population: 72,011
Theodore Benfey	Rep.		56th	1923–1924	1896–1901 1902–1911 1912–1921 1922–1953 1954–1963 1964–1971; Ozaukee and Sheboygan counties 1895 population: 64,941; 1900 population: 66,708; 1910 population: 72,011
Herman E. Boldt	Rep.		57th	1925–1926	1896–1901 1902–1911 1912–1921 1922–1953 1954–1963 1964–1971; Ozaukee and Sheboygan counties 1895 population: 64,941; 1900 population: 66,708; 1910 population: 72,011
Herman E. Boldt	Rep.		58th	1927–1928	1896–1901 1902–1911 1912–1921 1922–1953 1954–1963 1964–1971; Ozaukee and Sheboygan counties 1895 population: 64,941; 1900 population: 66,708; 1910 population: 72,011
Herman E. Boldt	Rep.		59th	1929–1930	1896–1901 1902–1911 1912–1921 1922–1953 1954–1963 1964–1971; Ozaukee and Sheboygan counties 1895 population: 64,941; 1900 population: 66,708; 1910 population: 72,011
Herman E. Boldt	Rep.		60th	1931–1932	1896–1901 1902–1911 1912–1921 1922–1953 1954–1963 1964–1971; Ozaukee and Sheboygan counties 1895 population: 64,941; 1900 population: 66,708; 1910 population: 72,011
Harry W. Bolens	Dem.		61st	1933–1934	1896–1901 1902–1911 1912–1921 1922–1953 1954–1963 1964–1971; Ozaukee and Sheboygan counties 1895 population: 64,941; 1900 population: 66,708; 1910 population: 72,011
Harry W. Bolens	Dem.		62nd	1935–1936	1896–1901 1902–1911 1912–1921 1922–1953 1954–1963 1964–1971; Ozaukee and Sheboygan counties 1895 population: 64,941; 1900 population: 66,708; 1910 population: 72,011
Harry W. Bolens	Dem.		63rd	1937–1938	1896–1901 1902–1911 1912–1921 1922–1953 1954–1963 1964–1971; Ozaukee and Sheboygan counties 1895 population: 64,941; 1900 population: 66,708; 1910 population: 72,011
Harry W. Bolens	Dem.		64th	1939–1940	1896–1901 1902–1911 1912–1921 1922–1953 1954–1963 1964–1971; Ozaukee and Sheboygan counties 1895 population: 64,941; 1900 population: 66,708; 1910 population: 72,011
Gustave W. Buchen	Rep.		65th	1941–1942	1896–1901 1902–1911 1912–1921 1922–1953 1954–1963 1964–1971; Ozaukee and Sheboygan counties 1895 population: 64,941; 1900 population: 66,708; 1910 population: 72,011
Gustave W. Buchen	Rep.		66th	1943–1944	1896–1901 1902–1911 1912–1921 1922–1953 1954–1963 1964–1971; Ozaukee and Sheboygan counties 1895 population: 64,941; 1900 population: 66,708; 1910 population: 72,011
Gustave W. Buchen	Rep.		67th	1945–1946	1896–1901 1902–1911 1912–1921 1922–1953 1954–1963 1964–1971; Ozaukee and Sheboygan counties 1895 population: 64,941; 1900 population: 66,708; 1910 population: 72,011
Gustave W. Buchen	Rep.		68th	1947–1948	1896–1901 1902–1911 1912–1921 1922–1953 1954–1963 1964–1971; Ozaukee and Sheboygan counties 1895 population: 64,941; 1900 population: 66,708; 1910 population: 72,011
Gustave W. Buchen	Rep.		69th	1949–1950	1896–1901 1902–1911 1912–1921 1922–1953 1954–1963 1964–1971; Ozaukee and Sheboygan counties 1895 population: 64,941; 1900 population: 66,708; 1910 population: 72,011
Gustave W. Buchen	Rep.		70th	1951–1952	1896–1901 1902–1911 1912–1921 1922–1953 1954–1963 1964–1971; Ozaukee and Sheboygan counties 1895 population: 64,941; 1900 population: 66,708; 1910 population: 72,011
Louis H. Prange	Rep.	Died Aug. 1957.	71st	1953–1954	1896–1901 1902–1911 1912–1921 1922–1953 1954–1963 1964–1971; Ozaukee and Sheboygan counties 1895 population: 64,941; 1900 population: 66,708; 1910 population: 72,011
Louis H. Prange	Rep.	Died Aug. 1957.	72nd	1955–1956	1896–1901 1902–1911 1912–1921 1922–1953 1954–1963 1964–1971; Ozaukee and Sheboygan counties 1895 population: 64,941; 1900 population: 66,708; 1910 population: 72,011
Louis H. Prange	Rep.	Died Aug. 1957.	73rd	1957–1958	1896–1901 1902–1911 1912–1921 1922–1953 1954–1963 1964–1971; Ozaukee and Sheboygan counties 1895 population: 64,941; 1900 population: 66,708; 1910 population: 72,011
--Vacant--			73rd	1957–1958	1896–1901 1902–1911 1912–1921 1922–1953 1954–1963 1964–1971; Ozaukee and Sheboygan counties 1895 population: 64,941; 1900 population: 66,708; 1910 population: 72,011
Harold F. Huibregtse	Rep.	Won 1958 special election.	73rd	1957–1958	1896–1901 1902–1911 1912–1921 1922–1953 1954–1963 1964–1971; Ozaukee and Sheboygan counties 1895 population: 64,941; 1900 population: 66,708; 1910 population: 72,011
Harold F. Huibregtse	Rep.	Won 1958 special election.	74th	1959–1960	1896–1901 1902–1911 1912–1921 1922–1953 1954–1963 1964–1971; Ozaukee and Sheboygan counties 1895 population: 64,941; 1900 population: 66,708; 1910 population: 72,011
Ernest Keppler	Rep.	Resigned 1979 after election as Wisconsin circuit court judge.	75th	1961–1962	1896–1901 1902–1911 1912–1921 1922–1953 1954–1963 1964–1971; Ozaukee and Sheboygan counties 1895 population: 64,941; 1900 population: 66,708; 1910 population: 72,011
Ernest Keppler	Rep.	Resigned 1979 after election as Wisconsin circuit court judge.	76th	1963–1964	1896–1901 1902–1911 1912–1921 1922–1953 1954–1963 1964–1971; Ozaukee and Sheboygan counties 1895 population: 64,941; 1900 population: 66,708; 1910 population: 72,011
Ernest Keppler	Rep.	Resigned 1979 after election as Wisconsin circuit court judge.	77th	1965–1966	1896–1901 1902–1911 1912–1921 1922–1953 1954–1963 1964–1971; Ozaukee and Sheboygan counties 1895 population: 64,941; 1900 population: 66,708; 1910 population: 72,011
Ernest Keppler	Rep.	Resigned 1979 after election as Wisconsin circuit court judge.	78th	1967–1968	1896–1901 1902–1911 1912–1921 1922–1953 1954–1963 1964–1971; Ozaukee and Sheboygan counties 1895 population: 64,941; 1900 population: 66,708; 1910 population: 72,011
Ernest Keppler	Rep.	Resigned 1979 after election as Wisconsin circuit court judge.	79th	1969–1970	1896–1901 1902–1911 1912–1921 1922–1953 1954–1963 1964–1971; Ozaukee and Sheboygan counties 1895 population: 64,941; 1900 population: 66,708; 1910 population: 72,011
Ernest Keppler	Rep.	Resigned 1979 after election as Wisconsin circuit court judge.	80th	1971–1972	1896–1901 1902–1911 1912–1921 1922–1953 1954–1963 1964–1971; Ozaukee and Sheboygan counties 1895 population: 64,941; 1900 population: 66,708; 1910 population: 72,011
Ernest Keppler	Rep.	Resigned 1979 after election as Wisconsin circuit court judge.	81st	1973–1974	Northern Ozaukee County; Most of Sheboygan County
Ernest Keppler	Rep.	Resigned 1979 after election as Wisconsin circuit court judge.	82nd	1975–1976	Northern Ozaukee County; Most of Sheboygan County
Ernest Keppler	Rep.	Resigned 1979 after election as Wisconsin circuit court judge.	83rd	1977–1978	Northern Ozaukee County; Most of Sheboygan County
--Vacant--			84th	1979–1980	Northern Ozaukee County; Most of Sheboygan County
David W. Opitz	Rep.	Won 1979 special election.	84th	1979–1980	Northern Ozaukee County; Most of Sheboygan County
David W. Opitz	Rep.	Won 1979 special election.	85th	1981–1982	Northern Ozaukee County; Most of Sheboygan County
David W. Opitz	Rep.	Won 1979 special election.	86th	1983–1984	Ozaukee County and Southeast Sheboygan County; Eastern Washington County
Donald K. Stitt	Rep.	Resigned 1993.	87th	1985–1986	Most of Ozaukee County; Most of Washington County; Eastern Dodge County; Part of Fond du Lac County; Part of Sheboygan County
Donald K. Stitt	Rep.	Resigned 1993.	88th	1987–1988	Most of Ozaukee County; Most of Washington County; Eastern Dodge County; Part of Fond du Lac County; Part of Sheboygan County
Donald K. Stitt	Rep.	Resigned 1993.	89th	1989–1990	Most of Ozaukee County; Most of Washington County; Eastern Dodge County; Part of Fond du Lac County; Part of Sheboygan County
Donald K. Stitt	Rep.	Resigned 1993.	90th	1991–1992	Most of Ozaukee County; Most of Washington County; Eastern Dodge County; Part of Fond du Lac County; Part of Sheboygan County
Donald K. Stitt	Rep.	Resigned 1993.	91st	1993–1994	Most of Ozaukee County; Most of Washington County; Part of Dodge County; Part of Sheboygan County
Mary Panzer	Rep.	Won 1993 special election.	91st	1993–1994	Most of Ozaukee County; Most of Washington County; Part of Dodge County; Part of Sheboygan County
Mary Panzer	Rep.	Won 1993 special election.	92nd	1995–1996	Most of Ozaukee County; Most of Washington County; Part of Dodge County; Part of Sheboygan County
Mary Panzer	Rep.	Won 1993 special election.	93rd	1997–1998	Most of Ozaukee County; Most of Washington County; Part of Dodge County; Part of Sheboygan County
Mary Panzer	Rep.	Won 1993 special election.	94th	1999–2000	Most of Ozaukee County; Most of Washington County; Part of Dodge County; Part of Sheboygan County
Mary Panzer	Rep.	Won 1993 special election.	95th	2001–2002	Most of Ozaukee County; Most of Washington County; Part of Dodge County; Part of Sheboygan County
Mary Panzer	Rep.	Won 1993 special election.	96th	2003–2004	Most of Ozaukee County; Most of Washington County; Southern Sheboygan County; Southeast Fond du Lac County; Part of Dodge County
Glenn Grothman	Rep.	Resigned 2015 after election to U.S. House.	97th	2005–2006	Most of Ozaukee County; Most of Washington County; Southern Sheboygan County; Southeast Fond du Lac County; Part of Dodge County
Glenn Grothman	Rep.	Resigned 2015 after election to U.S. House.	98th	2007–2008	Most of Ozaukee County; Most of Washington County; Southern Sheboygan County; Southeast Fond du Lac County; Part of Dodge County
Glenn Grothman	Rep.	Resigned 2015 after election to U.S. House.	99th	2009–2010	Most of Ozaukee County; Most of Washington County; Southern Sheboygan County; Southeast Fond du Lac County; Part of Dodge County
Glenn Grothman	Rep.	Resigned 2015 after election to U.S. House.	100th	2011–2012	Most of Ozaukee County; Most of Washington County; Southern Sheboygan County; Southeast Fond du Lac County; Part of Dodge County
Glenn Grothman	Rep.	Resigned 2015 after election to U.S. House.	101st	2013–2014	Most of Washington County; Northern Ozaukee County; Western Sheboygan County; Eastern Fond du Lac County; Part of Calumet County
—Vacant--			102nd	2015–2016	Most of Washington County; Northern Ozaukee County; Western Sheboygan County; Eastern Fond du Lac County; Part of Calumet County
Duey Stroebel	Rep.		102nd	2015–2016	Most of Washington County; Northern Ozaukee County; Western Sheboygan County; Eastern Fond du Lac County; Part of Calumet County
Duey Stroebel	Rep.		103rd	2017–2018	Most of Washington County; Northern Ozaukee County; Western Sheboygan County; Eastern Fond du Lac County; Part of Calumet County
Duey Stroebel	Rep.		104th	2019–2020	Most of Washington County; Northern Ozaukee County; Western Sheboygan County; Eastern Fond du Lac County; Part of Calumet County
Duey Stroebel	Rep.		105th	2021–2022	Most of Washington County; Northern Ozaukee County; Western Sheboygan County; Eastern Fond du Lac County; Part of Calumet County
Duey Stroebel	Rep.		106th	2023–2024	Most of Washington County, northern Ozaukee County western Sheboygan County eastern Fond du Lac County southern Calumet County
Dan Feyen	Rep.	Elected 2024.	107th	2025–2026	Most of Washington County eastern Fond du Lac County northern Ozaukee County parts of southern Sheboygan County part of northeast Dodge County
