= Edward S. Bragg =

19th century American politician (1827-1912)

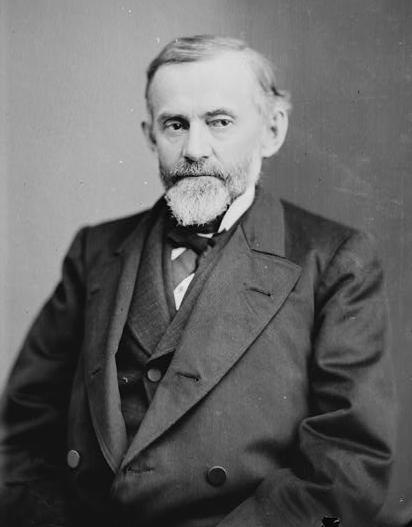
- Representative Edward S. Bragg

United States Minister to Mexico
- In office March 5, 1888 – May 27, 1889
- President: Grover Cleveland
- Preceded by: Thomas C. Manning
- Succeeded by: Thomas Ryan

Chair of the House Military Affairs Committee
- In office March 4, 1885 – March 3, 1887
- Preceded by: William Rosecrans
- Succeeded by: Richard W. Townshend

Member of the U.S. House of Representatives from Wisconsin
- In office March 4, 1885 – March 3, 1887
- Preceded by: Daniel H. Sumner
- Succeeded by: Richard W. Guenther
- Constituency: 2nd district
- In office March 4, 1877 – March 3, 1883
- Preceded by: Samuel D. Burchard
- Succeeded by: Joseph Rankin
- Constituency: 5th district

Member of the Wisconsin Senate from the 20th district
- In office January 1, 1868 – January 1, 1870
- Preceded by: George F. Wheeler
- Succeeded by: Hiram S. Town

District Attorney of Fond du Lac County
- In office January 1, 1854 – January 1, 1856
- Preceded by: William H. Ebbets
- Succeeded by: Isaac S. Tallmadge

Personal details
- Born: Edward Stuyvesant Bragg; February 20, 1827 Unadilla, New York, U.S.
- Died: June 20, 1912 (aged 85) Fond du Lac, Wisconsin, U.S.
- Resting place: Rienzi Cemetery, Fond du Lac
- Party: Republican (after 1896); National Dem. (1896); Democratic (before 1896)
- Height: 5 ft 7 in (170 cm)
- Spouse: Cornelia Colman (m. 1854)
- Children: 6
- Parents: Joel Bragg (father); Margaretha (Kohl) Bragg (mother)
- Relatives: Braxton Bragg (cousin); Frederick Benteen (cousin)
- Nickname: "The Little Colonel"

Military service
- Allegiance: United States
- Branch/service: United States Volunteers; Union Army
- Years of service: 1861–1865
- Rank: Brig. General
- Commands: 6th Reg. Wis. Vol. Infantry (1862–1864); Iron Brigade (1864–1865)
- Battles/wars: American Civil War; Northern Virginia campaign; First Battle of Rappahannock Station; Second Battle of Bull Run; Maryland campaign; Battle of South Mountain; Battle of Antietam (WIA); Fredericksburg campaign; Battle of Fredericksburg; Mud March; Chancellorsville campaign; Battle of Chancellorsville (WIA); Bristoe campaign; Battle of Mine Run; Overland Campaign; Battle of the Wilderness; Battle of Spotsylvania Court House; Battle of North Anna; Battle of Cold Harbor; Siege of Petersburg; Second Battle of Petersburg; Battle of the Crater; Battle of Globe Tavern; Battle of Boydton Plank Road; Battle of Hatcher's Run

Edward Stuyvesant Bragg (February 20, 1827 – June 20, 1912) was an American lawyer, diplomat, and Democratic politician from Fond du Lac, Wisconsin. He served four terms in the U.S. House of Representatives, representing eastern Wisconsin from 1877 to 1883, and from 1885 to 1887, and was one of the leading Democrats in Wisconsin in the latter half of the 19th century. He also had a distinguished military career as a Union Army officer in the American Civil War, leading the 6th Wisconsin Infantry Regiment and later the famous Iron Brigade of the Army of the Potomac, rising to the rank of brigadier general by the end of the war.

Bragg found a new calling as a diplomat after he was appointed United States minister to Mexico by president Grover Cleveland in 1888. In the 1890s, Bragg fell out with the Democratic Party over the populist policies of William Jennings Bryan, and later served as consul-general to the Republic of Cuba and British Hong Kong under President Theodore Roosevelt.

== Early life and career ==
Bragg was born in Unadilla, New York, the son of Margarette (Kohl) and Joel B. Bragg. Bragg attended district schools as a child. He then attended the local academy and Geneva College, today Hobart College, in Geneva, New York, where he was one of the charter members of the Kappa Alpha Society. He left college before graduating, in 1847, and studied law in the offices of Judge Charles C. Noble. He was admitted to the New York State Bar Association in 1848, and worked as a junior partner with Judge Noble until 1850.

In 1850, he traveled west on a prospecting tour in Wisconsin, intending to settle near Green Bay. On the road between Chicago and Green Bay, he recognized the name of a former schoolmate on a sign at Fond du Lac, Wisconsin, and decided to settle there.

Bragg quickly rose in prominence in Fond du Lac, associating himself with the Democratic Party. He was elected district attorney of Fond du Lac in 1853 and was a delegate to the 1860 Democratic National Convention in Charleston, South Carolina, which nominated Stephen A. Douglas and Herschel V. Johnson for President and Vice President of the United States.

== Civil War service ==
When word arrived of the attack on Fort Sumter, Bragg was engaged in a case at Oshkosh, Wisconsin, where he was acting as defense counsel for a woman who had been accused of murder. He requested a recess and immediately returned to Fond du Lac. That night he addressed an assembly in the city and an entire company of "three-month" volunteers was raised. As Bragg went about arranging his personal affairs, the call came for another round of volunteers to enlist for three years service. Bragg recruited another company and was chosen as their captain. The company was referred to as "Bragg's Rifles" and would become Company E of the 6th Wisconsin Volunteer Infantry Regiment.

The 6th Wisconsin was organized at Camp Randall in Madison, Wisconsin, and mustered into service July 16, 1861, under Colonel Lysander Cutler. They were ordered to proceed to Washington, D.C., for service in the eastern theater of the war. Once at Washington, they were organized into the Brigade of General Rufus King. They were soon joined by the 2nd Wisconsin, 7th Wisconsin, and 19th Indiana regiments in what would become known as the Iron Brigade of the Army of the Potomac. From this point to the end of the war, Bragg participated in nearly every battle of the Iron Brigade.

=== Washington (Fall 1861 – Spring 1862) ===
The 6th Wisconsin spent the Fall of 1861 and Spring of 1862 on picket duty near Washington, building fortifications and drilling in preparation for combat. During this time, Bragg was promoted to major, on September 17, 1861, and then to lieutenant colonel, on June 21, 1862, after Lt. Colonel Benjamin Sweet was commissioned colonel of the new 21st Wisconsin Volunteer Infantry Regiment.

=== Northern Virginia (Summer 1862) ===
In April 1862, the Iron Brigade marched south and camped at Falmouth, Virginia, on the Rappahannock River, across from Fredericksburg, Virginia, where they remained through most of the Peninsula campaign. In June, they were briefly put on alert to prepare to reinforce General George B. McClellan, but ultimately did not participate.

In July, after General John Pope replaced McClellan in overall command of the Union Army, the Iron Brigade was assigned to participate in raids against Confederate infrastructure and logistics south of the Rappahannock. The most notable is the raid on Frederick's Hall, in the first week of August, intended to cut the Virginia Central Railroad. Part of the 6th Wisconsin, including Lt. Colonel Bragg, was detached from the brigade and sent on a rapid march to the North Anna River, where they discovered a large Confederate force was present on their flank. (Note: Dawes, p. 54; Lieutenant Colonels Kilpatrick and Bragg, argued strongly in favor of going on.)

A council of the officers was called to discuss whether they should abandon their raid due to the danger of being cut off and captured. Bragg, along with Major Rufus Dawes and Lt. Colonel Hugh Judson Kilpatrick, were adamant that the raid should proceed. The mission was ultimately successful as two miles of Virginia Central Railroad track were destroyed and the Union raiders returned safely to Falmouth. (Note: Dawes, p. 55; We tore up about two miles of railroad track, so says Colonel Cutler.)

=== Second Bull Run (August 1862) ===
The Iron Brigade arrived at Cedar Mountain, Virginia, two days after the battle there. They participated in burying the dead and engaged in skirmishing, directed by Colonel Bragg, associated with the First Battle of Rappahannock Station along the new defensive line at the Rappahannock River. (Note: Dawes, p. 57; Bragg was in command of these companies, I was second.)

After Stonewall Jackson successfully maneuvered around the flank of the Union army, the order was given to fall back to Centreville, Virginia, in an attempt to surround Jackson's Corps. On the evening of August 28, while marching northeast with three other brigades on the Warrenton Turnpike, the Iron Brigade encountered Jackson's Corps near Gainesville, Virginia. General Irvin McDowell, who commanded their Division, was convinced that the Confederates represented an inconsequential force, and ordered the brigades to proceed on their march toward Centreville. (Note: Dawes, p. 62; "Tell Colonel Bragg to take command, I am shot." —Colonel Lysander Cutler)

When the Confederates opened up cannon fire, General John Gibbon ordered the Iron Brigade to engage the enemy and attempt to capture the artillery. A severe battle ensued as the Iron Brigade faced a combined assault from five brigades of Stonewall Jackson's Corps. During the battle, Colonel Cutler was severely wounded. Lt. Colonel Bragg took command of the 6th Wisconsin and remained in command of the regiment for most of the next two years. Bragg and the 6th Wisconsin held the right end of the line against the brigades of Isaac R. Trimble and Alexander Lawton.

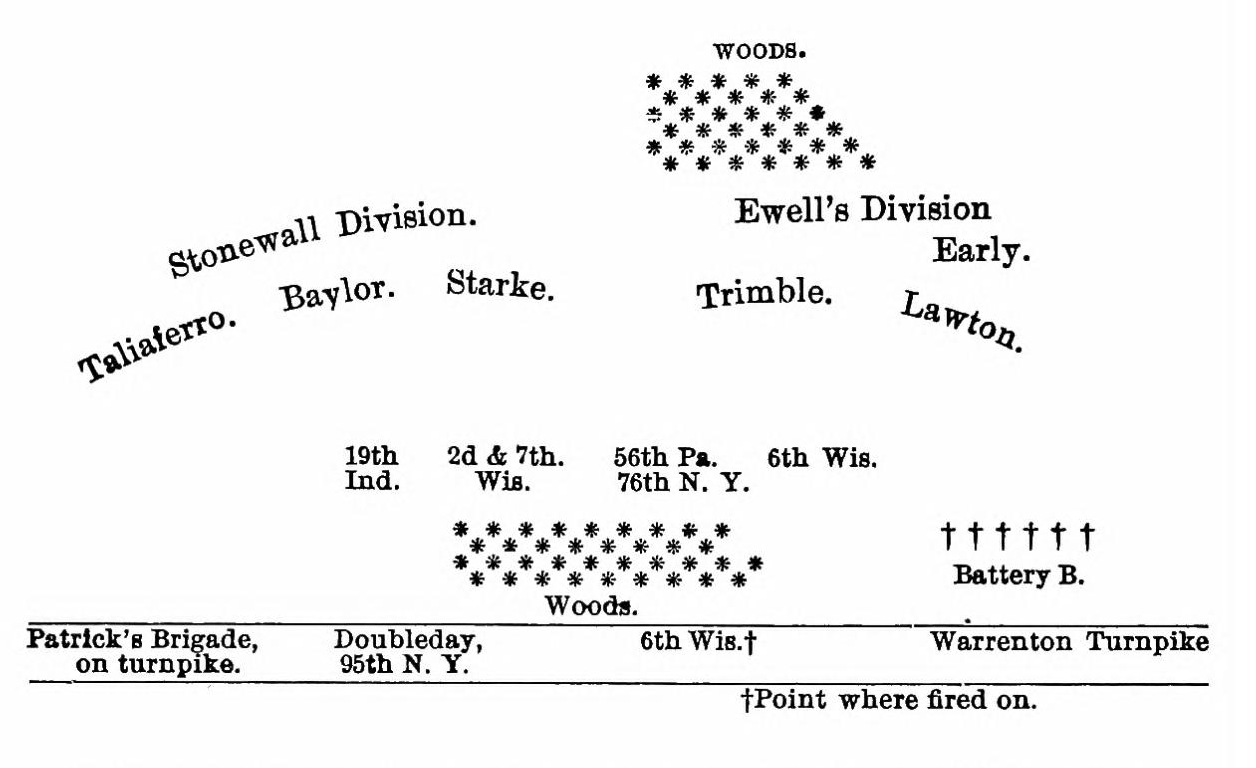
A sketch by Major Rufus Dawes of the location of forces at the Battle of Gainesville

The fighting at Gainesville is often referred to in historical documents as the "Battle of Gainesville" and represented the first day of fighting in the Second Battle of Bull Run. Despite being outnumbered by more than 3-to-1, the brigade held their ground and the fighting ended indecisively around midnight. This is where the nickname "Iron Brigade" was first applied to their unit. (Note: Quiner, p. 447; Here the brigade acquired its designation of the "Iron Brigade of the West.")

Bragg and the Iron Brigade were resting and remained in reserve during the second day of battle, but rejoined the fighting on the third day, August 30, 1862, in support of Fitz John Porter's V Corps and their ill-fated frontal assault on Jackson's position. As the attack faltered and the massive Confederate flanking attack began to materialize, Bragg held his regiment in line and deployed skirmishers to slow down the enemy attack. As the Union army fell back, Bragg was ordered to organize the 6th Wisconsin to act as rearguard. (Note: Dawes, p. 72; General Gibbon directed Colonel Bragg to form a line of skirmishers to cover the retreat of the regiment...) The 6th Wisconsin was the last to withdraw, marching on an orderly retreat for nearly a mile in full view of both opposing armies. (Note: Dawes, p. 73; General Rufus King in describing the scene says: "The sixth Wisconsin, the very last to retire, marched slowly and steadily to the rear, with column formed and colors flying...")

As the Union army retreated from the field on the night of August 30, General Philip Kearny ordered the Iron Brigade to act as rearguard for the Army. Bragg and Lt. Colonel Lucius Fairchild—who commanded the consolidated 2nd and 7th Wisconsin—would manage the action, setting pickets and false campfires to deceive the enemy.

=== Maryland and Antietam (September 1862) ===
After the failure of Pope's campaign, General McClellan was put back in command of the Union army. General Robert E. Lee seized the initiative and invaded Maryland. The Iron Brigade, now designated the 4th Brigade, 1st Division, in Joseph Hooker's I Corps, joined the Union pursuit of Lee into Maryland and encountered his army at South Mountain, south of Hagerstown, Maryland.

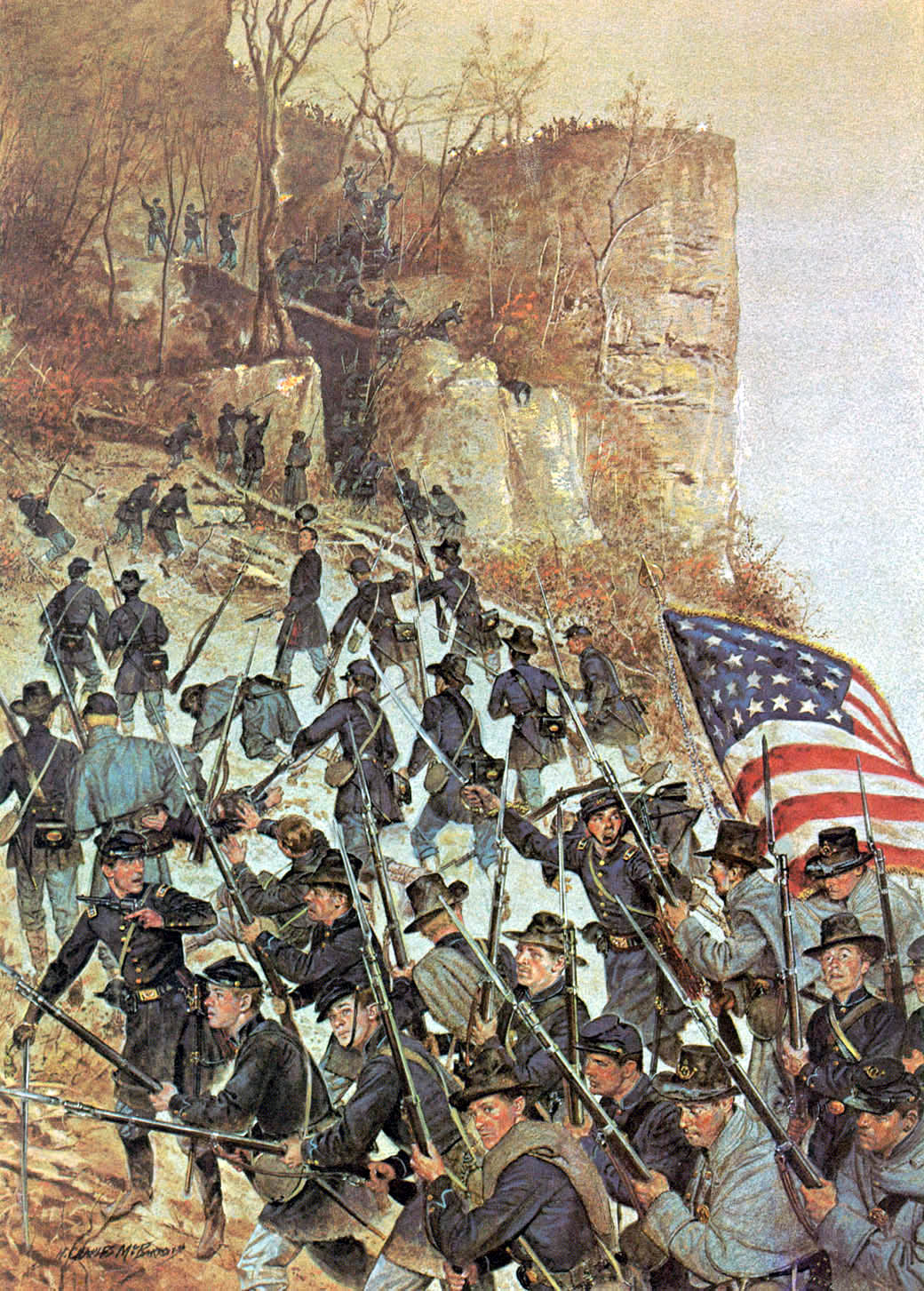
6th Wisconsin attacking at Turner's Gap, 1862.

At the Battle of South Mountain, on September 14, 1862, the Iron Brigade received special instructions to proceed up the National Road and engage Alfred H. Colquitt's brigade at Turner's Gap. Colonel Bragg commanded the 6th Wisconsin protecting the right flank of the attack, (Note: Quiner, p. 451; In order to protect the right flank, Lieutenant Colonel Bragg entered the woods on the right...) maneuvering his regiment in good order over difficult terrain, then up the incline of the field to obtain a favorable field of fire over the enemy position. From his vantage, General McClellan could see the fighting and later wrote to Wisconsin Governor Edward Salomon, "I beg to add my great admiration of the conduct of the three Wisconsin regiments in General Gibbon's brigade. I have seen them under fire acting in a manner that reflects the greatest possible credit and honor upon themselves and their state. They are equal to the best troops in any army in the world."

Lee evacuated South Mountain that evening, but McClellan caught up to him again at Antietam Creek, near Sharpsburg, Maryland, on September 16, 1862. That night, the Iron Brigade, along with the rest of I Corps, crossed the Antietam Creek and took position on the far right of the Union line.

At dawn, the Battle of Antietam began with I Corps advancing under artillery fire. Bragg led the 6th Wisconsin at the far right end of the Union advance, where they came under attack from the woods on their right flank. Bragg, despite having been shot in the initial barrage, ordered the men to reshape and return fire into the woods. (Note: Dawes, p. 80; Colonel Bragg was shot in the first fire from the woods and his nerve, in standing up under the shock until he had effected the maneuver so necessary for the safety of his men, was wonderful.) Bragg collapsed and was carried to the rear. He was able to return to the regiment around noon, but was not yet fit to return to duty.

In the aftermath of the battle, one of the sergeants mistakenly wrote to Bragg's wife informing her that he had been killed. (Note: Dawes, p. 99; One of our sergeants made the blunder of sending to Mrs. Bragg a message that her husband had been killed...) The story spread in Wisconsin and resulted in his obituary appearing in several papers.

Before Antietam, Bragg received solicitations from Wisconsin to run for Congress as a War Democrat on the National Union Party ticket. Bragg had replied, "I shall not decline a nomination on the platform, the Government must be sustained, but my services can not be taken from the field. I command the regiment, and can not leave in times like these." Nevertheless, after the battle, he received word that he had been nominated by the National Union Party district convention. He ultimately lost the election to anti-war Democrat Charles A. Eldredge. (Note: Dawes, pp. 105–106; I am afraid that Colonel Bragg was defeated for congress. It is manifest that the cowardly sneaks who stay at home intend to sell out the country.)

=== Fredericksburg and Chancellorsville (Winter 1862 – Spring 1863) ===
In the Winter of 1862–63, there were two more Union offensives attempted against Fredericksburg, Virginia. Bragg led the regiment through the Battle of Fredericksburg and the aborted Mud March, but they were not engaged in serious fighting in either campaign. The Iron Brigade spent most of the rest of the winter camped at Belle Plains, Virginia, where they were reorganized and resupplied. During this time, Bragg received his official promotion to colonel, effective March 10, 1863, and was one of several officers invited to meet with President Abraham Lincoln.

The campaigning resumed in April 1863 under General Joseph Hooker, now in overall command of the Army of the Potomac. In the Battle of Chancellorsville, the Iron Brigade was charged with securing the creation of a pontoon bridge at Fitz Hughes Crossing on the Rappahannock, southeast of Fredericksburg. After the bridge engineers came under attack from the far side of the river, Colonel Bragg was tasked with forcing a crossing and securing the far bank of the river. (Note: Dawes, p. 136; Colonel Bragg briefly and plainly stated to the regiment what was expected of them and the plan for the execution of the movement.) Within an hour, Bragg had secured the beachhead and taken nearly 200 of Confederate prisoners.

Bragg and the 6th Wisconsin received special compliments from their division commander, General James S. Wadsworth, for the daring raid. After crossing, they were joined by VI Corps and the rest of I Corps, forming the left wing of Hooker's attack. However, after remaining in position for two days under enemy shelling, on May 2, I Corps and the Iron Brigade were recalled to cross back to the north side of the river and move west to reinforce Hooker at Chancellorsville. Ultimately, Hooker was forced to withdraw and the Iron Brigade and its Division again acted as rearguard for the Union retreat.

Colonel Bragg became seriously ill after Chancellorsville, possibly due to the poor weather conditions during the battle, combined with a wound he received from being kicked by Major John Hauser's horse. (Note: Dawes, p. 146; Colonel Bragg is very sick. The Major's ugly little horse kicked him a few days ago on the foot, which is also now a serious affair. He is trying to stay here in his tent, but he will probably be obliged to go to the hospital.) He remained in his tent attempting to recuperate, but, in early June, was sent to a hospital in Washington, D.C. (Note: Dawes, p. 149; Colonel Bragg has gone to Washington. His foot is very sore and bad.) While sick, Bragg missed the entire Gettysburg campaign, leaving the regiment under the command of Lt. Colonel Rufus Dawes, who performed heroic duty leading the regiment on the first day of the Battle of Gettysburg. (Note: Quiner, p. 461; ...Lieutenant Colonel Dawes, who commanded the Sixth Regiment, Colonel Bragg being absent under medical treatment.) Colonel Bragg briefly attempted to return to the regiment in the days after the Battle of Gettysburg but was still too ill to participate, and had to return again to medical care. (Note: Dawes, p. 189; Colonel Bragg has gone home sick.)

=== Bristoe, Mine Run, and Reorganization (Fall 1863 – Spring 1864) ===
Colonel Bragg returned to the 6th Wisconsin about August 28, 1863, finding them camped near Rappahannock Station. (Note: Dawes, p. 201; Colonel Bragg arrived in camp yesterday.) In the Bristoe campaign and the Battle of Mine Run, the Iron Brigade engaged in a series of rapid maneuvers, but did not engage in serious fighting.

In January 1864, the 6th Wisconsin officially achieved Veteran status and those who re-enlisted were given a furlough to return to Wisconsin. (Note: Dawes, p. 236; The re-enlisted regiment took freight cars for Alexandria, on their way to Wisconsin.) Bragg and the re-enlisted veterans traveled by train and were celebrated at a ceremony in Milwaukee, hosted by former Governor Edward Salomon, Milwaukee Mayor Edward O'Neill, and Bragg's former 2nd Wisconsin Regiment counterpart, General Lucius Fairchild—who had just been elected Wisconsin's Secretary of State.

=== Overland Campaign (Summer 1864) ===
In March 1864, General Ulysses S. Grant was appointed the commander of the Union Army in the Virginia theatre, replacing General George Meade, who had been in command since the Gettysburg Campaign. That same month, the Iron Brigade veterans returned to camp and engaged in drilling and reorganization under the new commander. For the next phase of the war, they would be the 1st Brigade, 4th Division, in Gouverneur K. Warren's V Corps.

On May 3, 1864, they returned to campaign, marching from their camp at Culpeper Court House. They arrived at the Wilderness Tavern south of the Rapidan River at dusk on May 4. On the morning of May 5, the Iron Brigade, along with their division, marched southwest and encountered the enemy in the woods at the start of what became the Battle of the Wilderness. The fighting in the woods was confusing and, after engaging with the enemy, Colonel Bragg ran out on his own to attempt to identify the location of other nearby Union regiments, nearly falling into the hands of the enemy. (Note: Dawes, p. 260; Colonel Bragg directed me to hasten forward with our regiment as fast as practicable through the brush, while he ran ahead to keep in sight of the colors of the seventh Indiana.) (Note: Dawes, p. 261; Colonel Bragg did not find the seventh Indiana, but he almost ran into the midst of the rebel army.)

That afternoon, their division received new orders to detach and proceed to the south to reinforce Winfield Scott Hancock's II Corps and John Sedgwick's VI Corps. Near dawn on May 6, the fighting resumed as Sedgwick launched his attack. The Iron Brigade attacked the left flank of the Confederate Third Corps under A. P. Hill. Though initially successful, the offensive stalled when elements of the Confederate First Corps under James Longstreet arrived and counterattacked. The Union forces fell back under the Confederate counterattack but stabilized along the Brock Road, between Wilderness Tavern and Todds Tavern, Virginia.

After the fighting on May 6, Colonel Bragg was placed in command of the all-Pennsylvanian 3rd Brigade of their Division—sometimes referred to as the "Pennsylvania Bucktail Brigade"—by General Lysander Cutler. Cutler, who had been Bragg's original commanding officer in the 6th Wisconsin, had become Division commander with the death of General James S. Wadsworth in the fighting earlier that day. Bragg replaced Colonel Roy Stone, who was reportedly drunk during the battle on both May 5 and May 6. On both days, his brigade had performed poorly, marching and firing in a disorganized manner, scattering in the face of Confederate skirmishers, and accidentally shooting at members of their own unit.

Stone was relieved of command after his horse fell on top of him as his lines broke again during the May 6 attack. Colonel Bragg led the brigade for most of the remainder of the Overland Campaign. His leadership stabilized the brigade and they performed admirably at the battles of Spotsylvania Court House, North Anna, Totopotomoy Creek, and Cold Harbor, where he turned over command of the brigade to Gettysburg hero Joshua Chamberlain. (Note: United States War Record Office, Series 1, v. 36:1, p. 611; I found Stone's brigade almost entirely without officers, Colonel Stone having left, sick; some had been captured and several killed and wounded. I placed it under the command of Col. E. S. Bragg, Sixth Wisconsin Volunteers, who retained command until the brigade was detached from the division June 5, doing good service.)

On the night of May 7, V Corps was ordered to proceed southeast toward Spotsylvania Court House, as Grant attempted to maneuver his army in between Lee and the Confederate capitol, Richmond. Arriving at Laurel Hill, northwest of Spotsylvania Court House, on the morning of May 8, they found a Confederate force had already reached the site and occupied strong defensive positions. Bragg's brigade participated in four Union assaults against the Confederate fortifications between May 8 and May 12. On the afternoon of May 12, they marched to their left and engaged in fighting at the "Bloody Angle".

Colonel Bragg was, once again, incorrectly reported killed in action after the fighting at Spotsylvania Court House. A letter from Colonel Thomas Allen announced his death—along with the deaths of Lt. Colonel Rufus Dawes and Captain John Azor Kellogg—and was widely reprinted in several Wisconsin newspapers. (Note: Dawes, p. 272; we have letters from Washington informing us that Colonel Bragg, Lieutenant Colonel Dawes, and Captain Kellogg of the sixth regiment are killed...) All three officers were actually alive and relatively unharmed—although Kellogg had been taken prisoner. (Note: Dawes, p. 285; We have heard from Captain Kellogg as alive and a prisoner.)

After days of skirmishing and shelling at the fortifications around Spotsylvania Court House, V Corps was again ordered to move to the south, continuing the maneuver toward Richmond. After stopping at Guinea's Station and the Po River, they crossed the North Anna River near dusk on May 23, 1864. That evening, before they were able to fully establish their battle lines, they were attacked by Confederates of A. P. Hill's Third Corps in the first action of the Battle of North Anna. After initially giving ground, the division rallied and drove the Confederates from the field. After more days of entrenched stalemate, on the evening of May 26, Grant again ordered the Union divisions to stealthily evacuate their lines and proceed south around the Confederate right flank. They crossed the Pamunkey River on May 28 and set defensive lines behind the cavalry Battle of Haw's Shop. They moved again on May 29 and May 30, encountering divisions of the Confederate 1st Corps at the Battle of Totopotomoy Creek and repelled them.

Over the next two weeks, they were engaged in the trench warfare of the Battle of Cold Harbor. On June 6, in the midst of this battle, Bragg's Pennsylvanian brigade was detached from the division and Bragg was placed in command of the Iron Brigade. (Note: United States War Record Office, Series 1, v. 36:3, pp. 650–651; I would like to have Colonel Bragg command the brigade of General Cutler's division at present commanded by Colonel Robinson. —G. K. Warren) Colonel Bragg's account of the actions of the Pennsylvanian brigade during the Overland campaign can be found in the Official War Records, Series 1, Volume 36, Part 1, Item 141.

=== Siege of Petersburg (Summer 1864 – Spring 1865) ===
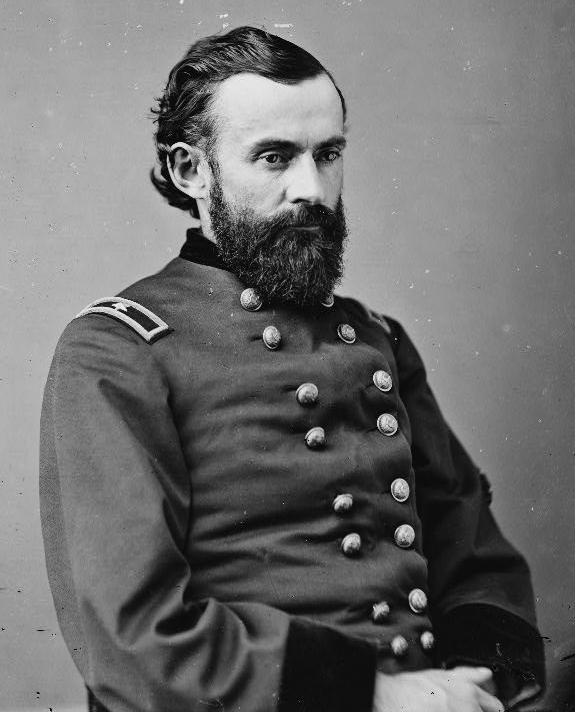
Bragg after promotion to Brigadier General

On June 12, they made another sudden evacuation of their position and crossed the James River, engaging the Siege of Petersburg, and entrenching southeast of the city. On June 18, they participated in the futile charge against the Petersburg defenses in the Second Battle of Petersburg. In the battle, the Iron Brigade was part of a general assault on the Confederate line, charging half a mile over open field toward the enemy. They were ordered to halt under enemy fire and waited there for Union regiments on their left, which had become panicked and disorganized.

After nearly two hours under fire, they retreated to their trenches. In his report of the battle, their division commander, General Lysander Cutler, said, "In this affair I lost in killed and wounded about one third of the men I had with me, and among them many valuable officers." He continued to say that they never reached within seventy five yards of the enemy lines.

For the next several weeks, they remained in position besieging Petersburg. They remained on the trench line—where they could be subject to sniper fire and artillery—until June 26, when they were relieved temporarily. During this time, Colonel Bragg received word of his official promotion to brigadier general, effective June 25, 1864. (Note: United States War Record Office, Series 1, v. 36:3, pp. 709–710; I have the honor herewith to transmit certain communications recommending ... Col. E. S. Bragg, Sixth Wisconsin Volunteers, ... for the appointment of brigadier-generals. —Geo. G. Meade) They rotated back to the trenches a few weeks later.

They remained engaged in the siege for the rest of the year and into early 1865. On July 30, a Union sapper mine detonated explosives underneath the Confederate trench, resulting in a day of fighting in what's called the Battle of the Crater. On August 18, 1864, they were part of the successful Union raid, known as the Battle of Globe Tavern, to cut the Weldon Railroad and reduce the supply lines for the Petersburg defenders. In October, there was another attempt, known as the Battle of Boydton Plank Road, to sever another Confederate supply line, but the attack was withdrawn.

General Bragg's final battle of the war was the Battle of Hatcher's Run, occurring February 6, 1865, near the site of the Battle of Boydton Plank Road. The Iron Brigade took heavy casualties, and, following the battle, had to be significantly reorganized. General Bragg was summoned to Washington with four regiments and then sent to Baltimore to supervise transportation of conscripts. He remained in Baltimore until the end of the war. He mustered out October 9, 1865.

== Postbellum career ==
Following the war, Bragg returned to his legal practice in Fond du Lac.

=== Johnson appointments controversy ===
In 1866, General Bragg was appointed postmaster of Fond du Lac by President Andrew Johnson. This occurred as tensions were beginning to rise between President Johnson and the Radical Republican Congress. In February 1867, the Senate voted to rescind Bragg's appointment, along with several other Johnson appointments. Johnson subsequently nominated Bragg to be Assessor of Internal Revenue for the 4th district of Wisconsin, which the United States Senate also defeated.

=== Democratic minority ===
Later in 1867, General Bragg won election to the Wisconsin State Senate from the 20th senatorial district, serving in the 21st and 22nd Wisconsin Legislatures (1868 & 1869). He did not run for re-election in 1869, but remained extremely active in Democratic politics, campaigning for the Democratic tickets and running for office several times. He was mostly unsuccessful for the next several years, as Republican politics remained dominant in Wisconsin.

In 1868, Bragg was a member of the executive committee for the National Convention of "Conservative Soldiers and Sailors"—part of the 1868 Democratic National Convention in New York City. The Soldiers and Sailors convention favored the nomination of Major General Winfield Scott Hancock for president, but were ultimately unsuccessful, as the convention nominated former New York Governor Horatio Seymour. Bragg campaigned vigorously for the Democratic ticket in the fall, though papers commented that he didn't seem to share the candidate's views on African American suffrage. He was a delegate to the 1872 Democratic National Convention, which nominated Horace Greeley.

He was the Democratic nominee for Attorney General of Wisconsin in 1871, but was defeated along with the entire Democratic ticket.

In the hotly contested 1875 United States senate election in the Wisconsin Legislature, Bragg was the choice of the Democratic caucus, believed to be a potential compromise candidate for the fourteen Republicans who had pledged to prevent the re-election of Matthew H. Carpenter. After no candidate was able to obtain a majority through several ballots, a new compromise candidate emerged in Angus Cameron. Cameron was ultimately elected on the 12th ballot.

In more local affairs, Bragg engaged in a years-long feud with Congressman Charles A. Eldredge, who had defeated him running on an anti-war platform in the 1862 congressional election. In 1874, Bragg was successful in defeating Eldredge in local primaries and taking a slate of delegates to the district convention, preventing Eldredge's renomination. The nomination ultimately went to Samuel D. Burchard. Bragg came back two years later, and this time defeated Burchard in his attempt for renomination.

=== Congress ===
Wisconsin's 5th congressional district, 1872–1881

In November 1876, Bragg was elected to represent Wisconsin's 5th congressional district in the 45th United States Congress. Bragg would go on to win re-election in 1878 and 1880, but, after redistricting in 1881, he was unable to win renomination in 1882.

During these six years in Congress, Bragg was chairman of the Committee on Expenditures in the Department of Justice from 1877 to 1879 and of the Committee on War Claims from 1879 to 1881. He was again a delegate to the Democratic National Convention in 1880, which nominated General Winfield Scott Hancock.

Wisconsin's 2nd congressional district, 1882–1891

After the 1880 census, redistricting was carried out and Bragg's county, Fond du Lac, was moved from the 5th congressional district to the 2nd district. Bragg now found himself in an intense contest for renomination against Arthur Delaney of Dodge County. In the days before attended the convention in September, Bragg was arrested and accused of a financial fraud deriving from a transaction with the Tremont House institution in Chicago. Though the charges were eventually dropped, the controversy likely harmed his chances of renomination.

At the convention, the vote deadlocked for hundreds of ballots with delegates for the two candidates unwilling to compromise. The matter was resolved when Bragg had to leave the convention to attend his daughter's wedding—a former ally, Daniel H. Sumner, convinced a group of delegates to pick him as a compromise candidate on the 1,601st ballot. Bragg initially considered an independent bid, but decided against it, stating that he was retiring from politics.

While in Congress, Bragg had been one of only 3 Democrats to vote against the Chinese Exclusion Act of 1882.

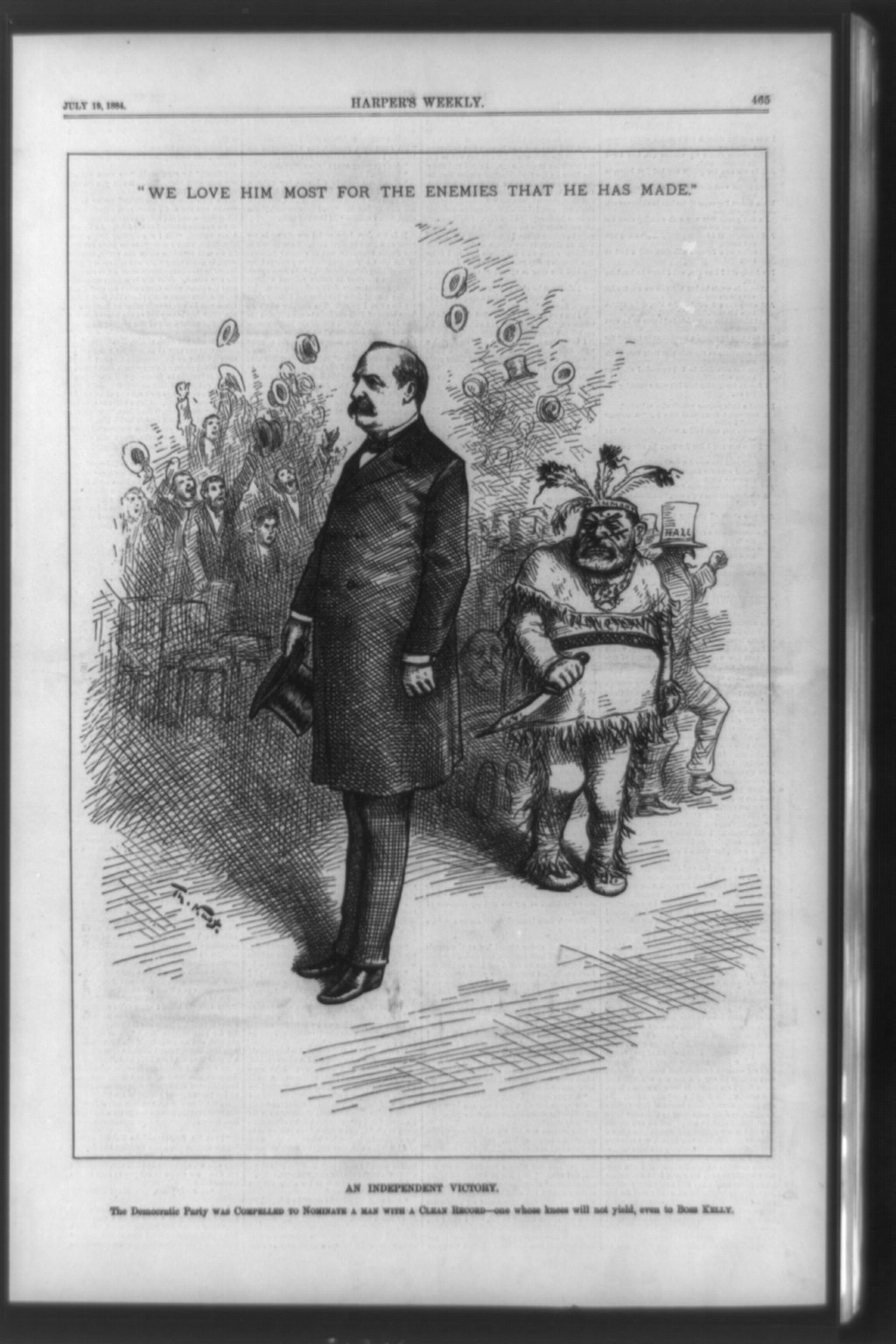
We love him for the enemies he made. In Harper's Weekly, 1884.

General Bragg remained involved in state politics. In 1884, he was again a delegate to the Democratic National Convention. He seconded the nomination of Grover Cleveland for the presidency saying "We love him for the enemies he has made."—referring to Cleveland's conflicts with the corrupt Tammany Hall organization. The phrase became a slogan for the Cleveland campaign, and Cleveland was elected the 22nd President of the United States that November.

That same fall, Bragg again pursued the Democratic nomination for Congress at the district convention, held at Beaver Dam, Wisconsin, in September. Daniel Sumner was seeking renomination, Arthur Delaney was again a chief rival, with Judge Hiram W. Sawyer of Washington County also in the race. The balloting again deadlocked with no candidate able to secure the majority. Before the 150th ballot, Sawyer and Sumner withdrew from the contest, allowing Bragg to win the nomination in a 15–13 vote over Delaney.

Bragg won the November general election with 55% over Republican Samuel S. Barney. During the 49th United States Congress (1885–1887) Bragg was chairman of the Committee on Military Affairs.

In 1886, Bragg again faced a contested convention when seeking renomination. Delaney was his chief rival, again. Once again, a bitter and lengthy convention fight ensued. On the 216th ballot, Delaney was able to secure the nomination from Bragg. Delaney went on to defeat in the general election.

=== Split with Democrats ===
Bragg resumed his law practice in Fond du Lac, Wisconsin, but returned to public office in January 1888, when he was appointed United States Minister (Ambassador) to Mexico by President Grover Cleveland. He served in the role until his successor was appointed and confirmed, in May 1889, under the administration of President Benjamin Harrison. As a diplomat, Bragg was said to have formed a good rapport with Mexican President Porfirio Díaz, and was fond of Mexico and his time there. In 1893, when President Cleveland returned to office, Bragg solicited a re-appointment to the post. Despite strong backing from the Wisconsin congressional delegation in 1893—and when the seat became open again in 1895—Cleveland did not reappoint General Bragg, in what was taken as a snub.

After returning from Mexico in 1889, Bragg again returned to his legal career and state politics. In 1890 he was organizing for another attempt at election to the United States Senate, but ultimately made a deal with William Freeman Vilas, whereby Bragg would support Vilas in 1891 and would have the support of Vilas in the 1893 senate election, assuming Democrats still held a majority in the Wisconsin Legislature at that time. This consideration likely influenced his decision to become involved in the famous Cunningham gerrymandering cases of 1892, in which he litigated on behalf of the Democrats' 1891 redistricting law (1891 Wis. Act 482) before the Wisconsin Supreme Court. The Court, in a bipartisan opinion, sided with the challengers and the district map was struck down as an unconstitutional partisan gerrymander.

Despite the court loss, Democrats won massive majorities in the Wisconsin Legislature in the 1892 elections, but Bragg did not ultimately benefit from it in the senatorial election. The Democratic caucus deadlocked in a three-way race between Bragg, John H. Knight of Ashland, and John L. Mitchell of Milwaukee. On the 31st ballot, the Knight delegation broke in favor of Mitchell. Bragg's supporters saw it as a betrayal by Vilas, who was seen as a supporter of Mitchell. Subsequently, at the 1894 Democratic state convention, Bragg was favored for the nomination for Governor, but refused nomination.

In 1896, Bragg was once again one of the leaders of the Wisconsin delegation to that year's Democratic National Convention in Chicago. Bragg was deeply bothered by the nomination of William Jennings Bryan and the ascendance of the "populist fanatics." Bragg threatened to vote for the Republican, William McKinley. He became one of the leaders of a Democratic schism, called the National Democratic Party, and was a candidate for president at its convention in Indianapolis in September. McKinley went on to win the election, carrying Wisconsin by roughly the exact margin Bragg had predicted—100,000 votes.

The schism would prove permanent for Bragg, who supported McKinley for re-election in 1900, as well as state Republicans, such as gubernatorial candidates Edward Scofield in 1898 and Robert M. La Follette in 1900. In May 1902, President Theodore Roosevelt appointed him consul general in Havana, Cuba, which had recently ratified their U.S.-backed constitution. He was unhappy with the assignment, so, in September 1902, he was reassigned to Hong Kong, then a British crown colony, serving until 1906.

== Family ==
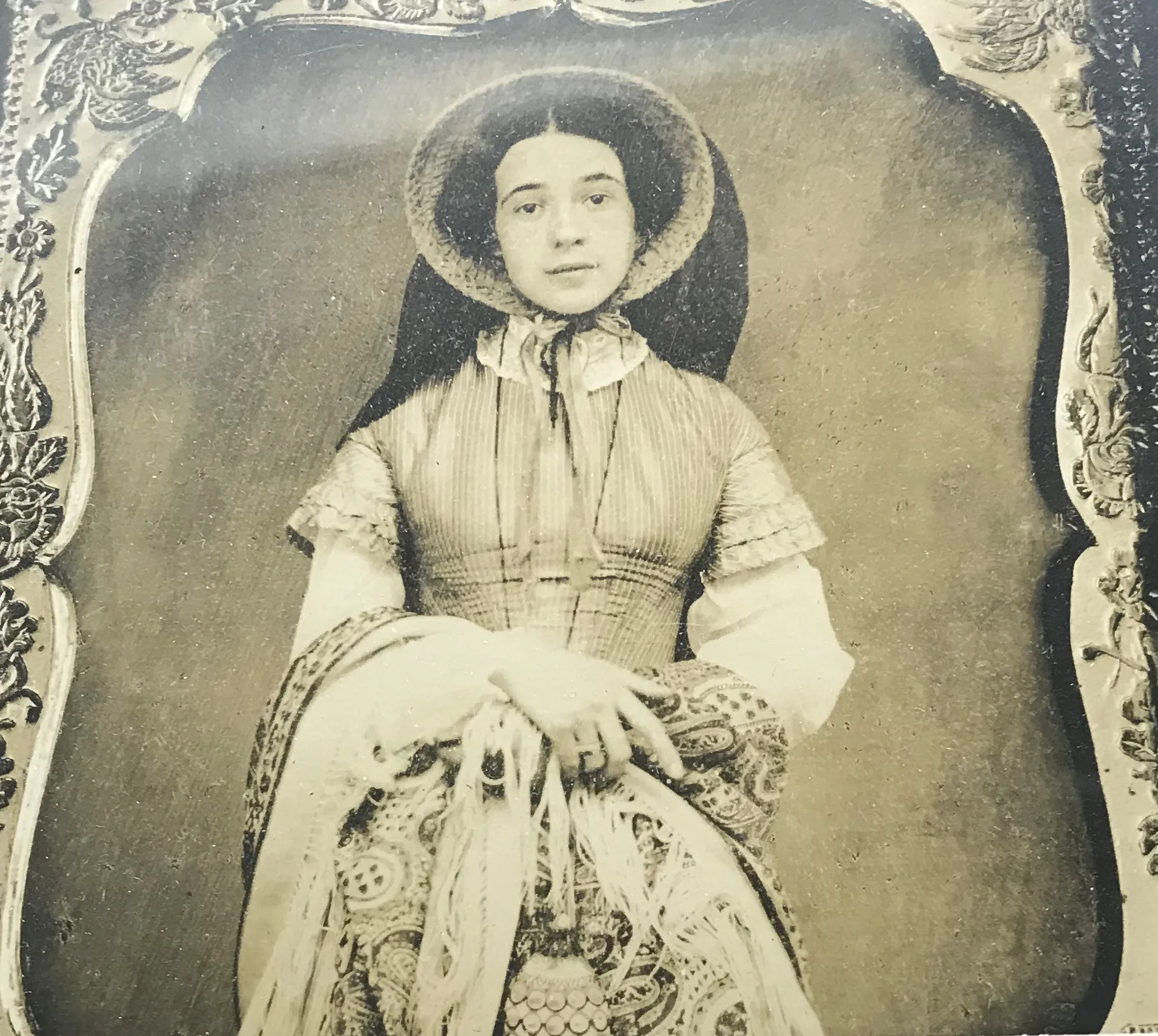
Cornelia, wife of Edward S. Bragg

Bragg married Cornelia Colman on January 2, 1854. Cornelia was a granddaughter of Colonel Nathaniel Rochester, who was the namesake and one of the founders of Rochester, New York. They had three sons and three daughters, though two of their sons died in childhood. Their youngest daughter, Bertha, married George Percival Scriven, who would go on to become the first chairman of the National Advisory Committee for Aeronautics, the forerunner of NASA.

Bragg was a cousin of Frederick William Benteen, a senior captain (brevet brigadier-general) of the U.S. 7th Cavalry under George Armstrong Custer. Benteen was a major figure in the ill-fated Battle of the Little Bighorn and was singled out by Major Marcus Reno for his leadership during the two days of fighting endured by the survivors. Benteen mentioned his relationship to Bragg in a letter to Theodore Goldin dated February 10, 1896 (Benteen-Goldin Letters, Carroll, 1974).

He was also a cousin of Confederate Army General Braxton Bragg. Though the two Braggs were both major participants in the prosecution of the Civil War, they never met in battle.

General Bragg suffered a paralytic stroke on June 19, 1912, and died the next day at his home in Fond du Lac, Wisconsin. He was interred at Fond du Lac's Rienzi Cemetery.

== Electoral history ==
=== U.S. House of Representatives (1862) ===
Wisconsin's 4th Congressional District Election, 1862
Party	Candidate	Votes	%	±%
General Election, November 4, 1862
Democratic	Charles A. Eldredge	15,343	61.50%	
National Union	Edward S. Bragg	9,603	38.50%	
Plurality		5,740	23.01%	
Total votes		24,946	100.0%	
Democratic win (new seat)				

=== U.S. Senate (1867) ===
United States Senate Election in Wisconsin, 1867
Party	Candidate	Votes	%	±%
Vote of the 20th Wisconsin Legislature, January 23, 1867
Republican	Timothy O. Howe (incumbent)	95	71.97%	
Democratic	Charles A. Eldredge	30	22.73%	
Democratic	Edward S. Bragg	2	1.52%	
Democratic	Joshua J. Guppy	1	0.76%	
	Abstaining	4	3.03%	
Plurality		65	48.24%	
Total votes		132	100.0%	
Republican hold				

=== Wisconsin Attorney General (1871) ===
Wisconsin Attorney General Election, 1871
Party	Candidate	Votes	%	±%
General Election, November 7, 1871
Republican	Stephen Steele Barlow (incumbent)	78,326	53.23%	
Democratic	Edward S. Bragg	68,807	46.77%	+0.31%
Plurality		9,519	6.47%	-0.61%
Total votes		147,133	100.0%	
Republican hold				

=== U.S. House of Representatives (1876, 1878, 1880) ===
Wisconsin's 5th Congressional District Election, 1876
Party	Candidate	Votes	%	±%
General Election, November 7, 1876
Democratic	Edward S. Bragg	19,544	58.21%	−3.27%
Republican	George W. Carter	14,031	41.79%	
Plurality		5,513	16.42%	-6.54%
Total votes		33,575	100.0%	+30.78%
Democratic hold				

Wisconsin's 5th Congressional District Election, 1878
Party	Candidate	Votes	%	±%
General Election, November 5, 1878
Democratic	Edward S. Bragg (incumbent)	12,392	46.18%	−12.03%
Republican	Hiram N. Smith	10,285	38.33%	−3.46%
Greenback	David Giddings	4,157	15.49%	
Plurality		2,107	7.85%	-8.57%
Total votes		26,834	100.0%	-20.08%
Democratic hold				

Wisconsin's 5th Congressional District Election, 1880
Party	Candidate	Votes	%	±%
General Election, November 5, 1878
Democratic	Edward S. Bragg (incumbent)	16,984	51.58%	+5.40%
Republican	Elihu Colman	14,753	44.81%	+6.48%
Greenback	John E. Thomas	1,188	3.61%	−11.88%
Plurality		2,231	6.78%	-1.08%
Total votes		32,925	100.0%	+22.70%
Democratic hold				

=== U.S. House of Representatives (1884) ===
Wisconsin's 2nd Congressional District Election, 1884
Party	Candidate	Votes	%	±%
General Election, November 4, 1884
Democratic	Edward S. Bragg	16,865	55.42%	
Republican	Samuel S. Barney	12,643	41.55%	
Prohibition	T. J. Patchen	563	1.85%	
Greenback	W. M. Jones	356	1.17%	
	Scattering	2	0.01%	
Plurality		4,222	13.87%	+5.37%
Total votes		30,429	100.0%	-0.33%
Democratic hold				

== See also ==
- List of American Civil War generals (Union)

== Notes ==
Military offices
Preceded by Lysander Cutler	Command of the 6th Wisconsin Volunteer Infantry Regiment; March 10, 1863 – June 25, 1864	Succeeded by Rufus Dawes
Party political offices
Preceded by Silas U. Pinney	Democratic nominee for Attorney General of Wisconsin; 1871	Succeeded by Leander F. Frisby
Wisconsin Senate
Preceded by George F. Wheeler	Member of the Wisconsin Senate from the 20th district January 1, 1868 – January 1, 1870	Succeeded by Hiram S. Town
U.S. House of Representatives
Preceded by Samuel D. Burchard	Member of the U.S. House of Representatives from Wisconsin's 5th congressional district March 4, 1877 – March 3, 1883	Succeeded by Joseph Rankin
Preceded by Daniel H. Sumner	Member of the U.S. House of Representatives from Wisconsin's 2nd congressional district March 4, 1885 – March 3, 1887	Succeeded by Richard W. Guenther
Preceded by William Rosecrans	Chair of the House Military Affairs Committee; March 4, 1885 – March 3, 1887	Succeeded by Richard W. Townshend
Legal offices
Preceded by William H. Ebbets	District Attorney of Fond du Lac County, Wisconsin; January 1, 1854 – January 1, 1856	Succeeded by Isaac S. Tallmadge
Diplomatic posts
Preceded by Thomas C. Manning	United States Minister to Mexico; January 16, 1888 – May 27, 1889	Succeeded by Thomas Ryan
