= Edward Pier =

19th century American politician

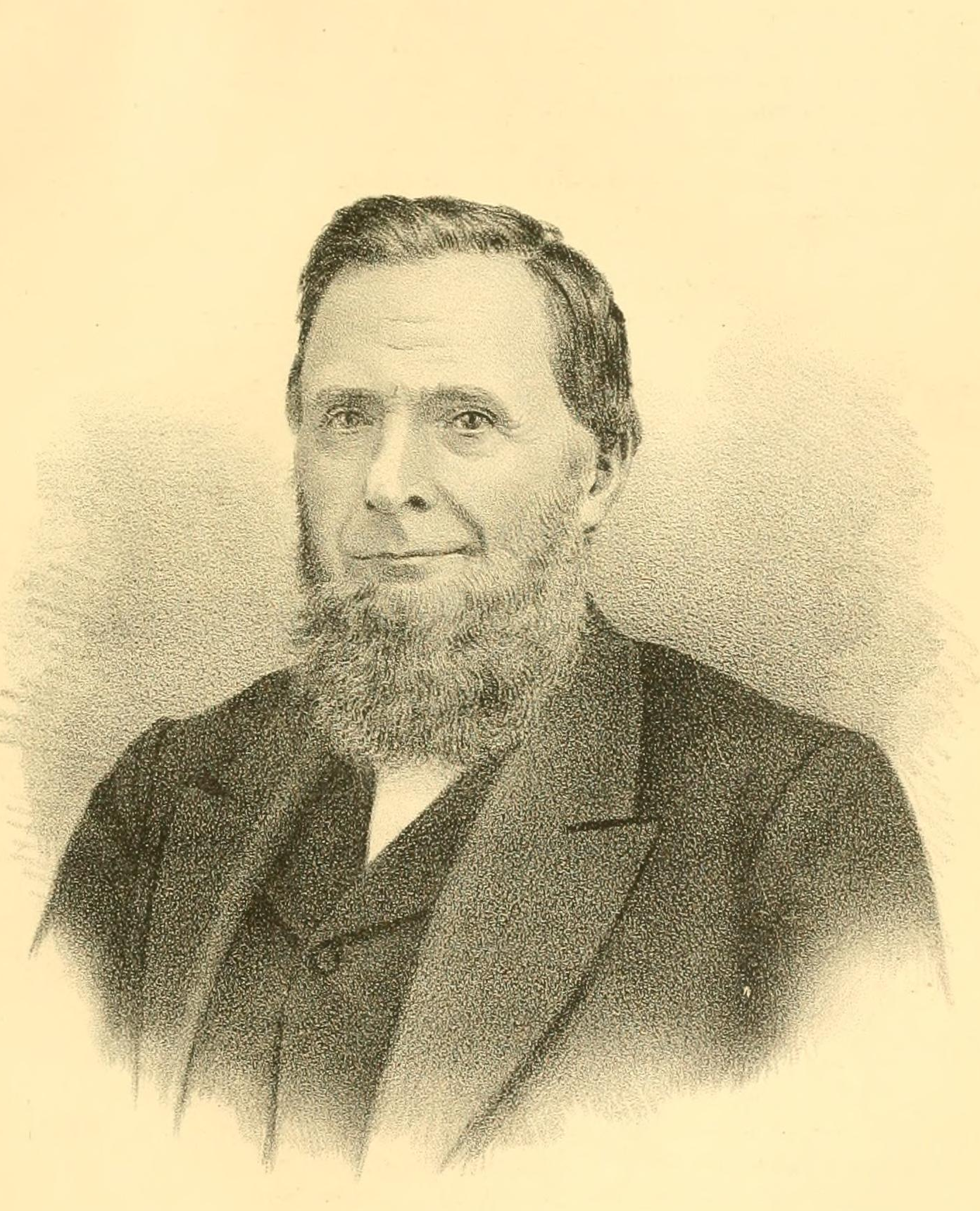
- From The History of Fond du Lac County, Wisconsin (1880)

Member of the Wisconsin Senate from the 20th district
- In office January 7, 1856 – January 2, 1860
- Preceded by: Charles A. Eldredge
- Succeeded by: Elihu L. Phillips

Chairman of the Board of Supervisors of Fond du Lac County, Wisconsin
- In office April 1844 – April 1845
- Preceded by: John J. Driggs
- Succeeded by: Rufus P. Eaton

Personal details
- Born: March 31, 1807 New Haven, Vermont, U.S.
- Died: November 2, 1877 (aged 70) Fond du Lac, Wisconsin, U.S.
- Resting place: Pier Cemetery, Fond du Lac, Wisconsin
- Party: Republican
- Spouse: Harriet Newall Kendall (m. 1829; died 1864)
- Children: Ann (Carpenter)^{(b. 1833; died 1910)}; Ruth Raymond (Harvey)^{(b. 1837; died 1897)}; Colwert Kendall Pier^{(b. 1841; died 1895)}; Carrie Sterns (Skinner)^{(b. 1841; died 1914)}

Edward Pier (March 31, 1807 – November 2, 1877) was an American businessman, politician, and Wisconsin pioneer. He was among the first settlers at what is now Fond du Lac, Wisconsin, and represented Fond du Lac in the Wisconsin State Senate for four years during the 1850s.

== Early life ==
Edward Pier was born in New Haven, Vermont, and raised on his father's farm. He received a common school education until age 12, when his father moved the family to rural Ripton, Vermont, for work. In Ripton, Edward worked to clear their new land for farming, and at night learned the shoemaking craft.

== Settlement in Wisconsin ==
In the Fall of 1834, his father sent him and two brothers—Colwert and Oscar—west to the Michigan Territory to seek new prospects. The brothers first settled at Green Bay. In February 1836 traveled south to what is now Fond du Lac County, Wisconsin, to prospect for land, at the encouragement of James Duane Doty of the Fond du Lac Company. At this time, there was no road through the area other than the indian trails, and they traveled over the frozen Lake Winnebago for a portion of the journey. They met Doty at the mouth of the Fond du Lac River and evaluated the land. After returning to Green Bay, they met with the directors of the Fond du Lac Company and each of the Pier men agreed to purchase adjoining portions of the Fond du Lac land, with an option to extend their purchases for other members of their family if they joined them in Wisconsin.

Colwert returned to their land in the Summer of 1836 and remained there to look after the family's claim, opening the Fond du Lac House inn and tavern, the first such building in the area. Edward made several trips, the first of which was to bring his father to their settlement. On his return, his father commented that their mother would have to come join them, because "three of her children are here now and the rest of them will come, and they will never leave such a country as you and Colwert are in and go back to Vermont." In the Fall of 1836, he made another trip to Colwert's camp to help him stack grain he had harvested. In the Winter, he attempted another trip to bring provisions to his brother, but while traveling over the frozen Lake Winnebago, he and a horse broke through the ice into the icy water. Pier survived, but the horse and provisions were lost.

He finally returned to settle his claim in 1837, bringing with him his wife and infant children. That same year, his father and the rest of his brothers also arrived at Fond du Lac to claim their share of the land. At the time, the Pier house was regarded as the only settlement between Green Bay and Milwaukee. Pier was described as having sowed the first wheat, oats, and peas in Fond du Lac County.

== Political career ==
Fond du Lac County was organized for government purposes under the Wisconsin Territory in 1839, and at the first election, Edward Pier was chosen as one of the three county commissioners—the county commission being the government of the county at that time. He went on to serve on the commission until it was replaced by the board of supervisors in 1842, and was then elected as Fond du Lac's representative on the board of supervisors. He served on the board of supervisors through 1848, and was chairman of the board in 1844. He returned to the county board in 1852 and 1853, serving a total of 12 years on the county commission and county board.

Pier became a member of the Republican Party when it was organized in the 1850s, and in 1855 he was elected to the Wisconsin State Senate running on the Republican ticket. At the time his Senate district, the 20th district, comprised all of Fond du Lac County. He was re-elected in 1857. The 1859 Wisconsin legislative manual incorrectly listed Pier as a Democrat, and the error has propagated to other sources that used that as a reference. There's no evidence he switched party affiliations between his 1857 election and the 1859 legislative session, contemporary newspapers describe him as a Republican, and the 1859 Senate journal shows him voting with the Republican majority and serving as chairman of the Senate Committee on Claims.

After his Senate terms, he was appointed to a state commission for receiving and administering a loan from the federal government, and was appointed a trustee of the State Hospital for the Insane. He was reappointed to the Hospital board in 1865. As a member of the State Agriculture Society, he was involved for years in an effort to fund the establishment of a state agricultural and industrial college.

== Business career ==
On his first arrival, Pier invested extensively in land in Fond du Lac County, and sold off parcels over time, earning significant profit. He reinvested his earnings into businesses in the new town, and maintained a meat market and several manufacturing establishments.

Pier invested in other businesses, and served as a director of the Madison Mutual Insurance Company for nearly 20 years. In 1866, he worked with Edwin H. Galloway to organize the first savings bank in Fond du Lac, the Fond du Lac Savings Bank. Pier served as president of the bank from its founding until his death.

He suffered a serious accident when riding in a horse-drawn buggy in 1874, injuring his spine and shoulders. His family believed that this injury contributed to his death, three years later. He died at the home of his daughter in Fond du Lac, on November 2, 1877.

== Personal life and family ==
Edward Pier was the oldest of seven children born to Calvin Pier and his wife Esther (née Evertts). His father was descended from French Huguenots.

Edward Pier married Harriett N. Kendall on June 2, 1829. They had four children together before her death in 1865. Their twins, Colwert and Carrie, are considered the first white children born in Fond du Lac County, Wisconsin. Colwert went on to serve as a Union Army officer in the American Civil War.

Wisconsin Senate
| Preceded by Charles A. Eldredge | Member of the Wisconsin Senate from the 20th district January 7, 1856 – January 2, 1860 | Succeeded by Elihu L. Phillips |
