= Jehdeiah Bowen =

American politician

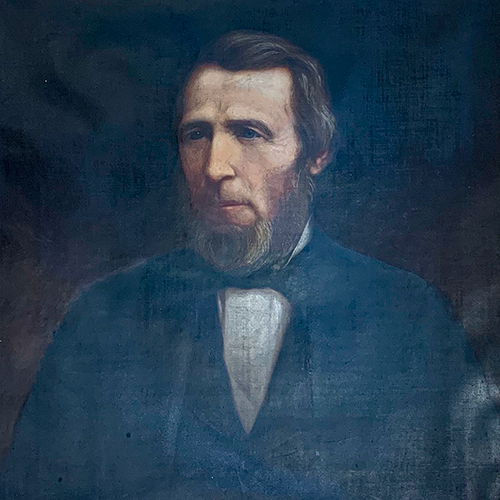
1883 portrait of Bowen

Jehdeiah Bowen (July 19, 1817 – November 18, 1891) was a native of Wales who emigrated to the United States and became an American merchant, pioneer, and politician.

A resident of Carbondale, Pennsylvania from 1830 until the 1850s, he relocated to Ripon, Wisconsin, where he established a knitting factory and worked with Alvan E. Bovay to form a chapter of the Republican Party. A member of the Democratic Party at the time, Bowen was later described by Bovay as his "chief helper" in making the new chapter a reality.

In addition he helped to found Ripon College.

== Biography ==
Born in Llanelly, Brecknockshire, Wales, Bowen emigrated from home in 1830. Traveling to the United States, he settled in Carbondale, Pennsylvania and found work as a store clerk.

In 1850, Bowen moved to Ripon, Wisconsin, where he established a knitting factory and became active in civic affairs.

He helped to found Ripon College.

Active as a Democrat in local and state politics, Bowen worked with Alvan E. Bovay to found a new Wisconsin chapter of the Republican Party.

Bowen served as mayor of Ripon, Wisconsin in 1859 and 1868. In 1871, Bowen served in the Wisconsin State Assembly.

He died in Ripon, Wisconsin on November 19, 1891.
