= George Mitchell (Wisconsin politician) =

American politician

George Woodruff Mitchell (September 19, 1822 – February 16, 1908) was a member of the Wisconsin State Senate as a Democrat. Mitchell represented the 20th District during the 1862 and 1863 sessions. He was born in St. Albans, Vermont and lived in Ripon, Wisconsin in the 1860s. He was also involved in the lumber and life insurance businesses. He died in Milwaukee and was buried there at Forest Home Cemetery.
