= Bullen =

Bullen is a surname, and may refer to:

- Arthur Henry Bullen (1857–1920), English editor, publisher, and a specialist in 16th and 17th century literature
- Charles Bullen, British military officer
- Charles Bullen (Utah politician), American politician
- John Bullen Jr. (1803–1884), American politician, co-founder of Kenosha, Wisconsin
- Keith Bullen (poet)
- Keith Edward Bullen (1906–1976), New Zealand-born mathematician and geophysicist
- Lee Bullen (born 1971), Scottish professional footballer
- Marc Bullen (born 1982), Australian rules footballer
- Nicholas Bullen (born 1968), English musician and artist
- Stafford Bullen (1925–2001), Australian circus proprietor and co-founder of the African Lion Safari at Warragamba and Bullen's Animal World.
- Teddy Bullen (1884–1917), English footballer
- William Bullen (18th century), English cricketer
- William Bullen (Kenosha pioneer), (1805–1846), American politician, co-founder of Kenosha, Wisconsin
- Winslow Bullen (1826–1909), American politician, co-founder of Arlington, Wisconsin

== See also ==
- Anne Bullen, also spelt as Anne Boleyn, and her family (see Boleyn page)
