= Josiah D. Arnold =

19th century American businessman and politician

Josiah Arnold
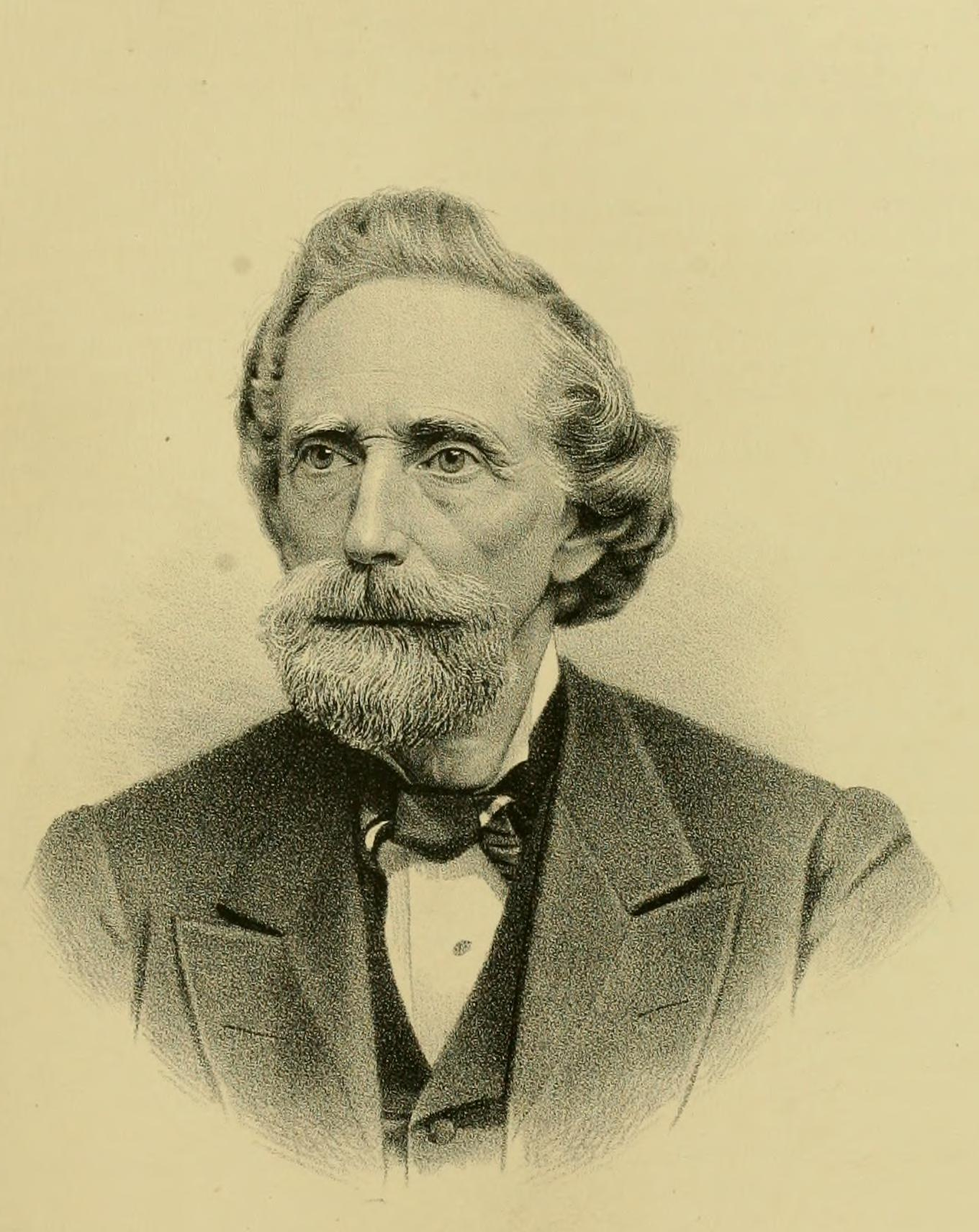
- Portrait from The History of Columbia County, Wisconsin (1880)

16th Mayor of Portage, Wisconsin
- In office April 1877 – April 1881
- Preceded by: William W. Corning
- Succeeded by: Andrew Jackson Turner

Member of the Wisconsin State Assembly from the Columbia 1st district
- In office January 7, 1878 – January 6, 1879
- Preceded by: David Owen
- Succeeded by: Charles Randall Gallett

Register of Deeds of Columbia County, Wisconsin
- In office January 6, 1851 – January 3, 1853
- Preceded by: F. F. Farnham
- Succeeded by: William Owen

Personal details
- Born: November 1, 1820 Washington, Massachusetts, U.S.
- Died: March 10, 1903 (aged 82) Janesville, Wisconsin, U.S.
- Resting place: Oak Hill Cemetery, Janesville, Wisconsin
- Party: Democratic

Josiah D. Arnold (November 1, 1820 – March 10, 1903) was an American businessman, Democratic politician, and Wisconsin pioneer. He was the 16th mayor of Portage, Wisconsin (1877–1881), and represented Columbia County in the Wisconsin State Assembly for the 1878 session.

== Biography ==
Arnold was born in Washington, Berkshire County, Massachusetts. Arnold moved to Janesville, Wisconsin Territory, in 1843. He then moved to Columbus, Columbia County, Wisconsin Territory in 1846 and finally moved to Portage, Wisconsin in 1852. Arnold was a merchant and lumber dealer. Arnold served as clerk of the Wisconsin Circuit Court for Columbia County in 1848 and 1849. He then served as register of deeds for Columbia County in 1851 and 1852. Arnold was a Democrat. From 1854 to 1858, Arnold served on the Portage Common Council. In 1877, Arnold served as mayor of Portage. In 1878, Arnold served in the Wisconsin Assembly. He moved back to Janesville and was in the real estate and insurance business.

Arnold died at his home in Janesville, Wisconsin from heart problems. He was buried at Oak Hill Cemetery in Janesville.

Wisconsin State Assembly
| Preceded by David Owen | Member of the Wisconsin State Assembly from the Columbia 1st district January 7, 1878 – January 6, 1879 | Succeeded by Charles Randall Gallett |
Political offices
| Preceded by F. F. Farnham | Register of Deeds of Columbia County, Wisconsin; January 6, 1851 – January 3, 1853 | Succeeded by William Owen |
| Preceded by William W. Corning | Mayor of Portage, Wisconsin; April 1877 – April 1881 | Succeeded by Jack Turner |
