= Samuel S. Brannan =

19th century American politician

13th Mayor of Portage, Wisconsin
- In office April 1871 – April 1873
- Preceded by: Charles Randall Gallett
- Succeeded by: Charles Randall Gallett

Member of the Wisconsin State Assembly from the Columbia 1st district
- In office January 6, 1873 – January 5, 1874
- Preceded by: William W. Corning
- Succeeded by: Jonathan Bowman

Personal details
- Born: February 5, 1835 Silver Creek, New York, U.S.
- Died: April 5, 1880 (aged 45) Portage, Wisconsin, U.S.
- Cause of death: Tuberculosis
- Party: Republican
- Occupation: Newspaper editor

Samuel Stephen Brannan (February 5, 1835 – April 5, 1880) was an American newspaper editor, Republican politician, and Wisconsin pioneer. He was the 13th mayor of Portage, Wisconsin, and represented northern Columbia County in the Wisconsin State Assembly during the 1873 session.

== Biography ==
Born in Silver Creek, New York, Brannan moved with his parents to Wisconsin in 1849 and settled in Portage, Wisconsin in 1850. He was one of the owners of the Portage Daily Register, and he founded the Wisconsin State Register in 1860. He served on the Columbia County, Wisconsin Board of Supervisors, the Portage Common Council, and was city marshal. Brannan served as Mayor of Portage in 1872 and 1873. He then served in the Wisconsin State Assembly in 1873 as a Republican. Then, Brannan served as postmaster of Portage, Wisconsin until his death. He died of tuberculosis in Portage, Wisconsin.

Wisconsin State Assembly
Preceded by William W. Corning	Member of the Wisconsin State Assembly from the Columbia 1st district January 6, 1873 – January 5, 1874	Succeeded by Jonathan Bowman
Political offices
Preceded by Charles Randall Gallett	Mayor of Portage, Wisconsin; April 1871 – April 1873	Succeeded by Charles Randall Gallett
