= Michael Griffin (Wisconsin politician) =

19th century American politician

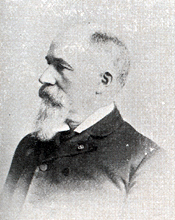

Member of the U.S. House of Representatives from Wisconsin's 7th district
- In office November 5, 1894 – March 3, 1899
- Preceded by: George B. Shaw
- Succeeded by: John J. Esch

Member of the Wisconsin Senate from the 30th district
- In office January 1, 1880 – January 1, 1882
- Preceded by: Abraham D. Andrews
- Succeeded by: Rockwell J. Flint

Member of the Wisconsin State Assembly from the Columbia 1st district
- In office January 1, 1876 – January 1, 1877
- Preceded by: Marcus Barden
- Succeeded by: David Owen

Personal details
- Born: September 9, 1842 County Clare, Ireland, U.K.
- Died: December 29, 1899 (aged 57) Eau Claire, Wisconsin, U.S.
- Cause of death: Stroke
- Resting place: Forest Hill Cemetery; Eau Claire, Wisconsin
- Party: Republican
- Spouse: Emma Irene Daniels (m. 1871–1899)
- Parents: John Griffin (father); Hannah Griffin (mother)

Military service
- Allegiance: United States
- Branch/service: United States Volunteers; Union Army
- Years of service: 1861–1865
- Rank: 1st Lieutenant, USV
- Unit: 12th Reg. Wis. Vol. Infantry
- Battles/wars: American Civil War: Vicksburg campaign; Siege of Vicksburg; Atlanta campaign; Battle of Kennesaw Mountain; Battle of Atlanta; Carolinas campaign; Battle of Bentonville

Michael Griffin (September 9, 1842 – December 29, 1899) was an Irish American immigrant, lawyer, and Republican politician. He was a member of the United States House of Representatives, representing western Wisconsin from 1894 to 1899. He also served two years in the Wisconsin Senate and one year in the State Assembly. As a young man, he served as a Union Army officer through nearly the entire American Civil War.

== Early life ==
Born in County Clare on the island of Ireland (the entirety of which was then part of the U.K.), Griffin immigrated with his parents, John and Hannah Griffin, to the British Canadian colonies in 1847, and then to Ohio in 1851. He moved to Wisconsin in 1856 and settled in Newport, Sauk County. He attended the common schools of Ohio and Wisconsin.

On September 11, 1861, he enlisted as a private in the Union Army for service in the American Civil War. He was enrolled in Company E, 12th Wisconsin Infantry Regiment, and served until the close of the war, attaining the rank of first lieutenant.

He moved to Kilbourn City, Wisconsin, after the war, in 1865. He studied law and was admitted to the bar in 1868, commencing practice in Kilbourn City. He married Emma Irene Daniels on September 6, 1871. He was cashier of the Bank of Kilbourn from 1871 until 1876.

== Political career ==
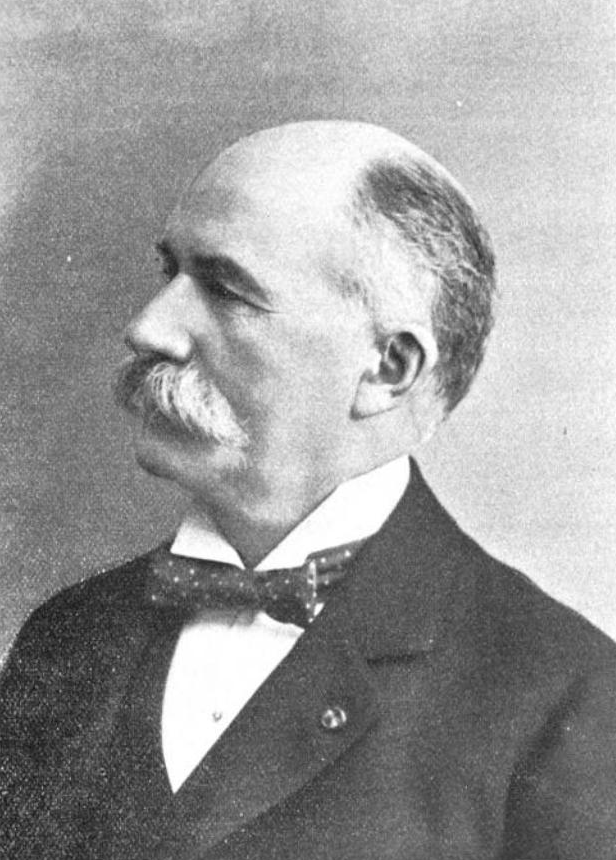
Portrait from Proceedings of the State Bar Association of Wisconsin Vol. 3

He served as member of the County Board of Columbia County, Wisconsin, in 1874 and 1875. He served as member of the Wisconsin State Assembly in 1876. He moved to Eau Claire, Wisconsin, in 1876, and was City attorney of Eau Claire in 1878 and 1879. He served in the Wisconsin State Senate in 1880 and 1881.

He was the department commander of the Grand Army of the Republic in 1887 and 1888. In 1894, he was elected as a Republican to the Fifty-third Congress to fill the vacancy in Wisconsin's 7th congressional district caused by the death of George B. Shaw. He was reelected to the following two congresses as well, serving from November 5, 1894, to March 3, 1899. He was not a candidate for renomination in 1898.

He was appointed chairman of the State tax commission by Governor Edward Scofield on May 28, 1899.

== Later life ==
He died of a stroke in Eau Claire, Wisconsin, on December 29, 1899. He was interred in Eau Claire's Forest Hill Cemetery. In 1972, he posthumously received a single protest vote for vice president by a disgruntled delegate in that year's Democratic National Convention.

== Electoral history ==
=== Wisconsin Assembly (1875) ===
Wisconsin Assembly, Columbia 1st District Election, 1875
Party	Candidate	Votes	%	±%
General Election, November 2, 1875
Republican	Michael Griffin	911	58.36%	+7.83%
Democratic	O. D. Coleman	650	41.64%	
Plurality		261	16.72%	+15.65%
Total votes		1,561	100.0%	-7.30%
Republican hold				

=== Wisconsin Senate (1879) ===
Wisconsin Senate, 30th District Election, 1879
Party	Candidate	Votes	%	±%
General Election, November 4, 1879
Republican	Michael Griffin	4,374	68.06%	+11.38%
Democratic	W. H. Smith	1,726	26.86%	−16.47%
Greenback	Joel Foster	327	5.09%	
Plurality		2,648	41.20%	+27.85%
Total votes		6,427	100.0%	-8.43%
Republican hold				

=== U.S. House of Representatives (1894, 1896) ===
Wisconsin's 7th Congressional District Special Election, 1894
Party	Candidate	Votes	%	±%
Special Election, November 6, 1894
Republican	Michael Griffin	17,766	57.77%	+9.25%
Democratic	George W. Levis	9,992	32.49%	−8.85%
Populist	Clement H. Van Wormer	1,619	5.26%	+0.29%
Prohibition	Edward Berg	1,249	4.06%	−1.11%
Independent	William F. Button	125	0.41%	
	Scattering	1	0.00%	
Plurality		7,774	25.28%	+27.85%
Total votes		30,752	100.0%	-2.76%
Republican hold				

Wisconsin's 7th Congressional District Election, 1894
Party	Candidate	Votes	%	±%
General Election, November 6, 1894
Republican	Michael Griffin	17,489	57.36%	−0.41%
Democratic	George W. Levis	9,996	32.78%	+0.29%
Populist	Clement H. Van Wormer	1,626	5.33%	+0.07%
Prohibition	Edward Berg	1,250	4.10%	+0.04%
Independent	William F. Button	128	0.42%	+0.01%
	Scattering	1	0.00%	
Plurality		7,493	24.58%	-0.70%
Total votes		30,490	100.0%	-0.85%
Republican hold				

Wisconsin's 7th Congressional District Election, 1896
Party	Candidate	Votes	%	±%
General Election, November 3, 1896
Republican	Michael Griffin (incumbent)	24,073	65.80%	+8.44%
Democratic	Caleb M. Hilliard	11,718	32.03%	−0.75%
Prohibition	James H. Moseley	791	2.16%	+0.07%
	Scattering	1	0.00%	
Plurality		12,355	33.77%	+9.20%
Total votes		36,583	100.0%	+19.98%
Republican hold				

Wisconsin State Assembly
Preceded by Marcus Barden	Member of the Wisconsin State Assembly from the Columbia 1st district January 1, 1876 – January 1, 1877	Succeeded by David Owen
Wisconsin Senate
Preceded by Abraham D. Andrews	Member of the Wisconsin Senate from the 30th district 1880 – 1882	Succeeded by Rockwell J. Flint
U.S. House of Representatives
Preceded by George B. Shaw	Member of the U.S. House of Representatives from Wisconsin's 7th congressional district November 5, 1894 – March 3, 1899	Succeeded by John J. Esch
