= Robert B. Sanderson =

American politician

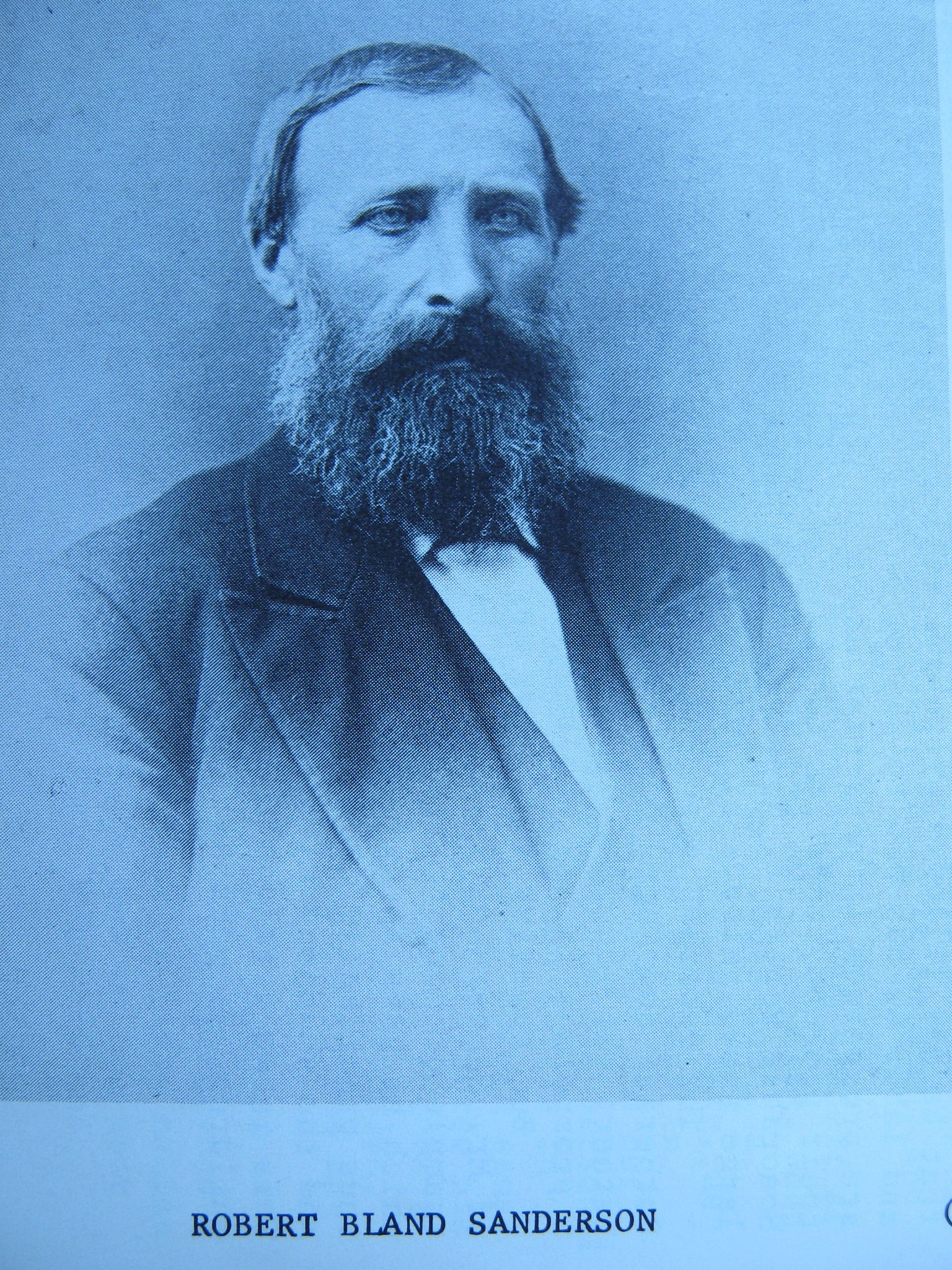
Robert Bland Sanderson (1825–1887), a Wisconsin senator and University of Wisconsin regent

Robert Bland Sanderson (February 25, 1825 – June 18, 1887) was an American businessman, farmer, rancher and politician from Columbia County, Wisconsin who represented part or all of Columbia County in the Wisconsin State Assembly and the Wisconsin State Senate at various times in the 1860s, before moving to Texas and becoming a prominent businessman in Tom Green County.

== Background ==
He was born in Slaidburn, West Riding of Yorkshire, England in 1825, and moved to the United States at the age of 23, arriving in New York City and moving on to Buffalo, New York, where he went into the slaughtering business for a couple of years. In 1850, he sold out and moved to Wisconsin, and became a farmer and rancher. In 1851, his younger brother Thomas Sanderson left Slaidburn and came to Wisconsin with his wife and children, joining his brother in Columbia County.

In 1856, Robert Sanderson married Mary Currie, daughter of an immigrant from Scotland. From 1858 to 1860, he was on the town board of Springvale in Columbia County, serving in 1860 as its chairman. His brother Thomas was treasurer of Springvale in 1859.

As of 1862, when he first appeared in the Assembly, he was 36 years of age, and had been in Wisconsin for 12 years; he was at that time a resident of Cambria, and a member of the Republican Party.

== Legislative service ==
He was first elected to the Assembly for the 1862 session, representing the 3rd Columbia County district (Courtland, Fort Winnebago, Marcellon, Randolph, Scott, Springvale and Wyocena, succeeding James H. Bonney (also a farmer and a Republican). He was assigned to the standing committee on railroads. He was succeeded in the 1863 term by Yates Ashley, a fellow Republican.

Sanderson (now living in Poynette) returned to the Assembly for the 1866 session, this time from the 2nd Columbia County district, succeeding Jesse Hand, another farmer and member of the Union Party (the label which the Republicans were using during this era). He was assigned to the committees on the expiration and re-enactment of laws; and on agriculture and manufactures.

In 1867, Sanderson advanced to the Senate to represent the 25th Senate District (Columbia County) (he succeeded Jonathan Bowman in the Senate, and was succeeded in the Assembly by Ira Ford, both of the same party with himself); and was assigned to the committees on roads, bridges and ferries; and on engrossed bills. He was also a member of the Board of Regents for the University of Wisconsin. He returned in 1868, although by that time the Union Party label had been abandoned; he was assigned to the committees on privileges and elections; on agriculture; and on railroads (chairing the latter). He was re-appointed to a new term as a regent, and served in that capacity through 1873, including serving on the executive committee of the Board of Regents. He was succeeded in 1869 by fellow Republican William M. Griswold.

== After the legislature ==
By 1870, he had moved to "'76 Farm" in Dane County four miles outside of Madison, where he raised Clydesdales, shorthorn cattle and other livestock. In 1870, he was the unsuccessful candidate for the 2nd Assembly district of that County against Democrat Knudt Heimdahl, with 751 votes to Heidal's 858; his brother Thomas was elected to Robert's old 2nd Columbia County Assembly seat at that same election. In 1871, Robert was one of the directors of the Chicago and Superior Railroad Company. He was also involved in the creation of the Madison and Portage Railway.

== Gone to Texas ==
In 1876 Sanderson sold all his interests in Wisconsin and moved to Texas, whose climate and custom of free range husbandry suited his preferences. After a period as a sheep dealer in San Antonio, he joined his sons in a partnership with J. I. Case (like himself, a former Republican Wisconsin State Senator) and Eli Stilson, raising cattle and sheep. When the partnership dissolved, Case and Stilson took the cattle, and the Sandersons moved to San Angelo, where they continued mostly in the sheep business. When the San Angelo National Bank was organized, Sanderson was elected its president, and held that office until his death on June 18, 1887. He and Mary Currie Sanderson had four sons and two daughters.
