= Robert F. Young =

American novelist

Robert Franklin Young
- Born: June 8, 1915; Silver Creek, New York, U.S.
- Died: June 22, 1986 (aged 71); Silver Creek, New York, U.S.

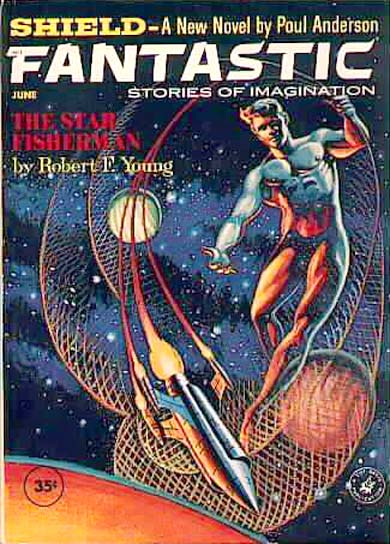
Young's novelette "The Star Fisherman" took the cover of the June 1962 issue of Fantastic

Robert Franklin Young (June 8, 1915 – June 22, 1986) was an American science fiction writer born in Silver Creek, New York. Except for the three and a half years he served in the Pacific Theatre during World War II, he spent most of his life in New York State. He owned a property on Lake Erie.

He remained little-known by the public, in the United States as well as abroad. His career spanned more than thirty years, and he wrote fiction until he died. Only near the end of his life did the science fiction community learn he had been a janitor in the Buffalo public school system.

His production started in 1953 in Startling Stories, then Playboy, The Saturday Evening Post and Collier's. It mainly consisted of a long list of short stories with a poetic and romantic style which led to his work being compared to Ray Bradbury and Theodore Sturgeon. A good deal of these stories have been published in France by Galaxie, Fiction and the science fiction anthologies in the Livre de Poche. In Italy most of his short stories were published at Urania.

His most famous short stories are perhaps "The Dandelion Girl" which influenced the director of the anime series RahXephon, and "Little Dog Gone" which was nominated in 1965 for the Hugo Award for Best Short Story.

== Works ==
=== Novels ===
Robert F. Young wrote only five novels, including La Quete de la Sainte Grille (1975), an expansion of his short story "The Quest of the Holy Grille" which was released only in France and written in French. The remaining four novels are:

- Starfinder (1980)
- The Last Yggdrasill (1982)
- Eridahn (1983)
- The Vizier's Second Daughter (1985)

=== Short stories ===
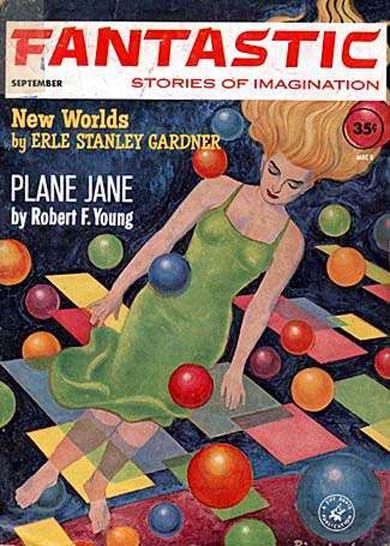
Young's novelette "Plane Jane" was the cover story for the September 1962 issue of Fantastic

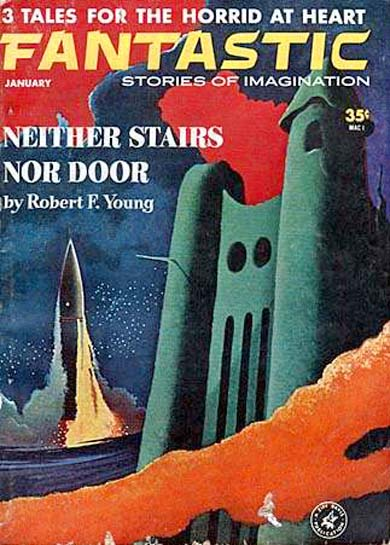
Young's "Neither Stairs nor Door" was the cover story for the January 1963 issue of Fantastic

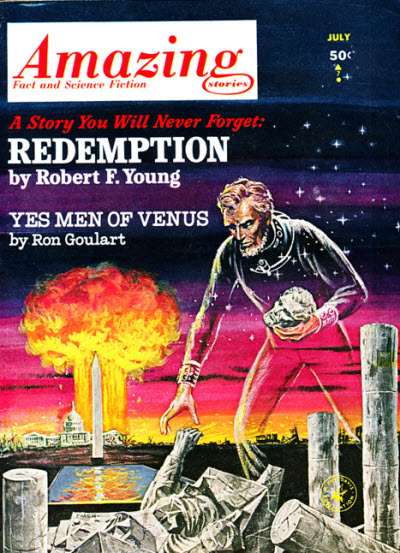
Young's novella "Redemption" took the cover of the July 1963 issue of Amazing Stories

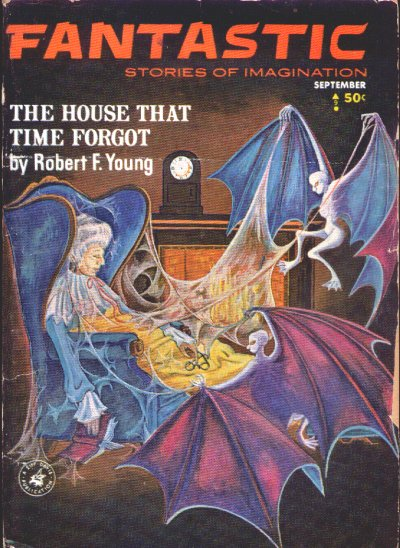
Young's novelette "The House That Time Forgot" was the cover story for the September 1963 issue of Fantastic

- "Above This Race of Men"
- "Abyss of Tartarus"
- "Added Inducement"
- "Adventures of the Last Earthman in His Search for Love"
- "Alec's Anabasis"
- "Arena of Decisions"
- "As a Man Has s Whale a Love Story"
- "The Black Deep Thou Wingest"
- "The Blonde from Barsoom"
- "Boarding Party"
- "Boy Meets Dyevitza"
- "Chrome Pastures"
- "City of Beasts"
- "City of Brass"
- "Clay Suburb"
- "The Courts Of Jamshyd"
- "Cousins"
- "Crutch"
- "The Curious Case of Henry Dickens"
- "The Dandelion Girl"
- "Darkspace"
- "The Day the Limited Was Late"
- "The Decayed Leg Bone"
- "The Deep Space Scrolls"
- "Deluge II"
- "Dialogue in a Twenty-First Century Dining Room"
- "Divine Wind"
- "Doll-Friend"
- "Down the Ladder"
- "A Drink Of Darkness"
- "The Earth Books"
- "Emily and the Bards Sublime"
- "The Eternal Lovers"
- "Findokin's Way"
- "The First Mars Mission"
- "Fleuve Red"
- "Flying Pan"
- "The Forest of Unreason"
- "The Fugitives"
- "The Garden in the Forest"
- "Genesis 500"
- "Ghosts"
- "Ghur R'Hut Urr"
- "The Giant, the Colleen, and the Twenty-One Cows"
- "The Giantess"
- "The Girl in his Mind"
- "Girl Saturday"
- "The Girl Who Made Time Stop"
- "A Glass of Mars"
- "A Glass of Stars"
- "Glass Houses"
- "Glimpses"
- "Goddess in Granite"
- "The Grownup People's Feet"
- "The Hand"
- "The Haute Bourgeoisie"
- "Hex Factor"
- "Hologirl"
- "The Honeyearthers"
- "Hopsoil"
- "The House That Time Forgot"
- "I Bring Fresh Flowers"
- "In Saturn's Rings"
- "In what Cavern of the Deep"
- "Invitation to the Waltz"
- "Jonathan and the Space Whale"
- "The Journal of Nathaniel Worth"
- "Jungle Doctor"
- "Jupiter Found"
- "Kingdom Come, Inc."
- "A Knyght Ther Was"
- "L'Arc De Jeanne"
- "Let There Be Night"
- "Little Dog Gone"
- "Little Red Schoolhouse"
- "Lord of Rays"
- "The Lost Earthman"
- "Mars Child"
- "Milton Inglorious"
- "The Mindanao Deep"
- "Mine Eyes Have Seen The Glory"
- "Minutes of a Meeting at the Mitre"
- "The Moon of Advanced Learning"
- "More Stately Mansions"
- "Neither Do They Reap"
- "Neither Stairs Nor Door"
- "New Route to the Indies"
- "Nikita Eisenhower Jones"
- "No Deposit, No Refill"
- "O Little Town of Bethlehem II"
- "One Love Have I"
- "On the River"
- "Origin of Species"
- "P R N D L L"
- "Passage to Gomorrah"
- "A Pattern For Penelope"
- "Peeping Tommy"
- "Perchance to Dream"
- "Pithecanthropus astralis"
- "Plane Jane"
- "The Princess of Akkir"
- "Production Problem"
- "Project Hi-Rise"
- "Promised Planet"
- "The Quest of the Holy Grille"
- "Redemption"
- "Reflections"
- "Remnants of Things Past"
- "Report on the Sexual Behavior on Arcturus X"
- "Revolution 20"
- "Romance in a Twenty-First Century Used-Car Lot"
- "Romance in an Eleventh-Century Recharging Station"
- "Rumpelstiltskinski"
- "Santa Clause"
- "The Second Philadelphia Experiment"
- "The Servant Problem"
- "Shakespeare of the Apes"
- "The Space Roc"
- "Spacetrack"
- "The Sphinx"
- "St. George and the Dragonmotive"
- "Star Mother"
- "The Star of Stars"
- "The Stars Are Calling, Mr. Keats"
- "The Star Eel"
- "The Star Fisherman"
- "Starscape with Frieze of Dreams"
- "Stop-Over"
- "Storm over Sodom"
- "The Summer of the Fallen Star"
- "Sweet Tooth"
- "Techmech"
- "The Tents of Kedar"
- "There Was an Old Woman Who Lived in a Shoe"
- "Thirty Days Had September"
- "The Thousand Injuries of Mr. Courtney"
- "Three-Mile Syndrome"
- "Tinkerboy"
- "To Fell a Tree"
- "To Touch a Star"
- "Universes"
- "Victim of the Year"
- "Visionary Shapes"
- "What Bleak Land"
- "When Time Was New"
- "Whom the Gods Love"
- "The Winning of Gloria Grandonwheels"
- "Wish Upon A Star"
- "Written In The Stars"
- "The Years"
- "Your Ghost Will Walk"
- "Yours, -Guy"
