= Thomas Sanderson (Wisconsin politician) =

19th century American politician

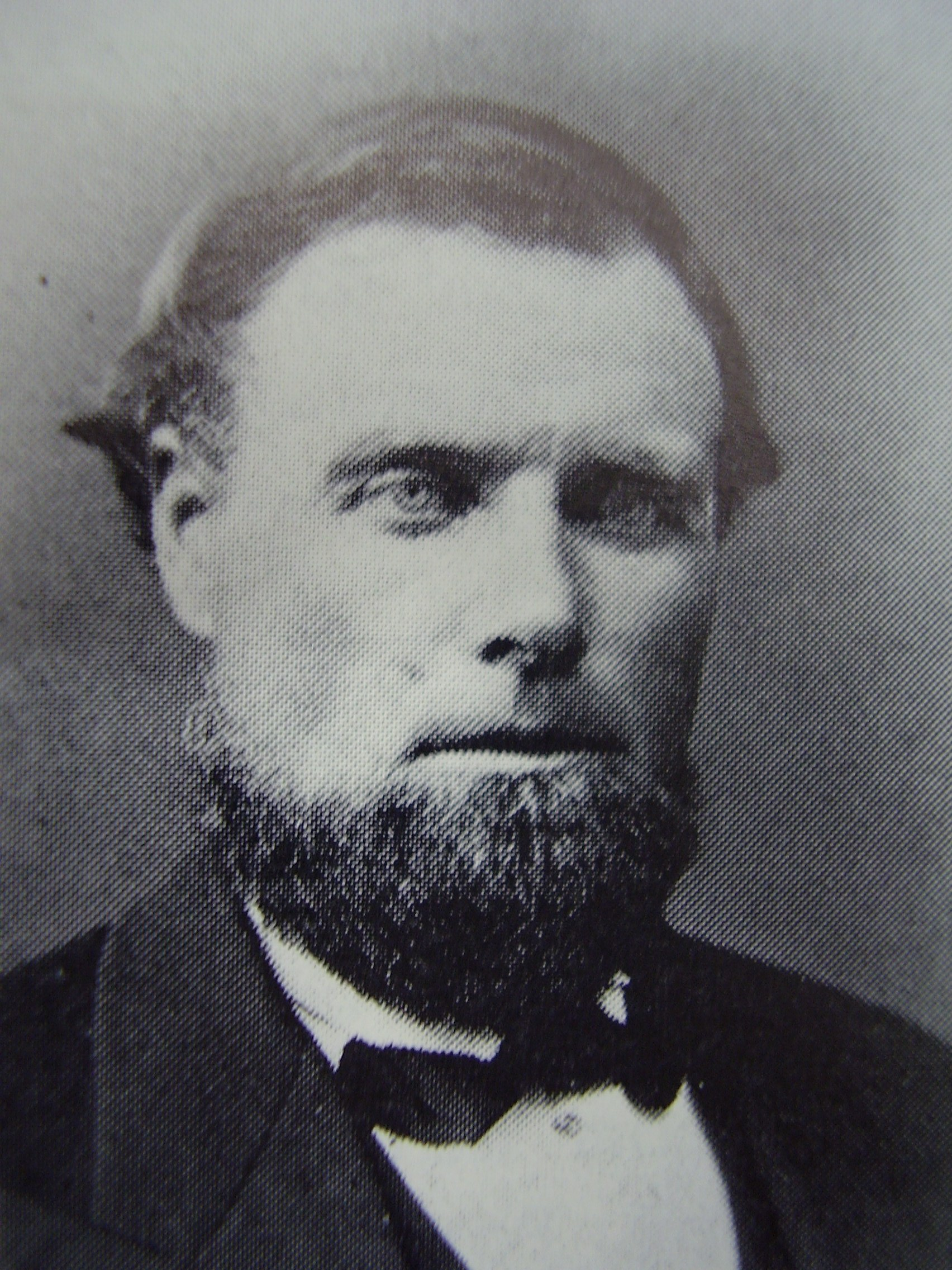

Member of the Wisconsin State Assembly from the Columbia 2nd district
- In office January 2, 1871 – January 1, 1872
- Preceded by: Winslow Bullen
- Succeeded by: Henry Charles Brace

Personal details
- Born: September 13, 1827 Slaidburn, England, UK
- Died: October 11, 1912 (aged 85) Poynette, Wisconsin, U.S.
- Resting place: Hillside Cemetery, Poynette, Wisconsin
- Party: Republican
- Spouse: married
- Children: Etta (Marlatt)
- Relatives: Robert B. Sanderson (brother)

Thomas Sanderson (September 13, 1827 – October 11, 1912) was an English American immigrant, farmer, and Republican politician. He served one term in the Wisconsin State Assembly, representing Columbia County.

== Biography ==
Sanderson was born in Slaidburn, West Riding of Yorkshire, England. In 1851, he left Slaidburn and came to Wisconsin with his wife and children, joining his brother Robert in Columbia County by 1851. He was elected treasurer of the Town of Springvale in 1859, and chairman of the Town of Leeds from 1864 to 1865.

As of 1871, when he first appeared in the Assembly, he was 43 years of age, and had been in Wisconsin for 19 years; he was at that time a resident of Leeds, and a member of the Republican Party.

== Legislative service ==
He was elected to the Assembly for the 1871 session, to his brother Robert's old Assembly seat (Columbia County's 2nd Assembly district), with 690 votes to 681 for Democrat Silas Axtell (incumbent Republican Winslow Bullen was not a candidate). He was assigned to the standing committee on enrolled bills, which he chaired. The Columbia County Assembly seats were redistricted in 1871; portions of his old district were assigned to the 2nd and 3rd districts. Sanderson was not a candidate for re-election; the two seats were both filled by Republicans (Henry Charles Brace and Jacob Low, respectively).

== Retirement and death ==
He died at his home in Poynette, Wisconsin on October 11, 1912, where he had been living since his retirement twenty years before.
