= Springvale, Columbia County, Wisconsin =

Springvale, Wisconsin
- Town
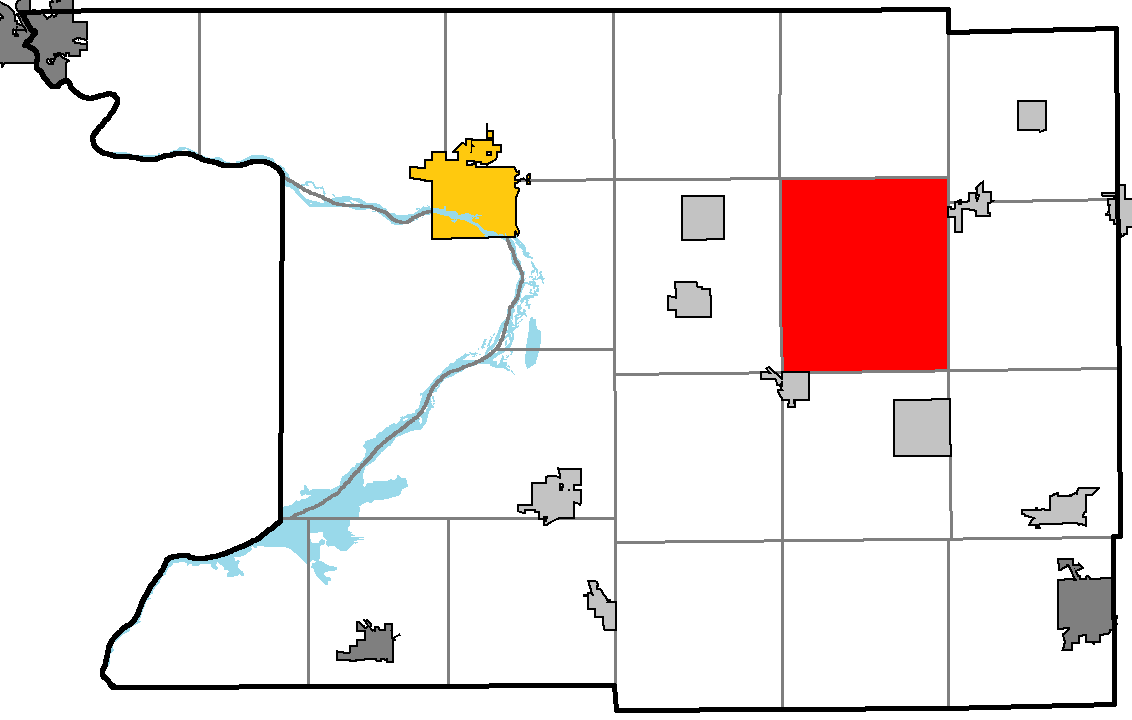
- Location of Springvale, within Columbia County, Wisconsin

- Location of Columbia County, Wisconsin
- Coordinates: 43°30′10″N 89°11′23″W
- Country: United States
- State: Wisconsin
- County: Columbia

Area
  - Total: 41.0 sq mi (106.3 km^{2})
  - Land: 41.0 sq mi (106.2 km^{2})
  - Water: 0.039 sq mi (0.1 km^{2})
- Elevation: 879 ft (268 m)

Population (2020)
  - Total: 539
  - Density: 13.1/sq mi (5.08/km^{2})
- Time zone: UTC-6 (Central (CST))
  - Summer (DST): UTC-5 (CDT)
- FIPS code: 55-76225
- GNIS feature ID: 1584201
- Website: https://tn.springvale.wi.gov/

Springvale is a town in Columbia County, Wisconsin, United States. The population was 539 at the 2020 census.

== Geography ==
According to the United States Census Bureau, the town has a total area of 41 square miles (106.3 km^{2}), of which 41 square miles (106.2 km^{2}) is land and 0.1 square miles (0.1 km^{2}) (0.12%) is water.

== Demographics ==
As of the census of 2000, there were 550 people, 197 households, and 159 families residing in the town. The population density was 13.4 people per square mile (5.2/km^{2}). There were 207 housing units at an average density of 5 per square mile (1.9/km^{2}). The racial makeup of the town was 97.45% White, 0.18% African American, 0.55% Native American, 0.18% Asian, and 1.64% from two or more races. Hispanic or Latino people of any race were 0.18% of the population.

There were 197 households, out of which 37.6% had children under the age of 18 living with them, 74.6% were married couples living together, 3% had a female householder with no husband present, and 18.8% were non-families. 15.7% of all households were made up of individuals, and 5.1% had someone living alone who was 65 years of age or older. The average household size was 2.79 and the average family size was 3.13.

In the town, the population was spread out, with 28.7% under the age of 18, 5.1% from 18 to 24, 28.9% from 25 to 44, 24.9% from 45 to 64, and 12.4% who were 65 years of age or older. The median age was 38 years. For every 100 females, there were 117.4 males. For every 100 females age 18 and over, there were 111.9 males.

The median income for a household in the town was $47,188, and the median income for a family was $50,667. Males had a median income of $29,792 versus $25,208 for females. The per capita income for the town was $19,536. About 1.3% of families and 2.1% of the population were below the poverty line, including none of those under the age of eighteen or sixty-five or over.

== Notable people ==
- Robert B. Sanderson, state Representative and senator; former chair of Springvale town board
- Thomas Sanderson, state Representative
- Byron Whittingham, state Representative
