= Clinton T. Horton =

American politician

Clinton Thompson Horton (1876–1953) was an American lawyer and politician from New York.

== Life ==
Horton was born on October 31, 1876, in Petrolia, Butler County, Pennsylvania. He was the son of Elmer Horton and Christine (Thompson) Horton.

The family moved first to Silver Creek, New York, then to Buffalo. He graduated from Cornell University, B.A. in 1898, and LL.B. in 1899. At Cornell, he became a member of the Delta Chi fraternity. Then he practiced law in Buffalo. On July 2, 1903, he married Madge Marie Bates, and they had two children: Roger Bates Horton (1907–1941) and Virginia Horton (born 1911).

Horton was a member of the New York State Assembly (Erie Co., 2nd D.) in 1912, 1913 and 1914; and was Chairman of the Committee on Insurance in 1914.

He was a member of the New York State Senate (48th D.) in 1915 and 1916; and was Chairman of the Committee on Civil Service.

He was a member of the Erie County Board of Child Welfare from 1918 to 1921; and a justice of the New York Supreme Court (8th D.) from 1922 to 1935. Afterwards he was a Referee for the Supreme Court.

He died on January 25, 1953.

== Sources ==
- Courts and Lawyers of New York (1925; pg. 1263)
- CLINTON T. HORTON in NYT on January 27, 1953 (subscription required)

New York State Assembly
Preceded by Oliver G. La Reau	New York State Assembly; Erie County, 2nd District; 1912–1914	Succeeded by Ross Graves
New York State Senate
Preceded by John F. Malone	New York State Senate; 48th District; 1915–1916	Succeeded by Ross Graves
