= The Dandelion Girl =

- Short story by Robert F. Young
- Country: United States
- Language: English
- Genre: Science fiction

Publication
- Published in: The Saturday Evening Post
- Publication type: Periodical
- Publisher: Curtis Publishing Company
- Media type: Magazine
- Publication date: April 1, 1961

"The Dandelion Girl" is a science fiction short story written by American science fiction author Robert F. Young. The story, roughly 5,600 words, first appeared in The Saturday Evening Post on April 1, 1961. The story was later republished in a Robert F. Young short story collection in 1965 called The Worlds of Robert F Young: Sixteen Stories of Science Fiction and Fantasy. The line "Day before yesterday I saw a rabbit, and yesterday a deer, and today, you." from the story appears six times throughout the text and is the only full line that is repeated. The story involves a middle-aged man named Mark Randolph who meets a girl half his age who claims to be from 240 years into the future.

== Plot ==
"The Dandelion Girl" revolves around a 44-year-old man named Mark Randolph who works as a lawyer in his own, albeit small firm. Mark is married to his wife Anne whom he first met as his new secretary twenty years before the story begins. Mark only manages to get away from work twice a year, and has just started his second vacation in September 1961. Anne, who does not work as his secretary anymore, could not come along due to having to appear at jury duty, and since he could not reschedule the trip, he had to go alone. Thus, Mark starts his vacation in a rural area not far from a small city, which can be viewed from atop a hill overlooking the area. Mark stays in a cabin on the edge of a lake in the middle of a wooded area.

One day early in this two-week vacation, Mark climbs the hill overlooking the surrounding area and finds a 21-year-old girl named Julie Danvers with blue eyes, dandelion-colored hair, and wearing a white dress. She tells him that she is from the year 2201 and that she is able to come back due to her father inventing a time machine. Mark does not believe her, but goes along with her imaginative tale. After talking for a few hours, Julie leaves, telling him that she will be back the following day at the same time. Mark returns the next day to find her there, this time wearing a blue dress. They talk for several hours again and get to know more about each other. Julie tells more about her father, whom she thinks very highly of, and the fact that he is an invalid that she must take care of. Despite breaking laws set by the time police to come back in time, Julie still manages via her father's personal time machine. She also states the Novikov self-consistency principle, two decades before he formulated it. Mark and Julie part once more with plans to meet up again. Mark has quickly fallen in love with Julie, but hates himself due to his marital situation and the fact that he has never even so much as looked at another woman since he married Anne.

The next day, Mark climbs the hill and meets with Julie again, this time in a yellow dress. The two talk more atop the hill, and plan to meet again. However, when Mark returns the following day, Julie is nowhere to be seen. After waiting a while for her, Mark descends the hill disappointed and tries again the next day, only to not find her again. On the third day, she still does not appear, and while he has little hope on the fourth day, he does find her, though this time she is in a black dress and he can see tears in her eyes. It turns out Julie's father had died and she came back once more to tell him that her father's personal time machine is breaking down. Without her father around she cannot repair it, and thinks that she will only be able to travel back in time once more before the machine breaks down completely. She leaves that day after confessing her love to him, and while Mark returns to the hill every day until his vacation runs out, he does not meet her again.

Mark returns home from vacation, and while he tries to hide how Julie has affected him, Mark thinks that Anne knows he has changed. On Sunday afternoons, Mark drives into the country and visits the hilltop, but Julie never comes. On a rainy day in mid-November, Mark is home alone since Anne is out playing bingo. Bored, Mark goes into the attic to find some jigsaw puzzles, where he accidentally knocks his wife's old suitcase off a shelf, which opens the rusted lock. Inside, he finds the same white dress that Julie had worn, and suddenly realizes that his wife Anne is in fact Julie, or perhaps Julianne. She had traveled back to when Mark was in his twenties and applied as his secretary under the assumed name Anne. After realizing this, Mark puts on a raincoat and runs outside to meet Anne getting off the bus from her bingo night. After reaching out to touch her rain-wet cheek, Anne knows it is all right, and the fear she had carried in her eyes for the past twenty years disappears forever. Mark and Anne walk home hand in hand in the rain.

== Critical reception ==
Reviewers have said of it that "All I know is that, though I have read other touching love stories in our genre, this one made a personal impression, a unique connection for me—don't ask why." The science fiction news magazine Locus reported that the short story was voted number eight on a poll conducted by Hayakawa's SF Magazine for all-time greatest non-Japanese science fiction stories.

== Influence ==
"The Dandelion Girl" influenced Yutaka Izubuchi in the production of the Japanese anime series RahXephon. The repeated line "Day before yesterday I saw a rabbit, and yesterday a deer, and today, you." from the story was featured in the visual novel Clannad and its anime series adaptation. The line was also referenced by the video game Portal 2. The book and its story are also the subject of the first chapter of the third volume of The Case Files of Biblia Bookstore, which was adapted into episode 8 of the television series.
