= Alanson Holly =

19th century American politician and newspaperman

Member of the Wisconsin State Assembly from the Columbia 1st district
- In office January 6, 1868 – January 4, 1869
- Preceded by: W. Scott Schermerhorn
- Succeeded by: Andrew Jackson Turner

Personal details
- Born: July 21, 1810 Granville, New York, U.S.
- Died: September 15, 1882 (aged 72) Kilbourn City, Wisconsin, U.S.
- Resting place: Spring Grove Cemetery, Wisconsin Dells, Wisconsin
- Party: Republican
- Occupation: newspaperman

Alanson Holly (July 21, 1810 – September 15, 1882) was an American newspaper editor and Republican politician. He served one term in the Wisconsin State Assembly, representing western Columbia County.

== Biography ==
Born in Granville, New York, Holly taught school and was in the mercantile and newspaper business in Wyoming County, New York. In 1855, Holly settled in Kilbourn City, Wisconsin, Holly started the newspaper the Wisconsin Mirror in 1856. In 1860, Holly shut down the newspaper and moved to Lockport, New York. In 1866, Holly returned to Kilbourn City and restarted the newspaper. In 1868, Holly served in the Wisconsin State Assembly. Holly died in Kilbourn City, Wisconsin.

== Notes ==
Wisconsin State Assembly
Preceded by W. Scott Schermerhorn	Member of the Wisconsin State Assembly from the Columbia 1st district January 6, 1868 – January 4, 1869	Succeeded by Andrew Jackson Turner
