= Knudt Heimdal =

American farmer and politician (1830–1887)

Knudt Olson Heimdal (October 19, 1830 – December 15, 1887) was a farmer and local politician from Deerfield, Wisconsin who served one term as a member of the Wisconsin State Assembly.

== Background ==
Born October 18, 1830, in Norway, he received a public school education before emigrating to Wisconsin with his parents in 1844. He settled first in Christiana before moving in 1846 to Deerfield (both places are in Dane County), where he settled.

== Public office ==
Heimdal was elected town clerk of Deerfield in 1854, 1857, 1858 and 1859; town treasurer in 1856; and chairman of the town board in 1862–65, 1867 and 1869. In 1869, he was the Democratic nominee for the Assembly's 2nd Dane County district (the Towns of Bristol, Burke, Deerfield, Medina, Sun Prairie, Vienna, Westport, Windsor, and York), but lost to former state senator Willard H. Chandler with 690 votes to Chandler's 734. In 1870 he ran again and won, with 858 votes against 751 for Republican Robert B. Sanderson (Chandler was not a candidate).

== Private life ==
Heimdal died December 15, 1887. He is buried in the Deerfield Cemetery. He was married to Sarah A. Adsit; their daughter Sarah G. Heimdal graduated from the University of Wisconsin in 1899.
