= George B. Shaw =

American politician (1854–1894)

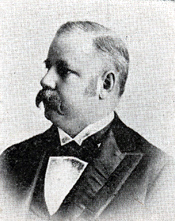

Member of the U.S. House of Representatives from Wisconsin's 7th district
- In office March 4, 1893 – August 27, 1894
- Preceded by: Frank P. Coburn
- Succeeded by: Michael Griffin

Supreme Chancellor of the Knights of Pythias
- In office July 1890 – August 1892

Mayor of Eau Claire, Wisconsin
- In office 1888–1889

Personal details
- Born: George Bullen Shaw; March 12, 1854 Alma, New York, U.S.
- Died: August 27, 1894 (aged 40) Eau Claire, Wisconsin, U.S.
- Resting place: Lake View Cemetery, Eau Claire, Wisconsin, U.S.
- Party: Republican
- Spouse: Josephine M. Bletcher
- Children: 2
- Parent(s): Daniel Shaw; Ann Foster Hutchins
- Education: International Business College
- Profession: Politician, businessman, lumberman
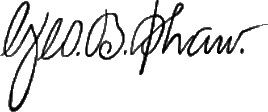
- Signature

George Bullen Shaw (March 12, 1854 – August 27, 1894) was an American politician, businessman, and lumberman who served in the United States House of Representatives from 1893 until his death in 1894, representing the 7th congressional district of Wisconsin as a Republican in the 53rd United States Congress. Shaw previously served as the mayor of Eau Claire, Wisconsin in 1888 and 1889.

== Early life and education ==
Shaw was born in Alma, New York, on March 12, 1854, to Daniel Shaw and Ann Foster Hutchins. He moved to Eau Claire, Wisconsin in 1856 with his father.

Shaw attended public schools in Eau Claire and graduated from the International Business College in Chicago in 1871.

== Career ==
Shaw engaged in his father's lumber manufacturing business, the Daniel Shaw Lumber Company, in 1874, serving in various positions, including secretary.

Shaw served as a member of the common council of Eau Claire from 1876 to 1887. He also served as the mayor of Eau Claire in 1888 and 1889.

Shaw was a delegate to the Republican National Convention in 1884.

In 1892, Shaw was elected as a Republican to represent the 7th congressional district of Wisconsin in the 53rd United States Congress. Shaw's term began on March 4, 1893; he served until his death in office the following year.

Shaw missed 72% of the 325 roll call votes taken from August 1893 to August 1894.

== Personal life and death ==
Shaw was married to Josephine M. Bletcher, with whom he had two children.

Shaw served as Supreme Chancellor of the Knights of Pythias from July 1890 to August 1892.

Shaw died at the age of 40 in Eau Claire, Wisconsin, on August 27, 1894. He was interred in Lake View Cemetery, located in Eau Claire.

== See also ==
- List of members of the United States Congress who died in office (1790–1899)

U.S. House of Representatives
Preceded by Frank P. Coburn	Member of the U.S. House of Representatives from Wisconsin's 7th congressional district March 4, 1893–1894	Succeeded by Michael Griffin
