= Levi W. Barden =

19th century American politician

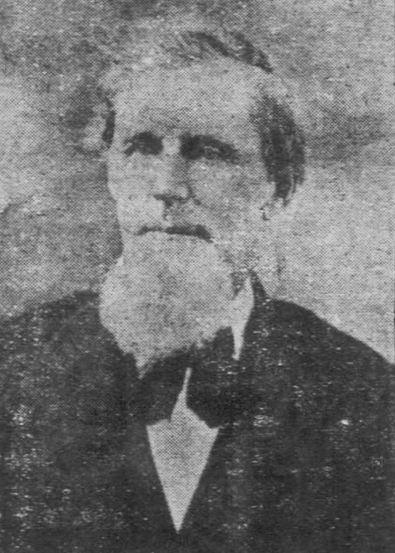

Member of the Wisconsin Senate from the 27th district
- In office January 4, 1875 – January 6, 1879
- Preceded by: Evan O. Jones
- Succeeded by: Charles L. Dering

Member of the Wisconsin State Assembly from the Columbia 1st district
- In office January 2, 1865 – January 1, 1866
- Preceded by: A. J. Turner
- Succeeded by: A. J. Turner

District Attorney of Columbia County, Wisconsin
- In office January 5, 1857 – January 7, 1861
- Preceded by: Luther S. Dixon
- Succeeded by: Israel Holmes

Personal details
- Born: September 3, 1820 Benton, New York, U.S.
- Died: August 31, 1915 (aged 94) Flushing, New York, U.S.
- Cause of death: Silver Lake Cemetery, Portage, Wisconsin
- Party: Republican
- Spouse: Jane R. Corning (m. 1853; died 1893)
- Children: 3
- Education: State and National Law School
- Profession: Lawyer

Levi Witter Barden (September 3, 1820 – August 31, 1915) was an American lawyer, Republican politician, and Wisconsin pioneer. He served four years in the Wisconsin Senate (1875–1879), and one year in the Wisconsin State Assembly (1865), representing Columbia County. Earlier, he served four years as district attorney of Columbia County.

== Biography ==
Barden was born on September 3, 1820, in Benton, New York. He graduated from State and National Law School and moved to Portage, Wisconsin, in the fall of 1852. On November 29, 1853, Barden married Jane R. Corning. They had three children. He died in Flushing, New York, on August 31, 1915, and was buried in Portage.

== Career ==
Barden was a member of the Assembly in 1865. He represented the 27th District from 1875 through 1878. Other positions he held include Portage alderman, district attorney of Columbia County, and justice of the peace. Barden was a Republican.

Wisconsin State Assembly
Preceded by A. J. Turner	Member of the Wisconsin State Assembly from the Columbia 1st district January 2, 1865 – January 1, 1866	Succeeded by A. J. Turner
Wisconsin Senate
Preceded by Evan O. Jones	Member of the Wisconsin Senate from the 27th district January 4, 1875 – January 6, 1879	Succeeded by Charles L. Dering
Legal offices
Preceded by Luther S. Dixon	District Attorney of Columbia County, Wisconsin; January 5, 1857 – January 7, 1861	Succeeded by Israel Holmes
