= Harvey W. Emery =

19th century American politician

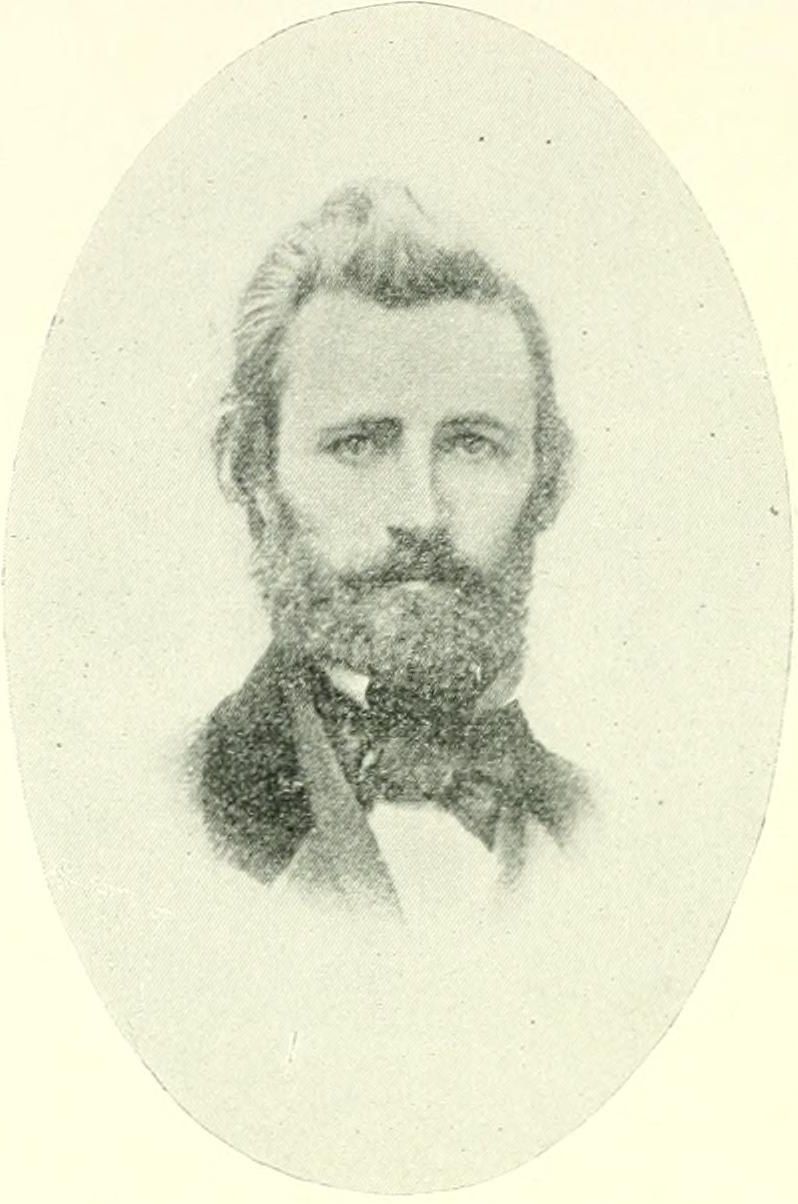
- Portrait from Norwich University, 1819–1911

Member of the Wisconsin State Assembly from the Columbia 1st district
- In office January 7, 1861 – May 1861
- Preceded by: Henry B. Munn
- Succeeded by: Jonathan Bowman

Personal details
- Born: November 8, 1827 Lisbon, New Hampshire, U.S.
- Died: October 13, 1862 (aged 34) Lisbon, New Hampshire, U.S.
- Cause of death: Diarrhea
- Resting place: Grove Hill Cemetery, Lisbon, New Hampshire
- Party: Republican
- Spouse: Mary Jane Dow (m. 1853–1862)
- Children: Evelyn (Jones); Harriet May (Breneman)
- Education: Norwich University
- Profession: lawyer

Military service
- Allegiance: United States
- Branch/service: United States Volunteers; Union Army
- Years of service: 1861–1862
- Rank: Lt. Colonel, USV
- Unit: 5th Reg. Wis. Vol. Infantry
- Battles/wars: American Civil War: Peninsula campaign; Second Battle of Bull Run; Battle of Antietam

Harvey Webster Emery (November 8, 1827 – October 13, 1862) was an American lawyer, Republican politician, and Wisconsin pioneer. He was a member of the Wisconsin State Assembly, representing Columbia County for one term, and then served as a Union Army officer in the American Civil War. He died of disease during the second year of the war.

== Biography ==
Harvey W. Emery was born in Lisbon, New Hampshire, in November 1827. He was educated there and attended the Newbury Seminary, in Newbury, Vermont, to prepare for college. He then attended Norwich University, where he graduated with a bachelor's degree in 1852.

After graduating, he taught school and served as principal at the Danville, Vermont, academy, and then the Morgantown, Virginia, female seminary. While in Morgantown, he read law in the office of Waitman T. Willey and was admitted to the bar in 1855. Later that year, he moved to Portage, Wisconsin, and established a legal practice in partnership with Edgar P. Hill.

In 1860, he was elected to the Wisconsin State Assembly from Columbia County's 1st Assembly district, running on the Republican Party ticket.

The outbreak of the American Civil War occurred just after the adjournment of the 1861 session of the Legislature, and Emery immediately volunteered for service with the Union Army. He was commissioned lieutenant colonel of the 5th Wisconsin Infantry Regiment and mustered into service July 13, 1861. With the 5th Wisconsin Infantry, he participated in the Peninsula campaign and distinguished himself at the Battle of Williamsburg. In the Summer of 1862, he fell ill and was confined to a hospital. He never fully recovered from his disease, but returned to the regiment in August and participated in the Second Battle of Bull Run and the Battle of Antietam. In September, he was so racked with disease, he was taken back to his parents' home in Lisbon, New Hampshire, where he died on October 13, 1862.

== Personal life and family ==
Emery married Mary Jane Dow on August 23, 1853. She was also a graduate of Newbury Seminary. They had two daughters together.

Wisconsin State Assembly
Preceded by Henry B. Munn	Member of the Wisconsin State Assembly from the Columbia 1st district January 7, 1861 – May 1861	Succeeded by Jonathan Bowman
