= Silver Creek, New York =

Silver Creek, New York Seneca: Tgaenödë́hda:'
- Village
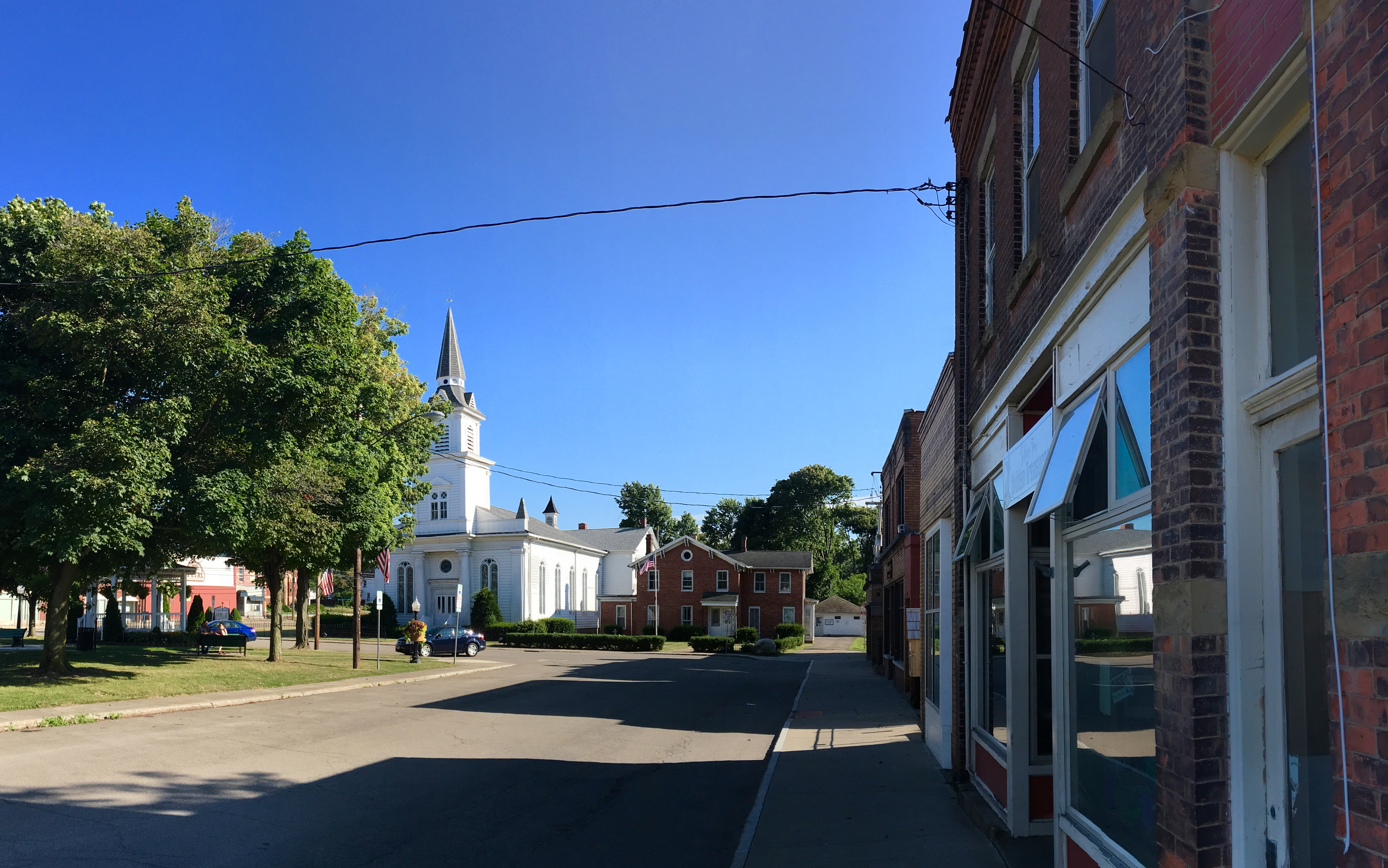
- Park Place

- Location within the state of New York
- Coordinates: 42°32′39″N 79°10′2″W
- Country: United States
- State: New York
- County: Chautauqua
- Town: Hanover

Area
  - Total: 1.15 sq mi (2.98 km^{2})
  - Land: 1.15 sq mi (2.98 km^{2})
  - Water: 0.0039 sq mi (0.01 km^{2})
- Elevation: 587 ft (179 m)

Population (2020)
  - Total: 2,617
  - Density: 2,276.7/sq mi (879.02/km^{2})
- Time zone: UTC-5 (Eastern (EST))
  - Summer (DST): UTC-4 (EDT)
- ZIP code: 14136
- Area code: 716
- FIPS code: 36-67411
- GNIS feature ID: 0970603
- Website: silvercreekny.gov

Silver Creek (Seneca: Tgaenödë́hda:') is a village in the town of Hanover in Chautauqua County, New York, United States. As of the 2020 census, the village had a population of 2,617. Silver Creek is named after a small creek which runs through the village. It is on the shore of Lake Erie.

== History ==
Bird's-eye view of Silver Creek in 1892

The community was first settled circa 1803, and the first school house was erected in approximately 1823. In 1822 a well-known black walnut tree, measuring about 10 feet (3.0 m) in diameter, was blown over in a storm. The village of Silver Creek was incorporated in 1848. Silver Creek was an important port on Lake Erie until railroads reduced shipping. The village is home to a skew arch railroad bridge built in 1869 over Jackson Street. On September 14, 1886, an excursion train collided head-on with a freight train on the Nickel Plate Railroad about a mile east of the village. The collision killed at least 16 people.

== Geography ==
Railroad bridges in Silver Creek, photographed in 2015

Silver Creek is located at 42°32'39" north, 79°10'2" west (42.544083, -79.167088). According to the United States Census Bureau, the village has a total area of 1.2 square miles (3.0 km^{2}); all land. Silver Creek is part of the Lake Erie Basin. The two creeks in the village, Silver Creek and Walnut Creek, drain into the lake. Silver Creek is at the junction of New York State Route 5 (Central Avenue) and US Route 20 (Main Street), north of New York State Thruway (Interstate 90) Exit 58.

Silver Creek is on the New York-to-Chicago main line of CSX Transportation and the New York-Buffalo-Chicago main line of the Norfolk Southern Railway. The CSXT line through Silver Creek was formerly operated by the Consolidated Rail Corporation (Conrail), which succeeded the Penn Central (which succeeded the New York Central Railroad, which succeeded the Lake Shore and Michigan Southern Railway, which succeeded the Lake Shore Railroad, which succeeded the Buffalo & Erie Railway, the original line). The Norfolk Southern line through Silver Creek was formerly operated by the Norfolk and Western Railway, successor to the New York, Chicago and St. Louis Railroad (Nickel Plate Road [NKP]), the original line.

The Penn Central's (formerly the Pennsylvania Railroad, or PRR) Buffalo-Corry (PA)-Pittsburgh line formerly operated through Silver Creek. The single-track lines of the NKP and PRR were jointly operated to form a double-track line which was used by the trains of both railroads. The former PRR line was abandoned around 1976 by order of the Interstate Commerce Commission in favor of highway transportation. From approximately 1907 to 1933 Silver Creek was on the Buffalo-to-Erie main line of the Buffalo & Erie Railway (successor to the Buffalo & Lake Erie Traction Company), a high-speed electric interurban railway. It was abandoned by order of the New York Public Service Commission to promote highway transportation.

=== Climate ===
Climate data for Silver Creek
Month	Jan	Feb	Mar	Apr	May	Jun	Jul	Aug	Sep	Oct	Nov	Dec	Year
Record high °F (°C)	73 (23)	73 (23)	82 (28)	91 (33)	90 (32)	95 (35)	98 (37)	98 (37)	97 (36)	91 (33)	82 (28)	74 (23)	98 (37)
Mean daily maximum °F (°C)	32 (0)	35 (2)	44 (7)	55 (13)	67 (19)	76 (24)	80 (27)	78 (26)	72 (22)	61 (16)	49 (9)	37 (3)	57 (14)
Mean daily minimum °F (°C)	19 (−7)	19 (−7)	27 (−3)	37 (3)	48 (9)	57 (14)	62 (17)	61 (16)	54 (12)	44 (7)	35 (2)	25 (−4)	41 (5)
Record low °F (°C)	−17 (−27)	−26 (−32)	−10 (−23)	10 (−12)	27 (−3)	35 (2)	43 (6)	37 (3)	32 (0)	21 (−6)	7 (−14)	−9 (−23)	−26 (−32)
Average precipitation inches (mm)	2.57 (65)	2.12 (54)	2.76 (70)	3.30 (84)	3.32 (84)	3.94 (100)	3.78 (96)	3.86 (98)	4.84 (123)	4.04 (103)	4.16 (106)	3.39 (86)	42.08 (1,069)

== Demographics ==
Historical population
Census	Pop.	Note	%±
1860	661		—
1870	666		0.8%
1880	1,036		55.6%
1890	1,678		62.0%
1900	1,944		15.9%
1910	2,512		29.2%
1920	3,260		29.8%
1930	3,160		−3.1%
1940	3,067		−2.9%
1950	3,068		0.0%
1960	3,310		7.9%
1970	3,182		−3.9%
1980	3,088		−3.0%
1990	2,927		−5.2%
2000	2,896		−1.1%
2010	2,656		−8.3%
2020	2,617		−1.5%
2021 (est.)	2,613	▼	−0.2%
U.S. Decennial Census

As of the 2010 census, there were 2,656 people, 1,048 households and 718 families residing in the village. The population density was 2,213.3 inhabitants per square mile (854.6/km^{2}). There were 1,174 housing units, with an average density of 978.3 per square mile (377.7/km^{2}). The racial makeup of the village was 94.2 percent White, 0.9 percent African American, 1.8 percent Native American, 0.5 percent Asian, 0.7 percent from other races, and 1.8 percent from two or more races. 2.8 percent of the population were Hispanic or Latino of any race.

31.8 percent of households had children under the age of 18 living with them, 48.8 percent were married couples living together, 15 percent had a female householder with no husband present, and 31.5 percent were non-families. 26.4 percent of all households were made up of individuals, and 11 percent had someone living alone who was 65 years of age or older. The average household size was 2.51 and the average family size was 2.98.

In the village, the population was spread out, with 28 percent under the age of 20, 7 percent from 20 to 24, 25.5 percent from 25 to 44, 26.7 percent from 45 to 64, and 12.9 percent who were 65 years of age or older. The median age was 37.7 years. For every 100 females, there were 95.9 males. For every 100 females age 18 and over, there were 90.6 males.

The median 2000 income for a household in the village was $32,446, and the median income for a family was $38,617. Males had a median income of $33,889 versus $19,464 for females. The per capita income for the village was $15,904. 12.9% of the population and 9.8% of families were below the poverty line. Out of the total population, 22.8% of those under the age of 18 and 1.9% of those 65 and older were living below the poverty line.

== Health care and law enforcement ==
Silver Creek is served by Brooks Memorial Hospital in Dunkirk, NY.

Trauma cases are treated at the Erie County Medical Center in Buffalo and UPMC Hamot in Erie, Pennsylvania. On August 10, 2009, flash flooding affected Silver Creek, Sunset Bay and Gowanda. As a result of the flood, the New York State Department of Health closed Tri-County Memorial Hospital. The Village of Silver Creek dissolved the Police Department and contracted with the Chautauqua County Sheriff's Office for patrols along with assistance from the New York State Police when needed. In January-February 2020 Lakeshore Hospital in Hanover closed for good, leaving Brooks Memorial in Dunkirk as the closest hospital. Most are taken to hospitals in Buffalo, or Erie when the Brooks emergency room is full.

Fire protection in Silver Creek is provided by the Bay Creek Fire District, comprising the Silver Creek and Sunset Bay volunteer fire companies. The village also has the Silver Creek Emergency Squad. During the August 10, 2009, flooding, the emergency-squad building, the village fire hall and its vehicles sustained extensive damage; the public works department on North Main Street was destroyed and has since moved to a new building in the former Bentges distributing plant on Routes 5 and 20 in the town of Hanover. Several homes along Walnut Creek were badly damaged or destroyed, and the Silver Village Trailer Park was leveled by flooding from Silver Creek. Some village streets were badly damaged or washed away by the flood waters. A funeral home, church and school were also badly damaged.

Both Mercy Flight, a nonprofit medivac service based in Buffalo and LifeStar, a medivac service affiliated with UPMC Hamot in Erie, serve the Silver Creek area.

== Grape Festival ==
Every third weekend in September Silver Creek hosts a Festival of Grapes to honor Concord grapes, an important agricultural product. The festival began in 1968 and features a parade, live music, a midway, a wine tent, children's and adults' activities and a grape stomping.

In 2008, the Silver Creek Grape Festival was featured on the nationally televised Good Morning America. Diane Sawyer, Robin Roberts, Sam Champion and Chris Cuomo visited a farm to stomp grapes on their trip across America; taken during the 2008 election, they visited 50 states in 50 days learning about the country. Diane Sawyer called it "the first and maybe last annual GMA grape stomping contest in honor of Lucille Ball, who was born in the region". The four participated in a grape-stomping competition.

The festival concludes every year with the grand parade which features the festival of grapes royalty, political figures, high school marching bands from regional high schools, fire apparatus from Silver Creek, Sunset Bay, Forestville, Hanover Center, Irving, Sheridan, Lake Erie Beach, Angola, and Fredonia. Some years the local Shriners club from Gowanda and the Chautauqua County Sheriff's Office mounted unit also participate. Several youth organizations march in the parade alongside the local fire departments and veterans.

== School ==
Silver Creek Union School and Academy in 1881

In Silver Creek all three schools (elementary, middle and high school) are physically interconnected, to facilitate the transition to the next stage of learning. The elementary school is attached to the middle school which in turn is attached to the high school. The Silver Creek Central School District maintains its own transportation department, rather than contracting for school-bus service. Its bus drivers have come from all walks of life; many are retirees. The transportation director is responsible for the district's 30 buses.

There are separate runs for pre-kindergarten to fifth-grade, and sixth- to twelfth-grade students. Four buses are used on a later run for vocational students returning from the LoGuidice Educational Center in Fredonia and students staying late for any reason. The buses are used for school-sponsored sporting events held at other schools, school-sponsored field trips and the annual Class Night party for the graduating class. In the event of a snow day or an unanticipated need for early dismissal, all local television and radio stations are contacted.

There is a SADD (Students Against Destructive Decisions) chapter at the high school, counseling students against destructive decisions. It has sponsored movie nights for elementary-school students with movies, food and activities. Once every few years Forestville and/or Silver Creek try to hold a mock DWI Drill just before prom weekend in the spring.

=== Athletics ===
The school colors are black and old gold, and its mascot is a black knight. Sports offered are cross-country for boys and girls, football and soccer for boys and soccer, swimming and volleyball for girls. On November 8, 2008, the Silver Creek High School football team lost 21–0 to Southwestern High School in the Section VI Class C championship game at Ralph Wilson Stadium in Orchard Park.

== Notable people ==
- Doc Alexander, NFL football player and coach
- James V. Bennett, former director of the Federal Bureau of Prisons
- Samuel S. Brannan, Wisconsin politician
- George Carter; played for St. Bonaventure University and later in the 1971 ABA All-Star Game. Went to become an NBA forward
- Ezra Convis, politician
- Albert G. Dow, former New York State Senator
- Howard Ehmke, former MLB pitcher
- Clinton T. Horton, former New York State Senator
- Alice Lee Jemison, journalist and political activist
- Cindy Miller, golfer
- George Mohart, former Major League Baseball pitcher
- Robert F. Young, science-fiction writer
- Elisha Ward, lawyer and politician
