= Llanelltyd =

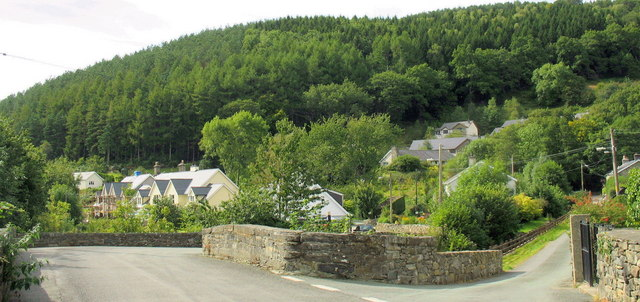
- Pont Wnin and the centre of the village

- Location within Gwynedd
- Area: 43.09 km^{2} (16.64 sq mi)
- Population: 514 (2011)
  - Density: 12/km^{2} (31/sq mi)
- OS grid reference: SH714194
- Community: Llanelltyd
- Principal area: Gwynedd
- Country: Wales
- Sovereign state: United Kingdom
- Post town: DOLGELLAU
- Postcode district: LL40
- Dialling code: 01341
- Police: North Wales
- Fire: North Wales
- Ambulance: Welsh
- UK Parliament: Dwyfor Meirionnydd
- Senedd Cymru – Welsh Parliament: Dwyfor Meirionnydd
- List of places UK Wales Gwynedd 52.757°N 3.905°W Map of the community

Llanelltyd is a small village and community in Gwynedd, to the northwest of Dolgellau. The community population taken at the 2011 census was 514, 57.4% of which speak Welsh.

It is home to the 12th-century Cymer Abbey, a grade I listed building. St Illtyd's church, one of the oldest parish churches in Wales, is a grade II* listed building.

The small settlement of Bontddu is in the community. The village itself has a population of around 300.

== Notable people born in Llanelltyd ==
- William Owen (1825–1894), Wisconsin State Assemblyman
