= Andrew Jackson Turner =

American politician

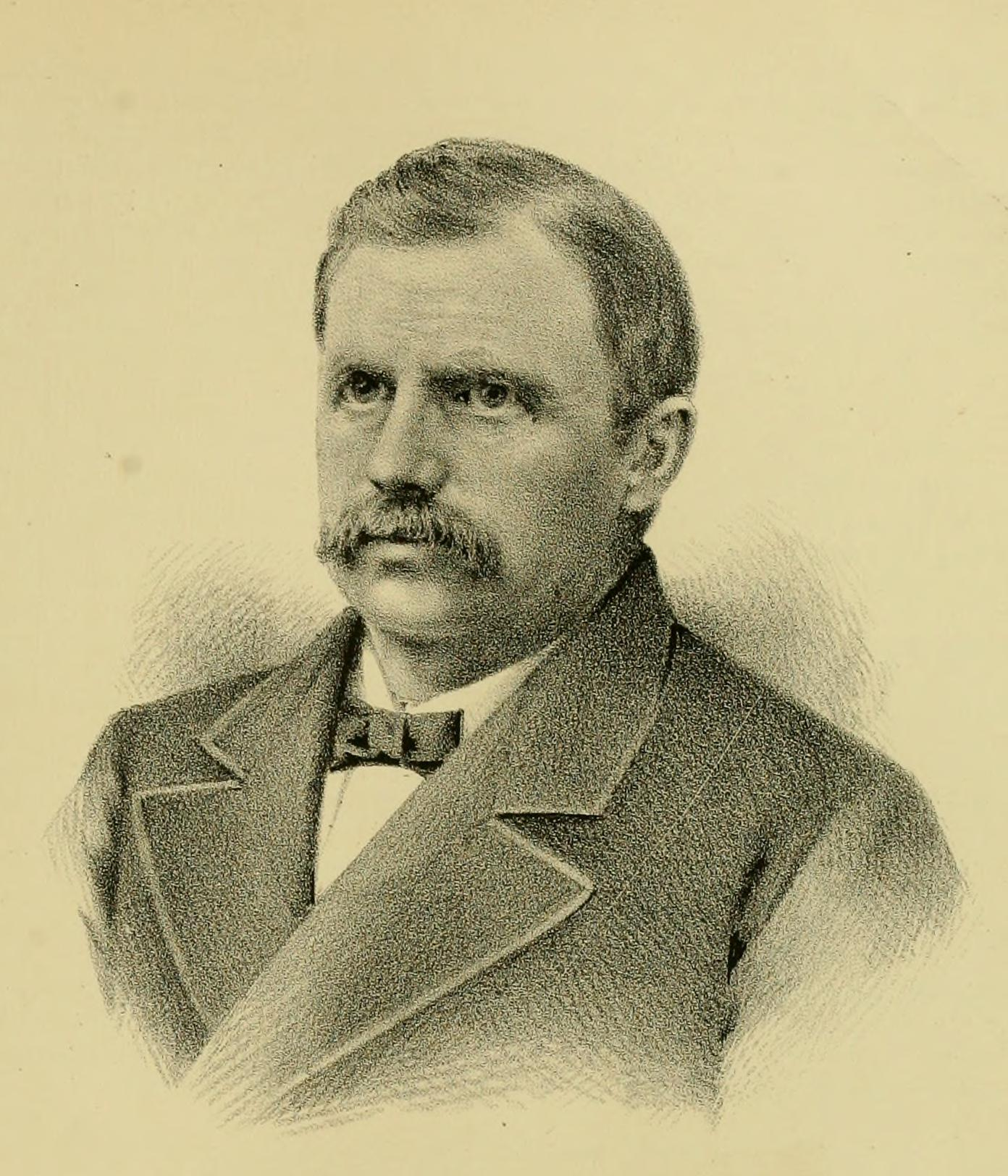

2nd Wisconsin Railroad Commissioner
- In office February 15, 1878 – February 15, 1882
- Appointed by: William E. Smith
- Preceded by: Dana C. Lamb
- Succeeded by: Nils P. Haugen

Chief Clerk of the Wisconsin Senate
- In office January 3, 1876 – February 7, 1878
- Preceded by: Fred A. Dennett
- Succeeded by: Charles E. Bross

17th Mayor of Portage, Wisconsin
- In office April 1881 – April 1884
- Preceded by: Josiah D. Arnold
- Succeeded by: James B. Taylor

Member of the Wisconsin State Assembly from the Columbia 1st district
- In office January 4, 1869 – January 3, 1870
- Preceded by: Alanson Holly
- Succeeded by: Jonas Narracong
- In office January 1, 1866 – January 7, 1867
- Preceded by: Levi W. Barden
- Succeeded by: W. Scott Schermerhorn
- In office January 5, 1863 – January 2, 1865
- Preceded by: Jonathan Bowman
- Succeeded by: Levi W. Barden

Personal details
- Born: September 24, 1832 Schuyler Falls, New York, U.S.
- Died: June 10, 1905 (aged 72) Portage, Wisconsin, U.S.
- Resting place: Silver Lake Cemetery, Portage, Wisconsin
- Party: Republican
- Spouse: Mary Olivia Hanford (m. 1860–1905)
- Children: Frederick Jackson Turner
- Occupation: Journalist, politician, civic leader, business operator
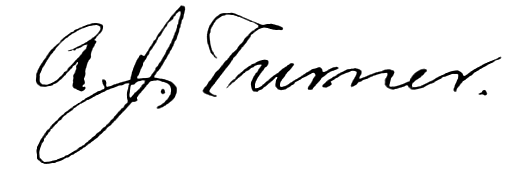
- Signature

Andrew Jackson Turner (September 24, 1832 – June 10, 1905) was an American politician, newspaper editor, and businessman. He served 4 years in the Wisconsin State Assembly, representing western Columbia County, and was the 2nd Wisconsin Railroad Commissioner. He also served as the 17th mayor of Portage, Wisconsin (1881–1884), and was chief clerk of the Wisconsin Senate for the 1876 and 1877 terms. In contemporaneous documents, his name was almost always abbreviated as A. J. Turner. He also sometimes went by the nickname "Jack Turner".

== Biography ==
Born in Schuyler Falls, New York, he moved to Grand Rapids, Michigan, in 1855 and then settled in Portage, Wisconsin, in 1857. He was co-editor of the Portage City Record, which later merged with the Portage Wisconsin State Register. Turner served in the Wisconsin State Assembly as a Republican from 1863 to 1864, and again from 1866 to 1869. He was elected chief clerk of the Wisconsin State Senate during the 1876, 1877, and 1878 terms. He also served as mayor of Portage, Wisconsin, and was the Wisconsin Railroad Commissioner from 1878 to 1882. He wrote pamphlets and articles about the history of Portage and the Republican Party. His son was the educator Frederick Jackson Turner. Turner died in Portage, Wisconsin.

== Published works ==
- Turner, A. J., ed. (1872). The Legislative Manual of the State of Wisconsin (Report). State of Wisconsin.
- Turner, A. J., ed. (1873). The Legislative Manual of the State of Wisconsin (Report). State of Wisconsin.
- Turner, A. J., ed. (1874). The Legislative Manual of the State of Wisconsin (Report). State of Wisconsin.

Wisconsin State Assembly
Preceded by Jonathan Bowman	Member of the Wisconsin State Assembly from the Columbia 1st district January 5, 1863 – January 2, 1865	Succeeded by Levi W. Barden
Preceded by Levi W. Barden	Member of the Wisconsin State Assembly from the Columbia 1st district January 1, 1866 – January 7, 1867	Succeeded by W. Scott Schermerhorn
Preceded by Alanson Holly	Member of the Wisconsin State Assembly from the Columbia 1st district January 4, 1869 – January 3, 1870	Succeeded by Jonas Narracong
Wisconsin Senate
Preceded by Fred A. Dennett	Chief Clerk of the Wisconsin Senate; January 3, 1876 – February 7, 1878	Succeeded by Charles E. Bross
Political offices
Preceded by Josiah D. Arnold	Mayor of Portage, Wisconsin; April 1881 – April 1884	Succeeded by James B. Taylor
Government offices
Preceded by Dana C. Lamb	Wisconsin Railroad Commissioner; February 15, 1878 – February 15, 1882	Succeeded by Nils P. Haugen
