= Byron Whittingham =

American politician and businessman

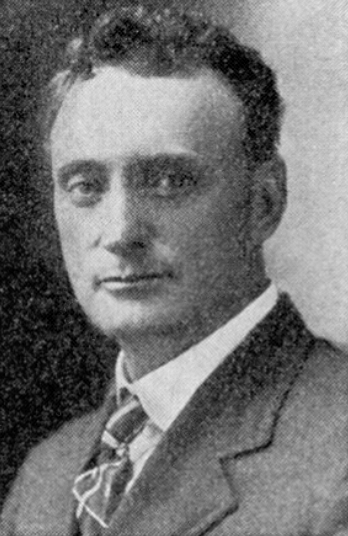

Member of the Wisconsin State Assembly
- In office 1917–1921

Personal details
- Born: Byron Sawyer Whittingham; April 16, 1870 Springvale, Wisconsin, US
- Died: February 5, 1942 (aged 71) Arpin, Wisconsin, US
- Party: Republican
- Spouse: Marguerite Purves (m. 1891)
- Occupation: Businessman, politician

Byron Sawyer Whittingham (April 16, 1870 – February 5, 1942) was an American politician and businessman.

== Biography ==
Whittingham was born in the town of Springvale, Columbia County, Wisconsin. He married Marguerite Purves (1874–1951) in 1891. Whittingham was involved in the paint business in Pardeeville, Wisconsin, where he was the street commissioner and assessor. Whittingham was then in the paint contracting business in South Milwaukee, Wisconsin from 1900 to 1904. In 1904, Whittingham moved to Arpin, Wisconsin, where he started a general mercantile store. He served as town clerk and postmaster of Arpin. Whittingham also served on the school board and was a Republican. In 1917, Wittingham was elected to the Wisconsin State Assembly, where he served from 1917 to 1921. Whittingham died of pneumonia at his home in Arpin, Wisconsin.
