= Jonathan Bowman =

American lawyer and politician (1828–1895)

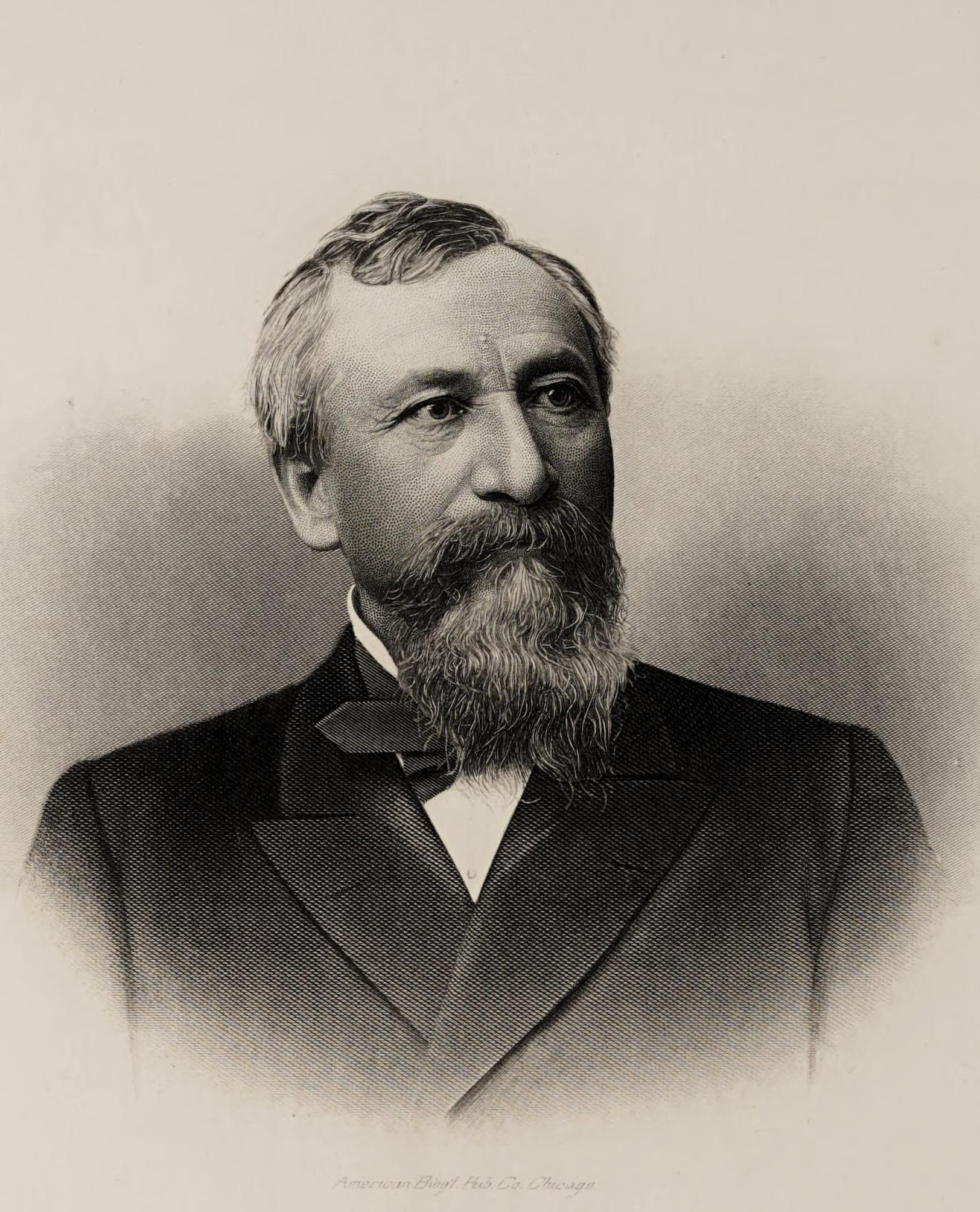

Member of the Wisconsin Senate from the 25th district
- In office January 1, 1863 – January 1, 1867
- Preceded by: Gerry Whiting Hazelton
- Succeeded by: Robert B. Sanderson

Member of the Wisconsin State Assembly from the Columbia 1st district
- In office January 1, 1874 – January 1, 1875
- Preceded by: Samuel S. Brannan
- Succeeded by: Marcus Barden
- In office January 1, 1862 – January 1, 1863
- Preceded by: Harvey W. Emery
- Succeeded by: A. J. Turner

Personal details
- Born: May 16, 1828 Charleston, New York, U.S.
- Died: July 16, 1895 (aged 69) Wisconsin Dells, Wisconsin, U.S.
- Resting place: Spring Grove Cemetery, Wisconsin Dells
- Party: Republican; National Union (1864)
- Spouses: Hannah J. Davis; (m. 1856)
- Children: Ella Davis Bowman; Abram Davis Bowman; Asa Bowman; Jennie Bowman; Emma Bowman
- Parents: Asa Bowman (father); Ruth (Rider) Bowman (mother)
- Occupation: lawyer, judge

Jonathan Bowman (May 16, 1828 – July 16, 1895) was an American lawyer, businessman, Republican politician, and Wisconsin pioneer. He served four years in the Wisconsin Senate (1863–1867) and two years in the state Assembly (1862, 1874), representing Columbia County, Wisconsin.

== Biography ==
Born in Charleston, New York, his father was a farmer who served in the New York State Legislature. Bowman was educated at the Canajoharie academy and graduated from the State and National Law School in Ballston Spa, New York in 1850.

He then moved to Delton, Wisconsin, in 1851, where he practiced law and was invested in several businesses. His business interests led him, in 1852, to take part in laying out the village of Newport, Wisconsin—where he resided until 1862. Newport was chosen as the site of the first dam across the Wisconsin River, and Bowman was one of the incorporators of the project. He worked with Joseph Bailey, who later became famous in the American Civil War for his bridge across the Red River. Despite his efforts, Newport lost out on a railroad bridge to neighboring Kilbourn City. Bowman moved to Kilbourn City (now Wisconsin Dells) in 1862 and resided there for the rest of his life.

Bowman was an alternate delegate from Wisconsin to the 1860 Republican National Convention, which nominated Abraham Lincoln. For a time, Bowman was very disappointed that the convention did not nominate William H. Seward, but he later became a great admirer of Lincoln.

In 1861, Bowman was elected to the 1862 session of the Wisconsin State Assembly as a Republican. The next year he was elected to the Wisconsin State Senate. He was re-elected in 1864, running on the National Union Party ticket. Also in 1864, Bowman was chosen as one of Wisconsin's presidential electors and served as chairman of the electoral college that year. He served one final term in the Assembly in 1875. In his legislative career, he worked to get approval for a dam on the Wisconsin River at Kilbourn City to improve the industry of the area with water power. After a great deal of resistance from loggers upstream, he was eventually able to get the dam approved and constructed.

After leaving the legislature, he served as an attorney for the Chicago, Milwaukee & St. Paul Railway Company in a dispute with the city of La Crosse, Wisconsin, over the location of a railroad bridge over the Mississippi River. The dispute was adjudicated in the Wisconsin Legislature, and Bowman ultimately was successful on behalf of the Railroad. He then went on to become a member of the board of directors of the railroad from 1875 to 1879.

He purchased a controlling interest in the Bank of Kilbourn in 1868 and remained president of the bank until his death.

== Personal life and family ==
Bowman married Hannah J. Davis, of Montgomery County, New York, in 1856. They had five children, though only three—Abram, Jennie, and Emma—survived him.

Bowman died from inflammation of the bowels in Kilbourn City, Wisconsin.

Wisconsin State Assembly
Preceded by Harvey W. Emery	Member of the Wisconsin State Assembly from the Columbia 1st district January 1, 1862 – January 1, 1863	Succeeded by A. J. Turner
Preceded by Samuel S. Brannan	Member of the Wisconsin State Assembly from the Columbia 1st district January 1, 1874 – January 1, 1875	Succeeded by Marcus Barden
Wisconsin Senate
Preceded by Gerry Whiting Hazelton	Member of the Wisconsin Senate from the 25th district January 1, 1863 – January 1, 1867	Succeeded by Robert B. Sanderson
