= Arlington, Wisconsin =

- Village
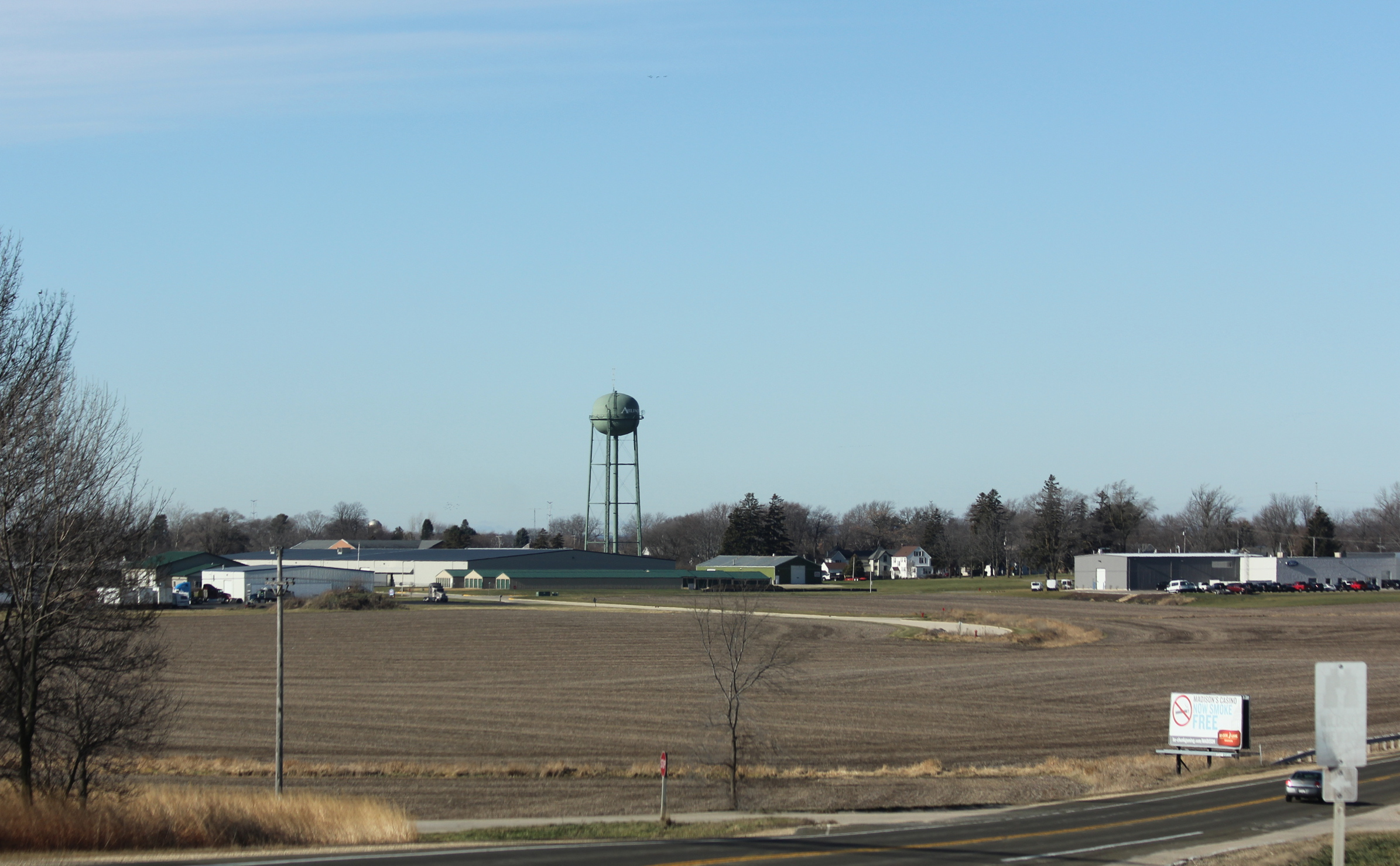
- Panorama of Arlington

- Location of Arlington in Columbia County, Wisconsin.
- Coordinates: 43°20′43″N 89°24′45″W
- Country: United States
- State: Wisconsin
- County: Columbia

Government
  - Village President: Adam Buss

Area
  - Total: 1.04 sq mi (2.69 km^{2})
  - Land: 1.04 sq mi (2.69 km^{2})
  - Water: 0 sq mi (0.00 km^{2})
- Elevation: 1,073 ft (327 m)

Population (2020)
  - Total: 844
  - Density: 813/sq mi (314/km^{2})
- Time zone: UTC-6 (Central (CST))
  - Summer (DST): UTC-5 (CDT)
- FIPS code: 55-02825
- GNIS feature ID: 1582713

Arlington is a village in Columbia County, Wisconsin, United States. The population was 844 at the 2020 census. The village is located within the Town of Arlington. It is part of the Madison Metropolitan Statistical Area.

== History ==
Arlington was originally settled in 1838. The village was platted in 1871 by David Bullen and Mrs. Sarah Pierce, who then owned all the land comprising the current village. The first building in the village was constructed by David Bullen's son, Winslow Bullen, in the summer of 1871.

== Geography ==
Arlington is located at 43°20′19″N 89°22′36″W (43.338506, -89.376695).

According to the United States Census Bureau, the village has a total area of 1.01 square miles (2.62 km^{2}), all land.

== Climate ==
According to the Köppen Climate Classification system, Arlington has a warm-summer humid continental climate, abbreviated "Dfb" on climate maps. The hottest temperature recorded in Arlington was 103 °F (39.4 °C) on July 5–7, 2012, while the coldest temperature recorded was −36 °F (−37.8 °C) on January 18, 1994.

Climate data for Arlington, Wisconsin, 1991–2020 normals, extremes 1962–present
| Month | Jan | Feb | Mar | Apr | May | Jun | Jul | Aug | Sep | Oct | Nov | Dec | Year |
|---|---|---|---|---|---|---|---|---|---|---|---|---|---|
| Record high °F (°C) | 58 (14) | 70 (21) | 83 (28) | 90 (32) | 96 (36) | 100 (38) | 103 (39) | 102 (39) | 96 (36) | 90 (32) | 75 (24) | 67 (19) | 103 (39) |
| Mean maximum °F (°C) | 45.0 (7.2) | 50.0 (10.0) | 65.3 (18.5) | 77.8 (25.4) | 85.4 (29.7) | 90.6 (32.6) | 91.9 (33.3) | 90.3 (32.4) | 87.5 (30.8) | 79.9 (26.6) | 63.6 (17.6) | 49.5 (9.7) | 93.8 (34.3) |
| Mean daily maximum °F (°C) | 26.4 (−3.1) | 30.7 (−0.7) | 42.8 (6.0) | 56.6 (13.7) | 69.0 (20.6) | 78.7 (25.9) | 82.2 (27.9) | 80.2 (26.8) | 73.4 (23.0) | 60.4 (15.8) | 44.4 (6.9) | 31.9 (−0.1) | 56.4 (13.6) |
| Daily mean °F (°C) | 17.6 (−8.0) | 21.3 (−5.9) | 33.0 (0.6) | 45.4 (7.4) | 57.5 (14.2) | 67.5 (19.7) | 71.0 (21.7) | 69.0 (20.6) | 61.4 (16.3) | 49.1 (9.5) | 35.4 (1.9) | 23.8 (−4.6) | 46.0 (7.8) |
| Mean daily minimum °F (°C) | 8.7 (−12.9) | 12.0 (−11.1) | 23.1 (−4.9) | 34.2 (1.2) | 45.9 (7.7) | 56.2 (13.4) | 59.8 (15.4) | 57.8 (14.3) | 49.4 (9.7) | 37.8 (3.2) | 26.4 (−3.1) | 15.7 (−9.1) | 35.6 (2.0) |
| Mean minimum °F (°C) | −13.2 (−25.1) | −8.9 (−22.7) | 1.4 (−17.0) | 19.8 (−6.8) | 30.5 (−0.8) | 41.9 (5.5) | 47.6 (8.7) | 46.1 (7.8) | 33.7 (0.9) | 23.3 (−4.8) | 9.3 (−12.6) | −6.1 (−21.2) | −17.1 (−27.3) |
| Record low °F (°C) | −36 (−38) | −30 (−34) | −16 (−27) | 7 (−14) | 19 (−7) | 34 (1) | 38 (3) | 34 (1) | 25 (−4) | 14 (−10) | −9 (−23) | −26 (−32) | −36 (−38) |
| Average precipitation inches (mm) | 1.24 (31) | 1.40 (36) | 1.98 (50) | 3.74 (95) | 4.24 (108) | 5.14 (131) | 4.17 (106) | 3.80 (97) | 3.34 (85) | 2.78 (71) | 2.23 (57) | 1.45 (37) | 35.51 (904) |
| Average snowfall inches (cm) | 10.7 (27) | 11.2 (28) | 5.3 (13) | 1.9 (4.8) | 0.1 (0.25) | 0.0 (0.0) | 0.0 (0.0) | 0.0 (0.0) | 0.0 (0.0) | 0.3 (0.76) | 2.4 (6.1) | 10.7 (27) | 42.6 (106.91) |
| Average extreme snow depth inches (cm) | 10.7 (27) | 10.3 (26) | 6.5 (17) | 1.1 (2.8) | 0.0 (0.0) | 0.0 (0.0) | 0.0 (0.0) | 0.0 (0.0) | 0.0 (0.0) | 0.2 (0.51) | 1.9 (4.8) | 8.0 (20) | 15.2 (39) |
| Average precipitation days (≥ 0.01 in) | 7.3 | 6.7 | 6.8 | 10.2 | 11.2 | 11.3 | 9.4 | 8.8 | 9.1 | 8.4 | 7.6 | 7.7 | 104.5 |
| Average snowy days (≥ 0.1 in) | 6.1 | 5.3 | 2.7 | 1.2 | 0.0 | 0.0 | 0.0 | 0.0 | 0.0 | 0.2 | 1.9 | 5.0 | 22.4 |
Source 1: NOAA
Source 2: National Weather Service

== Demographics ==
Historical population
| Census | Pop. | Note | %± |
|---|---|---|---|
| 1880 | 56 | | — |
| 1950 | 255 | | — |
| 1960 | 349 | | 36.9% |
| 1970 | 379 | | 8.6% |
| 1980 | 440 | | 16.1% |
| 1990 | 440 | | 0.0% |
| 2000 | 484 | | 10.0% |
| 2010 | 819 | | 69.2% |
| 2020 | 844 | | 3.1% |
U.S. Decennial Census

=== 2010 census ===
As of the census of 2010, there were 819 people, 317 households, and 233 families living in the village. The population density was 810.9 inhabitants per square mile (313.1/km^{2}). There were 330 housing units at an average density of 326.7 per square mile (126.1/km^{2}). The racial makeup of the village was 97.3% White, 1.2% African American, 0.5% from other races, and 1.0% from two or more races. Hispanic or Latino of any race were 1.3% of the population.

There were 317 households, of which 41.6% had children under the age of 18 living with them, 59.6% were married couples living together, 9.5% had a female householder with no husband present, 4.4% had a male householder with no wife present, and 26.5% were non-families. 17.4% of all households were made up of individuals, and 5% had someone living alone who was 65 years of age or older. The average household size was 2.58 and the average family size was 2.95.

The median age in the village was 32.1 years. 26.7% of residents were under the age of 18; 7.4% were between the ages of 18 and 24; 35.5% were from 25 to 44; 20.5% were from 45 to 64; and 9.9% were 65 years of age or older. The gender makeup of the village was 49.1% male and 50.9% female.

=== 2000 census ===
As of the census of 2000, there were 484 people, 187 households, and 147 families living in the village. The population density was 730.1 people per square mile (283.1/km^{2}). There were 196 housing units at an average density of 295.7 per square mile (114.7/km^{2}). The racial makeup of the village was 99.59% White, 0.21% Black or African American and 0.21% Asian. 0.62% of the population were Hispanic or Latino of any race.

There were 187 households, out of which 34.8% had children under the age of 18 living with them, 67.9% were married couples living together, 8.6% had a female householder with no husband present, and 20.9% were non-families. 17.6% of all households were made up of individuals, and 7.5% had someone living alone who was 65 years of age or older. The average household size was 2.59 and the average family size was 2.91.

In the village, the population was spread out, with 26.0% under the age of 18, 6.2% from 18 to 24, 31.0% from 25 to 44, 24.2% from 45 to 64, and 12.6% who were 65 years of age or older. The median age was 37 years. For every 100 females, there were 94.4 males. For every 100 females age 18 and over, there were 89.4 males.

The median income for a household in the village was $51,750, and the median income for a family was $55,227. Males had a median income of $36,250 versus $26,591 for females. The per capita income for the village was $21,270. About 0.8% of families and 2.6% of the population were below the poverty line, including none of those under the age of eighteen or sixty-five or over.

== Notable people ==
- Hugh McFarlane, Wisconsin state representative
- Charles R. Robertson, North Dakota politician
- Vincent James Ryan, bishop of the Roman Catholic Diocese of Bismarck
- Clarion A. Youmans, Wisconsin state senator

== Images ==
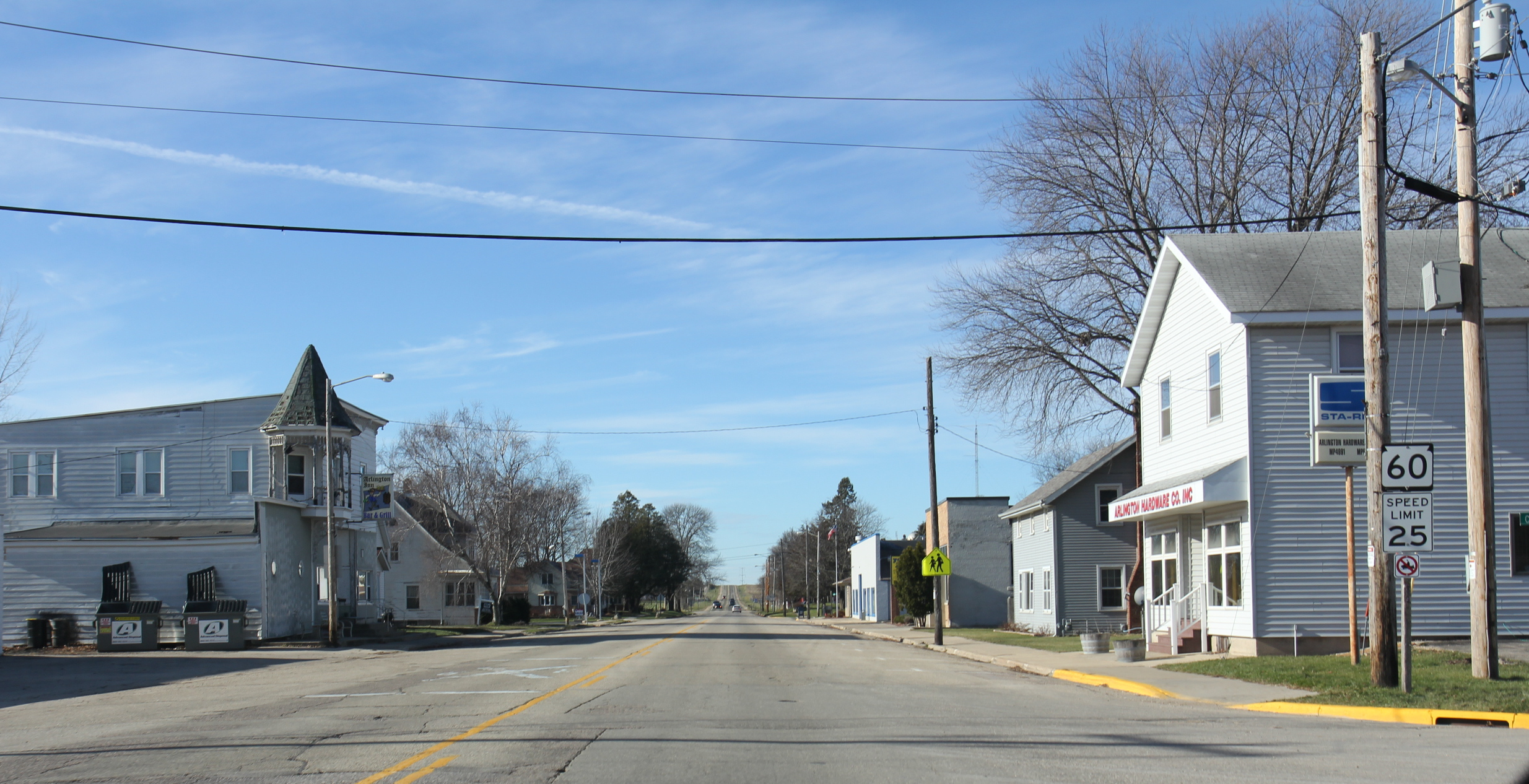
Looking west in downtown Arlington on WIS 60

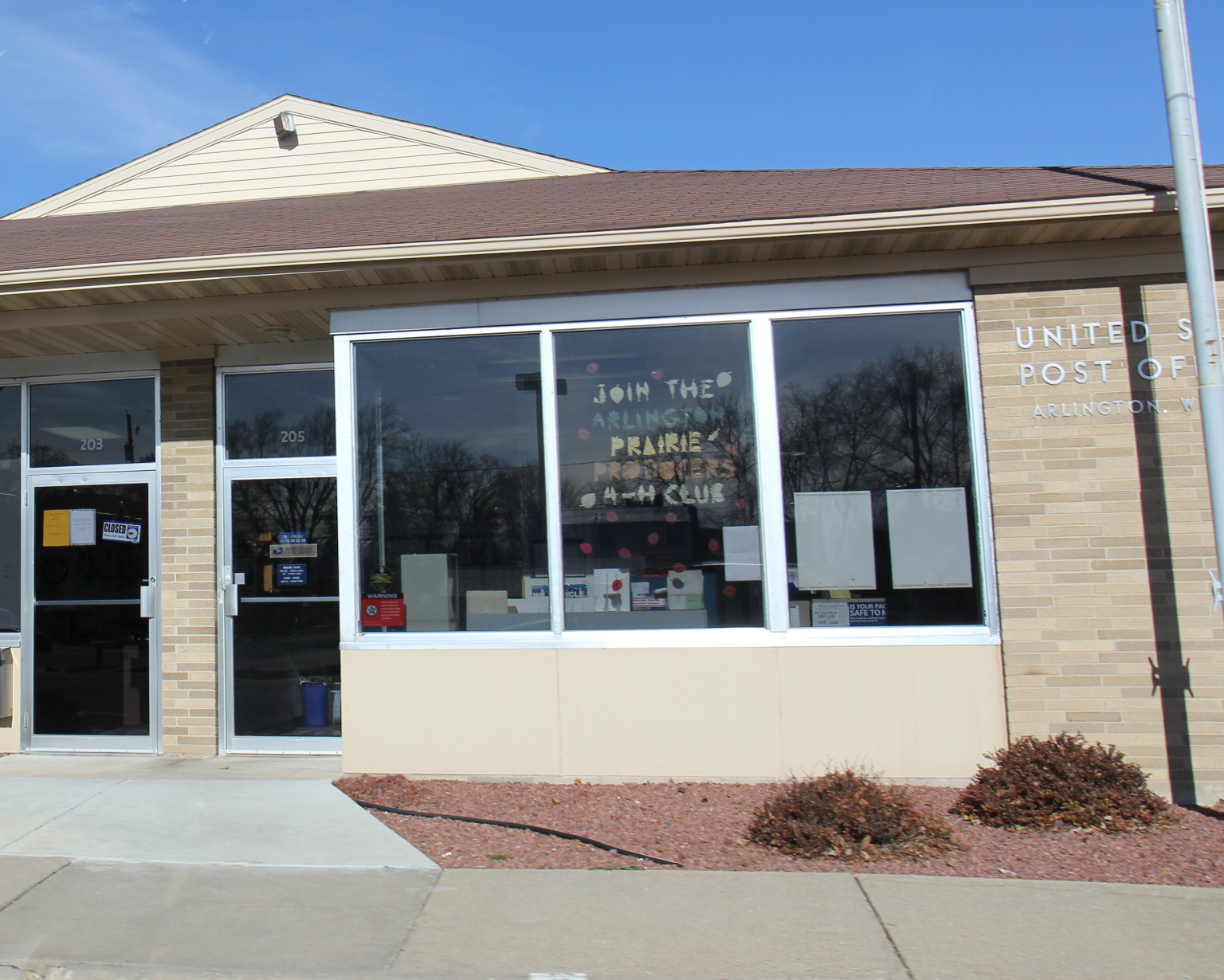
Post office

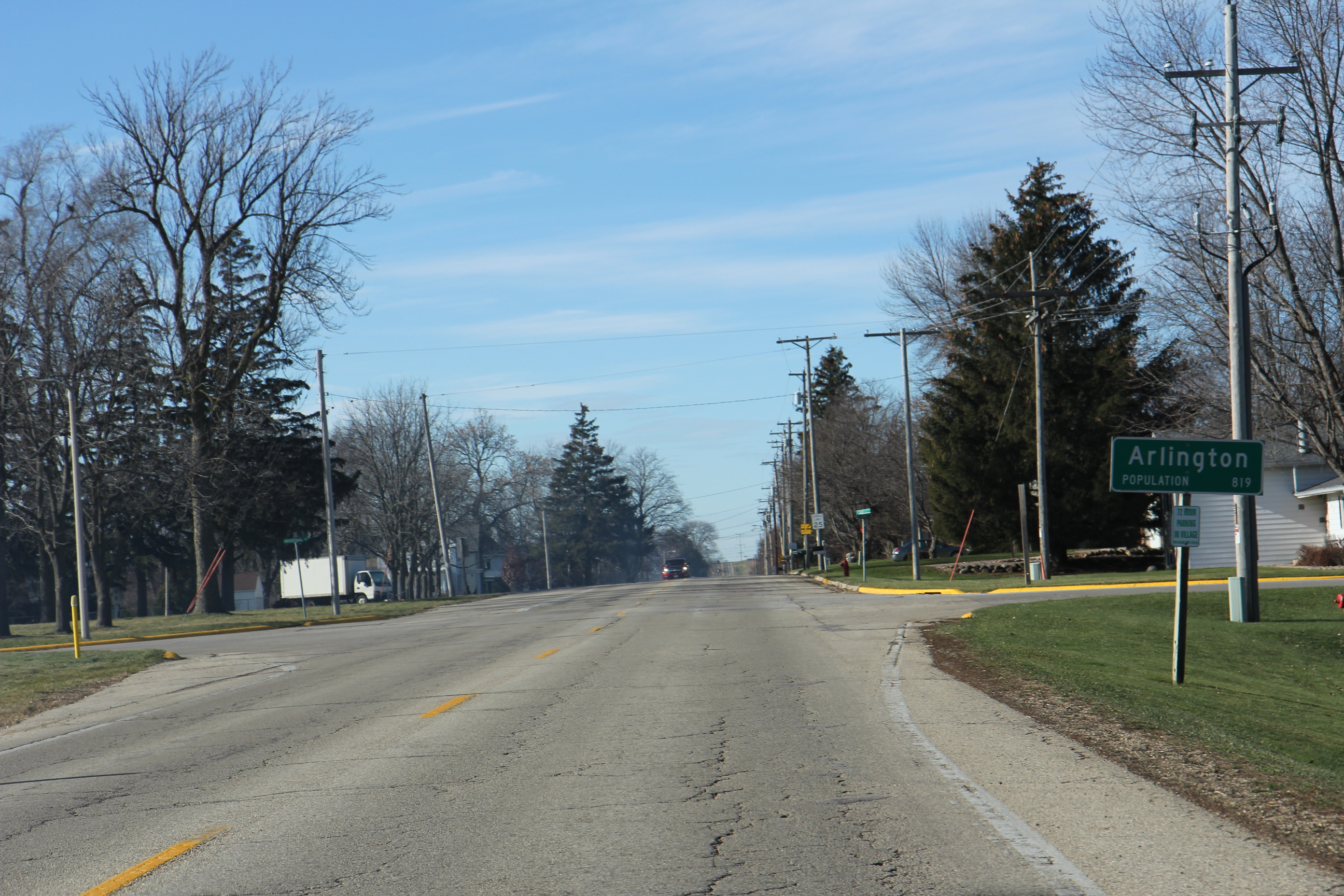
The sign for Arlington on WIS 60

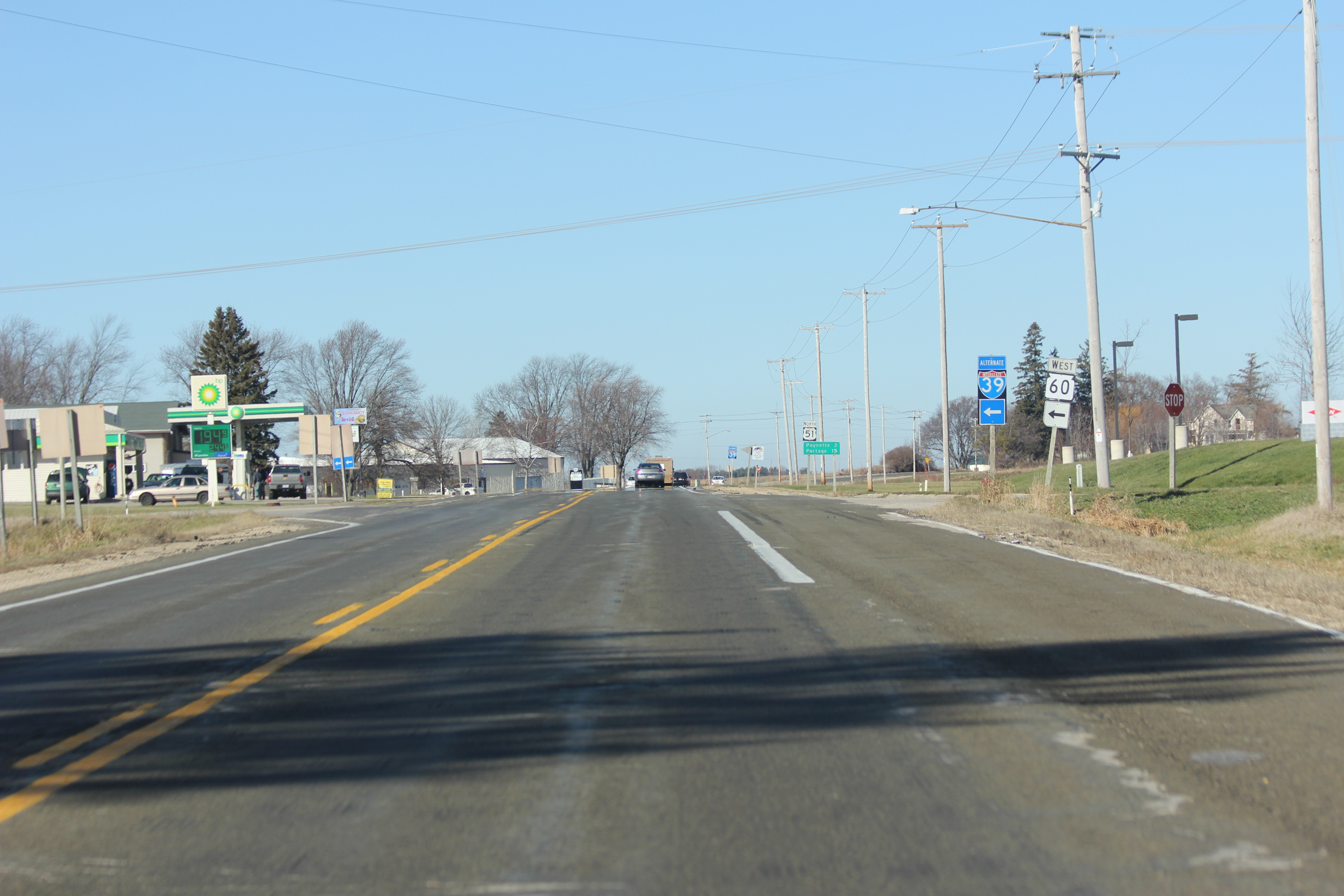
The intersection of WIS 60 and US 51 in Arlington

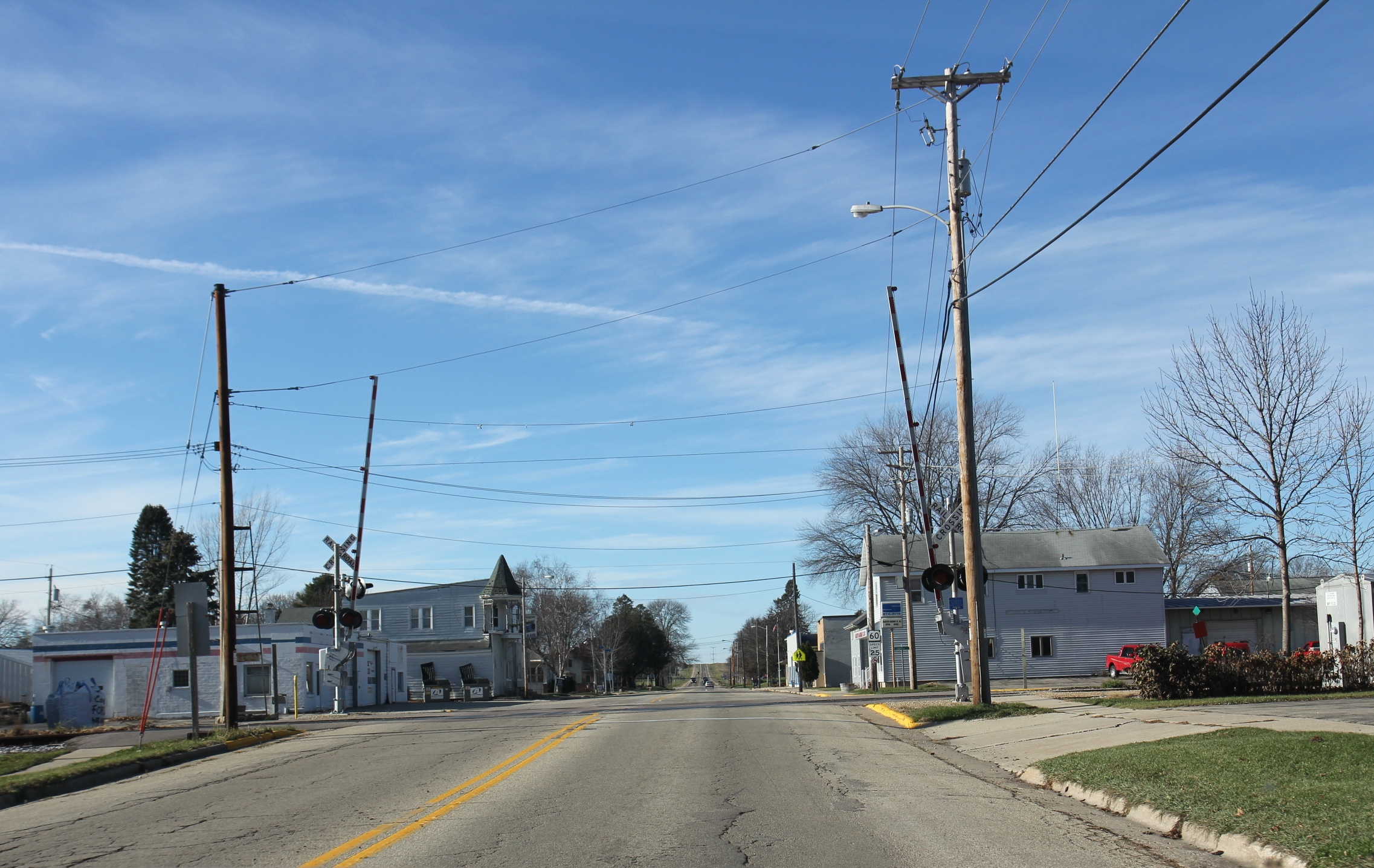
Railroad tracks
