= William W. Corning =

19th century American politician

W. W. Corning
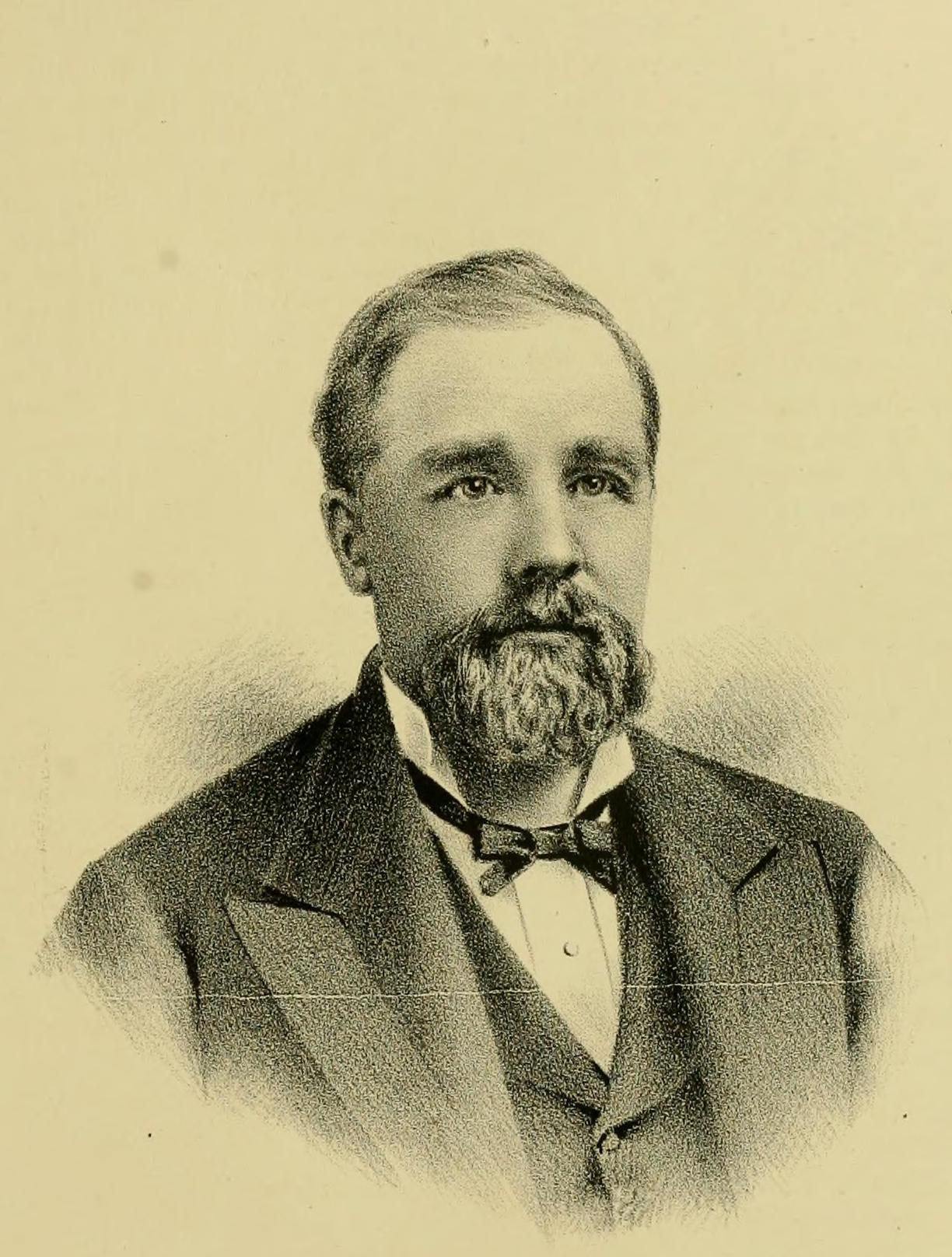
- Portrait from The History of Columbia County, Wisconsin (1880)

15th Mayor of Portage, Wisconsin
- In office April 1875 – April 1877
- Preceded by: C. R. Gallett
- Succeeded by: Josiah D. Arnold

Member of the Wisconsin State Assembly from the Columbia 1st district
- In office January 1, 1872 – January 6, 1873
- Preceded by: Stillman E. Dana
- Succeeded by: Stephen Brannan

Personal details
- Born: August 29, 1829 Mentor, Ohio, U.S.
- Died: June 19, 1895 (aged 65) Ironwood, Michigan, U.S.
- Resting place: Silver Lake Cemetery, Portage, Wisconsin
- Party: Democratic
- Spouse: Cornelia E. Smith (m. 1854; died 1885)
- Children: Anna M. (Arnold)^{(b. 1858; died 1934)}; Nellie R. (Wright); William Smith Corning^{(b. 1863; died 1916)}; Mary Louisa (Alverson)^{(b. 1865; died 1905)}; Belle T. (MacVichie)^{(b. 1875; died 1900)}

William Warren Corning (August 29, 1829 – June 19, 1895) was an American merchant and Democratic politician. He was the 15th mayor of Portage, Wisconsin (1875–1877), and represented western Columbia County in the Wisconsin State Assembly for the 1872 session.

== Biography ==
William Corning was born on August 29, 1829, in Mentor, Ohio. His father died when he was five years old, but he still received an academic education. He moved around central Ohio several times, going from Newark, to Hebron, to Columbus. He moved to Portage, Wisconsin, in October 1858, and by March 1859 he had established his hardware business. He served on the city council, the school board, and the Columbia County board of supervisors.

He was elected on the Democratic Party ticket to the Wisconsin State Assembly in 1871 from Columbia County's 1st Assembly district—at that time comprising the western part of the county. He did not run for re-election in 1872.

He was elected mayor of Portage in 1875 and was re-elected to another term in 1876.

He died at the home of his daughter in Ironwood, Michigan, in 1895. At the time he was a manager of a saw mill, employed by the Edward P. Allis Company.

Wisconsin State Assembly
Preceded by Stillman E. Dana	Member of the Wisconsin State Assembly from the Columbia 1st district January 1, 1872 – January 6, 1873	Succeeded by Stephen Brannan
Political offices
Preceded by C. R. Gallett	Mayor of Portage, Wisconsin; April 1875 – April 1877	Succeeded by Josiah D. Arnold
