= William Owen (Wisconsin politician, born 1825) =

American politician

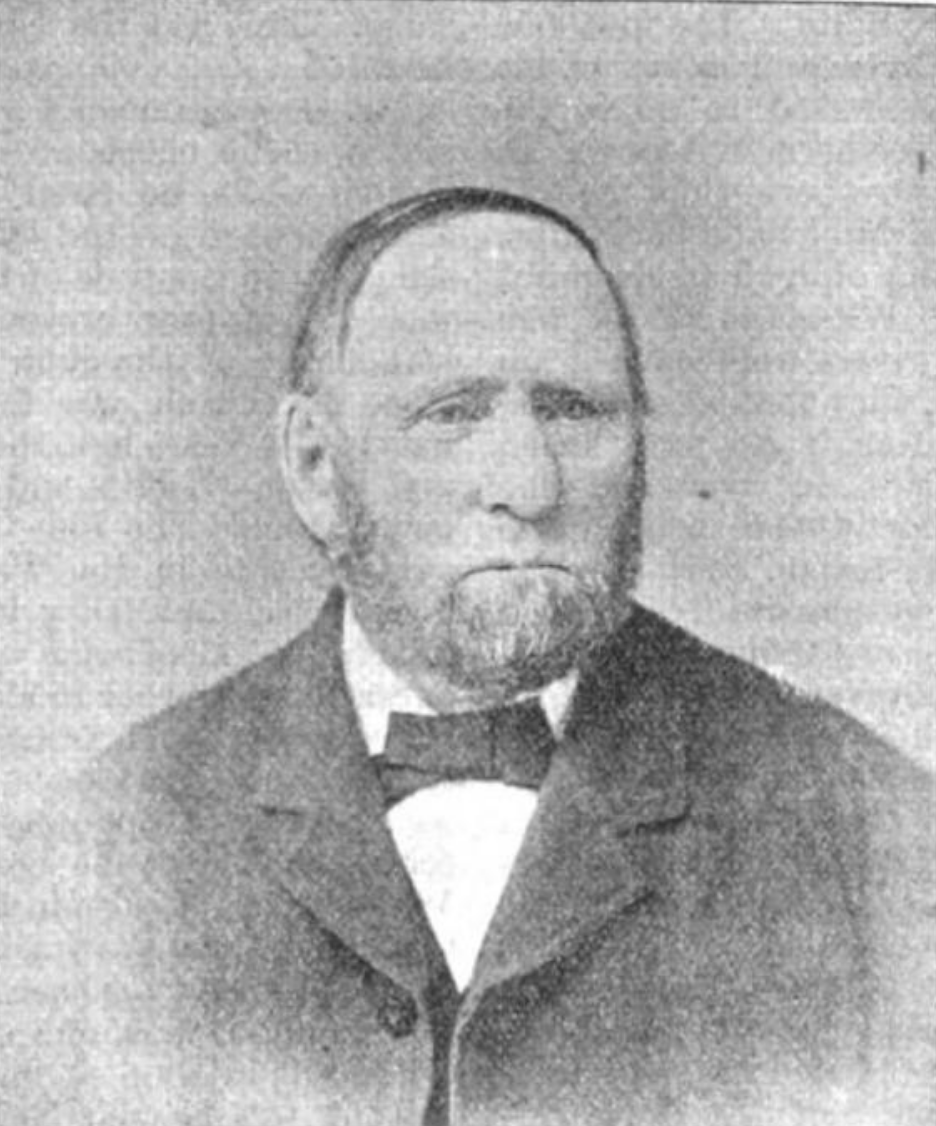

Member of the Wisconsin State Assembly
- In office 1865

Personal details
- Born: September 10, 1825 Llanelltyd, Wales
- Died: August 21, 1894 (aged 68) Caledonia, Wisconsin, US
- Spouse: Margaret Jones (m. 1853)
- Children: 10

William Owen (September 10, 1825 – August 21, 1894) was a member of the Wisconsin State Assembly.

== Biography ==
Owen was born on September 10, 1825, in Llanelltyd, Wales. His parents were John and Mary (Maesygarnedd) Owen. His family immigrated to Wisconsin in 1846. He married Margaret Jones in 1853. After residing in Portage, Wisconsin, he moved to Cambria, Wisconsin, in 1858 and became involved in the wheat and lumber industries. He moved to Randolph, Wisconsin, in 1867 and began farming. Owen and his family were Calvinistic Methodists. His brother, David, was also a member of the Assembly. He died on August 21, 1894, in Caledonia, Wisconsin.

== Assembly career ==
Owen was a member of the Assembly during the Legislature of 1865. He was a Republican.
