= Teddy Bullen =

English footballer

Personal information
- Full name: Edward A. Bullen
- Date of birth: 1884
- Place of birth: Warrington, England
- Date of death: 11 August 1917 (aged 32–33)
- Place of death: Vaulx-Vraucourt, France
- Height: 5 ft 9 in (1.75 m)
- Position: Left half

Senior career*
Years	Team	Apps	(Gls)
1903–1906	Altrincham	33	
1906–1917	Bury	188	(7)
- * Club domestic league appearances and goals

Edward A. Bullen (1884 – 11 August 1917) was an English professional footballer who made over 180 Football League appearances as a left half for Bury. He also captained the club.

== Personal life ==
Bullen was born in Warrington and grew up in Altrincham. While he was footballer with Bury, he ran a pub in Sankey, Warrington. In August 1916, two years after the outbreak of the First World War, Bullen enlisted as a gunner in the Royal Field Artillery. He was killed at Vaulx-Vraucourt, France on 11 August 1917 and was reburied in Vraucourt Copse Cemetery in the late 1920s. At the time of his death, Bullen's wife was pregnant with their first child.

== Career statistics ==
Appearances and goals by club, season and competition
Club	Season	League			FA Cup		Total	
Club	Season	Division	Apps	Goals	Apps	Goals	Apps	Goals
Bury	1914–15	Second Division	32	1	0	0	32	1
Career total			32	1	0	0	32	1
