= Winslow Bullen =

19th century American politician

Member of the Wisconsin State Assembly from the Columbia 2nd district
- In office January 3, 1870 – January 2, 1871
- Preceded by: Thornton Thompson
- Succeeded by: Thomas Sanderson

Personal details
- Born: April 27, 1826 Hannibal, New York, U.S.
- Died: October 17, 1909 (aged 83) Poynette, Wisconsin, U.S.
- Resting place: Arlington Presbyterian Cemetery, Arlington, Wisconsin
- Party: Republican
- Spouse: Selina F. Gilmore (m. 1852; died 1898)
- Children: Sarah Ellen Bullen^{(b. 1854; died 1931)}; William Kelsey Bullen^{(b. 1855; died 1928)}; David Murdie Bullen^{(b. 1858; died 1922)}; Mary E. Bullen^{(b. 1862; died 1951)}; Jennie E. Bullen^{(b. 1867; died 1959)}
- Relatives: John Bullen Jr. (cousin); William Bullen (cousin)

Winslow Bullen (April 27, 1826 – October 17, 1909) was an American farmer, Republican politician, and Wisconsin pioneer. He was a member of the Wisconsin State Assembly, representing southeast Columbia County during the 1870 term. He was one of the founders of Arlington, Wisconsin.

== Biography ==
Winslow Bullen was born in Oswego County, New York, in 1826. He received his early education there, but came west with his parents in 1836. In the Wisconsin Territory, he and his parents, along with extended family, became some of the founders of Kenosha, Wisconsin.

In the mid-1850s, Bullen moved west to Columbia County, Wisconsin, and settled in the town of Arlington. He established a farm there and became active in local affairs. He was elected as one of two town treasurers in 1858, and was then elected town chairman for five consecutive terms, from 1865 through 1870. As town chairman, he was an ex officio member of the Columbia County board of supervisors.

Bullen was nominated for Wisconsin State Assembly in 1869, running on the Republican Party ticket. He narrowly defeated Democrat John J. Sutton and went on to serve in the 23rd Wisconsin Legislature.

During his term in the Assembly, Bullen was named a director of the Madison and Portage Railroad. He remained a participant in the railroad company for at least the next decade. He did not run for re-election in 1870.

The following year, in collaboration with his father, Bullen platted what is now the village of Arlington, Wisconsin, and constructed the first building on that site. A few years later, he opened one of the first general stores in the village. Bullen remained active in the Columbia County Republican Party through the 1870s, but moved into other interests in his later years. In the 1880s, he was an officer in the Arlington Farmers Mutual Insurance Company.

In 1906, Bullen built a home in the village of Poynette, Wisconsin, where he resided with his three daughters until his death in 1909.

== Personal life and family ==
Winslow Bullen was the eldest of seven children born to David Bullen and his wife Jane (née Murdie). David Bullen's brother, John Bullen IV, and John's sons John Bullen V and William Bullen, were also part of the family group which established Kenosha, Wisconsin. John Bullen V is the most well known of the family and the namesake of Kenosha's Bullen Middle School.

Winslow Bullen married Selina F. Gilmore in 1852. They had five children together.

== Electoral history ==
=== Wisconsin Assembly (1869) ===
Wisconsin Assembly, Columbia County 2nd District Election, 1869
Party	Candidate	Votes	%	±%
General Election, November 2, 1869
Republican	Winslow Bullen	698	53.04%	
Democratic	John J. Sutton	618	46.96%	
Plurality		80	6.08%	
Total votes		1,316	100.0%	

Wisconsin State Assembly
Preceded by Thornton Thompson	Member of the Wisconsin State Assembly from the Columbia 2nd district January 3, 1870 – January 2, 1871	Succeeded by Thomas Sanderson
