= Charles Bullen (politician) =

American politician and legislator

Charles William 'Chic' Bullen (January 15, 1919 – December 23, 2009) was a Utah politician and legislator.

Born and died in Logan, Utah, United States, Bullen served in the Utah House of Representatives from 1971 to 1977 and then the Utah State Senate from 1977 to 1985. He was a Republican. In 1980 and 1988, Bullen was the Utah Chair of George H. W. Bush's presidential campaign. Bullen was the son of Logan mayor Roy Bullen.

Bullen received his bachelor's degree from the University of Utah and then served in the United States Navy during World War II. Bullen was a Latter-day Saint. He and his wife, the former Jonnie Blackett, had three children.
