= Charles Randall Gallett =

American politician

Charles Randall Gallett (January 6, 1833 – December 27, 1911) was a member of the Wisconsin State Assembly.

== Biography ==
Gallett was born on January 6, 1833, in Benton, New York. He relocated to Wisconsin in 1854. He was a merchant by trade. In 1865, Gallett married Lydia Viola Wells. They had seven children. Gallett died of heart failure in San Francisco in 1911.

== Political career ==
Gallett was a member of the Assembly in 1879. In addition, he was an alderman and mayor of Portage, Wisconsin. He was a Republican.
