= David Owen (Wisconsin politician) =

American politician

David Owen (May 13, 1828 – January 28, 1893) was a member of the Wisconsin State Assembly.

== Biography ==
Owen was born on May 13, 1828, in Merionethshire, Wales. He settled in what is now Caledonia, Columbia County, Wisconsin, in September 1846. On December 25, 1850, Owen married Jane Roberts. Owen and his family were Calvinistic Methodists. His brother William was also a member of the assembly. He died of heart disease at his home in Portage in 1893.

== Career ==
Owen was a member of the assembly in 1877. Other positions he held include town supervisor, town assessor and town treasurer of Caledonia. He was a Republican.
