= 23rd Wisconsin Legislature =

Wisconsin legislative term for 1870

←	22nd	24th	→
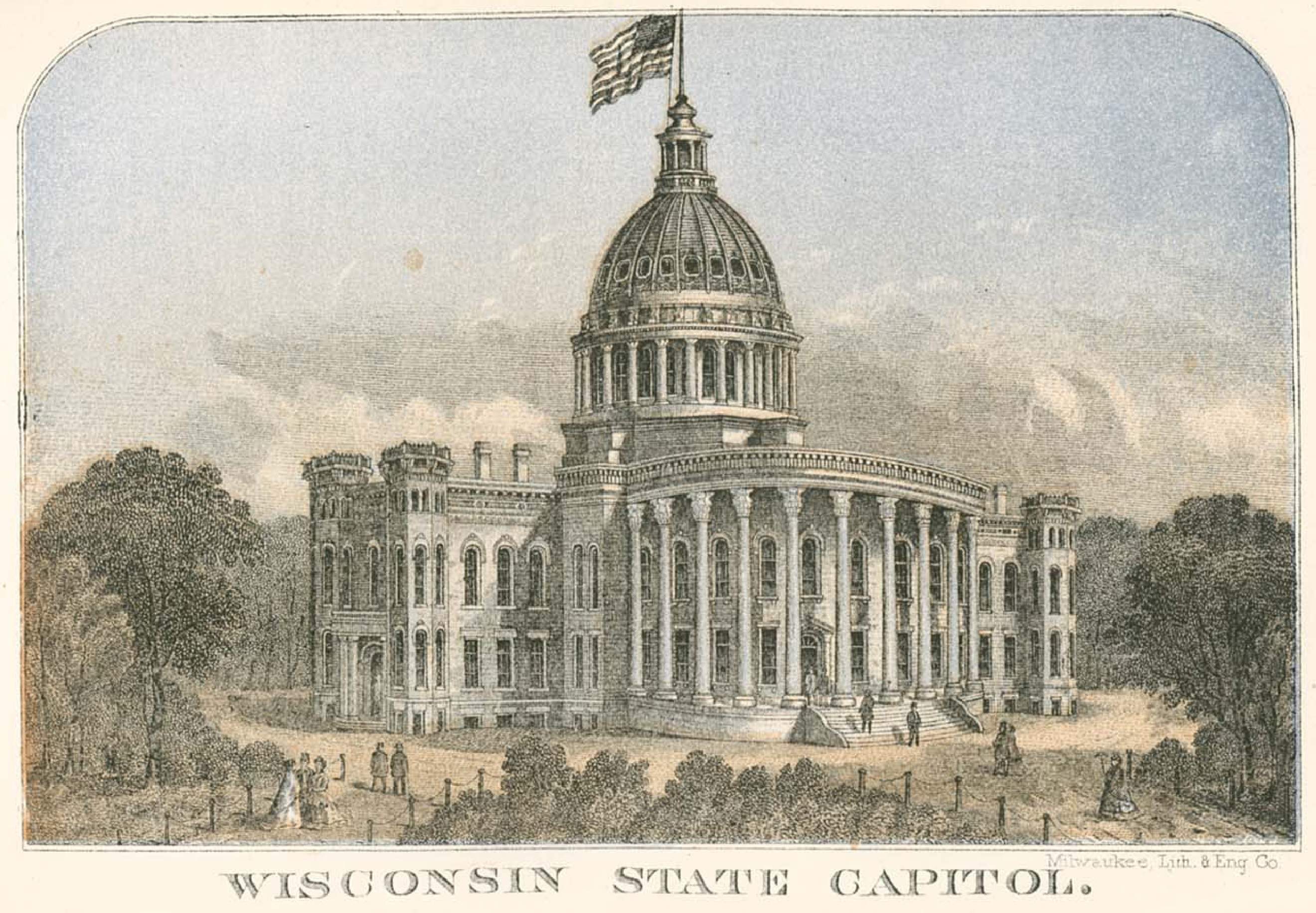
- Wisconsin State Capitol, 1863

Overview
- Legislative body: Wisconsin Legislature
- Meeting place: Wisconsin State Capitol
- Term: January 3, 1870 – January 2, 1871
- Election: November 2, 1869

Senate
- Members: 33
- Senate President: Thaddeus C. Pound (R)
- President pro tempore: David Taylor (R)
- Party control: Republican

Assembly
- Members: 100
- Assembly Speaker: James M. Bingham (R)
- Party control: Republican

Sessions
- 1st: January 12, 1870 – March 17, 1870

The Twenty-Third Wisconsin Legislature convened from January 12, 1870, to March 17, 1870, in regular session.

Senators representing even-numbered districts were newly elected for this session and were serving the first year of a two-year term. Assembly members were elected to a one-year term. Assembly members and even-numbered senators were elected in the general election of November 2, 1869. Senators representing odd-numbered districts were serving the second year of their two-year term, having been elected in the general election held on November 3, 1868.

The governor of Wisconsin during this entire term was Republican Lucius Fairchild, of Dane County, serving the first year of his third two-year term, having won re-election in the 1869 Wisconsin gubernatorial election.

== Major events ==
- February 3, 1870: Fifteenth Amendment to the United States Constitution was ratified by the required three-fourths of U.S. states.
- June 22, 1870: The U.S. Congress created the United States Department of Justice.
- July 19, 1870: France declared war on the Kingdom of Prussia, initiating the Franco-Prussian War.
- September 4, 1870: French Emperor Napoleon III was deposed and the French Third Republic was established.
- October 12, 1870: Former Confederate general Robert E. Lee died after suffering a stroke.

== Party summary ==
=== Senate summary ===
Senate partisan composition Democratic: 14 seats Republican: 19 seats

	Party (Shading indicates majority caucus)		Total	
	Democratic	Republican	Total	Vacant
End of previous Legislature	14	19	33	0
1st Session	14	19	33	0
Final voting share	42.42%	57.58%		
Beginning of the next Legislature	14	19	33	0

=== Assembly summary ===
Assembly partisan composition Democratic: 39 seats Independent: 1 seat Republican: 60 seats

	Party (Shading indicates majority caucus)			Total	
	Democratic	Ind.	Republican	Total	Vacant
End of previous Legislature	32	0	68	100	0
1st Session	39	1	60	100	0
Final voting share	39%	1%	60%		
Beginning of the next Legislature	40	3	57	100	0

== Sessions ==
- 1st Regular session: January 12, 1870 – March 17, 1870

== Leaders ==
=== Senate leadership ===
- President of the Senate: Thaddeus C. Pound (R)
- President pro tempore: David Taylor (R)

=== Assembly leadership ===
- Speaker of the Assembly: James M. Bingham (R)

== Members ==
=== Members of the Senate ===
Members of the Wisconsin Senate for the Twenty-Third Wisconsin Legislature:

Senate partisan representation Democratic: 14 seats Republican: 19 seats

Dist.	Counties	Senator	Residence	Party
01	Sheboygan	David Taylor	Sheboygan	Rep.
02	Brown, Door, Kewaunee	Lyman Walker	Ahnapee	Dem.
03	Ozaukee	Lyman Morgan	Ozaukee	Dem.
04	Washington	Adam Schantz	Addison	Dem.
05	Milwaukee (Northern Half)	William P. Lynde	Milwaukee	Dem.
06	Milwaukee (Southern Half)	Peter V. Deuster	Milwaukee	Dem.
07	Racine	Henry Stevens	Caledonia	Rep.
08	Kenosha	Milton Pettit	Kenosha	Rep.
09	Adams, Juneau, Monroe	William J. Kershaw	Big Spring	Rep.
10	Waukesha	John A. Rice	Merton	Dem.
11	Dane (Eastern Part)	Nelson Williams	Stoughton	Rep.
12	Walworth	Samuel Pratt	Spring Prairie	Rep.
13	Lafayette	Hamilton H. Gray	Darlington	Dem.
14	Sauk	Bennett Strong	Spring Green	Rep.
15	Iowa	Lemuel W. Joiner	Wyoming	Rep.
16	Grant	George C. Hazelton	Boscobel	Rep.
17	Rock	Charles G. Williams	Janesville	Rep.
18	Dodge (Western Part)	Samuel D. Burchard	Beaver Dam	Dem.
19	Manitowoc	George B. Reed	Manitowoc	Dem.
20	Fond du Lac	Hiram S. Town	Ripon	Rep.
21	Winnebago	Ira W. Fisher	Menasha	Rep.
22	Calumet, Oconto, Outagamie, Shawano	George Baldwin	Chilton	Dem.
23	Jefferson	William W. Woodman	Farmington	Dem.
24	Green	John C. Hall	Monroe	Rep.
25	Columbia	William M. Griswold	Columbus	Rep.
26	Dane (Western Part)	Romanzo E. Davis	Middleton	Rep.
27	Marathon, Portage, Waupaca, Wood	Charles M. Webb	Grand Rapids	Rep.
28	Ashland, Barron, Bayfield, Burnett, Douglas, Pierce, Polk, St. Croix	Edward H. Ives	Trimbelle	Dem.
29	Green Lake, Marquette, Waushara	George D. Waring	Berlin	Rep.
30	Crawford, Richland	George Krouskop	Richland Center	Dem.
31	La Crosse & Vernon	Cyrus M. Butt	Viroqua	Rep.
32	Buffalo, Chippewa, Clark, Dunn, Eau Claire, Jackson, Pepin, Trempealeau	William T. Price	Black River Falls	Rep.
33	Dodge (Eastern Part)	Satterlee Clark	Horicon	Dem.

=== Members of the Assembly ===
Members of the Assembly for the Twenty-Third Wisconsin Legislature:

Assembly partisan representation Democratic: 39 seats Independent: 1 seat Republican: 60 seats

Senate District	County	District	Representative	Party	Residence
09	Adams		Solon Pierce	Rep.	Friendship
28	Ashland, Barron, Bayfield, Burnett, Douglas, Polk		Samuel Dresser	Rep.	Osceola
02	Brown	1	Edward Hicks	Dem.	Green Bay
02	Brown	2	Michael Dockry	Dem.	Holland
32	Buffalo		James L. Hallock	Rep.	Nelson
22	Calumet		James Robinson	Dem.	Chilton
32	Chippewa & Dunn		Jedediah W. Granger	Rep.	Menomonie
32	Clark & Jackson		John Morrill	Rep.	Springfield
25	Columbia	1	Jonas Narracong	Rep.	Lodi
25	Columbia	2	Winslow Bullen	Rep.	Arlington
25	Columbia	3	Carmi W. Beach	Rep.	Pardeeville
30	Crawford		William Raymond	Rep.	Bell Center
11	Dane	1	Carpus Loveland	Rep.	Rutland
11	Dane	2	Willard H. Chandler	Rep.	Sun Prairie
26	Dane	3	John Adams	Dem.	Black Earth
26	Dane	4	John R. Crocker	Rep.	Montrose
26	Dane	5	Alden S. Sanborn	Dem.	Madison
18	Dodge	1	E. Adams Fowler	Rep.	Calamus
18	Dodge	2	Francis Johnston	Dem.	Chester
33	Dodge	3	Henry S. Burtch	Dem.	Williamstown
33	Dodge	4	Henry Bertram	Ind.	Watertown
02	Door & Kewaunee		Charles L. Harris	Rep.	Jacksonport
32	Eau Claire & Pepin		Charles R. Gleason	Dem.	Eau Claire
20	Fond du Lac	1	Jeremiah Dobbs Jr.	Dem.	Ripon
20	Fond du Lac	2	Roelof Sleyster	Rep.	Alto
20	Fond du Lac	3	John Boyd	Dem.	Fond du Lac
20	Fond du Lac	4	Uriah D. Mihills	Rep.	Fond du Lac
20	Fond du Lac	5	Daniel Cavanagh	Dem.	Osceola
20	Fond du Lac	6	Charles Geisse	Dem.	Taycheedah
16	Grant	1	Joel C. Squires	Dem.	Platteville
16	Grant	2	John Carthew	Rep.	Rockville
16	Grant	3	William P. Dewey	Rep.	Lancaster
16	Grant	4	Hugh A. W. McNair	Rep.	Fennimore
16	Grant	5	Luther Basford	Rep.	Glen Haven
24	Green	1	Calvin D. W. Leonard	Rep.	Exeter
24	Green	2	Thomas A. Jackson	Rep.	Spring Grove
29	Green Lake		Joseph C. Burdick	Rep.	Berlin
15	Iowa	1	Henry C. Barnard	Dem.	Avoca
15	Iowa	2	George W. Bliss	Rep.	Mineral Point
23	Jefferson	1	Daniel Hall	Rep.	Watertown
23	Jefferson	2	Charles H. Phillips	Rep.	Lake Mills
23	Jefferson	3	Wilbur H. Tousley	Dem.	Jefferson
23	Jefferson	4	James M. Bingham	Rep.	Palmyra
09	Juneau		Jerome B. Potter	Dem.	Sentinel
08	Kenosha		Alexander Bailey	Rep.	Salem
31	La Crosse	1	Theodore Rodolf	Dem.	La Crosse
31	La Crosse	2	Powers Moulton	Rep.	Onalaska
13	Lafayette	1	Thomas T. Duffy	Dem.	Benton
13	Lafayette	2	Henry W. Barnes	Dem.	Wiota
19	Manitowoc	1	John Barth	Dem.	Schleswig
19	Manitowoc	2	Michael Fitzgerald	Dem.	Maple Grove
19	Manitowoc	3	Carl H. Schmidt	Dem.	Manitowoc
27	Marathon & Wood		Charles Hoeflinger	Dem.	Wausau
29	Marquette		Spencer A. Pease	Dem.	Montello
05	Milwaukee	1	Stephen A. Harrison	Rep.	Milwaukee
05	Milwaukee	2	George Abert	Dem.	Milwaukee
06	Milwaukee	3	James McGrath	Dem.	Milwaukee
06	Milwaukee	4	Nathan Brick	Rep.	Milwaukee
06	Milwaukee	5	John Fellenz	Dem.	Milwaukee
05	Milwaukee	6	Daniel H. Richards	Dem.	Milwaukee
05	Milwaukee	7	Daniel H. Johnson	Rep.	Milwaukee
05	Milwaukee	8	Henry C. Runkel	Dem.	Milwaukee
06	Milwaukee	9	Enoch Chase	Dem.	Lake
06	Milwaukee	10	Frederick A. Zautcke	Rep.	Milwaukee
09	Monroe		Charles A. Hunt	Rep.	Jefferson
22	Oconto & Shawano		James M. Adams	Dem.	Oconto
22	Outagamie		Charles E. McIntosh	Dem.	Appleton
03	Ozaukee		Adolphus Zimmermann	Dem.	Mequon
28	Pierce		Oliver S. Powell	Rep.	River Falls
27	Portage		Frederick Huntley	Rep.	Buena Vista
07	Racine	1	Albert L. Phillips	Rep.	Racine
07	Racine	2	Ira A. Rice	Rep.	Waterford
30	Richland		James H. Miner	Rep.	Richland Center
17	Rock	1	Isaac M. Bennett	Rep.	Evansville
17	Rock	2	Thomas H. Goodhue	Rep.	Lima
17	Rock	3	Adelmorn Sherman	Rep.	Janesville
17	Rock	4	John Hammond	Rep.	Turtle
17	Rock	5	Alexander Graham	Rep.	Janesville
14	Sauk	1	Carl C. Kuntz	Rep.	Black Hawk
14	Sauk	2	George G. Swain	Rep.	New Buffalo
01	Sheboygan	1	Horatio G. H. Reed	Dem.	Sheboygan
01	Sheboygan	2	J. Henry McNeel	Rep.	Greenbush
01	Sheboygan	3	Jacob A. Blanshan	Rep.	Scott
28	St. Croix		Charles D. Parker	Rep.	Pleasant Valley
32	Trempealeau		Isaac Clark	Rep.	Galesville
31	Vernon	1	Reuben May	Rep.	Springville
31	Vernon	2	Van S. Bennett	Rep.	Webster
12	Walworth	1	Henry Hall	Rep.	Walworth
12	Walworth	2	Stephen R. Edgerton	Rep.	Spring Prairie
12	Walworth	3	William Burgit	Rep.	East Troy
04	Washington	1	Henry V. R. Wilmot	Dem.	Trenton
04	Washington	2	Densmore W. Maxon	Dem.	Cedar Creek
10	Waukesha	1	Henry Totten	Dem.	Waukesha
10	Waukesha	2	John D. McDonald	Dem.	Summit
10	Waukesha	3	Thomas McCarty	Dem.	Menomonee
27	Waupaca		Albert V. Balch	Rep.	Weyauwega
29	Waushara		Theophilus F. Metcalf	Rep.	Marion
21	Winnebago	1	Emery Kennedy	Rep.	Oshkosh
21	Winnebago	2	William P. Rounds	Rep.	Menasha
21	Winnebago	3	James H. Foster	Rep.	Koro

== Employees ==
=== Senate employees ===
- Chief Clerk: Leander B. Hills
  - Assistant Clerk: H. H. Rust
    - Bookkeeper: Robert A. Gillett
  - Engrossing Clerk: A. J. High
  - Enrolling Clerk: J. H. Balch
  - Transcribing Clerk: Julia A. Hubbard
- Sergeant-at-Arms: Earl M. Rogers
  - Assistant Sergeant-at-Arms: William Freeman
- Postmaster: L. D. Frost
  - Assistant Postmaster: T. Watson
- Doorkeeper: D. W. Collins
- Doorkeeper: W. Cook
  - Assistant Doorkeeper: Levi Burgett
  - Assistant Doorkeeper: F. Chamberlain
  - Gallery Doorkeeper: H. A. Wilcox
  - Night Watch: John Grant Jr.
- President's Attendant: F. Bowers
- Porter: A. T. Conger
- Messengers:
  - Eddie Knight
  - Willie Hadley
  - Charlie Young
  - Charles F. Torgerson
  - Charlie S. Vedder
  - Max Roeder

=== Assembly employees ===
- Chief Clerk: Ephraim W. Young
  - Assistant Clerk: William M. Newcomb
    - Bookkeeper: Fred A. Dennett
  - Engrossing Clerk: A. H. Reed
  - Enrolling Clerk: S. F. Hammond
  - Transcribing Clerk: G. H. Brock
- Sergeant-at-Arms: O. C. Johnson
  - 1st Assistant Sergeant-at-Arms: O. C. Bissell
  - 2nd Assistant Sergeant-at-Arms: S. C. McDonald
- Postmaster: J. H. Wagoner
  - 1st Assistant Postmaster: Myron DeWolf
  - 2nd Assistant Postmaster: Henry Stannard
- Doorkeepers:
  - W. S. Seavey
  - A. B. Finch
  - Joseph F. Wigmore
  - W. W. Dantz
- Night Watch: John K. Parish
- Firemen:
  - Sidney Emmes
  - E. G. Garner
- Gallery Attendants:
  - George A. Phinney
  - H. S. Grinde
- Committee Room Attendants:
  - T. D. Powers
  - Fred Keud
  - Hiram Steffins
  - George Slurzsby
- Porter: J. W. Plato
- Speaker's Messenger: C. Bingham
- Chief Clerk's Messenger: Frank R. Norton
- Messengers:
  - Emile Hammer
  - Frank Beyler
  - Daniel Fitzpatrick
  - Frank Johnson
  - Henry A. Douglas
  - Charles S. Parker
  - Marshall Jackson
  - Oscar Green
  - Clarence Patch
  - Willie Holmes
  - Thaddeus W. Sutliff
