= James Harvey Miner =

American lawyer and politician from Wisconsin (1830–1913)

James H. Miner
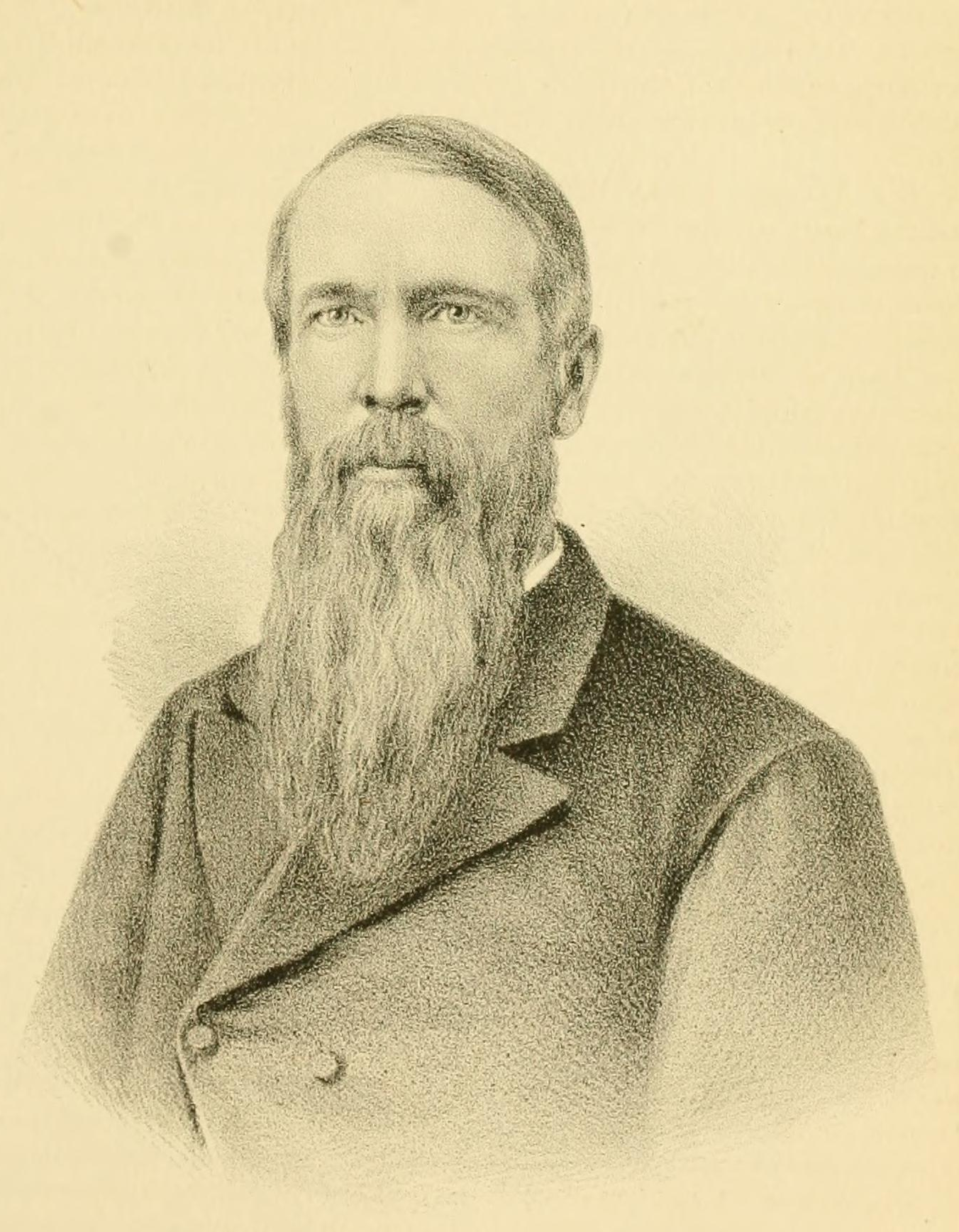
- From History of Richland County, Wisconsin (1906)

Member of the Wisconsin State Assembly from the Richland district
- In office January 3, 1870 – January 2, 1871
- Preceded by: Joseph M. Thomas
- Succeeded by: Elihu Bailey

2nd Village President of Richland Center, Wisconsin
- In office April 1868 – April 1869
- Preceded by: Daniel Downs
- Succeeded by: Gilbert L. Laws

County Judge of Richland County, Wisconsin
- In office January 1, 1866 – January 3, 1870
- Preceded by: Alvin B. Slaughter
- Succeeded by: Henry W. Fries

District Attorney of Richland County, Wisconsin
- In office January 1, 1857 – January 1, 1861
- Preceded by: H. A. Eastland
- Succeeded by: A. P. Thompson

Personal details
- Born: February 4, 1830 Lockport, New York, U.S.
- Died: August 18, 1913 (aged 83) Richland Center, Wisconsin, U.S.
- Resting place: Richland Center Cemetery, Richland Center, Wisconsin
- Party: Whig (before 1856); Republican
- Spouse: Sarah Ann Dunn (died 1913)
- Children: Alberka Lena Dunn (Berryman)^{(b. 1858; died 1951)}; Grant Lenox Miner^{(b. 1861; died 1933)}; Frederick James Miner^{(b. 1865; died 1866)}; Caroline (Schuerman)^{(b. 1869; died 1937)}
- Education: Hillsdale College

James Harvey Miner (February 4, 1830 – August 18, 1913) was an American lawyer, Republican politician, and Wisconsin pioneer. He was a member of the Wisconsin State Assembly, representing Richland County in the 1870 session, and served as district attorney and county judge. He was also the principal editor of History of Richland County, Wisconsin (1906).

== Early life ==
James H. Miner was born in Lockport, New York, in February 1830. He lived his early years on his father's farm in Lockport. The family moved west when James Miner was eight years old, settling in Hillsdale County, Michigan, where he was raised and educated. He graduated from Hillsdale College (then known as Michigan Central College), and went on to study law with Judge E. H. C. Wilson.

In 1852, he moved to Potosi, Wisconsin, and read law in the office of Orsamus Cole until Cole joined the Wisconsin Supreme Court in 1855. Miner was admitted to the bar at Lancaster, Wisconsin, in April 1855, then moved east to Richland Center, in Richland County, where he was one of the earliest settlers in that village. He taught school for one winter, then began his legal career in a partnership with Daniel B. Priest.

== Elected office ==
Miner was originally a member of the Whig Party, but joined the Republican Party when it was organized in 1854. Running on the Republican ticket, he was elected district attorney of Richland County in 1856 and was subsequently re-elected in 1858. In December 1856, he was also one of the founding directors of the Pine River Valley Bank, but the Panic of 1857 ruined that business before it actually opened to the public.

He focused on his legal career in the early 1860s, but was then elected county judge in 1865, serving a four-year term. While serving as judge, he was elected the 2nd village president of Richland Center in 1868. The following year, in the fall of 1869, he was the Republican candidate for Wisconsin State Assembly in the Richland County district, and defeated "People's Democrat" Ira S. Haseltine. He did not run for re-election in 1870.

In 1876, he was chosen as a presidential elector for the Republican slate in Wisconsin, but was obliged to resign before the general election after he was appointed postmaster at Richland Center by President Grant. He went on to serve five years as postmaster. During this time, he was also appointed to the board of trustees of the industrial school at Waukesha and served a three year term.

== Legal and business career ==
In 1878, Miner formed a legal partnership with James H. Berryman, who married his eldest daughter soon after. That partnership continued for ten years. In 1893, Miner partnered with his own son, Grant, in the firm Miner & Miner, which would endure for the rest of his life.

In business, he was an investor and director in the Stevens Point & Pine River Valley Railroad, which was later purchased by the Chicago, Milwaukee & St. Paul Railroad. He was later one of the organizers of the Richland Center state bank.

James Miner died in August 1913, after a brief illness.

== Personal life and family ==
James H. Miner was the seventh child of Luther Miner and his third wife, Lena Eleanor Grant.

His great grandfather, Jesse Miner, was one of the 1,500 Continental volunteers who took possession of Bunker Hill on June 16, 1775, and fought the British there in the Battle of Bunker Hill the following day. The Miners trace their lineage back to Thomas Miner, who came to the Massachusetts Bay Colony in 1630 and later moved to the Connecticut Colony. Ulysses S. Grant is also a descendant of this Thomas Miner.

Further back, the Miners traced the origin of their family name to Henry Bullman, who was given the name "Miner" by King Edward III of England, after he led a band of miners to war for the King during the first years of the Hundred Years' War.

James H. Miner married Sarah Ann Dunn in Volga, Iowa, on May 12, 1855. Sarah Dunn was a native of Alleghany County, New York. The Miners had five children, though one died in infancy. Their eldest child, Alberka—"Berkie"—was the first graduate of the Richland High School and went on to marry Miner's one-time law partner, J. H. Berryman. Miner's eldest son, Grant, followed his father into the legal profession and worked as his partner for much of the latter part of his life.

== Electoral history ==
=== Richland County District Attorney (1856, 1858) ===
Richland County, Wisconsin, District Attorney Election, 1856
Party	Candidate	Votes	%	±%
General Election, November 4, 1856
Republican	James H. Miner	857	66.59%	
Independent Democrat	A. P. Thompson	310	24.09%	
Democratic	C. G. Rodolf	120	9.32%	
Plurality		547	42.50%	
Total votes		1,287	100.0%	
Republican hold				

Richland County, Wisconsin, District Attorney Election, 1858
Party	Candidate	Votes	%	±%
General Election, November 2, 1858
Republican	James H. Miner (incumbent)	727	49.02%	−17.57%
Democratic	William F. Crawford	568	38.30%	
Independent	David S. Hamilton	100	6.74%	
Independent	C. E. Livingston	88	5.93%	
Plurality		159	10.72%	
Total votes		1,483	100.0%	+15.23%
Republican hold				

=== Richland County Judge (1865) ===
Richland County, Wisconsin, County Judge Election, 1865
Party	Candidate	Votes	%	±%
General Election, April 4, 1865
Republican	James H. Miner	625	62.07%	+14.50%
Democratic	Alvin B. Slaughter	379	37.64%	
	Scattering	3	0.30%	
Plurality		246	24.43%	+19.56%
Total votes		1,007	100.0%	-30.89%
Republican gain from Democratic				

=== Wisconsin Assembly (1869) ===
Wisconsin Assembly, Richand District Election, 1869
Party	Candidate	Votes	%	±%
General Election, November 2, 1869
Republican	James H. Miner	1,063	53.47%	−5.71%
Democratic	Ira S. Haseltine	925	46.53%	
Plurality		138	6.94%	-11.43%
Total votes		1,988	100.0%	-26.97%
Republican hold				

== Published works ==
- Miner, Judge James H., ed. (1906). History of Richland County, Wisconsin. Western Historical Association.

Wisconsin State Assembly
Preceded by Joseph M. Thomas	Member of the Wisconsin State Assembly from the Richland district January 3, 1870 – January 2, 1871	Succeeded by Elihu Bailey
Political offices
Preceded by Daniel Downs	Village President of Richland Center, Wisconsin; April 1868 – April 1869	Succeeded by Gilbert L. Laws
Legal offices
Preceded by H. A. Eastland	District Attorney of Richland County, Wisconsin; January 1, 1857 – January 1, 1861	Succeeded by A. P. Thompson
Preceded by Alvin B. Slaughter	County Judge of Richland County, Wisconsin; January 1, 1866 – January 3, 1870	Succeeded by Henry W. Fries
