= Moritz Becker =

American politician in Wisconsin (1827–1906)

Moritz N. Becker

Member of the Wisconsin State Assembly from the Milwaukee 9th district
- In office January 1, 1872 – January 5, 1874
- Preceded by: Valentin Knœll
- Succeeded by: John L. Semmann

Personal details
- Born: February 2, 1827 Gaugrehweiler, Palatinate, Kingdom of Bavaria
- Died: 1906 (aged 78–79) Milwaukee County, Wisconsin, U.S.
- Resting place: Spring Hill Cemetery, Milwaukee
- Party: Democratic
- Spouse: Mina Gutman (m. 1863; died 1902)
- Children: 5 children

Military service
- Allegiance: Kingdom of Bavaria
- Branch/service: Bavarian Army
- Years of service: 1848–1849
- Rank: 1st Lieutenant
- Battles/wars: First Schleswig War: Battle of Dybbøl (1848)

Moritz Nathan Becker (February 2, 1827 – 1906) was a German American immigrant, produce dealer, and politician. He self-identified as a "Progressive Democrat", then "Liberal Democrat", while serving two terms in the Wisconsin State Assembly during the 1870s.

== Background ==
Becker was born in Gaugrehweiler, Kingdom of Bavaria on February 2, 1827. He received an academic education, and became a first lieutenant of cavalry in the Bavarian Army, and fought in Schleswig-Holstein during the First Schleswig War. He emigrated to the United States in 1850, lived in New York City for two years, then moved to Milwaukee in 1852.

In 1859, he became a member of the Milwaukee synagogue B'ne Jeshurun when his own Congregation Ansche Emmeth merged with it. He became an active member of the Democratic Party. In 1863 he married Minnie Gutman (1840 - 1902), a native of Württemberg; by 1881, they would have five children.

== Public office ==
For two years Becker was a police justice in Milwaukee. In 1871 he was elected unopposed to the Assembly's 9th Milwaukee County district (the 9th Ward of the City of Milwaukee) as a "Progressive Democrat", succeeding Democrat John L. Semmann. He was assigned to the standing committee on assessment and collection of taxes.

In 1872 Becker was re-elected from the same district, which had added Milwaukee's new 10th Ward, this time as a "Liberal Democrat", with 1,006 votes to 518 for Republican George H. Walther. He was assigned to the committees on ways and means, and on state affairs.

By September 1873, he was officially part of the Liberal Reform Party, a short-lived coalition of Democrats, reform and Liberal Republicans, and Grangers formed in 1873, which secured the election of a Governor of Wisconsin and a number of state legislators. He was not a candidate for re-election himself, and was succeeded by Semmann (who defeated a Reform candidate).

== After the Assembly ==
From 1875 to 1877, Becker was a deputy sheriff for Milwaukee County. He later found employment at the Pleasant Valley Distillery in Milwaukee.

In 1888, he was vice-president of a lodge of the Jewish fraternal order Kesher Shel Barzel. As of 1893, the Beckers were both still living in Milwaukee.

In 1899, he was elected Secretary of a local B'nai Brith chapter.
