= Henry C. Runkel =

19th century American politician

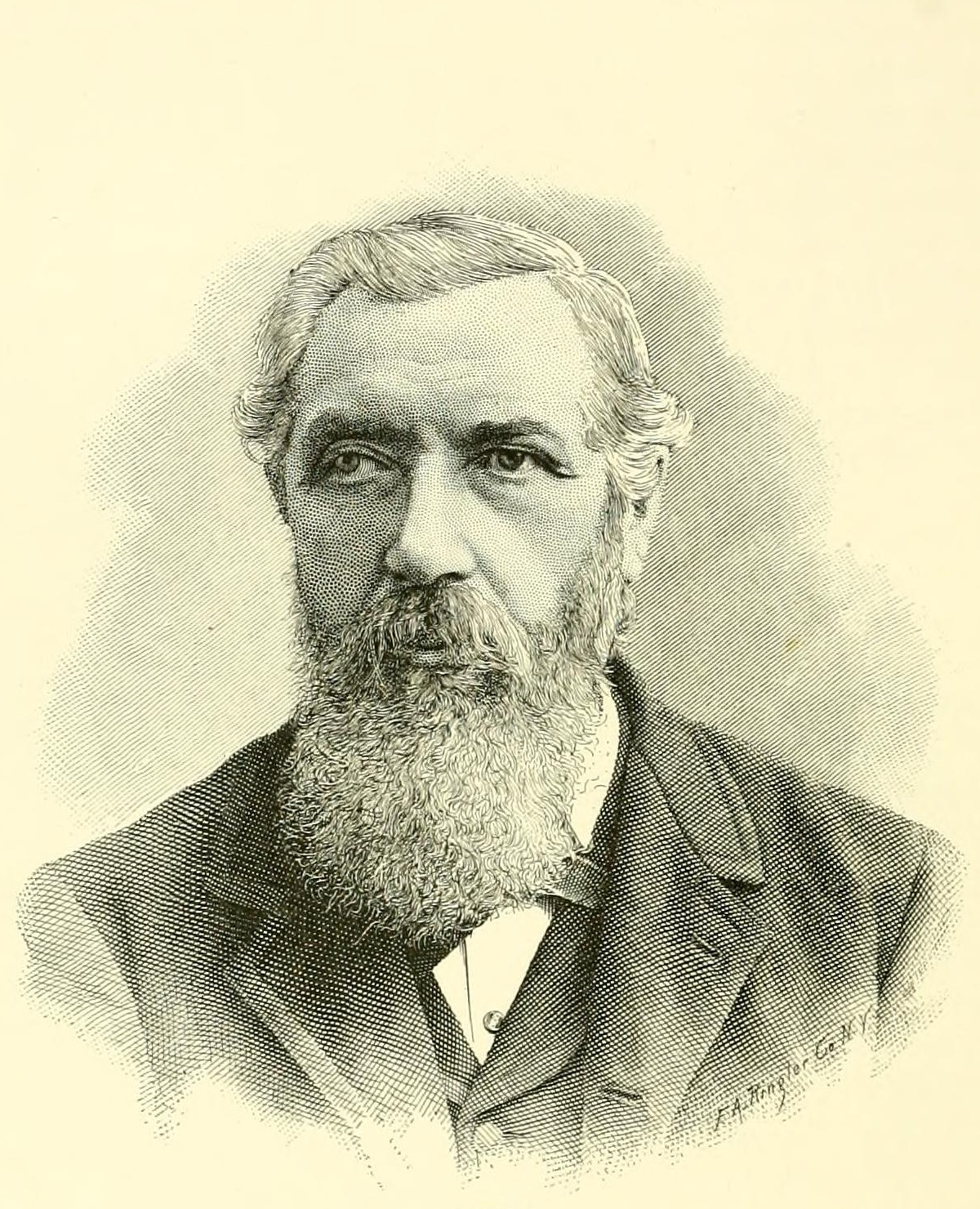
- Engraving by F. A. Ringler Co., from History of Milwaukee from its first settlement to the year 1895 (1895)

Member of the Wisconsin State Assembly from the Milwaukee 8th district
- In office January 6, 1868 – January 1, 1871
- Preceded by: Louis Hellberg
- Succeeded by: John L. Semmann

Personal details
- Born: April 17, 1834 Höchst, Duchy of Nassau
- Died: June 27, 1895 (aged 61) Milwaukee, Wisconsin, U.S.
- Resting place: Union Cemetery, Milwaukee
- Party: Democratic
- Spouses: Henrietta Carnarius (m. 1855; died 1877); Elizabeth Von Thierstein (m. 1878–1895)
- Children: 10 with Henrietta Carnarius; 1 adopted stepdaughter
- Profession: Lawyer

Henry Conrad Runkel (April 17, 1834 – June 27, 1895) was a German American immigrant, lawyer, and Democratic politician. He was a member of the Wisconsin State Assembly, representing the northwest quadrant of the city of Milwaukee during the 1868, 1869, and 1870 sessions.

== Early life ==
Henry C. Runkel was born on April 17, 1834, in Höchst, in what is now western Germany. At the time of his birth, this area was part of the Duchy of Nassau. When he was still a child, he moved with his family to the nearby city of Mainz, which was in the domain of the Grand Duchy of Hesse. He was largely educated in Mainz, attending first the public schools and then the school of arts.

== Legal career ==
In 1851 he emigrated to the United States, landing at New York City in August of that year. He remained there a few months, then moved to Milwaukee, where he taught school until 1858. At that time, he began studying law. He was admitted to the bar in 1862 and immediately started a legal practice in Milwaukee.

In 1877 he formed a partnership with Robert N. Austin, and added William H. Austin to the firm in 1886, which was then known as Austin, Runkel & Austin. The firm dissolved in 1891, when Robert Austin was elected to the Milwaukee Superior Court. Runkel then formed a partnership with his son, Albert C. Runkel, which continued for the rest of his life.

== Political career ==
While developing his legal career, Runkel also became involved in politics. He was elected justice of the peace from 1858 through 1864, and was elected city assessor in 1860 and 1861. He was elected to three consecutive terms in the Wisconsin State Assembly in 1867, 1868, and 1869, running on the Democratic Party ticket. He represented Milwaukee County's 8th Assembly district—the 9th ward of the city of Milwaukee—which then comprised the northwest corner of the city. He also served twelve years on the Milwaukee school board.

== Personal life and family ==
Henry C. Runkel was a child of George P. Runkel and his wife Anna M. (née Lemb). George P. Runkel served as a cavalry officer in Napoleon's army as part of the Confederation of the Rhine.

Runkel married twice. His first wife was Henrietta Carnarius, another German American immigrant. They married in 1855 and had ten children before her death in 1877. A year later, Runkel married Elizabeth Von Thierstein, a Swiss immigrant, and adopted her daughter Fannie.

Runkel died on June 27, 1895, at his home in Milwaukee.

== Electoral history ==
=== Wisconsin Assembly (1867, 1868, 1869) ===
Wisconsin Assembly, Milwaukee 8th District Election, 1869
Party	Candidate	Votes	%	±%
General Election, November 2, 1869
Democratic	Henry C. Runkel (incumbent)	546	74.59%	
Republican	George Seaman	186	25.41%	
Plurality		360	49.18%	
Total votes		732	100.0%	
Democratic hold				

Wisconsin State Assembly
Preceded by Louis Hellberg	Member of the Wisconsin State Assembly from the Milwaukee 8th district January 6, 1868 – January 1, 1871	Succeeded by John L. Semmann
