= Charles A. Hunt (Wisconsin politician) =

19th century American politician

Member of the Wisconsin State Assembly from the Monroe district
- In office January 3, 1870 – January 2, 1871
- Preceded by: Jesse Bennett
- Succeeded by: David D. Cheney
- In office January 6, 1868 – January 4, 1869
- Preceded by: Stephen B. Johnson
- Succeeded by: Jesse Bennett

Chairman of the Board of Supervisors of Vernon County, Wisconsin
- In office November 13, 1860 – January 1, 1862
- Preceded by: Adam Carlysle
- Succeeded by: Position abolished

Personal details
- Born: April 17, 1829 Gerry, New York, U.S.
- Died: August 24, 1899 (aged 70) Melvina, Wisconsin, U.S.
- Resting place: Melvina Cemetery, Melvina, Wisconsin
- Party: Republican
- Spouses: Amanda Melvina Ray (m. 1849; died 1866); Sarah H. Hunt (m. 1867; died 1890); Mary (Casper) (m. 1890–1899)
- Children: with Amanda Ray; Charles M. Hunt^{(b. 1848; died 1862)}; Henry William Hunt^{(b. 1853; died 1910)}; Francis Marion Hunt^{(b. 1855; died 1894)}; Earnest Hunt^{(b. 1857; died in infancy)}; Capitola A. Hunt^{(b. 1859; died 1861)}; Metella Edna Hunt^{(b. 1862; died 1881)}
- Occupation: Miller

Military service
- Allegiance: United States
- Branch/service: United States Volunteers; Union Army
- Years of service: 1862–1865
- Rank: Captain, USV
- Unit: 25th Reg. Wis. Vol. Infantry
- Battles/wars: Dakota War of 1862; American Civil War

Charles A. Hunt (April 17, 1829 – August 24, 1899) was an American miller, Republican politician, and Wisconsin pioneer. He was a key figure in the attempted removal of the Winnebago people from Wisconsin in the 1870s, and was a founder of Clinton and Melvina, Wisconsin. He was also a member of the Wisconsin State Assembly, representing Monroe County during the 1868 and 1870 sessions, and served as a Union Army officer during the American Civil War.

== Early years and settlement in Wisconsin ==
Charles A. Hunt was born April 17, 1829, in Gerry, New York. He was raised and educated there and moved west to the Wisconsin Territory in 1845. He initially settled in Grant County, and worked in a mill, but after hearing of the California Gold Rush, he went west to seek his fortune. He returned to Grant County a year later and returned to his mill, where he worked until 1855.

That year, he moved north to Vernon County, Wisconsin, then known as "Bad Ax" County. He settled in what would become the community of Bloomingdale, in what was then part of the town of Christiana. He was the first blacksmith in the settlement, and later that year purchased half ownership of a partially constructed mill, in partnership with Evan Oleson. He completed construction the mill in 1856, making it the first operating mill in the settlement. In 1857, this section became a separate town, originally called "Masterson" and later renamed Clinton. The first meeting of the new town was held at Hunt and Oleson's mill, and Hunt was elected the first chairman of the town board.

In 1857, Hunt, Oleson, and J. E. Palmer, worked to plat the settlement of Bloomingdale and established a post office there. Hunt became the second postmaster at Bloomingdale, serving until he joined the Union Army. He was elected to the Bad Ax County board of supervisors for 1857, and was subsequently re-elected for 1858, 1859, 1860, and 1861, serving as chairman for the fall session of the 1860 term and for all of the 1861 term.

== Civil War service ==
At the first war meeting in Vernon County following the start of the American Civil War, Hunt was voted to the county committee to enroll volunteers for service in the Union Army. He served in this capacity for a year, but then chose to enter the service himself and was enrolled as first lieutenant of Company K in the 25th Wisconsin Infantry Regiment.

The 25th Wisconsin Infantry mustered into federal service in September 1862. Rather than being sent to the south to fight the Confederacy, they were first sent west to Minnesota to respond to the Sioux uprising. The regiment was assigned to the Department of Dakota and split up among several communities of southern Minnesota to provide security. Hunt and his company were assigned to Winnebago, Minnesota. They remained in Minnesota through the Fall before returning to Wisconsin in December.

In February 1863, they were sent south to Kentucky for service in the western theater of the Civil War. They went on to participate in the Vicksburg Campaign and Sherman's campaigns through Georgia and the Carolinas. For much of 1864, Hunt was designated acting quartermaster of the regiment, and in the Fall of 1864 he was promoted to captain of his company. He remained in this role through the end of the war.

== Postbellum career ==
Returning from the war, Hunt sold his interests in Vernon County and moved north to Monroe County, Wisconsin. In Monroe County, he purchased 300 acres of land in the northwest corner of the town of Jefferson. He erected a mill and gathered other families to a settlement within his land, which he named "Melvina" in honor of his recently deceased wife. Melvina was on the mail route between Sparta and Viroqua, and Hunt served as postmaster at Melvina from the time of its establishment until his death in 1899.

Hunt was a staunch Republican and was elected to two terms in the Wisconsin State Assembly, representing all of Monroe County during the 1868 and 1870 sessions.

== Removal of the Winnebago people ==
The Winnebago people of Wisconsin had been induced to give up their land in treaties in the 1830s, but many communities of Winnebago had refused to comply with those treaties, despite several efforts to remove them in the 1840s. In the 1870s, at the urging of Wisconsin's governor Cadwallader C. Washburn and U.S. senator Timothy O. Howe, Congress and the United States Department of the Interior determined that another effort would be made to remove the remaining Winnebago from Wisconsin.

At the recommendation of congressman Jeremiah McLain Rusk—who had been Hunt's commanding officer in the 25th Wisconsin Infantry during the war—Hunt was appointed superintendent to organize the removal of the Winnebago. Through negotiation and payment, Hunt was able to compel some Winnebago to leave to the intended reservation, but many continued to oppose the removal plan and engaged in a series of discussions and legal maneuvers to delay and frustrate the process.

By the end of 1873, Governor Washburn was losing patience and summoned federal troops to compel the removal. In December, Hunt led a company of the 20th U.S. Infantry Regiment upon a festival of Winnebago resisters which had gathered near Portage, Wisconsin. They arrested the attendees and forced them to be deported. Over the Winter and Spring, the soldiers assisted in a campaign in western Wisconsin to arrest and deport stragglers. During the campaign, a Winnebago man attempted to shoot him, but Hunt escaped unharmed.

Hunt continued the removal operation until the remaining federal funds were spent, ending in the Summer of 1874. The Winnebago began to return almost immediately.

== Later years ==
Hunt mostly retired after the Winnebago affair, though he remained active with veterans organizations, such as the Grand Army of the Republic. He suffered a long decline in health and died in August 1899, after an illness of two years.

== Personal life and family ==
Charles Hunt married three times. His first wife was Amanda Melvina Ray, who became the namesake of Melvina, Wisconsin, after her death in 1866. Their marriage produced six children, though two died in childhood, and two others died early in adulthood.

== Electoral history ==
=== Wisconsin Assembly (1869) ===
Wisconsin Assembly, Green 2nd District Election, 1869
Party	Candidate	Votes	%	±%
General Election, November 2, 1869
Republican	Charles A. Hunt	1,107	64.03%	
Democratic	J. L. Anthony	622	35.97%	
Plurality		485	28.05%	
Total votes		1,729	100.0%	
Republican hold				

Wisconsin State Assembly
Preceded by Jesse Bennett	Member of the Wisconsin State Assembly from the Monroe district January 3, 1870 – January 2, 1871	Succeeded by David D. Cheney
Preceded by Stephen B. Johnson	Member of the Wisconsin State Assembly from the Monroe district January 6, 1868 – January 4, 1869	Succeeded by Jesse Bennett
Political offices
Preceded by Adam Carlysle	Chairman of the Board of Supervisors of Vernon County, Wisconsin; November 13, 1860 – January 1, 1862	Position abolished
