= John Morrill (Wisconsin pioneer) =

19th century American politician

Member of the Wisconsin State Assembly from the Clark–Jackson district
- In office January 3, 1870 – January 2, 1871
- Preceded by: John B. G. Baxter
- Succeeded by: George W. King

Personal details
- Born: October 26, 1826 Hartland, Maine, U.S.
- Died: November 13, 1907 (aged 81) Taylor, Wisconsin, U.S.
- Resting place: Woodlawn Cemetery, Taylor, Wisconsin
- Party: Republican
- Spouse: Lucina W. Merrill (m. 1852; died 1903)
- Children: Almund H. Morrill^{(b. 1854; died 1922)}; Le Roy E. Morrill^{(b. 1856; died 1906)}; Olive Laura^{(b. 1858; died 1933)}; Jessie B. Morrill^{(b. 1861; died 1864)}; Lowry Lincoln Morrill^{(b. 1867; died 1935)}
- Occupation: Farmer

Military service
- Allegiance: United States
- Branch/service: United States Volunteers; Union Army
- Years of service: 1865
- Rank: Corporal, USV
- Unit: 48th Reg. Wis. Vol. Infantry
- Battles/wars: American Civil War

John Morrill (October 26, 1826 – November 13, 1907) was an American farmer, Republican politician, and Wisconsin pioneer. He was a member of the Wisconsin State Assembly, representing Clark and Jackson counties during the 1870 term.

== Biography ==
John Morrill was born October 26, 1826, in Hartland, Maine. He received a common school education in Maine and left for the new western states in 1854. In 1855, he settled in the town of Springfield, in Jackson County, Wisconsin, where he purchased 160 acres of government land and established a farm. He was primarily engaged in farming his land for the rest of his working life, but supplemented his income by working in the lumber industry around Black River Falls in the winters.

In the spring of 1856, he was elected chairman of the town board, and was re-elected several times. He was elected to the county board of supervisors in 1861.

During the last year of the American Civil War, he volunteered for service in the Union Army and was enrolled as a private in the 48th Wisconsin Infantry Regiment. He served through all of 1865. The 48th Wisconsin Infantry left the state in small groups of companies. Morrill was assigned to Company H, and traveled to Olathe, Kansas, where they remained through the end of the war and into August. At that time, the regiment was assembled and assigned to guard mail and other government material through Indian territory in central and western Kansas. After marching across much of Kansas, Company H was assigned to Fort Larned for the remainder of the year. In December, Company H returned to Leavenworth, Kansas, where they were paid and mustered out of federal service.

In 1867, Morrill was appointed to fill a vacancy on the county board, by Governor Lucius Fairchild.

In 1869, he was the Republican candidate for Wisconsin State Assembly in the district comprising Jackson County and neighboring Clark County. He defeated Democrat Jacob Spaulding with 70% of the vote. He did not run for re-election in 1870.

== Personal life and family ==
John Morrill was the 6th of 11 children born to James Morrill and his wife Olive (née Hayden).

He married Lucina W. Merrill, of Greene, Maine, in 1852. They had five children together, though one died in childhood. They were married for over 50 years when she died in 1903.

John Morrill died of paralysis on November 13, 1907, at his home in Taylor, Wisconsin, where he had been confined due to illness for several years.

== Electoral history ==
=== Wisconsin Assembly (1869) ===
Wisconsin Assembly, Clark–Jackson District Election, 1869
Party	Candidate	Votes	%	±%
General Election, November 2, 1869
Republican	John Morrill	1,082	69.58%	
Democratic	Jacob Spaulding	473	30.42%	
Plurality		609	39.16%	
Total votes		1,555	100.0%	
Republican hold				

Wisconsin State Assembly
Preceded by John B. G. Baxter	Member of the Wisconsin State Assembly from the Clark–Jackson district January 3, 1870 – January 2, 1871	Succeeded by George W. King
