= Senator Downs =

Senator Downs may refer to:

- C. H. Downs (1911–1985), Louisiana State Senate
- Daniel Downs (1824–1897), Wisconsin State Senate
- Solomon W. Downs (1801–1854), U.S. Senator from Louisiana 1847 to 1853
