= Rheingrafenstein Castle =

Castle in Germany

- Burg Rheingrafenstein
- Bad Münster am Stein-Ebernburg
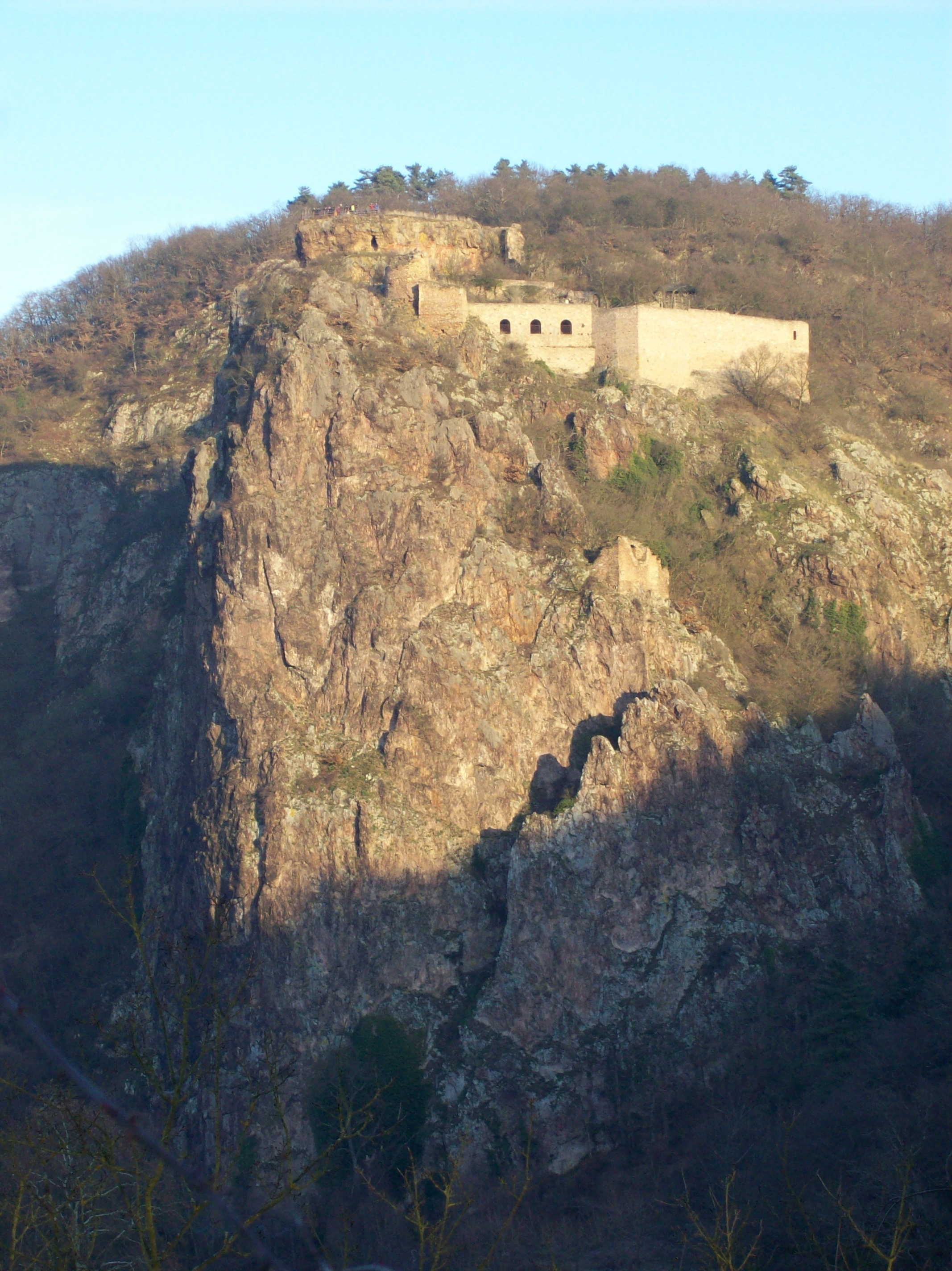
- Rheingrafenstein Castle

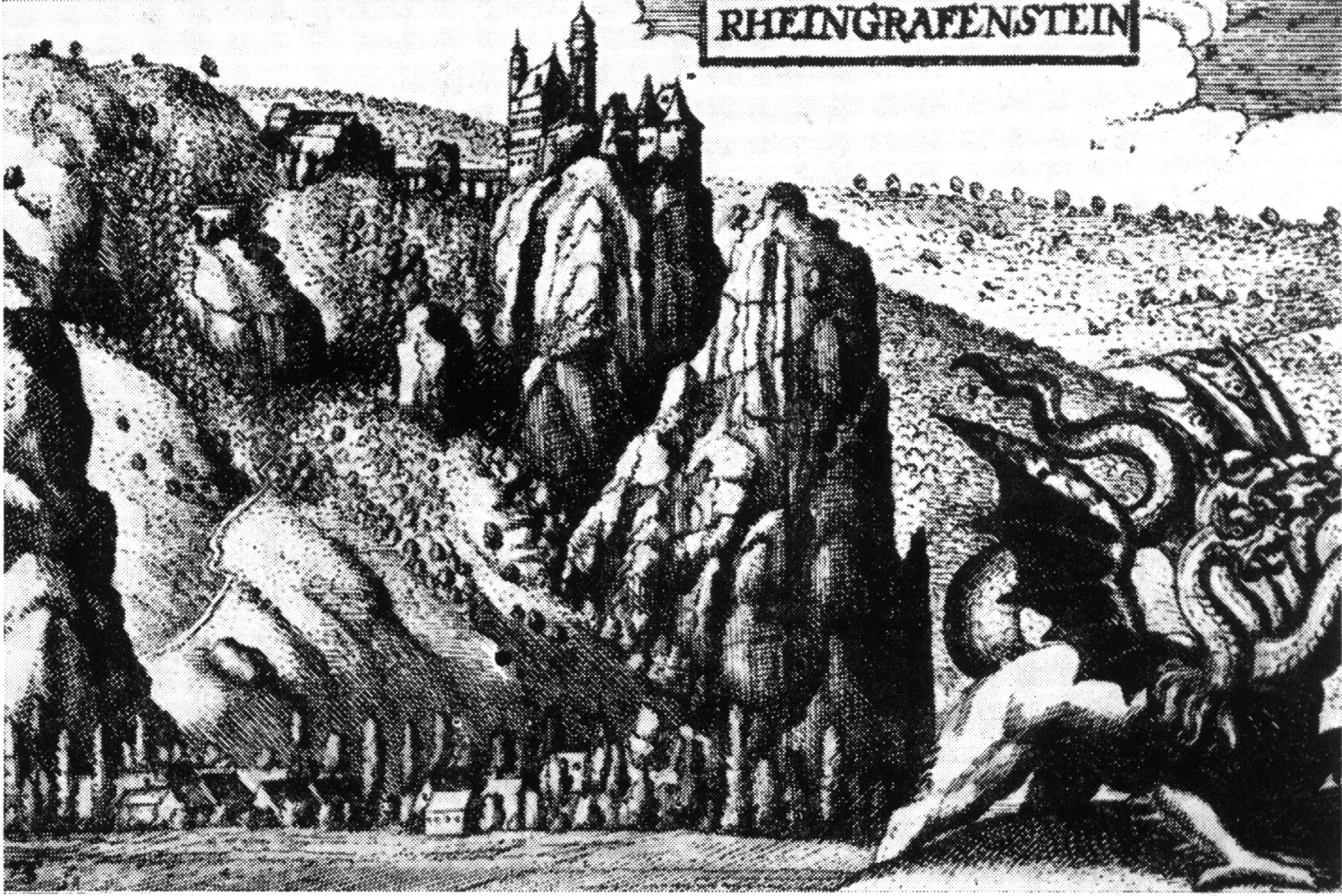
- Rheingrafenstein Castle, c. 1620

Site information
- Type: Hilltop castle
- Condition: Remains of walls and a vaulted cellar

Location
- Location within Rhineland-Palatinate Location within Germany
- Coordinates: 49°48′28″N 7°51′01″E

Site history
- Built: c. 1000-1200

Rheingrafenstein Castle is a castle on a 136-metre-high (446 ft) porphyry rock formation, the Rheingrafenstein, known as Huhinstein a thousand years, on the river Nahe, opposite Bad Münster am Stein-Ebernburg in the district Bad Kreuznach.

== History ==
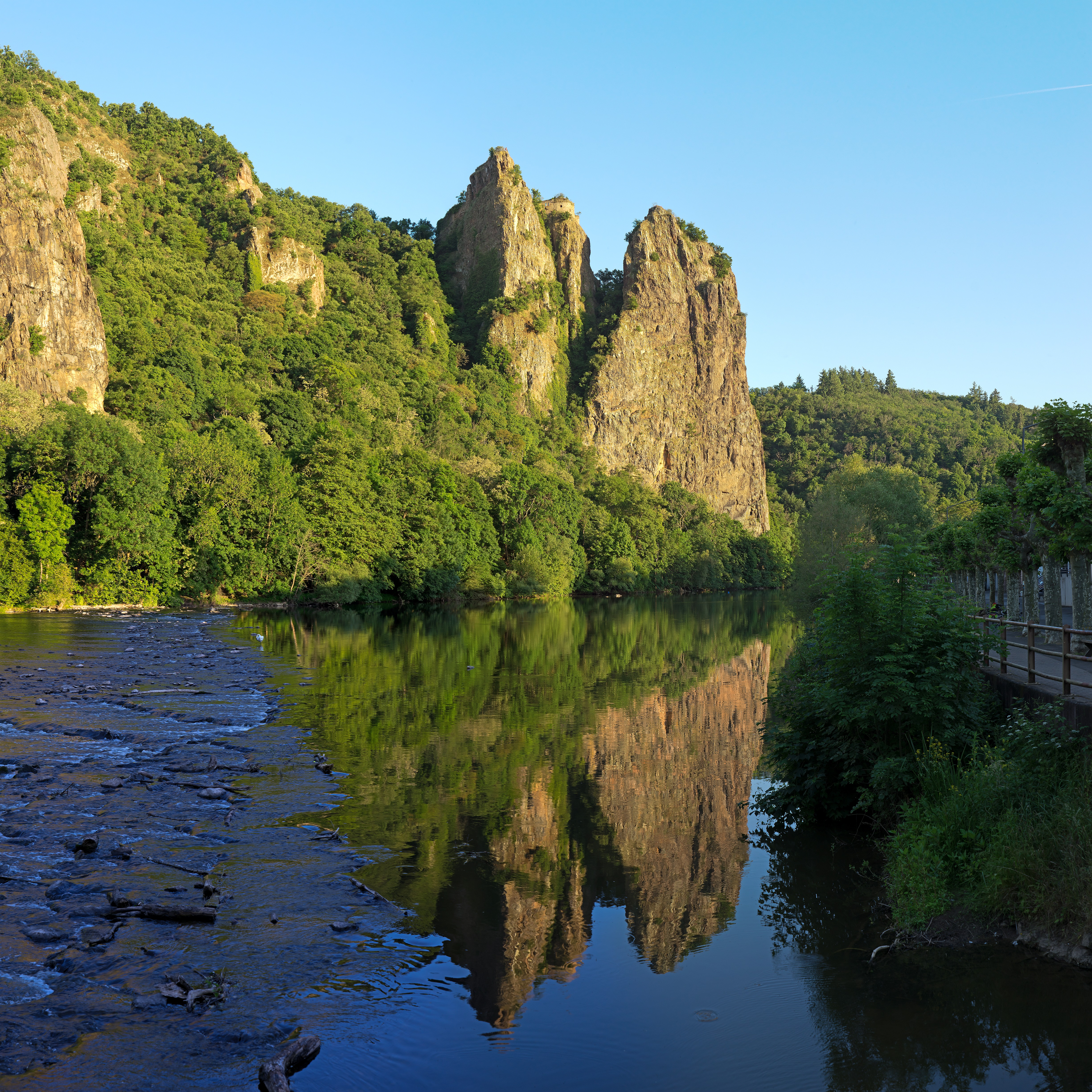
Rheingrafenstein Rock in 2025

The rock castle was probably built in the 11th or 12th century by the Counts of Nahegau of the Emichones family. It was definitely the ancestral castle of the Lords of Stein, the later Wild- and Rhinegraves, and it remained in their possession until the French Revolution. The Lords of Stein were first mentioned in the 12th century. Their relationship to the Counts of Nahegau is unclear. Rheingrafenstein Castle itself is first unambiguously mentioned in the 13th century. The Lords of Stein acquired the Rheingau in the second half of the 12th century through marriage. In 1196, Lord Wolfram of Stein began styling himself Rhinegrave. This title was later attached to his castle.

During the Thirty Years' War, the castle was captured by French and Spanish troops. In 1688, it was destroyed by general Mélac. In 1721, a salt works was built on top of the castle's ruins. The castle's last owner, the wild- and rhinegrave of Rheingrafenstein, moved his residence to Schloss Gaugrehweiler in nearby Gaugrehweiler.

The information sign at the castle reads:

The history of Rheingrafenstein Castle The castle was built in the 11th century on a rock which was then called Huhinstein. Its owners were known as the Lord of Stein. Siegfried I of Stein married Lukarids, the daughter of Count Embirch of the Rheingau and their son Wolfgang inherited the Rheingau, on the right bank of the Rhine. After the battle of Sprendlingen in 1279, Siegfried II lost his possessions of the right bank to the Archbishop of Mainz. He moved his residence here and named the rock Rheingrafenstein. In the 14th and 15th century, the Rhinegraves acquired the Wildgraviate and half the County of Salm through marriage. In 1610, they formed their own line of Rhinegraves: the Rheingrafensteinische line. During the Thirty Years' War, the castle was conquered by the Spaniards and the Swedes. During the Palatinate War of Succession, the castle was destroyed by French troops under general Mélac in 1689. In 1721, the count donated the ruins to the city, so that a salt works could be built on top of the ruins. In 1835, descendants of the Wild- and Rhinegraves of Rheingrafenstein (who had been raised to princes in the meantime), bought the ruins back from the municipality of Münster.

== Ruins ==
Parts of the enceinte, a vaulted cellar, a few steps of the former tower house, and the foundations of the former tower staircase are still standing. Another staircase leads through the rocks to a viewing platform.

On the southern slope of the rock, the ruins of the bailey Affenstein can be seen.
