= George W. Spratt =

American manufacturer and politician

George W. Spratt (January 30, 1844 – August 31, 1934) was an American manufacturer and politician.

Born in Boston, Lincolnshire, England, Spratt emigrated to the United States in 1851 and settled in Sheboygan County, Wisconsin. Spratt was a carpenter and manufacturer and lived in Sheboygan Falls, Wisconsin. During the American Civil War, Spratt served in the 48th Wisconsin Infantry Regiment. Spratt served on the Sheboygan Falls Village Board and was a Republican. In 1887 and 1901, Spratt served in the Wisconsin State Assembly. He died at his home in Sheboygan Falls, Wisconsin.
