= Melvina, Wisconsin =

- Village
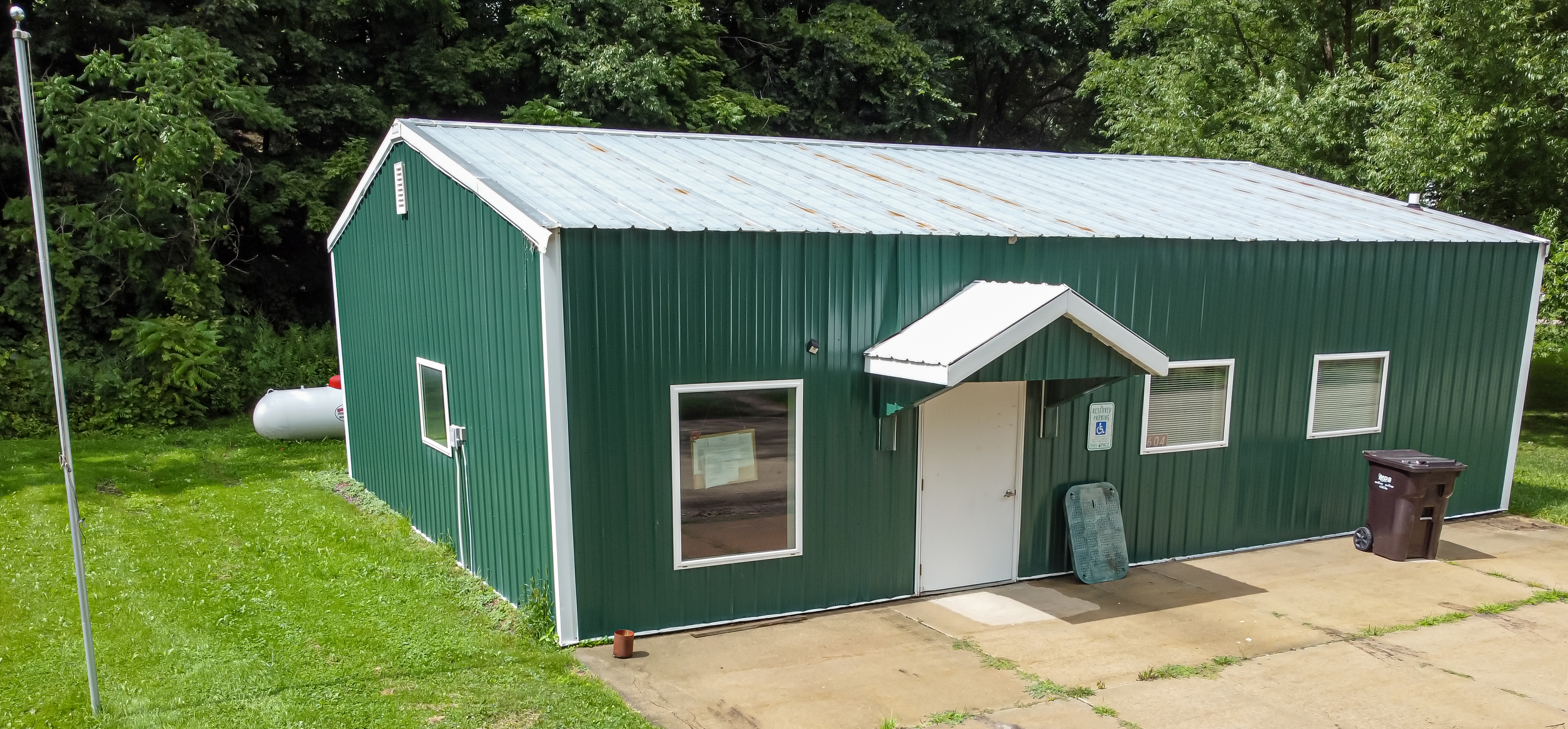
- Village hall

- Location of Melvina in Monroe County, Wisconsin.
- Coordinates: 43°48′6″N 90°46′31″W
- Country: United States
- State: Wisconsin
- County: Monroe

Area
  - Total: 0.49 sq mi (1.26 km^{2})
  - Land: 0.49 sq mi (1.26 km^{2})
  - Water: 0 sq mi (0.00 km^{2})
- Elevation: 863 ft (263 m)

Population (2020)
  - Total: 93
  - Density: 226.6/sq mi (87.48/km^{2})
- Time zone: UTC-6 (Central (CST))
  - Summer (DST): UTC-5 (CDT)
- Area code: 608
- FIPS code: 55-50800
- GNIS feature ID: 1569329

Melvina is a village in Monroe County, Wisconsin, United States. The population was 93 at the 2020 census.

== History ==
The story of Melvina began when Vernon County miller Charles A. Hunt returned from the Civil War and sold all his interests in that county. He used the funds to buy 300 acres of land in Monroe County, including the present site of the village of Melvina. He built a mill at that site and persuaded other families to come and settle there. He named the settlement "Melvina" after his recently deceased wife, Amanda Melvina Hunt (née Ray).

== Geography ==
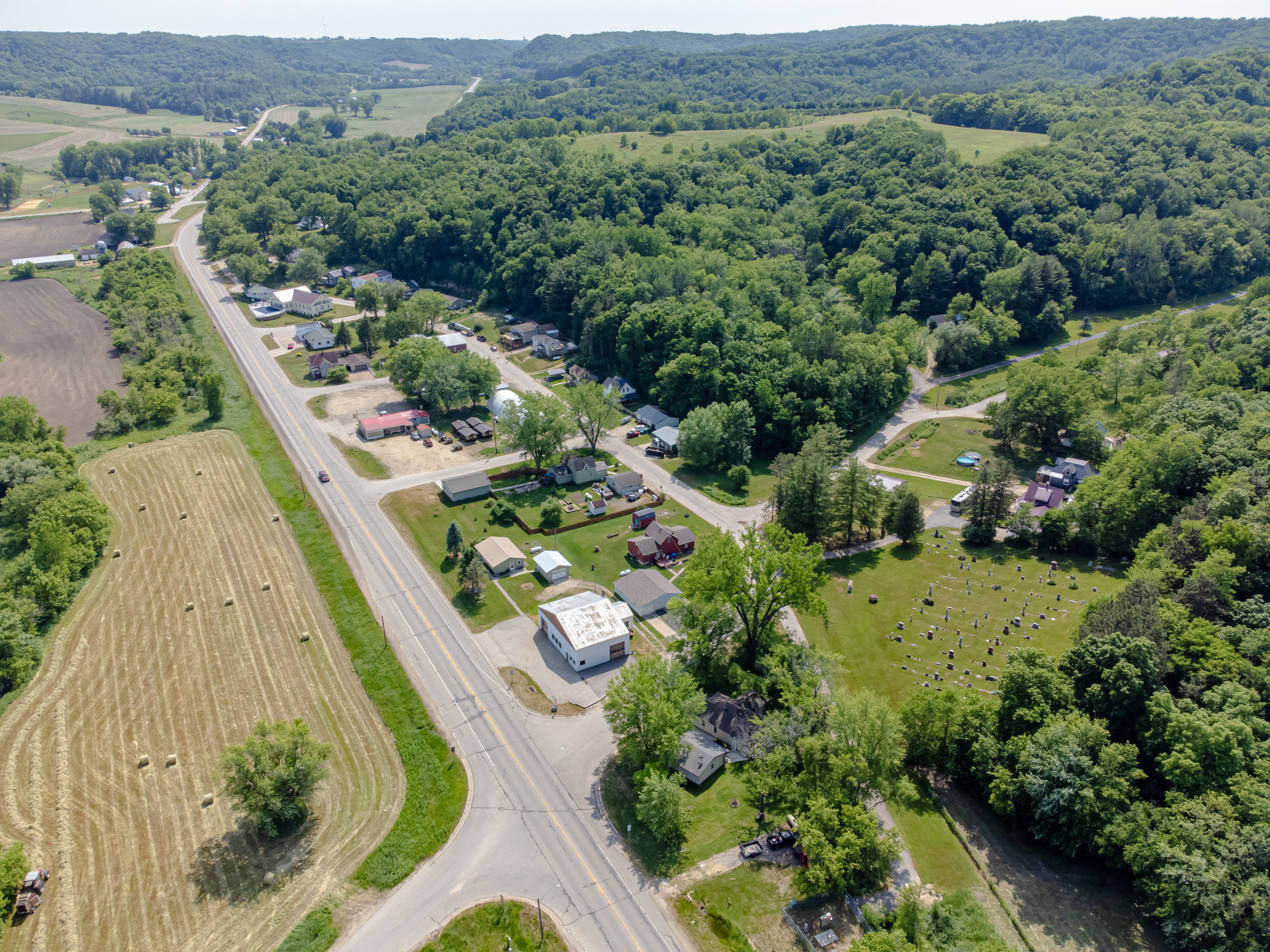

Melvina is located at 43°48′6″N 90°46′31″W (43.801747, -90.775267).

According to the United States Census Bureau, the village has a total area of 0.48 square miles (1.24 km^{2}), all land.

== Demographics ==
Historical population
Census	Pop.	Note	%±
1930	143		—
1940	135		−5.6%
1950	121		−10.4%
1960	111		−8.3%
1970	116		4.5%
1980	117		0.9%
1990	115		−1.7%
2000	93		−19.1%
2010	104		11.8%
2020	93		−10.6%
U.S. Decennial Census

=== 2010 census ===
As of the census of 2010, there were 104 people, 39 households, and 26 families living in the village. The population density was 216.7 inhabitants per square mile (83.7/km^{2}). There were 44 housing units at an average density of 91.7 per square mile (35.4/km^{2}). The racial makeup of the village was 96.2% White, 1.9% African American, and 1.9% from two or more races.

There were 39 households, of which 38.5% had children under the age of 18 living with them, 43.6% were married couples living together, 15.4% had a female householder with no husband present, 7.7% had a male householder with no wife present, and 33.3% were non-families. 33.3% of all households were made up of individuals, and 7.7% had someone living alone who was 65 years of age or older. The average household size was 2.67 and the average family size was 3.31.

The median age in the village was 29.4 years. 33.7% of residents were under the age of 18; 7.7% were between the ages of 18 and 24; 33.6% were from 25 to 44; 19.2% were from 45 to 64; and 5.8% were 65 years of age or older. The gender makeup of the village was 49.0% male and 51.0% female.

=== 2000 census ===
As of the census of 2000, there were 93 people, 38 households, and 25 families living in the village. The population density was 195.6 people per square mile (74.8/km^{2}). There were 41 housing units at an average density of 86.2 per square mile (33.0/km^{2}). The racial makeup of the village was 97.85% White, 1.08% Native American, and 1.08% from two or more races.

There were 38 households, out of which 31.6% had children under the age of 18 living with them, 47.4% were married couples living together, 10.5% had a female householder with no husband present, and 34.2% were non-families. 31.6% of all households were made up of individuals, and 10.5% had someone living alone who was 65 years of age or older. The average household size was 2.45 and the average family size was 3.12.

In the village, the population was spread out, with 33.3% under the age of 18, 5.4% from 18 to 24, 30.1% from 25 to 44, 18.3% from 45 to 64, and 12.9% who were 65 years of age or older. The median age was 35 years. For every 100 females, there were 86.0 males. For every 100 females age 18 and over, there were 87.9 males.

The median income for a household in the village was $21,250, and the median income for a family was $28,750. Males had a median income of $21,563 versus $18,281 for females. The per capita income for the village was $11,791. There were 12.5% of families and 17.5% of the population living below the poverty line, including 21.2% of under eighteens and 18.2% of those over 64.
