= Schloss Gaugrehweiler =

Former palace of the counts of Salm-Rheingrafenstein-Gaugrehweiler

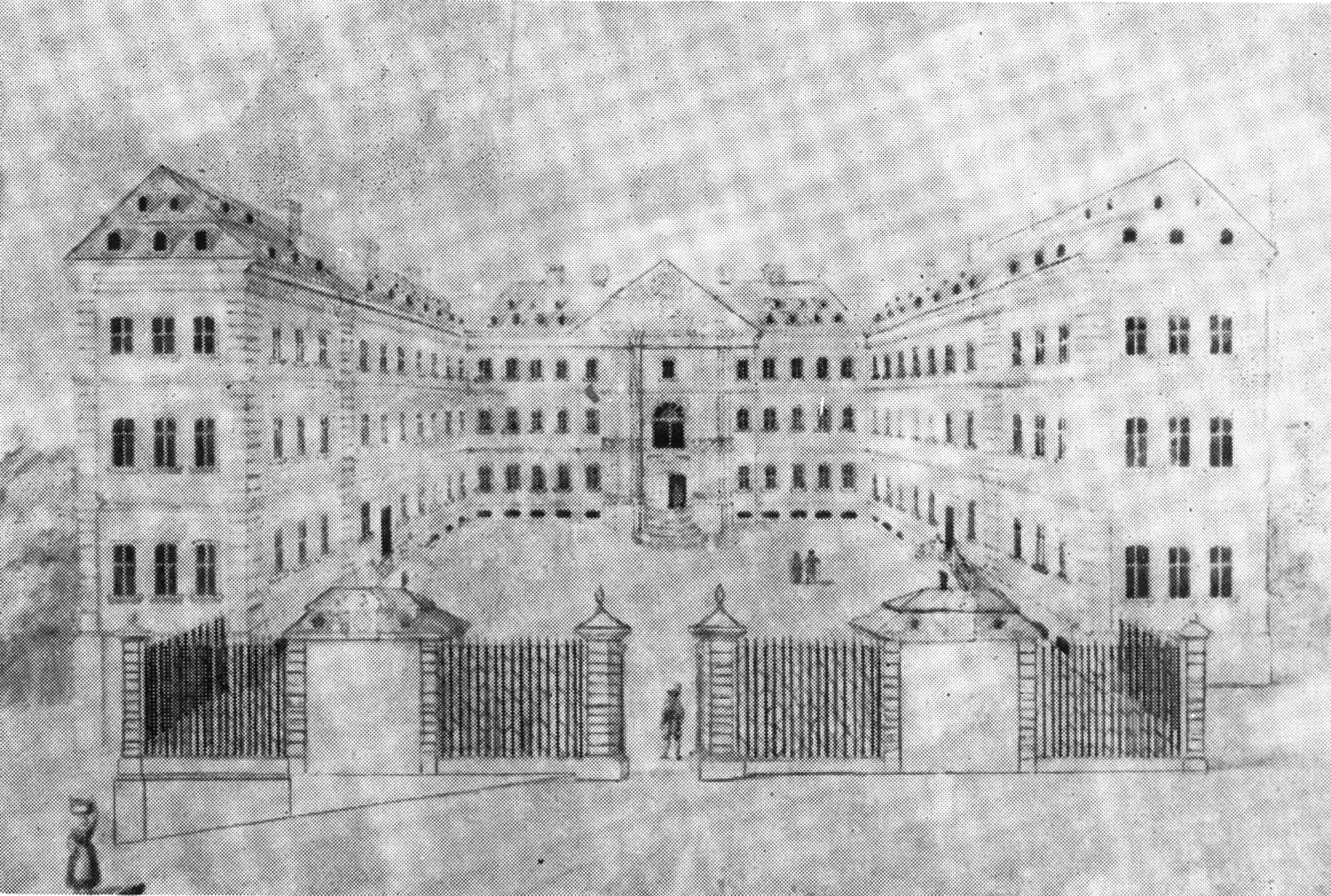
Schloss Gaugrehweiler (18th century)

Gaugrehweiler Palace (German: Schloss Gaugrehweiler) (also known as the Rheingräfliches Schloss, or Wild- and Rhinegravial Palace, or Schloss Grehweiler) was a Rococo-style residential palace in the village of Gaugrehweiler, in the Donnersbergkreis district of Rhineland-Palatinate, Germany. The palace was commissioned by Count Carl Magnus of Rheingrafenstein and constructed between 1749 and 1756. It was demolished in the 1790s, following the French conquest of the region. Little of the palace survives above ground today, though archaeological and architectural remnants remain in the village center.

== Location and present remains ==
The palace stood next to the parish church, in the area of today's Neustraße 1 and Hauptstraße 26/28, below the street known as Zum Schlossberg.

Today, little of the palace survives above ground. According to the listing of cultural monuments (Kulturdenkmäler) for the Donnersbergkreis, surviving elements include parts of the courtyard's paving, the vaulted cellars of the central wing and one side wing, sections of the plinth wall, and several cavaliers' houses (outbuildings for court officials) survive.

The cellars are freely accessible to visitors.

== History ==
=== The Wild- and Rhinegraves of Rheingrafenstein ===
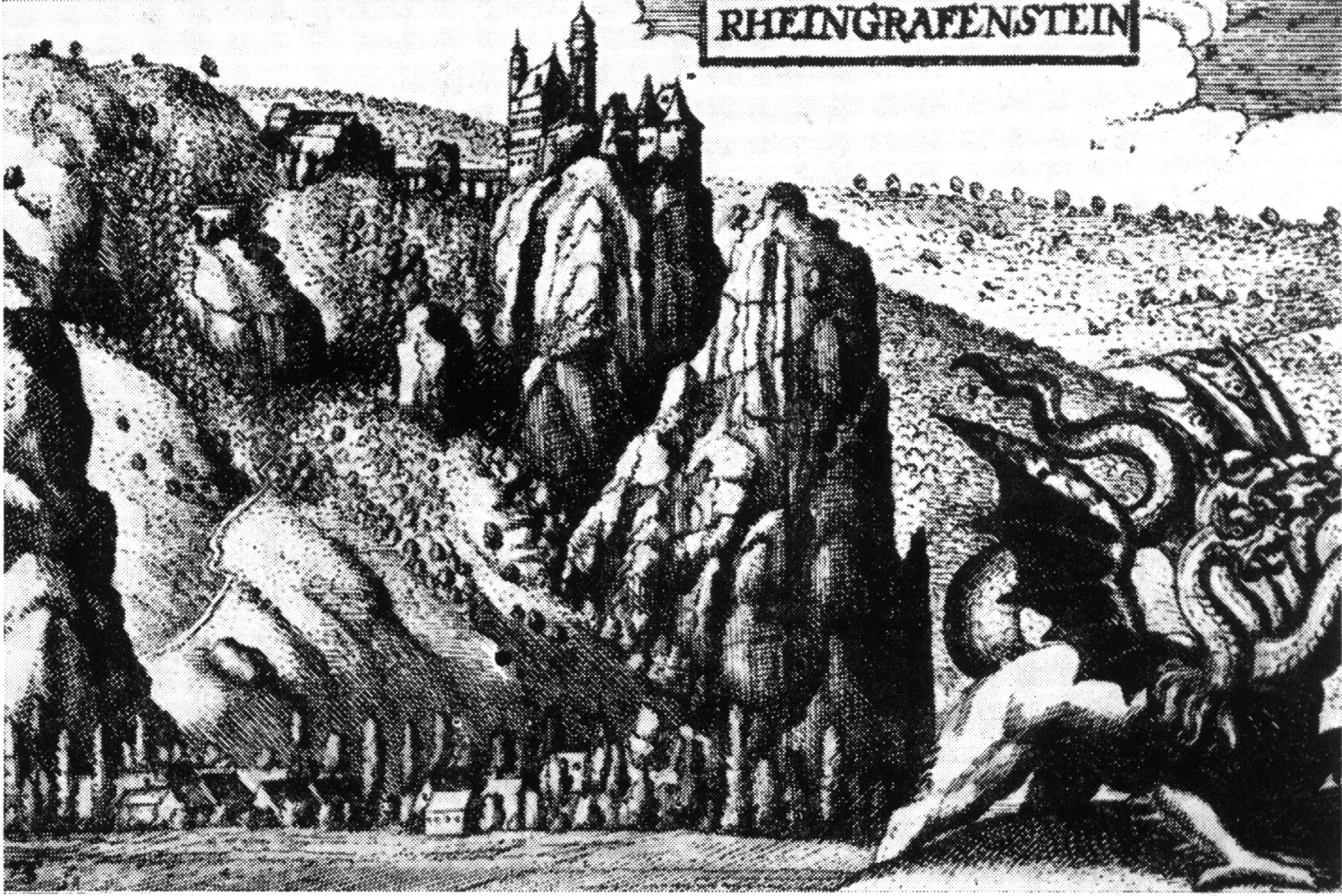
Rheingrafenstein Castle high on a rock above the Nahe River(1620)

The Rhinegraves were a German comital dynasty descended from the Emichones family, who had held county rights in the Rheingau since the 11th century. Through marriage the title passed to the Lords "vom Stein," whose ancestral seat was the Rheingrafenstein castle on the Nahe. In 1409 this line inherited the territory of the extinct Wildgraves of Dhaun and Kyrburg and thereafter styled itself Wild- and Rhinegraves (German: Wild- und Rheingrafen). In 1475, the family also inherited half of the County of Salm in the Vosges through the marriage of Rhinegrave Johann V to the heiress Johannetta, and from then on additionally styled itself Counts of Salm (German: Grafen zu Salm). When Johann VI, the last holder of the undivided inheritance, died in 1499, his sons partitioned the combined territories between 1515 and 1520, splitting the house of Salm into several branches: Salm, Grumbach, Dhaun, and Kyrburg.

The Salm branch was raised to hereditary Imperial Prince in 1623 and, after its original line died out in 1738, passed by inheritance to a collateral branch that took the name Salm-Salm in 1739; this is the princely family that later held Anholt Castle in Westphalia. The Grumbach line formed an independent Rhinegravial branch in 1610 and was elevated to Prussian princely rank only in 1816, as Salm-Horstmar.

In 1668, the Wild- and Rhinegraviate of Rheingrafenstein split off the Grumbach line (and was also known as the Salm-Grumbach-Stein branch). Their main seat at Rheingrafenstein was destroyed by French troops under general Mélac during the War of the Palatine Succession in 1688. The castle was not restored and count Friedrich Wilhelm (1644 – 1706) relocated his residence to nearby Gaugrehweiler.

=== Modest court at start ===
In the Middle Ages, there was a castle in Gaugrehweiler, whose location is no longer known but which may have stood on or near the later palace site. It is also not clear if the castle still existed in 1689. Both count Friedrich Wilhelm and his son, count Johann Karl Ludwig (1686 – 1740) maintained a comparatively modest court in Gaugrehweiler. They focused on establishing the village as the new seat of the county, which consisted of eight villages in today’s Rheinhessen/ Pfalz region with roughly 20,000 subjects. The county also had a seat in the Imperial Diet.

=== Carl Magnus von Rheingrafenstein ===
Coat of Armour of the counts of Salm-Rheingrafenstein in Gaugrehweiler

==== Childhood and military service ====
Carl Magnus von Rheingrafenstein (1718 – 1793) was the eldest of ten children of count Johann Karl Ludwig and Sophie Magdalene zu Leiningen (1691–1727), though only four of his siblings survived past age fourteen — between his eighth and tenth years alone, he lost three siblings in quick succession. He grew up at his father’s court in Gaugrehweiler. The contrast between his father's modest court and the 'princely splendor' in which his maternal uncle, Count Christian Karl von Leiningen-Heidesheim, resided, likely had a formative influence on the young count.

Around age 15, Carl Magnus was sent into French military service for officer training. According to his biographer Friedrich Christian Laukhard, he and his brother Ludwig were assigned as young officers to a campaign against Emperor Charles VI, likely the War of the Polish Succession, placing this around 1733–1735. He served in the Régiment Royal Allemand and, as was customary, purchased command of his own company. Before seeing battle, however, he left for a cure at the spa town of Spa. When the campaign ended he returned to his regiment but was so negligent in his duties that his commanding officer, Field Marshal Maurice de Saxe (1696 – 1750), moved to have him dishonorably discharged — a disgrace averted only when his father intervened, promising a "delivery of recruits" to placate the field marshal. Villages across the county were then forced to supply soldiers for the Ancien Régime army, in some cases through violent conscription. Carl Magnus himself was furloughed in exchange for the Gaugrehweiler recruits but remained formally enlisted, even receiving a promotion to Mestre de camp in absentia in 1749, and — despite his later imprisonment — a further promotion to Maréchal de camp in old age. He drew a French army pension for the rest of his life.

==== Construction of the palace ====
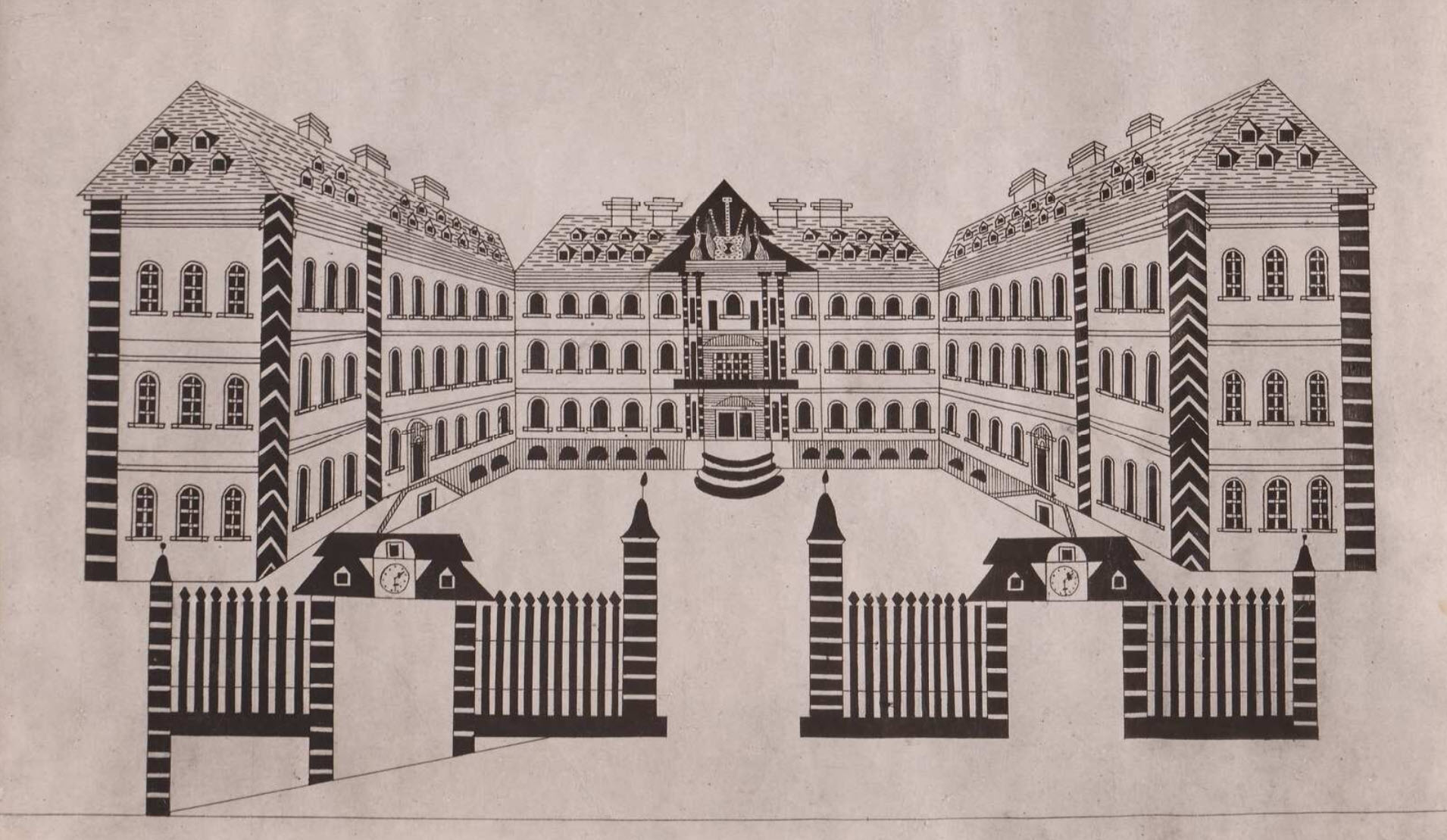
Drawing of Schloss Gaugrehweiler (collection Pfalzbibliothek Kaiserslautern)

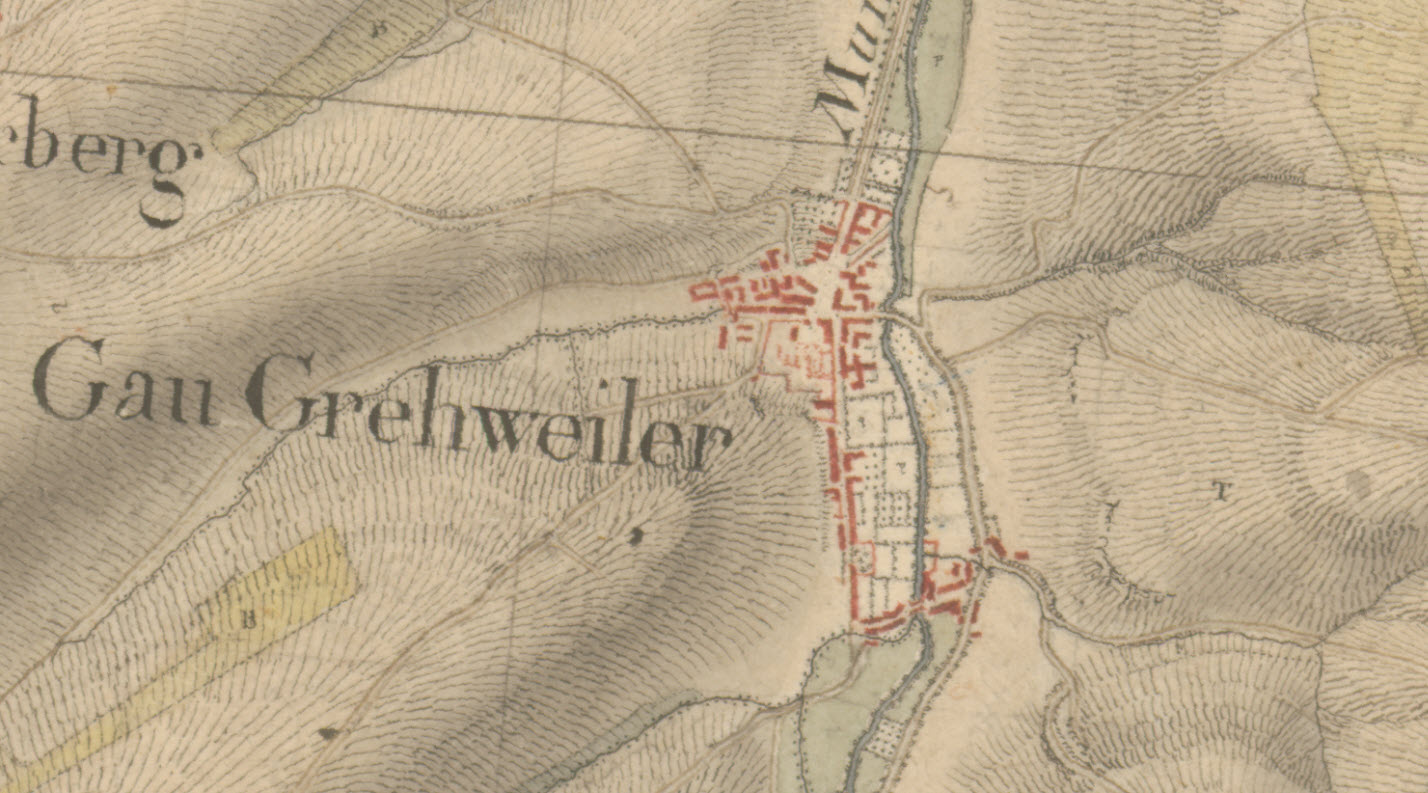
Map of Gaugrehweiler around 1803-1820 - The palace was located in the middle of the village south of the market palace where the map shows the remains of the complex

His father died in 1740, and Carl Magnus took over rule of the county of Gaugrehweiler at the age of 22.

Although his territory was not among the largest, he was determined not to fall behind the absolutist rulers of his day: From 1748 he demolished his father's modest court and commissioned a new residential palace on the site at Gaugrehweiler. Construction ran from 1749 to 1756, to designs by the architect Johann Leonhard Reichel. The building was reportedly conceived with the Palace of Versailles as a stylistic model, and took the form of a three-story, three-winged late-Baroque-styrle complex with lavish Rococo interior decoration.

Alongside the main palace building, an extensive courtly complex was developed, including a court church (German: Hofkirche), service and administrative buildings, housing for court officials, an orangery, a pleasure house (German: Lusthaus), a pheasantry, a menagerie (German: Tiergarten), and stables (German: Marstall) large enough to house 120 horses. At the same time, he maintained an extravagant court with courtiers and ladies-in-waiting, hussars, Hajduks, Black attendants, and court musicians, and took hatters, goldsmiths, and the sculptor Peter Anton von Verschaffelt into his service.

==== Debt and fraud, imprisonment and decline ====
While he constructed and maintained his opulent court, Carl Magnus ran up heavy debts: construction alone consumed 180,000 guilders against his county revenues of only about 60,000. Despite marrying a wealthy countess (Joaneta Luise zu Salm-Püttlingen) partly for financial relief, this did not work out as he had hoped for.

To fund the shortfall, he ran a fake mining-stock scheme, founded a predatory state mortgage bank charging illegal interest rates to seize subjects' property, and forged signatures to take out debt in his villages' names without their knowledge. When creditors sued the affected villages at the Reichskammergericht, the villages appealed to Elector Karl Theodor, who forwarded the case to Emperor Joseph II in Vienna. An imperial investigating commission cleared the villages and confirmed Carl Magnus as the true debtor; he was confined to a debtors' prison at the castle of Königstein im Taunus in 1775. He regained his freedom in 1783, following appeals from his relatives, and spent his final decade alone at Gaugrehweiler with only one servant and one horse, his wife having already died. Having no surviving sons, he signed away all rights to his cousin Karl Ludwig von Grumbach in exchange for lifetime residency and a pension — a succession plan (via his daughter's marriage into the Grumbach line) that ultimately failed when that marriage stayed childless, ending the Gaugrehweiler line entirely.

==== Other ====
Carl Magnus is also remembered for early road-building in the county and a 1754 legal code, and has been the subject of a satirical 1798 biography, an 1806 stage comedy, and a 1985 German TV series inspired by his court.

=== Destruction ===
During the French revolutionary wars in the early 1790s, the palace was plundered and condemned for demolition. Its remaining structure and materials were dismantled, and in 1805 the ruins were sold at auction for 7,000 guilders to three private individuals, with stone reused in various local building projects.

== Architecture ==
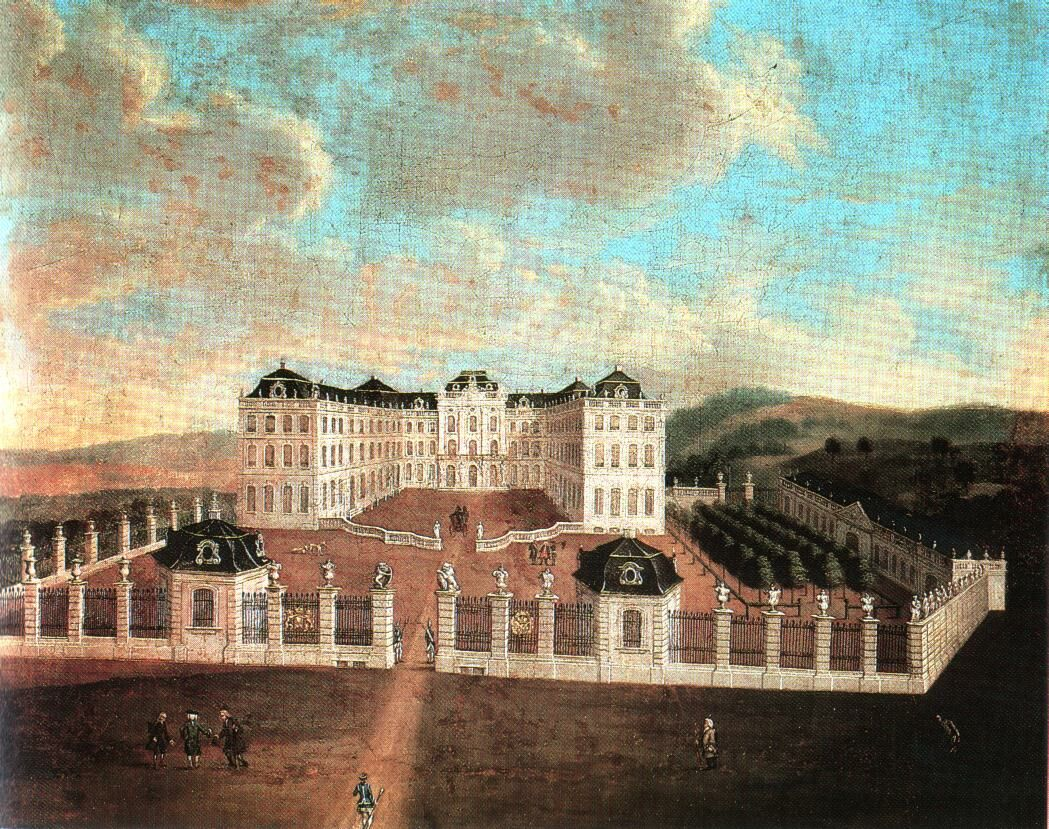
Schloss Saarbrücken in 1748, its design seems to have influenced Schloss Gaugrehweiler

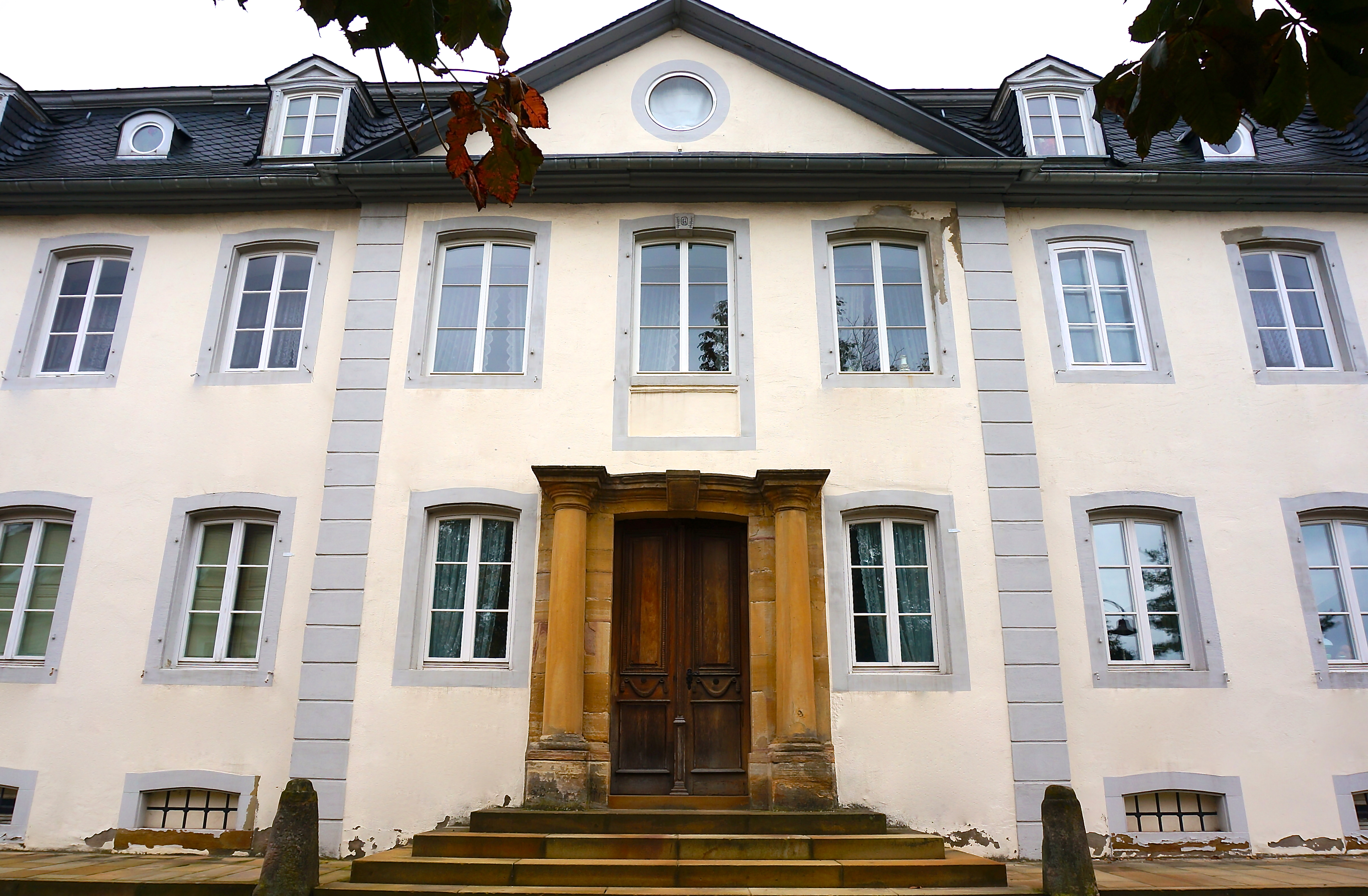
Schloss Wendelsheim, a Baroque manor house that Reichel also designed for Carl Magnus, still survives today

Surviving design drawings by Johann Leonhard Reichel from 1747 show that the palace was planned as a horseshoe-shaped complex, which seems to have been influenced by the layout of nearby Schloss Saarbrücken, then being newly built by Friedrich Joachim Stengel for William Henry, Prince of Nassau-Saarbrücken. The design comprised a corps de logis with a central projecting bay (avant-corps) as the main range, flanked by two lower, symmetrical side wings.

What was actually completed before construction stopped remains unclear, but the corps de logis and the right side wing appear to have been finished. A contemporary drawing held at the Historical Museum of the Palatinate conveys a further impression of the complex as built: a typical Baroque palace of three storeys with a cour d'honneur, its central wing comprising 13 window bays, three of them set within a central avant-corps crowned by a triangular pediment, and symmetrical side wings of 10 bays each. Facing the street stood a fence, probably of wrought iron, with two gatekeeper's lodges.

Little is otherwise known of the architect Johann Leonhard Reichel, who held the position of court architect (Hofarchitekt) to Carl Magnus. Besides his 1747 designs for the Gaugrehweiler palace, he is also credited with the count's manor house at Wendelsheim, built in 1758 as a two-storey, nine-bay Baroque building with corner pilasters and a mansard hip roof.

The contemporary Laukhard describes the complex as follows: "This building truly did credit to its architect, and one would hardly find any other palace beyond the Rhine that could even remotely be compared to it. Even the residential palaces of the Landgrave of Hesse-Darmstadt and of the Elector of Mainz fell far short of it in elegance.

== Literature ==
- Drescher, Pfr. (1936). "Gaugrehweiler (Grehweiler), die Herrschaft unter den letzten drei Rheingrafen". Nordpfälzer Geschichtsverein - Beiträge zur Heimatgeschichte (NpfGV) (in German). 16. Rockenhausen: Nordpfälzer Geschichtsverein: 25–31.
- Zink, Albert (1953). "Die Grundsteinlegung des Schlosses zu Gaugrehweiler". Nordpfälzer Geschichtsverein - Beiträge zur Heimatgeschichte (NpfGV) (in German). 33. Rockenhausen: Nordpfälzer Geschichtsverein: 37–39.
- Zimmermann, Walter (1957). "Die ehemaligen Schlossbauten der Wild- und Rheingrafen zu Wörrstadt, Gaugrehweiler und Kirn". In Engel, Josef; Klinkenberg, Hans M. (eds.). Aus Mittelalter und Neuzeit. Gerhard Kallen zum 70. Geburtstag (in German). Bonn. pp. 337–350.
- Hellriegel, R. (1960). "Gaugrehweiler und der Rheingraf Carl Magnus". Der junge Geschichtsfreund (in German). Rockenhausen: Nordpfälzer Geschichtsverein: 3.
- Medding, Wolfgang (1962). Burgen und Schlösser in der Pfalz und an der Saar (in German). Frankfurt am Main. p. 84. ISBN 3-927754-48-X.
- Hässel, H. (1968). "Gaugrehweiler, eine untergegangene Fürstenresidenz in der Nordpfalz". Nordpfälzer Geschichtsverein - Beiträge zur Heimatgeschichte (NpfGV) (in German). 48. Rockenhausen: Nordpfälzer Geschichtsverein: 33–35.
- Burghardt, Paul (1972). "Aus der Residenzvergangenheit von Gaugrehweiler". Nordpfälzer Geschichtsverein - Beiträge zur Heimatgeschichte (NpfGV) (in German). 52. Rockenhausen: Nordpfälzer Geschichtsverein: 30–34.
- Dhom, Emil (1983). Gaugrehweiler und sein Rheingrafen-Schloss. Eine kleine Ortsgeschichte (in German). Imsweiler.
- Röder, Ernst (1984). "Wild- und Rheingrafenschloss Gaugrehweiler". Burgen Schlösser Klöster Nordpfalz (in German). p. 42.
- Kremb, K. (1989). "Warum Schlösser in Kirchheimbolanden und Gaugrehweiler zerstört wurden". Der junge Geschichtsfreund (in German). Rockenhausen: Nordpfälzer Geschichtsverein: 2.
- Schitter, W. (1993). "Gaugrehweiler, Rheingräfliche Residenz (Rundgang)". Nordpfälzer Geschichtsverein - Beiträge zur Heimatgeschichte (NpfGV) (in German). 73. Rockenhausen: Nordpfälzer Geschichtsverein: 47–48.
- Keddigkeit, Jürgen; Thon, Alexander; Übel, Rolf (2002). Pfälzisches Burgenlexikon. Band 2, F-H (in German). Kaiserslautern: Institut für pfälzische Geschichte und Volkskunde. pp. 170–171. ISBN 3-927754-48-X.
- Irsigler, Franz (2010). "Rheingraf Carl Magnus von Grehweiler – Ein hochadliger Verschwender des 18. Jahrhunderts". In Hergenröder, Curt Wolfgang (ed.). Gläubiger, Schuldner, Arme Netzwerke und die Rolle des Vertrauens (in German). Wiesbaden: VS Verlag für Sozialwissenschaften Springer Fachmedien Wiesbaden GmbH. pp. 71–81. ISBN 978-3-531-17190-6.
