= Alexander Bailey (Wisconsin politician) =

19th-century American educator, farmer, and postmaster

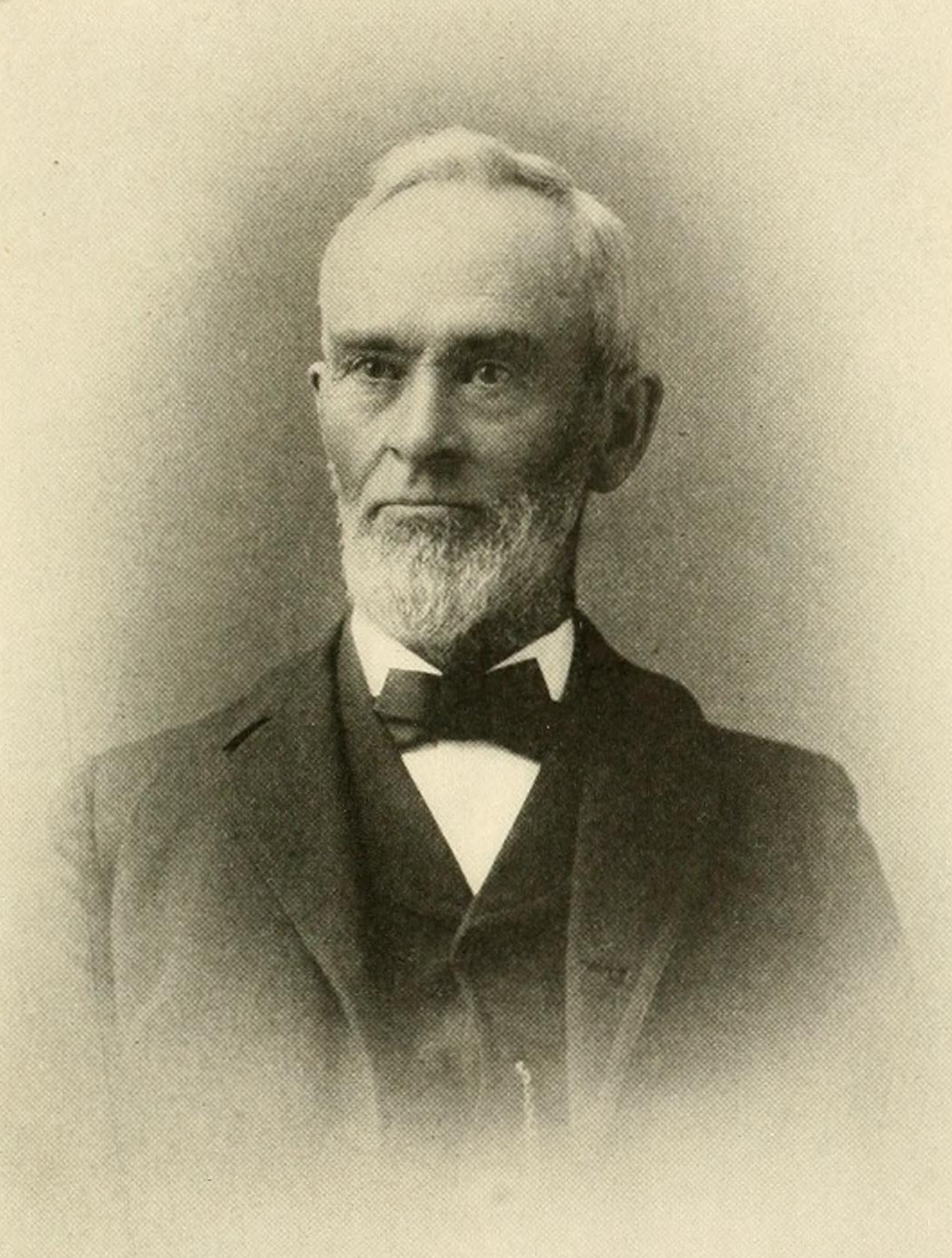

Member of the Wisconsin State Assembly from the Kenosha district
- In office January 1, 1870 – January 1, 1871
- Preceded by: Samuel E. Tarbell
- Succeeded by: Jonas W. Rhodes

Personal details
- Born: June 26, 1824 Lorraine, New York, US
- Died: May 28, 1909 (aged 84) Salem, Wisconsin, US
- Resting place: Liberty Cemetery, Liberty Corners, Wisconsin
- Party: Republican
- Spouse: Betsey L. Haws (m. 1843; died 1891)
- Children: 7
- Occupation: farmer, teacher

Alexander Bailey (June 26, 1824 – May 28, 1909) was an American farmer, educator, and pioneer settler of Kenosha County, Wisconsin. He served one term in the Wisconsin State Assembly as a Republican during the 1870 term.

== Biography ==
Alexander Bailey was born in Lorraine, New York, on June 26, 1824, the youngest of seven children born to George and Olive (Kasson) Bailey. He attended public schools until he was thirteen, when he was enrolled in the Adams Seminary. He graduated when he was seventeen and taught school for two years.

In 1843, Bailey married and moved west to Milwaukee, Wisconsin Territory, arriving in October of that year. He left his wife at Milwaukee and traveled by foot to find a location for a homestead. He walked all the way to what is now Kenosha County, finally purchasing a 160-acre (65 ha) plot of land from the United States at a price of $1.25 per acre, in what was then known as Section 33 of Brighton Township, Racine County. He cultivated his land in the summer and taught school in the winter for fourteen years. He was named town constable for 1844–45 and served as tax assessor for 1850–51.

In 1856, he moved to a 145-acre (59 ha) lot in the neighboring community of Salem (now Salem Lakes). He built the first permanent building in the settlement, a store that he rented to Shuyler Benson, which became a staple of local commerce for many years. Bailey was named superintendent of Salem schools in 1858. In 1859, he was named the Salem station agent for the Chicago and Northwestern Railroad Company, a job he held until 1889. In 1860, he was also appointed postmaster for the town, remaining in that role until the administration of Grover Cleveland. He was elected town treasurer from 1862 to 1869, and, in 1869 he was elected on the Republican ticket to represent Kenosha County in the 1870 session of the Wisconsin State Assembly.

He died on May 28, 1909, at age 84, and was buried at Liberty Cemetery alongside his wife, who died nearly 18 years earlier. He was a staunch Republican and an advocate of prohibition.

== Personal life and family ==
Bailey married Betsey L. Haws on July 16, 1843, just before he left for Wisconsin. They had seven children before her death in 1891. Bailey was regarded as a man of great humor and good conversation.

Wisconsin State Assembly
Preceded by Samuel E. Tarbell	Member of the Wisconsin State Assembly from the Kenosha district January 3, 1870 – January 2, 1871	Succeeded by Jonas W. Rhodes
