= St. Mary's, Wisconsin =

- Unincorporated community
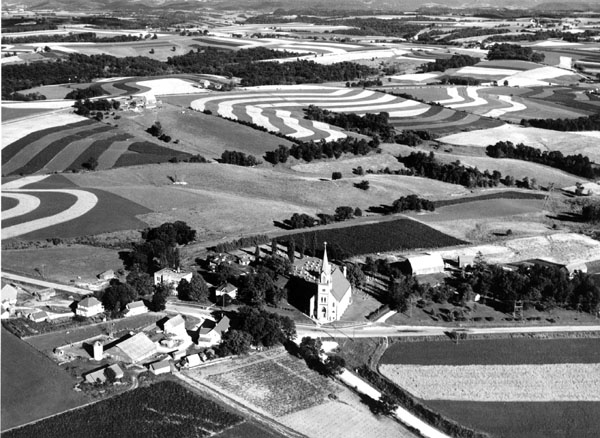
- 1957 aerial view of St. Mary's

- Location within Wisconsin Location within the United States
- Coordinates: 43°47′53″N 90°41′14″W
- Country: United States
- State: Wisconsin
- County: Monroe
- Elevation: 1,371 ft (418 m)
- Time zone: UTC-6 (Central (CST))
  - Summer (DST): UTC-5 (CDT)
- Area code: 608
- GNIS feature ID: 1577807

St. Mary's (also known as St. Mary's Ridge) is an unincorporated community in the town of Jefferson in Monroe County, Wisconsin, United States.

== History ==
St. Mary's was first settled in 1856 by families who had immigrated to America from Stommeln, northwest of Cologne, North Rhine-Westphalia, Germany. Those families thrived and branched-out through emigration to other States – notably to: Nebraska, South Dakota, Iowa, Missouri, California, and other Wisconsin counties. In 2007, a 500-page book was published (privately) by the "St. Mary's Ridge Heritage Project," Cashton, Wisconsin, entitled: "St. Mary's Ridge Heritage – Histories of Our Pioneers." A second, revised edition is planned (circa 2009). Photos of St. Mary's were once selected for use within an official White House pamphlet, as "one of America's most beautiful places," by former First Lady, Lady Bird Johnson wife of former United States President Lyndon B. Johnson.
