= Merton Herrick =

American politician

Merton W. Herrick (November 19, 1834 – March 24, 1907) was a member of the Wisconsin State Assembly.

== Biography ==
Herrick was born on November 19, 1834, in Orleans County, New York. He attended Genesee Wesleyan Seminary before moving to Hammond, Wisconsin, in 1857.

On March 23, 1859, Herrick married Lois E. Willard. They had five children. During the American Civil War, Herrick enlisted with the 13th Wisconsin Volunteer Infantry Regiment. Later, he was commissioned an officer with the 48th Wisconsin Volunteer Infantry Regiment by Governor James T. Lewis. Herrick died on March 24, 1907. He was a member of the Methodist Episcopal Church.

== Political career ==
Herrick was a member of the Assembly in 1881. Previously, he had been Treasurer of St. Croix County, Wisconsin, from 1867 to 1872 and a member of the St. Croix County Board of Supervisors.

== See also ==
- The Political Graveyard
