= 48th Wisconsin Infantry Regiment =

Union Army infantry regiment

- Flag of Wisconsin
- Active: February 1865 – March 24, 1866
- Country: United States
- Allegiance: Union
- Branch: Infantry
- Size: Regiment
- Engagements: American Civil War

Commanders
- Colonel: Uri B. Pearsall
- Lt. Colonel: Henry B. Shears

The 48th Wisconsin Infantry Regiment was a volunteer infantry regiment that served in the Union Army during the American Civil War.

== Service ==
The 48th Wisconsin was organized at Milwaukee, Wisconsin, and mustered into Federal service in February and March 1865. It was organized under the supervision of Lieutenant Colonel Henry B. Shears, Colonel Uri B. Pearsall being at the time in service as lieutenant colonel of a colored regiment.

The regiment left the state and moved to St. Louis, Missouri on March 22, and from April 1-13, the regiment moved to Warrenton and to Paola, Kansas.

The regiment was mustered out on March 24, 1866, at Fort Leavenworth, Kansas.

== Casualties ==
The 48th Wisconsin suffered 16 enlisted men who died of disease, for a total of 16 fatalities.

== Commanders ==
- Colonel Uri B. Pearsall (January 26, 1865 – December 30, 1865) previously served as lieutenant colonel, 99th United States Colored Infantry Regiment. Received an honorary brevet to brigadier general.
- Lieutenant Colonel Harry B. Shears (December 30, 1865 – March 24, 1866) commanded the regiment after Pearsall mustered out. Designated for promotion to colonel but never mustered. Previously served as captain of Co. B, 39th Wisconsin Infantry Regiment.

== Notable people ==
- Melancthon J. Briggs was 2nd lieutenant of Co. A. Previously, he had served as sergeant in Co. H, 17th Wisconsin Infantry Regiment. After the war he became a Wisconsin state legislator.
- Cyrus M. Butt, major, was designated for promotion to lieutenant colonel but was never mustered at that rank. Earlier in the war, he had served as first lieutenant and later captain of Co. A, 25th Wisconsin Infantry Regiment. After the war he served in the Wisconsin state senator.
- Sylvester J. Conklin was quartermaster of the regiment. After the war he became a Wisconsin state legislator and adjutant general of South Dakota.
- Merton W. Herrick was 2nd lieutenant and later 1st lieutenant in Co. K. Previously, he had served as first sergeant in Co. A, 30th Wisconsin Infantry Regiment. After the war he became a Wisconsin state legislator.
- John Morrill was a private and later corporal in Co. H. After the war he became a Wisconsin state legislator.
- Henry Clay Sloan was 1st lieutenant of Co. I. Earlier in the war he was enlisted in Co. D, 6th Wisconsin Infantry Regiment. After the war, he remained in the regular army 4th U.S. Infantry Regiment and later served as a Wisconsin state legislator.
- George W. Spratt was enlisted in Co. F, rising to the rank of sergeant. After the war he became a Wisconsin state legislator.
- Hobart Stocking was captain of Co. G. After the war he became a Wisconsin state legislator.

== See also ==
- List of Wisconsin Civil War units
- Wisconsin in the American Civil War
