= Melancthon J. Briggs =

American politician

Melancthon J. Briggs (March 31, 1846 – March 3, 1923) was an American lawyer and politician.

Born in Kalamazoo, Michigan, Briggs served in the 48th Wisconsin Volunteer Infantry Regiment during the American Civil War. He studied law and was admitted to the Wisconsin bar. He settled in Dodgeville, Wisconsin and practiced law. He served as postmaster for Dodgeville, Wisconsin and as district attorney for Iowa County, Wisconsin. In 1881, Briggs served in the Wisconsin State Assembly and was a Democrat. Briggs died in a hospital in Dodgeville, Wisconsin.
