= F. A. Zautcke =

American politician

Frederick A. Zautcke was an American politician. He was a member of the Wisconsin State Assembly during the 1870 and 1876 sessions. A Republican, he represented the 10th District of Milwaukee County, Wisconsin. Zautcke was born on July 25, 1837, in Prussia.
