= William Burgit =

American politician

William Burgit was a member of the Wisconsin State Assembly.

== Biography ==
Burgit was born on December 6, 1818, in Richford, New York. He died on September 23, 1892.

== Career ==
Burgit was first elected to the Assembly in 1869 for the 1870 session. He also served during the 1874 session. Previously Burgit had unsuccessfully run for the Republican nomination for the Assembly in 1860. That year, he ran in the general election as an independent, also unsuccessfully. Other positions he held include member of the county board of Walworth County, Wisconsin.
