= Joseph M. Thomas =

Former Wisconsin State Assembly member

Joseph Mott Thomas (23 August 1829 – 3 April 1910) was a member of the Wisconsin State Assembly in 1869, 1878 and 1879. He was a Republican. Thomas was born in Columbia, New York.
