= Jefferson, Monroe County, Wisconsin =

Jefferson, Wisconsin
- Town
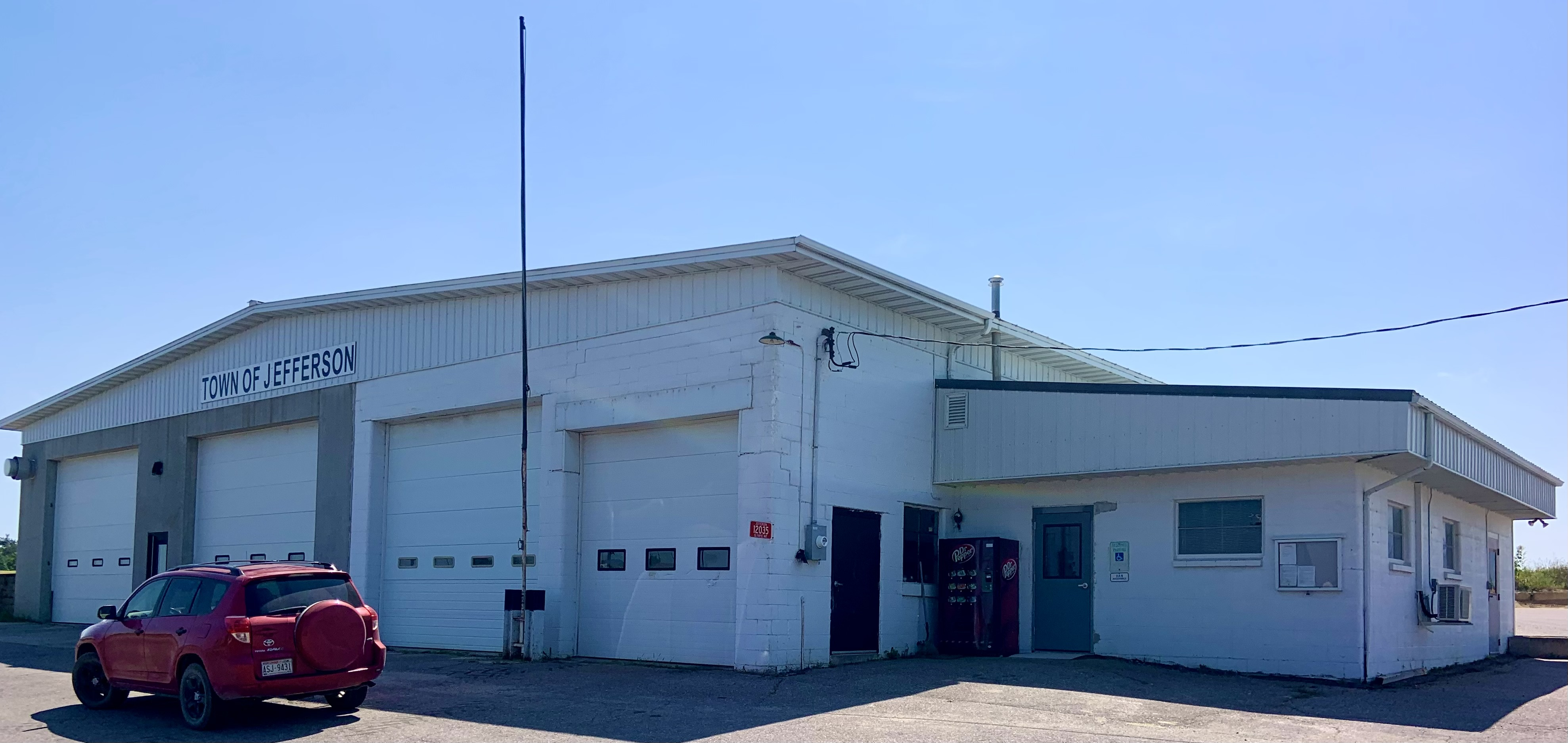
- Jefferson Town Hall

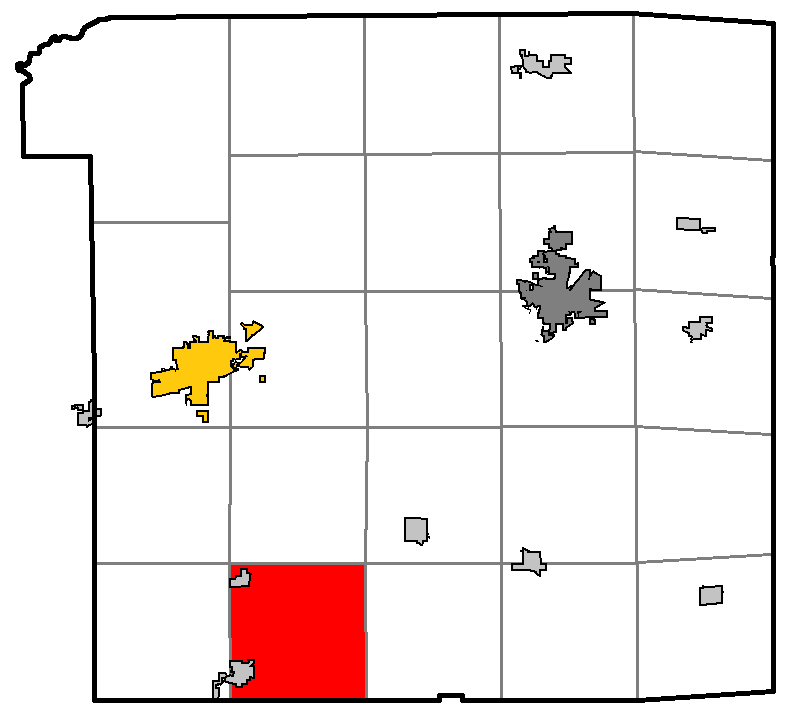
- Location of Jefferson, Monroe County, Wisconsin

- Location of Monroe County, Wisconsin
- Coordinates: 43°46′22″N 90°45′0″W
- Country: United States
- State: Wisconsin
- County: Monroe

Area
  - Total: 34.9 sq mi (90.3 km^{2})
  - Land: 34.9 sq mi (90.3 km^{2})
  - Water: 0 sq mi (0.0 km^{2})
- Elevation: 1,385 ft (422 m)

Population (2020)
  - Total: 841
  - Density: 24.1/sq mi (9.31/km^{2})
- Time zone: UTC-6 (Central (CST))
  - Summer (DST): UTC-5 (CDT)
- Area code: 608
- FIPS code: 55-37950
- GNIS feature ID: 1583453

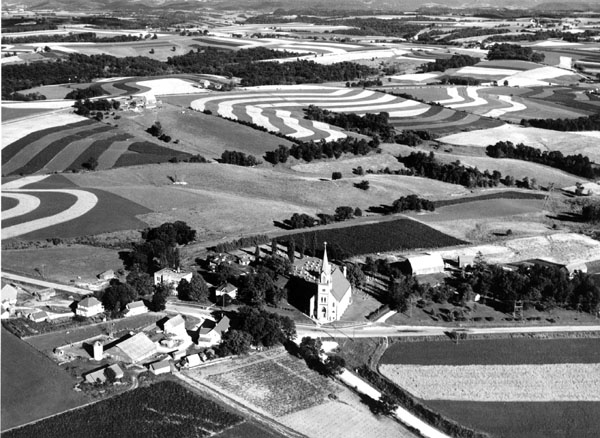
Aerial photograph of St. Mary's Church in Jefferson, 1957, with strip farming visible in the background.

Jefferson is a town in Monroe County, Wisconsin, United States. The population was 841 at the 2020 census. The unincorporated community of St. Mary's is located within the town.

== Geography ==
According to the United States Census Bureau, the town has a total area of 34.9 square miles (90.3 km^{2}), all land.

== Demographics ==
As of the census of 2000, there were 800 people, 227 households, and 187 families residing in the town. The population density was 23.0 people per square mile (8.9/km^{2}). There were 236 housing units at an average density of 6.8 per square mile (2.6/km^{2}). The racial makeup of the town was 96.62% White, 2.75% Asian, 0.12% from other races, and 0.50% from two or more races. Hispanic or Latino of any race were 1.00% of the population.

There were 227 households, out of which 48.5% had children under the age of 18 living with them, 74.4% were married couples living together, 3.5% had a female householder with no husband present, and 17.2% were non-families. 15.0% of all households were made up of individuals, and 6.6% had someone living alone who was 65 years of age or older. The average household size was 3.52 and the average family size was 3.94.

In the town, the population was spread out, with 40.5% under the age of 18, 7.6% from 18 to 24, 25.8% from 25 to 44, 17.1% from 45 to 64, and 9.0% who were 65 years of age or older. The median age was 27 years. For every 100 females, there were 111.1 males. For every 100 females age 18 and over, there were 108.8 males.

The median income for a household in the town was $33,750, and the median income for a family was $38,036. Males had a median income of $25,375 versus $18,625 for females. The per capita income for the town was $12,511. About 19.2% of families and 26.9% of the population were below the poverty line, including 37.5% of those under age 18 and 20.6% of those age 65 or over.
