= Daniel Downs =

American politician

Daniel Downs (December 2, 1824 – September 14, 1897) was a member of the Wisconsin State Assembly and the Wisconsin State Senate.

== Biography ==
Downs was born in Trumbull County, Ohio. A Congregationalist, Downs married Mary D. Cowen in 1850. They would have four children. Previously, Downs had completed his education at Rush Medical College. During the American Civil War, he served with the 46th Wisconsin Volunteer Infantry Regiment of the Union Army as a surgeon.

== Political career ==
Downs was a member of the Assembly in 1855. In 1860, Downs changed his party affiliation from Democratic to Republican. He was a member of the Senate from 1876 to 1877 representing the 28th District. Other positions he held include County Treasurer of Richland County, Wisconsin and Richland County judge.

He died at home at the age of 73, following a stroke the week before.
