= John L. Semmann =

American politician

John L. Semmann (March 18, 1822 – January 19, 1907) was a member of the Wisconsin State Assembly.

== Biography ==
John Leborius Semmann was born on March 18, 1822, in Koslin, Prussia. He married Eva Juditha Koch and had eleven children. Semmann died on January 19, 1907, in Milwaukee, Wisconsin, and was buried there.

== Career ==
Semmann was a Democratic member of the Assembly during the 1871 and 1874 sessions.
