= Springfield, Jackson County, Wisconsin =

Springfield, Wisconsin
- Town
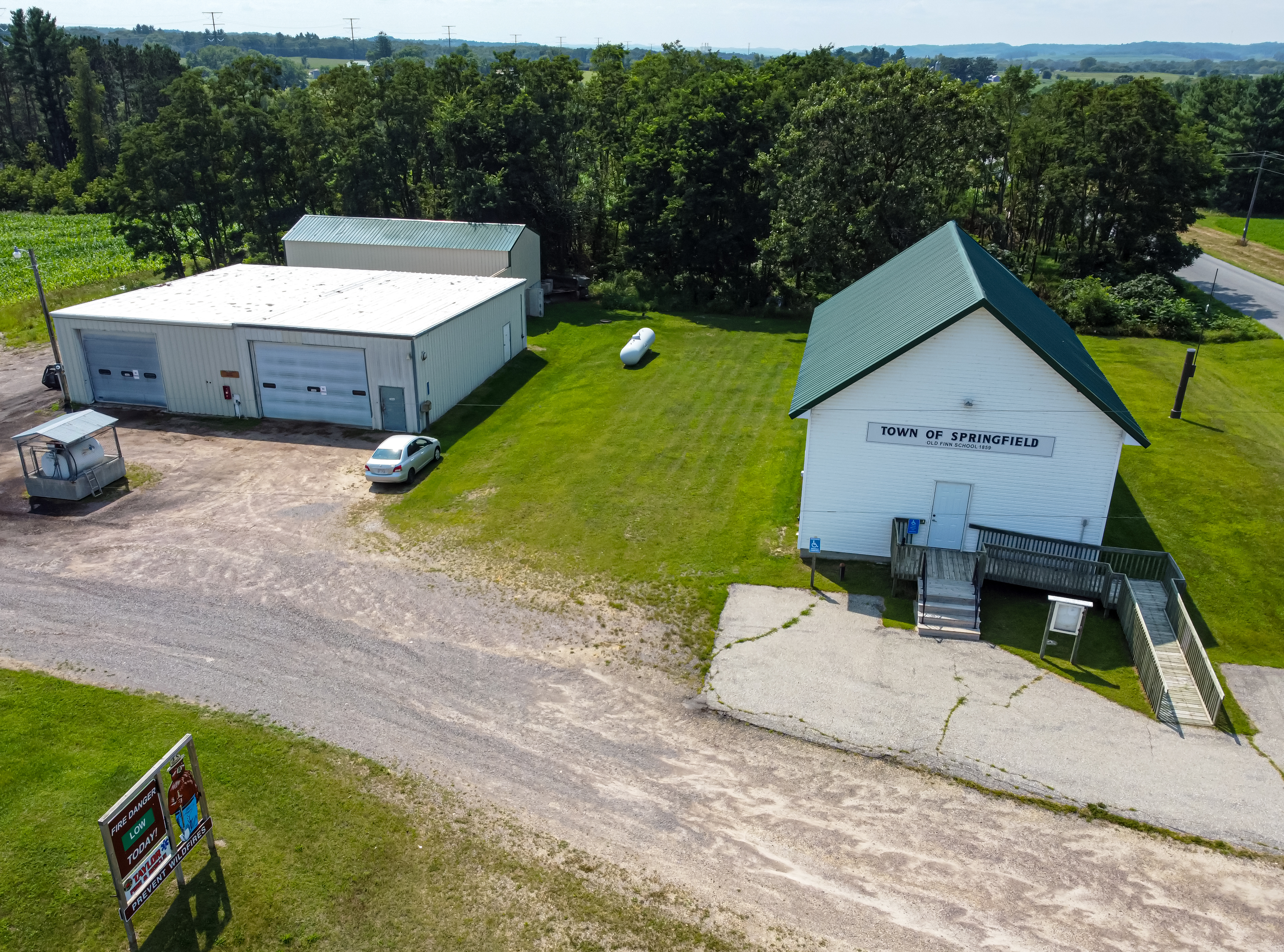
- Town hall south of Taylor, Wisconsin

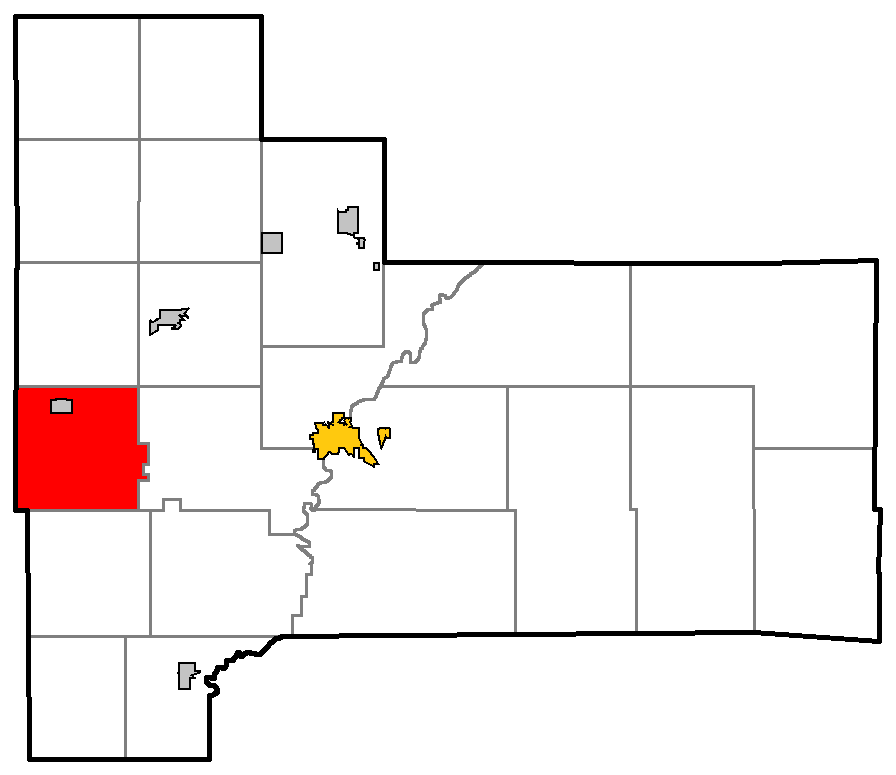
- Location of Springfield, Jackson County

- Location of Jackson County, Wisconsin
- Coordinates: 44°17′20″N 91°6′30″W
- Country: United States
- State: Wisconsin
- County: Jackson

Area
  - Total: 36.5 sq mi (94.5 km^{2})
  - Land: 36.5 sq mi (94.5 km^{2})
  - Water: 0.039 sq mi (0.1 km^{2})
- Elevation: 938 ft (286 m)

Population (2020)
  - Total: 693
  - Density: 19.0/sq mi (7.33/km^{2})
- Time zone: UTC-6 (Central (CST))
  - Summer (DST): UTC-5 (CDT)
- FIPS code: 55-75900
- GNIS feature ID: 1584193
- Website: townofspringfieldwi.com

Springfield is a town in Jackson County, Wisconsin, United States. The population was 693 at the 2020 census. The village of Taylor is located within the town.

== Geography ==
According to the United States Census Bureau, the town has a total area of 36.5 square miles (94.5 km^{2}), of which 36.5 square miles (94.5 km^{2}) is land and 0.04 square mile (0.1 km^{2}) (0.05%) is water.

== Demographics ==
As of the census of 2000, there were 567 people, 187 households, and 152 families residing in the town. The population density was 15.5 people per square mile (6.0/km^{2}). There were 229 housing units at an average density of 6.3 per square mile (2.4/km^{2}). The racial makeup of the town was 96.83% White, 0.18% African American, 1.59% Native American, 0.18% Asian, and 1.23% from two or more races.

There were 187 households, out of which 40.1% had children under the age of 18 living with them, 71.1% were married couples living together, 7.5% had a female householder with no husband present, and 18.7% were non-families. 13.9% of all households were made up of individuals, and 5.9% had someone living alone who was 65 years of age or older. The average household size was 3.03 and the average family size was 3.36.

In the town, the population was spread out, with 32.8% under the age of 18, 8.5% from 18 to 24, 26.5% from 25 to 44, 23.3% from 45 to 64, and 9.0% who were 65 years of age or older. The median age was 34 years. For every 100 females, there were 119.8 males. For every 100 females age 18 and over, there were 105.9 males.

The median income for a household in the town was $40,179, and the median income for a family was $39,000. Males had a median income of $25,769 versus $20,795 for females. The per capita income for the town was $16,075. About 4.8% of families and 9.5% of the population were below the poverty line, including 18.9% of those under age 18 and none of those age 65 or over.
