= Gaugrehweiler =

- Municipality
- Coat of arms

- Location of Gaugrehweiler within Donnersbergkreis district
- Interactive map of Gaugrehweiler
- Location within Germany Location within Rhineland-Palatinate
- Coordinates: 49°42′22″N 07°51′52″E
- Country: Germany
- State: Rhineland-Palatinate
- District: Donnersbergkreis
- Municipal assoc.: Nordpfälzer Land

Government
  - Mayor (2019–24): Romy Heblich

Area
  - Total: 9.92 km^{2} (3.83 sq mi)
- Elevation: 227 m (745 ft)

Population (2025-12-31)
  - Total: 506
  - Density: 51.0/km^{2} (132/sq mi)
- Time zone: UTC+01:00 (CET)
  - Summer (DST): UTC+02:00 (CEST)
- Postal codes: 67822
- Dialling codes: 06362
- Vehicle registration: KIB
- Website: www.gaugrehweiler.de

Gaugrehweiler is a municipality in the Donnersbergkreis district, in Rhineland-Palatinate, Germany.

Between 1749 and 1756, count Carl Magnus von Rheingrafenstein constructed Schloss Gaugrehweiler. It was demolished in the 1790s, following the French conquest of the region. Little of the palace survives above ground today, though archaeological and architectural remnants remain in the village center.
