= 24th Wisconsin Legislature =

Wisconsin legislative term for 1871

←	23rd	25th	→
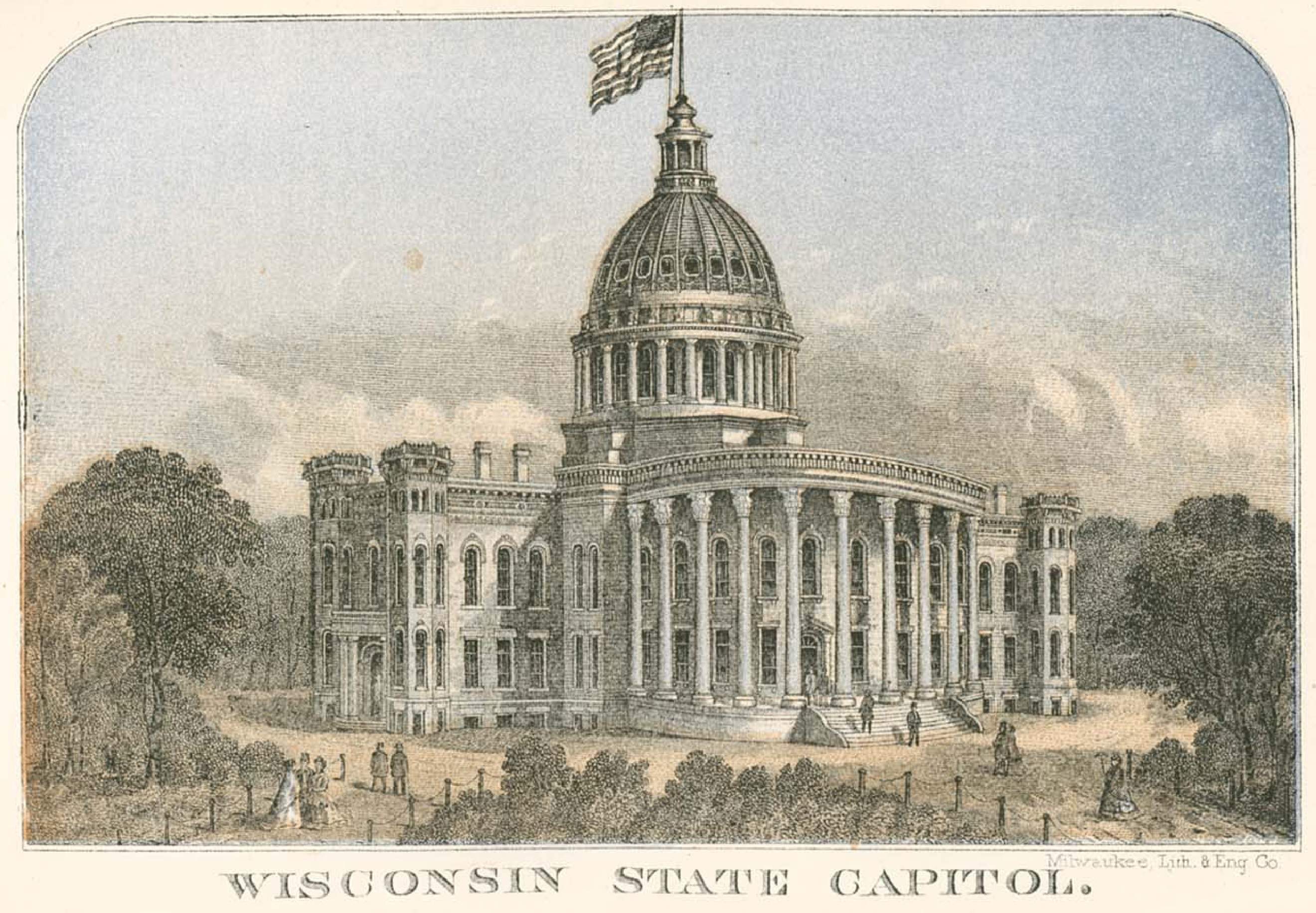
- Wisconsin State Capitol, 1863

Overview
- Legislative body: Wisconsin Legislature
- Meeting place: Wisconsin State Capitol
- Term: January 2, 1871 – January 1, 1872
- Election: November 8, 1870

Senate
- Members: 33
- Senate President: Thaddeus C. Pound (R)
- President pro tempore: Charles G. Williams (R)
- Party control: Republican

Assembly
- Members: 100
- Assembly Speaker: William E. Smith (R)
- Party control: Republican

Sessions
- 1st: January 11, 1871 – March 25, 1871

The Twenty-Fourth Wisconsin Legislature convened from January 11, 1871, to March 25, 1871, in regular session.

Senators representing odd-numbered districts were newly elected for this session and were serving the first year of a two-year term. Assembly members were elected to a one-year term. Assembly members and odd-numbered senators were elected in the general election of November 8, 1870. Senators representing even-numbered districts were serving the second year of their two-year term, having been elected in the general election held on November 2, 1869.

The governor of Wisconsin during this entire term was Republican Lucius Fairchild, of Dane County, serving the second year of his third two-year term, having won re-election in the 1869 Wisconsin gubernatorial election.

== Major events ==
- January 18, 1871: Proclamation of the German Empire formalized the creation of the German Empire from the North German Confederation and their south German allies.
- April 20, 1871: U.S. President Ulysses S. Grant signed the Civil Rights Act of 1871, commonly known as the "Ku Klux Klan Act".
- May 4, 1871: The first Major League Baseball game was played.
- May 10, 1871: Treaty of Frankfurt ended the Franco-Prussian War and transferred the provinces of Alsace and Lorraine from France to the Germany.
- October 8, 1871: The Peshtigo fire burned about 1.2 million acres in northeast Wisconsin and resulted in more than 1,500 deaths. The Great Chicago Fire occurred on the same day, killing approximately 300 and destroying 17,500 buildings.
- November 7, 1871: Cadwallader C. Washburn elected Governor of Wisconsin.

== Major legislation ==
- March 24, 1871: An Act to apportion the state into senate and assembly districts.

== Party summary ==
=== Senate summary ===
Senate partisan composition Democratic: 14 seats Republican: 19 seats

	Party (Shading indicates majority caucus)		Total	
	Democratic	Republican	Total	Vacant
End of previous Legislature	14	19	33	0
1st Session	14	19	33	0
Final voting share	42.42%	57.58%		
Beginning of the next Legislature	10	23	33	0

=== Assembly summary ===
Assembly partisan composition Democratic: 40 seats Independent: 3 seats Republican: 57 seats

	Party (Shading indicates majority caucus)			Total	
	Democratic	Ind.	Republican	Total	Vacant
End of previous Legislature	39	1	60	100	0
1st Session	40	3	57	100	0
Final voting share	40%	3%	57%		
Beginning of the next Legislature	40	0	60	100	0

== Sessions ==
- 1st Regular session: January 11, 1871 – March 25, 1871

== Leaders ==
=== Senate leadership ===
- President of the Senate: Thaddeus C. Pound (R)
- President pro tempore: Charles G. Williams (R)

=== Assembly leadership ===
- Speaker of the Assembly: William E. Smith (R)

== Members ==
=== Members of the Senate ===
Members of the Senate for the Twenty-Fourth Wisconsin Legislature:

Senate partisan representation Democratic: 14 seats Republican: 19 seats

Dist.	Counties	Senator	Residence	Party
01	Sheboygan	John H. Jones	Sheboygan	Rep.
02	Brown, Door, Kewaunee	Lyman Walker	Ahnapee	Dem.
03	Ozaukee	Lyman Morgan	Ozaukee	Dem.
04	Washington	Adam Schantz	Addison	Dem.
05	Milwaukee (Northern Half)	Francis Huebschmann	Milwaukee	Dem.
06	Milwaukee (Southern Half)	Peter V. Deuster	Milwaukee	Dem.
07	Racine	Philo Belden	Rochester	Rep.
08	Kenosha	Milton Pettit	Kenosha	Rep.
09	Adams, Juneau, Monroe	Eliphalet S. Miner	Necedah	Rep.
10	Waukesha	John A. Rice	Merton	Dem.
11	Dane (Eastern Part)	William M. Colladay	Stoughton	Rep.
12	Walworth	Samuel Pratt	Spring Prairie	Rep.
13	Lafayette	Henry S. Magoon	Darlington	Rep.
14	Sauk	Bennett Strong	Spring Green	Rep.
15	Iowa	Francis Little	Linden	Rep.
16	Grant	George C. Hazelton	Boscobel	Rep.
17	Rock	Charles G. Williams	Janesville	Rep.
18	Dodge (Western Part)	Samuel D. Burchard	Beaver Dam	Dem.
19	Manitowoc	Carl H. Schmidt	Manitowoc	Dem.
20	Fond du Lac	Hiram S. Town	Ripon	Rep.
21	Winnebago	James H. Foster	Koro	Rep.
22	Calumet, Oconto, Outagamie, Shawano	George Baldwin	Chilton	Dem.
23	Jefferson	William W. Woodman	Farmington	Dem.
24	Green	John C. Hall	Monroe	Rep.
25	Columbia	William M. Griswold	Columbus	Rep.
26	Dane (Western Part)	Romanzo E. Davis	Middleton	Rep.
27	Marathon, Portage, Waupaca, Wood	Myron Reed	Waupaca	Dem.
28	Ashland, Barron, Bayfield, Burnett, Douglas, Pierce, Polk, St. Croix	Edward H. Ives	Trimbelle	Dem.
29	Green Lake, Marquette, Waushara	Waldo Flint	Princeton	Rep.
30	Crawford, Richland	George Krouskop	Richland Center	Dem.
31	La Crosse & Vernon	Angus Cameron	La Crosse	Rep.
32	Buffalo, Chippewa, Clark, Dunn, Eau Claire, Jackson, Pepin, Trempealeau	William T. Price	Black River Falls	Rep.
33	Dodge (Eastern Part)	Satterlee Clark	Horicon	Dem.

=== Members of the Assembly ===
Members of the Assembly for the Twenty-Fourth Wisconsin Legislature:

Assembly partisan representation Democratic: 40 seats Independent: 3 seats Republican: 57 seats

Senate District	County	Dist.	Representative	Party	Residence
09	Adams		Anson Rood	Rep.	Dell Prairie
28	Ashland, Barron, Bayfield, Burnett, Douglas, Polk		Samuel S. Vaughn	Rep.	Bayfield
02	Brown	1	Joseph S. Curtis	Rep.	Green Bay
02	Brown	2	David Cooper Ayres	Rep.	Fort Howard
32	Buffalo		Ahaz F. Allen	Rep.	Gilmantown
22	Calumet		William H. Dick	Dem.	Brothertown
32	Chippewa & Dunn		James A. Bate	Rep.	Chippewa Falls
32	Clark & Jackson		George W. King	Rep.	Humbird
25	Columbia	1	Stillman E. Dana	Rep.	Portage
25	Columbia	2	Thomas Sanderson	Rep.	Leeds
25	Columbia	3	George G. Marvin	Rep.	Randolph
30	Crawford		Darius W. Briggs	Rep.	Utica
11	Dane	1	Lemuel O. Humphrey	Rep.	Albion
11	Dane	2	Knudt O. Heimdal	Dem.	Deerfield
26	Dane	3	Matthew Anderson	Dem.	Cross Plains
26	Dane	4	Ole Torgerson	Rep.	Perry
26	Dane	5	Harlow S. Orton	Ind.	Madison
18	Dodge	1	William E. Smith	Rep.	Fox Lake
18	Dodge	2	Allen H. Atwater	Rep.	Oak Grove
33	Dodge	3	William Rusch	Dem.	Herman
33	Dodge	4	Marcus Trumer	Dem.	Rubicon
02	Door & Kewaunee		Joseph McCormick	Dem.	Ahnapee
32	Eau Claire & Pepin		Henry Cousins	Rep.	Eau Claire
20	Fond du Lac	1	Jehdeiah Bowen	Rep.	Ripon
20	Fond du Lac	2	John A. Baker	Rep.	Waupun
20	Fond du Lac	3	Gerrit T. Thorn	Dem.	Fond du Lac
20	Fond du Lac	4	Uriah D. Mihills	Rep.	Fond du Lac
20	Fond du Lac	5	Michael Lonergan	Dem.	Byron
20	Fond du Lac	6	Joseph Wagner	Dem.	Marshfield
16	Grant	1	Joseph Harris	Rep.	Hazel Green
16	Grant	2	Henry B. Coons	Dem.	Potosi
16	Grant	3	John C. Holloway	Rep.	Lancaster
16	Grant	4	William W. Field	Rep.	Boscobel
16	Grant	5	George H. Chambers	Rep.	Bloomington
24	Green	1	Orrin Bacon	Rep.	Montello
24	Green	2	Marshal H. Pengra	Rep.	Sylvester
29	Green Lake		Archibald Nichols	Rep.	Berlin
15	Iowa	1	Henry C. Barnard	Dem.	Avoca
15	Iowa	2	John J. Davis	Rep.	Linden
23	Jefferson	1	Daniel Hall	Rep.	Watertown
23	Jefferson	2	William L. Hoskins	Dem.	Lake Mills
23	Jefferson	3	Nelson Fryer	Dem.	Cold Spring
23	Jefferson	4	Hiram J. Ball	Dem.	Palmyra
09	Juneau		Perry R. Briggs	Rep.	Mauston
08	Kenosha		Jonas W. Rhodes	Ind.	Somers
31	La Crosse	1	Gideon Hixon	Rep.	La Crosse
31	La Crosse	2	Powers Moulton	Rep.	Onalaska
13	Lafayette	1	Patrick Galagan	Dem.	Elk Grove
13	Lafayette	2	Henry W. Barnes	Dem.	Wiota
19	Manitowoc	1	Svend Samuelson	Rep.	Liberty
19	Manitowoc	2	Michael Fitzgerald	Dem.	Maple Grove
19	Manitowoc	3	Joseph Rankin	Dem.	Manitowoc
27	Marathon & Wood		Rufus P. Manson	Dem.	Wausau
29	Marquette		Spencer A. Pease	Dem.	Montello
05	Milwaukee	1	James S. White	Dem.	Milwaukee
05	Milwaukee	2	August Richter	Dem.	Milwaukee
06	Milwaukee	3	James Hoye	Dem.	Milwaukee
06	Milwaukee	4	Charles M. Hoyt	Dem.	Milwaukee
06	Milwaukee	5	Charles F. Freeman	Dem.	Milwaukee
05	Milwaukee	6	Daniel H. Richards	Dem.	Milwaukee
05	Milwaukee	7	Matthew Keenan	Dem.	Milwaukee
05	Milwaukee	8	John L. Semmann	Dem.	Milwaukee
06	Milwaukee	9	Valentin Knœll	Dem.	Franklin
06	Milwaukee	10	James Watts	Dem.	Milwaukee
09	Monroe		David D. Cheney	Rep.	Sparta
22	Oconto & Shawano		Parlan Semple	Rep.	Waukechon
22	Outagamie		Charles E. McIntosh	Dem.	Appleton
03	Ozaukee		Charles G. Meyer	Dem.	Fredonia
28	Pierce		Oliver S. Powell	Rep.	River Falls
27	Portage		Thomas McDill	Rep.	Plover
07	Racine	1	Lucius S. Blake	Rep.	Racine
07	Racine	2	George Bremner	Ind.	Dover
30	Richland		Elihu Bailey	Rep.	Marshall
17	Rock	1	Halvor H. Peterson	Rep.	Spring Valley
17	Rock	2	Robert Townshend Powell	Rep.	Fulton
17	Rock	3	Adelmorn Sherman	Rep.	Janesville
17	Rock	4	John Hammond	Rep.	Turtle
17	Rock	5	Willard Merrill	Rep.	Janesville
14	Sauk	1	Carl C. Kuntz	Rep.	Troy
14	Sauk	2	George G. Swain	Rep.	New Buffalo
01	Sheboygan	1	Charles Œtling	Dem.	Herman
01	Sheboygan	2	Enos Eastman	Dem.	Plymouth
01	Sheboygan	3	Hiram N. Smith	Rep.	Sheboygan Falls
28	St. Croix		Revel K. Fay	Rep.	Star Prairie
32	Trempealeau		Alexander A. Arnold	Rep.	Galesville
31	Vernon	1	Joseph W. Hoyt	Rep.	Chaseburg
31	Vernon	2	Henry A. Chase	Rep.	Viroqua
12	Walworth	1	John Jeffers	Rep.	Darien
12	Walworth	2	Amzy Merriam	Rep.	Linn
12	Walworth	3	Samuel A. White	Dem.	Whitewater
04	Washington	1	Baruch S. Weil	Dem.	Schleisingerville
04	Washington	2	Densmore W. Maxon	Dem.	Cedar Creek
10	Waukesha	1	Leonard D. Hinkley	Dem.	Eagle
10	Waukesha	2	John D. McDonald	Dem.	Summit
10	Waukesha	3	William Ockler	Dem.	Muskego
27	Waupaca		George E. More	Rep.	Royalton
29	Waushara		Edwin Montgomery	Rep.	Hancock
21	Winnebago	1	Russell J. Judd	Rep.	Algoma
21	Winnebago	2	William P. Rounds	Rep.	Menasha
21	Winnebago	3	Frederic A. Morgan	Rep.	Black Wolf

== Employees ==
=== Senate employees ===
- Chief Clerk: O. R. Smith
  - Assistant Clerk: J. H. Waggoner
    - Bookkeeper: Sid A. Foster
  - Engrossing Clerk: A. J. High
  - Enrolling Clerk: H. L. Hyde
  - Transcribing Clerk: Richard Perry
- Sergeant-at-Arms: W. W. Baker
  - Assistant Sergeant-at-Arms: W. W. Dantz
- Postmaster: C. E. Weeks
  - Assistant Postmaster: Hiram Seffens
- Doorkeeper: W. G. Hyde
- Doorkeeper: H. E. Seaver
  - Assistant Doorkeeper: J. Dixon
  - Assistant Doorkeeper: C. W. Watrous
  - Assistant Doorkeeper: H. A. Wilcox
  - Gallery Doorkeeper: A. A. Petty
  - Night Watch: John Grant Jr.
- Governor's Attendant: C. H. Stone
- Porter: F. H. Bates
- General Messenger: Willie Hadley
- Clerk's Messenger: Willie Bowen
- Messengers:
  - Willie Dennison
  - Frank Roe
  - Charles Young
  - Charles H. Newton
  - Patrick Tierney

=== Assembly employees ===
- Chief Clerk: Ephraim W. Young
  - Assistant Clerk: William M. Newcomb
    - Bookkeeper: Fred A. Dennett
  - Engrossing Clerk: C. D. Purple
  - Enrolling Clerk: Jacob Fuss
  - Transcribing Clerk: Linda Harris
- Sergeant-at-Arms: Sam Fifield
  - 1st Assistant Sergeant-at-Arms: O. C. Bissell
  - 2nd Assistant Sergeant-at-Arms: D. L. Quaw
- Postmaster: Myron DeWolf
  - 1st Assistant Postmaster: J. F. Cleghorn
  - 2nd Assistant Postmaster: Albert Emonson
- Doorkeepers:
  - E. S. Blake
  - Thomas Watson
  - John Stansmore
  - O. R. Jones
- Night Watch: W. A. Fay
- Firemen:
  - D. B. Crandall
  - Richard Prichard
- Gallery Attendants:
  - Peter Williams
  - A. J. Sutherland
- Committee Room Attendants:
  - J. W. Brackett
  - L. N. Taylor
  - William W. Maxwell
  - George Slingsby
- Washroom Attendant: S. D. Hanchett
- Porter: R. S. Warner
- Speaker's Messenger: Willie Holmes
- Chief Clerk's Messenger: Frank R. Norton
- Sergeant-at-Arms' Messenger: Willie Potter
- Messengers:
  - Frank Beyler
  - Daniel Fitzpatrick
  - George E. McDill
  - George Sherman
  - Freddie Blake
  - Ballard P. Barnett
  - Eugene Kuntz
  - S. G. Huntington
  - Charles F. Dana
  - Adolph Hastreiter
  - Emeal Hammer
