= James H. Foster =

19th century American politician

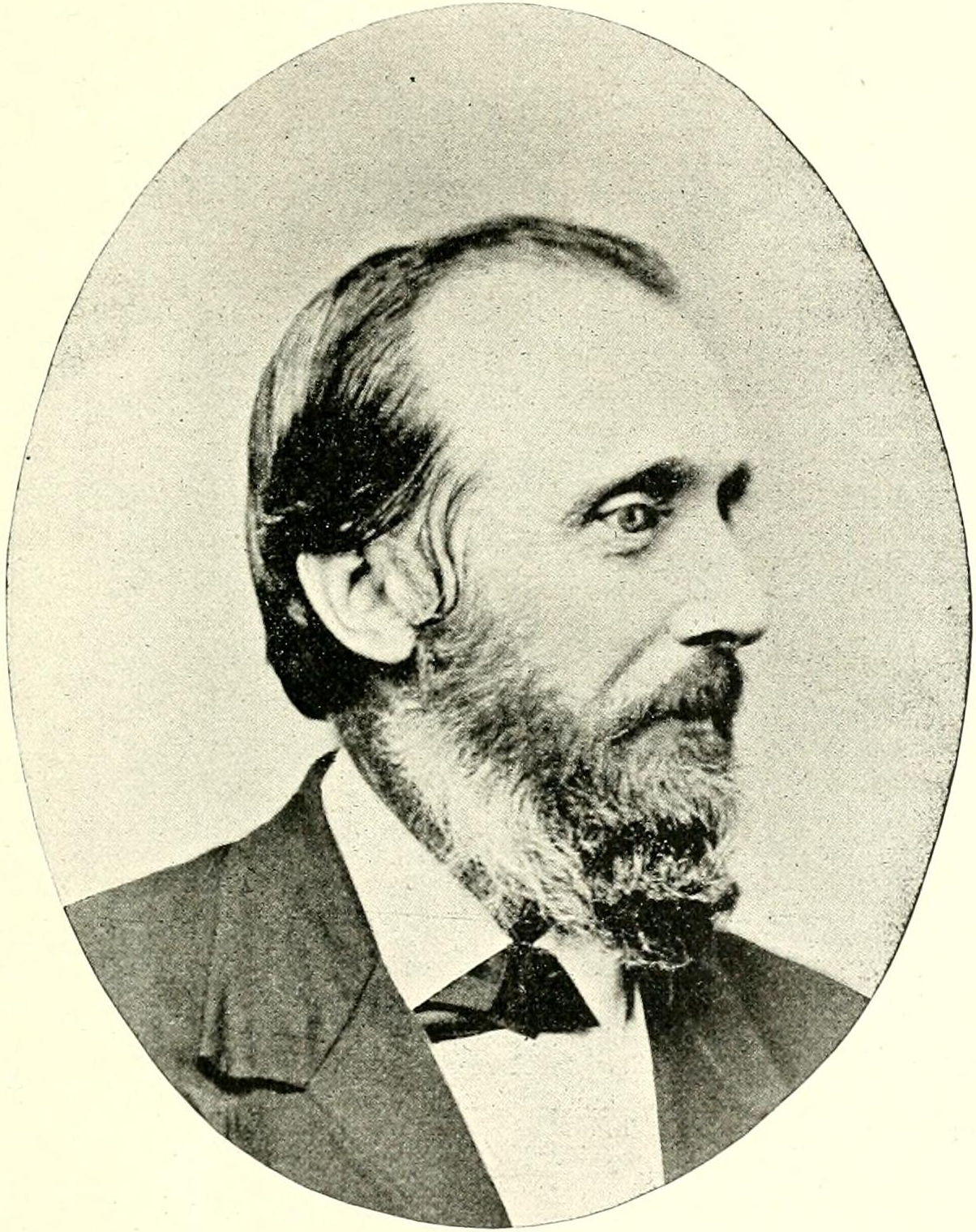
- From Foster Genealogy (1899)

Member of the Wisconsin Senate
- In office January 1, 1872 – January 6, 1873
- Preceded by: Carl Schmidt
- Succeeded by: Robert McCurdy
- Constituency: 19th Senate district
- In office January 2, 1871 – January 1, 1872
- Preceded by: Ira W. Fisher
- Succeeded by: Myron Reed
- Constituency: 21st Senate district

Member of the Wisconsin State Assembly from the Winnebago 3rd district
- In office January 4, 1869 – January 2, 1871
- Preceded by: Milo C. Bushnell
- Succeeded by: Frederic A. Morgan

Register of Deeds of Winnebago County, Wisconsin
- In office January 1, 1859 – January 1, 1863
- Preceded by: Edgar Cronkhite
- Succeeded by: Andrew Merton

Personal details
- Born: August 3, 1827 Ware, Massachusetts, U.S.
- Died: August 11, 1907 (aged 80) Berlin, Wisconsin, U.S.
- Resting place: Nepeuskun Cemetery, Rush Lake, Wisconsin
- Party: Republican
- Spouse: Lucy Jane Lathrop (m. 1848–1907)
- Children: Avis Florette (Baker)^{(b. 1849; died 1927)}; Mary Frances (Whidden)^{(b. 1851; died 1941)}; Jennie M. (Silver) (Eddy)^{(b. 1857; died 1897)}
- Occupation: Farmer, politician

James Hervey Foster (August 3, 1827 – August 11, 1907) was an American farmer, Republican politician, and Wisconsin pioneer. He was a member of the Wisconsin State Senate (1871, 1872) and State Assembly (1869, 1870), representing Winnebago County.

== Early years ==
James H. Foster was born in the town of Ware, Massachusetts, in August 1827. He received a common school education and came west to the Wisconsin Territory with his parents in 1846, settling on a farm what is now the town of Nepeuskun, in Winnebago County. After arriving in Wisconsin, he attended a partial college education at Ripon College, but never graduated.

== Political career and public office ==
He first entered public notoriety in 1847, when he delivered a speech for the Independence Day celebrations. He subsequently organized a debating society and a temperance society. He was soon elected superintendent of schools, and served in that office several years.

A post office was established in the home of Foster's father in the community of Koro in 1850, and Foster was named the first postmaster. He served in that role until elected register of deeds for Winnebago County in 1858. He was re-elected to another two year term in 1860. His father was appointed to succeed him as postmaster and served until his death in 1862. After which, James H. Foster returned to the office of postmaster.

He continued as postmaster until elected to the Wisconsin State Assembly in 1868. At that point, his daughter, Florette, was appointed postmaster at Koro. Foster was elected to two consecutive terms in the Assembly, running on the Republican ticket. He served in the 1869 and 1870 sessions. In 1870, he won election to the Wisconsin State Senate, representing all of Winnebago County during the 1871 and 1872 sessions.

He again resumed the office of postmaster after his daughter's marriage in May 1872, until forced to abdicate the office again after he was chosen by the Republican Party of Wisconsin as a presidential elector in 1876. At that time, his younger daughter, Jennie, received the office.

He did not hold elected office again, but remained involved in the state Republican Party as a frequent delegate to the state conventions, and served as secretary of the state party for several years.

In 1877, Foster was appointed clerk to the Wisconsin Railroad Commissioner (later the title changed to "deputy commissioner"), and was retained in this position by the next four railroad commissioners, holding office for 16 years. He also received several honorary appointments during these years. He was appointed delegate to the Mississippi River Improvement Convention in 1881, and to the National Farmer's Congress in 1887.

In 1891, he was one of the founders of the Berlin National Bank, in Berlin, Wisconsin, and was the first president of the bank. He relocated to Berlin in the early 1900s, and died at his home in Berlin in August 1907.

== Personal life and family ==
James H. Foster was the only son of Asahel B. Foster and his wife Avis (née Topliff). James' mother was a niece of Revolutionary War officer William Eaton. The Fosters trace their lineage back to Sergeant Thomas Foster, who came from England to the Massachusetts Bay Colony in 1634.

James Foster married Lucy Jane Lathrop at Green Lake, Wisconsin, in 1848. They had three daughters. Foster was survived by his wife and two of his daughters.

Aside from his business and political pursuits, Foster was a lifelong supporter of temperance, but opposed the idea that it should be handled as a political issue—preferring that it should be handled as a moral and societal concern.

== Electoral history ==
=== Wisconsin Assembly (1868, 1869) ===
Wisconsin Assembly, Winnebago 3rd District Election, 1869
Party	Candidate	Votes	%	±%
General Election, November 2, 1869
Republican	James H. Foster (incumbent)	1,011	63.99%	
Independent	James Liddle	569	36.01%	
Plurality		442	27.97%	
Total votes		1,580	100.0%	
Republican hold				

=== Wisconsin Senate (1870) ===
Wisconsin Senate, 21st District Election, 1870
Party	Candidate	Votes	%	±%
General Election, November 8, 1870
Republican	James H. Foster	3,348	61.74%	−1.40%
Democratic	Charles A. Weisbrod	2,075	38.26%	
Plurality		1,273	23.47%	-2.81%
Total votes		5,423	100.0%	-27.13%
Republican hold				

Wisconsin State Assembly
Preceded by Milo C. Bushnell	Member of the Wisconsin State Assembly from the Winnebago 3rd district January 4, 1869 – January 2, 1871	Succeeded by Frederic A. Morgan
Wisconsin Senate
Preceded by Ira W. Fisher	Member of the Wisconsin Senate from the 21st district January 2, 1871 – January 1, 1872	Succeeded by Myron Reed
Preceded by Carl Schmidt	Member of the Wisconsin Senate from the 19th district January 1, 1872 – January 6, 1873	Succeeded by Robert McCurdy
Political offices
Preceded by Edgar Cronkhite	Register of Deeds of Winnebago County, Wisconsin; January 1, 1859 – January 1, 1863	Succeeded by Andrew Merton
