= Joseph McCormick =

Joseph McCormick may refer to:

- Joseph McCormick (minister) (1733–1799), Moderator of the General Assembly of the Church of Scotland in 1782, joint founder of the Royal Society of Edinburgh, a Principal at St Andrews University
- Joseph B. McCormick, epidemiologist, professor, and chief at the Centers for Disease Control and Prevention
- J. Carroll McCormick (1907–1996), Roman Catholic bishop
- Joe McCormick (footballer) (1916-?), Welsh footballer, see List of Rochdale A.F.C. players (25–99 appearances)
- Joseph F. McCormick (born 1962), American politician, businessman, political activist
- Joseph H. McCormick, American football coach
- Joseph Medill McCormick (1877–1925), U.S. Representative and Senator from Illinois
- Joseph McCormick (cricketer) (1834–1914), English amateur cricketer
- Joseph McCormick (ice hockey) (1894–1958), Canadian, and later American, ice hockey player
- Joseph McCormick (politician and soldier) (1787–1875), American politician in Indiana and Wisconsin
- Joseph McCormick (Ohio lawyer) (1814–1879), second Attorney General of Ohio
- Joseph Gough McCormick (1874–1924), Dean of Manchester

== See also ==
- McCormick (surname)
