= List of Mount St. Mary's Mountaineers men's basketball head coaches =

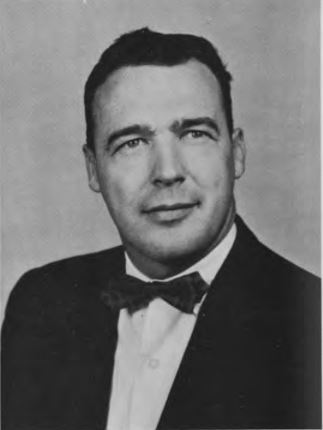
Jim Phelan, the winningest head coach in Mountaineers men's basketball history.

The following is a list of Mount St. Mary's Mountaineers men's basketball head coaches. There have been 23 head coaches of the Mountaineers in their 114-season history.

Mount St. Mary's' current head coach is Donny Lind. He was hired as the Mountaineers' head coach in April, 2024, replacing Dan Engelstad, who left to become an assistant coach at Syracuse University.

No.	Tenure	Coach	Years	Record	Pct.
1	1908–1909	William Walsh	1	1–0	1.000
2	1909–1910	Al Barrett	8	21–73	.223
3	1910–1911	Francis Liddy	1	7–4	.636
4	1911–1913; 1917–1920	Mike Thompson	5	42–22	.656
5	1913–1917	John L. Day	4	40–22	.645
6	1920–1921	Charles A. Dickerman	1	10–2	.833
7	1921–1923	John Sheridan	2	28–12	.700
8	1923–1924	Walter Halas	1	16–5	.762
9	1924–1935; 1938–1941	Art Malloy	14	155–117	.570
10	1935–1937	Joe Lawler	2	23–15	.605
11	1937–1938	Joseph H. McCormick	1	12–2	.857
12	1941–1947 (Note: Mount St. Mary's did not field a team for the 1942–43 season due to World War II.); 1948*	Wally Opekun	6	50–34	.595
13	1947–1948 (Note: Filipowicz resigned in February 1948 to return to professional baseball. Wally Opekun served as interim head coach for the remainder of the 1947–48 season.)	Steve Filipowicz	1	7–8	.467
14	1948–1949	Michael Kennedy	1	10–10	.500
15	1949–1950	John McMahon	1	7–15	.318
16	1950–1951	Pete Caruso	1	19–13	.594
17	1951–1954	Bill Clarke	3	40–34	.541
18	1954–2003	Jim Phelan	49	830–524	.613
19	2003–2010	Milan Brown	7	95–120	.442
20	2010–2012 (Note: Burke was placed on administrative leave in February 2012. Matt Henry was named interim head coach while Burke was away. Burke resigned at the end of the 2011–12 season.)	Robert Burke	2	17–40	.298
–	2012*	Matt Henry	1	2–2	.500
21	2012–2018	Jamion Christian	6	101–95	.515
22	2018–2024	Dan Engelstad	6	72–109	.398
22	2024–present	Donny Lind		–	–
Totals		23 coaches	114 seasons	1,575–1,189	.570
Records updated through end of 2022–23 season * - Denotes interim head coach. Source
