= Frederic A. Morgan =

19th century American politician

Member of the Wisconsin State Assembly from the Winnebago 3rd district
- In office January 2, 1871 – January 1, 1872
- Preceded by: James H. Foster
- Succeeded by: Nelson F. Beckwith

Personal details
- Born: May 15, 1846 Pewaukee, Wisconsin Territory, U.S.
- Died: October 2, 1925 (aged 79) Bon Homme County, South Dakota, U.S.
- Resting place: Saint Leo Cemetery, Tyndall, South Dakota
- Party: Republican
- Spouse: Catherine Griffin (died 1931)
- Children: Ruth Morgan; (b. 1895; died 1895)
- Relatives: Charles Henry Morgan (brother)
- Occupation: Farmer

Military service
- Allegiance: United States
- Branch/service: United States Volunteers; Union Army
- Years of service: 1864
- Rank: Private, USV
- Unit: 39th Reg. Wis. Vol. Infantry
- Battles/wars: American Civil War

Frederic Arthur Morgan (May 15, 1846 – October 2, 1925) was an American farmer and Republican politician. He was a member of the Wisconsin State Assembly, representing Oshkosh in the 1871 session. He was one of the first members of the Wisconsin Legislature to have been born in the territory of Wisconsin.

== Background ==
Morgan was born May 15, 1846, in the town of Pewaukee, in Waukesha County, Wisconsin Territory. He attended public school, including some time at the high school in Fond du Lac. He moved with his parents to Black Wolf, Winnebago County, in 1851. During the American Civil War, he served as a private in Company I of the 39th Wisconsin Infantry Regiment. The 39th Wisconsin Infantry was a "100 day" regiment, with its members mustering into service in May 1864, and mustering out in September 1864.

== Public office ==
Morgan was a member of the town board of supervisors, of which he was elected chairman in 1868 and re-elected in 1869. In 1870, he was elected to the 3rd Winnebago County Assembly district (the Towns of Black Wolf, Nekimi, Nepeuskin, Omro, Poygan, Rushford, and Utica) for the 24th Wisconsin Legislature as a Republican, with 1,142 votes, against 69 write-ins (Republican incumbent James H. Foster was running for the Wisconsin Senate, and there was no Democratic or third party nominee). Morgan was the youngest member of the Assembly during that session. He was assigned to the standing committees on the militia and on contingent expenditures. After the legislature was redistricted, most of the old 3rd Winnebago County district was assigned to a new 4th District, which would be represented in 1872 by Republican Alson Wood. Black Wolf and Omro remained in a drastically revised 3rd District, which would go to Democrat Nelson Beckwith. Morgan was not a candidate for either district.

== Personal life and family ==
Frederic A. Morgan was the fourth of seven children born to Henry Culver Morgan and his wife Lurancy (née Swift). Henry C. Morgan came to Black Wolf, Wisconsin, with his brother, Charles, and had a successful lumber mill operating until the Panic of 1857. Charles Morgan served several years on the Winnebago County board and was twice an unsuccessful candidate for state legislature.

Frederic's eldest brother was Charles Henry Morgan, who served as an officer in the 21st Wisconsin Infantry Regiment. After the war, Charles moved to Missouri and was subsequently elected to five terms in the United States House of Representatives.

== Electoral history ==
=== Wisconsin Assembly (1870) ===
Wisconsin Assembly, Winnebago 3rd District Election, 1870
Party	Candidate	Votes	%	±%
General Election, November 8, 1870
Republican	Frederic A. Morgan	1,142	94.30%	
	Scattering	69	5.70%	
Total votes		1,211	100.0%	-23.35%
Republican hold				

Wisconsin State Assembly
Preceded by James H. Foster	Member of the Wisconsin State Assembly from the Winnebago 3rd district January 2, 1871 – January 1, 1872	Succeeded by Nelson F. Beckwith
