= Robert McCurdy (politician) =

19th century American politician

Member of the Wisconsin Senate from the 19th district
- In office January 6, 1873 – January 4, 1875
- Preceded by: James H. Foster
- Succeeded by: William P. Rounds

Personal details
- Born: April 16, 1836 Saint Patrick Parish, New Brunswick
- Died: July 13, 1896 (aged 60) Oshkosh, Wisconsin, U.S.
- Party: Republican
- Spouse: Catherine Vosburg (m. 1858)

Robert B. McCurdy (April 16, 1836 – July 13, 1896) was a Canadian American immigrant, businessman, and Republican politician. He was a member of the Wisconsin State Senate, representing Winnebago County during the 1873 and 1874 sessions, and served in several state government administrative roles.

== Background ==
McCurdy was born April 16, 1836, in the Saint Patrick Parish, New Brunswick, to Chandler and Rachel Simpson McCurdy. He came to Oshkosh with his parents in 1850, and settled there. He received a public school education, but left school at age 15, and went to work chopping timber and running an engine in a sawmill. On October 27, 1858, he married Catherine Vosburg, a native of Warren, New York. About the same time, he opened a grocery store. He became an active member of the Independent Order of Odd Fellows.

== Public service ==
He was elected as city treasurer in 1863, and worked three years in that job (1863-65). After a brief stint as a bookkeeper for a dry goods company, he worked another six years (1866-71) as the city's register of deeds. In 1872, he was elected to the Wisconsin's 19th State Senate district (Winnebago County) as a Republican, with 4,295 votes to 2,946 for Democrat Charles Weisbrod. He was assigned to the standing committees on town and county organization and on the state prison. In the spring of 1873, he opened an insurance agency.

In 1873, McCurdy introduced an early version of employer's liability for railroads which had been drafted for him by Judge Harlow S. Orton. (The bill passed, but was repealed in 1880.) He was not a candidate for re-election, and was succeeded by fellow Republican William Prentiss Rounds.

In January 1878 McCurdy became Assistant State Treasurer, and continued in that position until 1882. In 1881, he had been seriously discussed as a potential Republican nominee for State Treasurer, although he did not get the nomination; after the election, when his rival for the nomination was about to become his boss, he moved to the position of chief clerk for the secretary of state.

In 1890, McCurdy lost the Republican nomination for state insurance commissioner to David Schreiner, in part because Schreiner was a German-born Lutheran, and the Republican ticket was perceived as vulnerable because of the Bennett Law. It was agreed that if Schreiner won (which he did not), McCurdy would become assistant commissioner.

== Later years ==
After 1879, McCurdy sold his insurance agency and worked as an adjuster and an inspector in the insurance industry, and spent some time living in Appleton before returning to Oshkosh. He was credited with having written, and secured passage of, laws requiring building inspections of new construction, particularly their electrical wiring, in the region.

In June of 1891, he was badly injured in a railway accident from which he never recovered. When he died July 13, 1896, at his home in Oshkosh, newspaper reports attributed his death in part to the long-term effects of his injuries.

Wisconsin Senate
Preceded by James H. Foster	Member of the Wisconsin Senate from the 19th district January 6, 1873 – January 4, 1875	Succeeded by William P. Rounds
