= Marsh Giddings =

American politician (1816–1875)

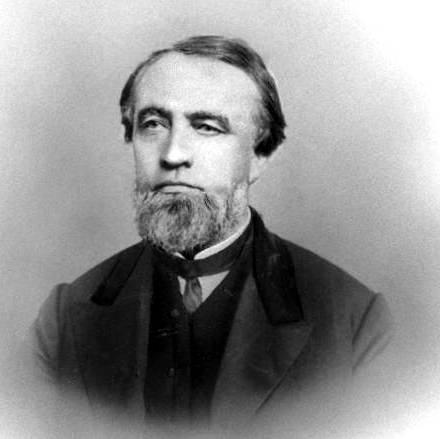
- Governor Giddings

8th Governor of New Mexico Territory
- In office 1871–1875
- Preceded by: William Anderson Pile
- Succeeded by: William G. Ritch (acting)

Personal details
- Born: 19 November 1816 Sherman, Connecticut
- Died: 3 June 1875 (aged 58) Santa Fe, New Mexico
- Party: Republican
- Occupation: politician

Marsh Giddings (19 November 1816 – 3 June 1875) was a politician from the U.S. state of Michigan, who was appointed as U.S. consul-general to India and later served as the governor of New Mexico Territory from 1871 to 1875.

== Early life ==
Giddings was born in Sherman, Connecticut, to William and Jane (Ely) Giddings, who moved to Kalamazoo County, Michigan when he was 13. In 1834, he entered Western Reserve college (which later became part of Case Western Reserve University), at Hudson, Ohio, but did not finish. When he was 21 he was elected as a Justice of the Peace for Richland Township, Kalamazoo County, Michigan. In 1836, he married Louisa Mills.

== Michigan politics ==
Giddings was elected as a member of the Michigan State House of Representatives from Kalamazoo County in 1849. He served as a probate judge in Michigan, 1860–68; a Presidential Elector for Michigan, 1864; a member of the Republican National Committee from Michigan, 1866–70; a delegate to Michigan state constitutional convention, 1867; and a delegate to Republican National Convention from Michigan in 1868.

== National politics ==
U.S. President Ulysses S. Grant nominated Giddings to be consul-general of the United States at Calcutta, India, 1870, as part of his patronage based spoils system. Giddings was paid, but never left Michigan. Some biographical sketches indicate that Giddings declined to go to India due to concerns about his health. Grant then nominated Giddings as Governor of New Mexico Territory, after Willard Warner had declined that post. Giddings took up his duties at the end of August 1871, although he was not confirmed by the United States Senate until later that December.

== New Mexico ==
Giddings was appalled by the violence and lawlessness in the territory. His first day in office he was confronted by a riot in Mesilla. When he requested troops to put down lawlessness in Cimarron, he was told that troops could be used in civil affairs only by a request from a U.S. Marshall or by orders from the president. The Lincoln County Wars started during his tenure, but he didn’t have the resources to suppress the lawlessness in southern New Mexico either. In January 1874 the best he could do was to offer a reward of $500 for the arrest of those cowboys who had shot up a Hispanic dance in Lincoln murdering four men, the seminal event starting the wars.

Giddings died in office, and Territorial Secretary William G. Ritch acted as governor for about two months until the inauguration of Samuel Beach Axtell. Giddings was a Congregationalist, and even though he died in Santa Fe, New Mexico his body was shipped back to Michigan and he was buried at the Mountain Home Cemetery in Kalamazoo.
