= Powers Moulton =

19th century American politician

Member of the Wisconsin State Assembly from the La Crosse 2nd district
- In office January 3, 1870 – January 1, 1872
- Preceded by: Nathan P. Waller
- Succeeded by: Gideon Hixon (whole county)

Personal details
- Born: August 9, 1829 Trenton, New York, U.S.
- Died: December 21, 1904 (aged 75) Onalaska, Wisconsin, U.S.
- Resting place: Onalaska City Cemetery, Onalaska, Wisconsin
- Party: Republican
- Occupation: Farmer

Military service
- Branch/service: United States Volunteers; Union Army
- Years of service: 1864–1865
- Rank: Corporal, USV
- Unit: 1st Reg. Wis. Heavy Artillery
- Battles/wars: American Civil War

Powers Gormer Moulton (August 9, 1829 – December 21, 1904) was an American farmer, Republican politician, and Wisconsin pioneer. He was a member of the Wisconsin State Assembly, representing La Crosse County during the 1870 and 1871 terms.

== Biography ==
Powers Moulton was born August 9, 1829, in Trenton, New York. He received a common school education in New York before moving west with his parents in 1846. They settled in Lake County, Illinois, where they were some of the earliest settlers at Waukegan. Through his father, he became involved in the Democratic Party in Illinois, but he and his father would later split with the party over slavery. They both became staunch Republicans after that party was established in the 1850s.

Some time in the late 1850s, Powers Moulton moved north into Wisconsin, and settled at the town of Onalaska, in La Crosse County. Shortly after his arrival, he was elected as a town assessor for 1859 and was re-elected in 1860. He was subsequently elected justice of the peace in 1862, and town treasurer in 1863.

In 1864, he volunteered for service in the Union Army during the fourth year of the American Civil War. He was enrolled as a private in the 1st Wisconsin Heavy Artillery Regiment and was later promoted to corporal. He served with the regiment in Virginia until the end of the war.

Upon his return, he was again elected justice of the peace in 1868 and 1871. During this time, he was also elected to two terms in the Wisconsin State Assembly, running on the Republican Party ticket. He served in the 1870 and 1871 sessions, representing La Crosse County's 2nd Assembly district, which then comprised the northern half of the county. His district was abolished in the 1871 redistricting act, and La Crosse resident Gideon Hixon was chosen as the Republican nominee for the county's sole Assembly district in 1871.

After leaving the Assembly, he was elected town chairman in 1874, and served another term as justice of the peace in 1881.

Powers Moulton died at his home in Onalaska, on December 21, 1904. He was buried at Onalaska City Cemetery.

== Personal life and family ==
Powers Moulton was one of six children born to Josiah Powers and his wife Chloe (née Greene). Chloe was a sister of Judge Powers Greene, a veteran of the War of 1812, and one of the pioneer settlers of South Bend, Indiana. Josiah Powers often used the title "colonel" due to a commission in the New York militia granted by Governor William L. Marcy in the 1830s.

The Moultons were direct descendants of Robert Moulton, a shipbuilder who emigrated to the Massachusetts Bay Colony from England in 1629.

Powers Moulton married Citana J. Hall of Vermont. They had ten children who all grew to maturity.

== Electoral history ==
=== Wisconsin Assembly (1869, 1870) ===
Wisconsin Assembly, La Crosse County 2nd District Election, 1869
Party	Candidate	Votes	%	±%
General Election, November 2, 1869
Republican	Powers Moulton	670	71.50%	
Democratic	Sever Anderson	267	28.50%	
Plurality		403	43.01%	
Total votes		937	100.0%	
Republican hold				

Wisconsin Assembly, La Crosse County 2nd District Election, 1870
Party	Candidate	Votes	%	±%
General Election, November 8, 1870
Republican	Powers Moulton (incumbent)	454	61.52%	−9.99%
Democratic	William Hartley	284	38.48%	
Plurality		170	23.04%	-19.97%
Total votes		738	100.0%	-21.24%
Republican hold				

Wisconsin State Assembly
Preceded by Nathan P. Waller	Member of the Wisconsin State Assembly from the La Crosse 2nd district January 3, 1870 – January 1, 1872	Succeeded by Gideon Hixon (whole county)
