= Mascoutin Valley State Trail =

- Length: 10.4 miles (16.7 km) (Berlin–Ripon); 9.7 miles (15.6 km) (Rosendale–Fond du Lac)
- Location: Wisconsin, United States

Mascoutin Valley State Trail is a rail trail in northeastern Wisconsin. The trail is used for walking, bicycling, horseback riding (except Green Lake County), and snowmobiling during the winter months. The trail can also be used for cross-country skiing and snowshoeing but the trail is not groomed and must be shared with snowmobiles. Numerous miles of snowmobile trails connect to the Mascoutin Valley State Trail.

The trail is approximately 20 miles (32 km) in total length divided into two sections, 10.4 miles (16.7 km) Berlin to Ripon and 9.7 miles (15.6 km) Rosendale to Fond du Lac. The trail surfaces are crushed limestone with some parts being grass and gravel. The trail is maintained by the counties of Fond du Lac, Winnebago, and Green Lake in conjunction with the Wisconsin Department of Natural Resources.

== West Trail ==
The west trail of Mascoutin Valley State Trail is maintained by the counties of Green Lake, Winnebago, and Fond du Lac. The northwest trailhead is located at County Highway F near South Street in Berlin (43°57′40″N 88°56′11″W). The trail can be accessed at midpoint near Rush Lake on Lake Road off County Highway E (43°55′37″N 88°50′14″W). The trail ends north of Ripon at the junction of County Highway E and Locust Road (43°51′59″N 88°49′51″W).

The west trail offers wildlife and nature viewing in the Berlin Fen State Natural Area in the town of Berlin, Green Lake County and in the Koro Railroad Prairie State Natural Area and the Rush Lake Marsh Area in the town of Nepeuskun, Winnebago County.

== East Trail ==
The east trail of the Mascoutin Valley State Trail is maintained by Fond du Lac County. The northwest trailhead is located in north Rosendale along State Highway 26 (43°48′52″N 88°40′30″W) and travels east to Fond du Lac. The trail ends at Rolling Meadows Drive and County Highway I in Fond du Lac (43°47′44″N 88°29′15″W).

The east trail offers wildlife and nature viewing in the Eldorado Marsh Wildlife Area of Fond du Lac County.
