= William A. Pile =

American politician (1829–1889)

William Anderson Pile
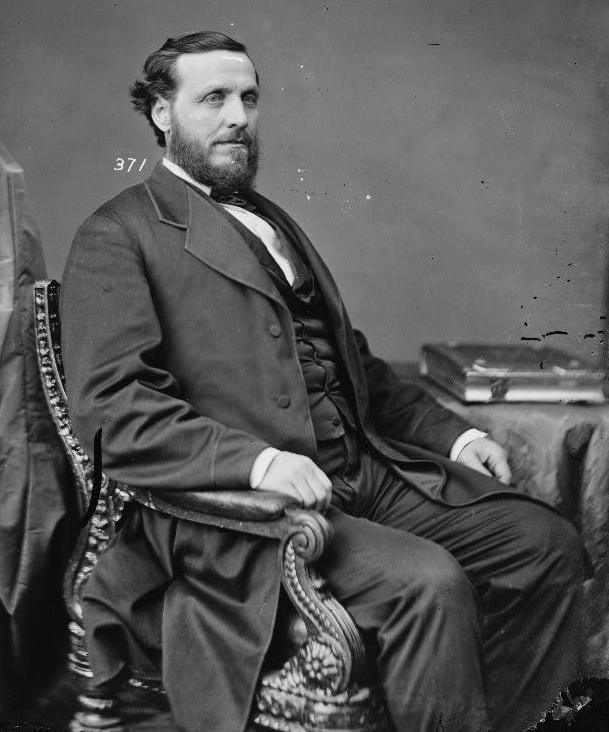

7th Governor of New Mexico Territory
- In office 1869–1871
- Preceded by: Robert B. Mitchell
- Succeeded by: Marsh Giddings

Member of the U.S. House of Representatives from Missouri's 1st district
- In office March 4, 1867 – March 3, 1869
- Preceded by: John Hogan
- Succeeded by: Erastus Wells

Personal details
- Born: February 11, 1829 Indianapolis, Indiana
- Died: July 7, 1889 (aged 60) Monrovia, California
- Party: Republican
- Profession: Politician, Minister

Military service
- Allegiance: Union
- Branch/service: Union Army
- Years of service: 1861–1865
- Rank: Brigadier General; Brevet Major General
- Commands: 33rd Missouri Infantry Regiment; Brigade, United States Colored Troops
- Battles/wars: American Civil War

William Anderson Pile (February 11, 1829 – July 7, 1889) was a nineteenth-century politician and minister from Missouri, as well as a general in the Union Army during the American Civil War. He was the governor of New Mexico Territory from 1869 to 1871 and the U.S. Ambassador to Venezuela from 1871 to 1874.

== Biography ==
Born near Indianapolis, Indiana, to father Jacob Pile and mother Comfort Williams, Pile completed preparatory studies, studied theology, became a minister in the Methodist Episcopal Church, and was a member of the Missouri conference. At the outbreak of the Civil War, he entered the Union Army as chaplain of the 1st Missouri Light Artillery Regiment in 1861, serving under Colonel Clinton B. Fisk. He was made captain, Battery I, 1st Missouri Light Artillery, on March 1, 1862, and promoted to lieutenant colonel of the 33rd Missouri Volunteer Infantry on September 5, 1862. He was promoted to the rank of colonel on December 23, 1862, then to brigadier general of volunteers in 1863. He commanded the Post of Port Hudson, District of Baton Rouge and Port Hudson, Department of the Gulf from December 26, 1864, to February 13, 1865; and commanded the 1st Brigade, 1st Division, United States Colored Troops, District of West Florida, Department of the Gulf from February 19 to April 25, 1865. He was promoted to brevet major general in 1865.

Details in records are unclear. Three of the regiment's batteries were at Fort Donelson, and apparently Pile was too. Made a battery commander, it is stated that he was at Shiloh; however, the records indicate that it was under the command of Lieutenant Charles H. Thurber. He was, however, in the Corinth, Mississippi, operations which followed. As an infantry commander, he fought at Devall's Bluff and took part in the Yazoo River expedition. Named a brigadier general, he took up recruiting duties in St. Louis and was not particularly concerned to whom–unionist or secessionist–the slaves he inducted belonged. After serving in a post command, he led a black brigade at Mobile. For the attack on Fort Blakely, he was brevetted major general, and he was mustered out on August 24, 1865.

Pile was elected as a Republican to the United States House of Representatives from Missouri in 1866, serving from 1867 to 1869, being unsuccessful for reelection in 1868. There, he served as chairman of the Committee on Expenditures in the Post Office Department from 1867 to 1869. Afterward, he was nominated to be Ambassador to Venezuela and Brazil by President Ulysses S. Grant in 1869, but his nomination was withdrawn and he was instead appointed Territorial Governor of New Mexico; he served from 1869 to 1871. Pile was successfully appointed Ambassador to Venezuela by President Grant in 1871, a post he held until 1874.

He moved to Monrovia, California, in 1886, and purchased a 50-acre property, where he grew wine grapes. The following year, he commissioned the renowned Northern California architects Samuel and Joseph Cather Newsom to design a house for him, the stately "Idlewild" house at 255 N. Mayflower Avenue. After serving for one year as mayor, he applied to be consul general in Melbourne, Australia, but contracted pneumonia that same year and died in Monrovia on July 7, 1889. He is buried, along with his son, William E. Pile, in Live Oak Cemetery, at 200 E. Duarte Road.

== Gallery ==
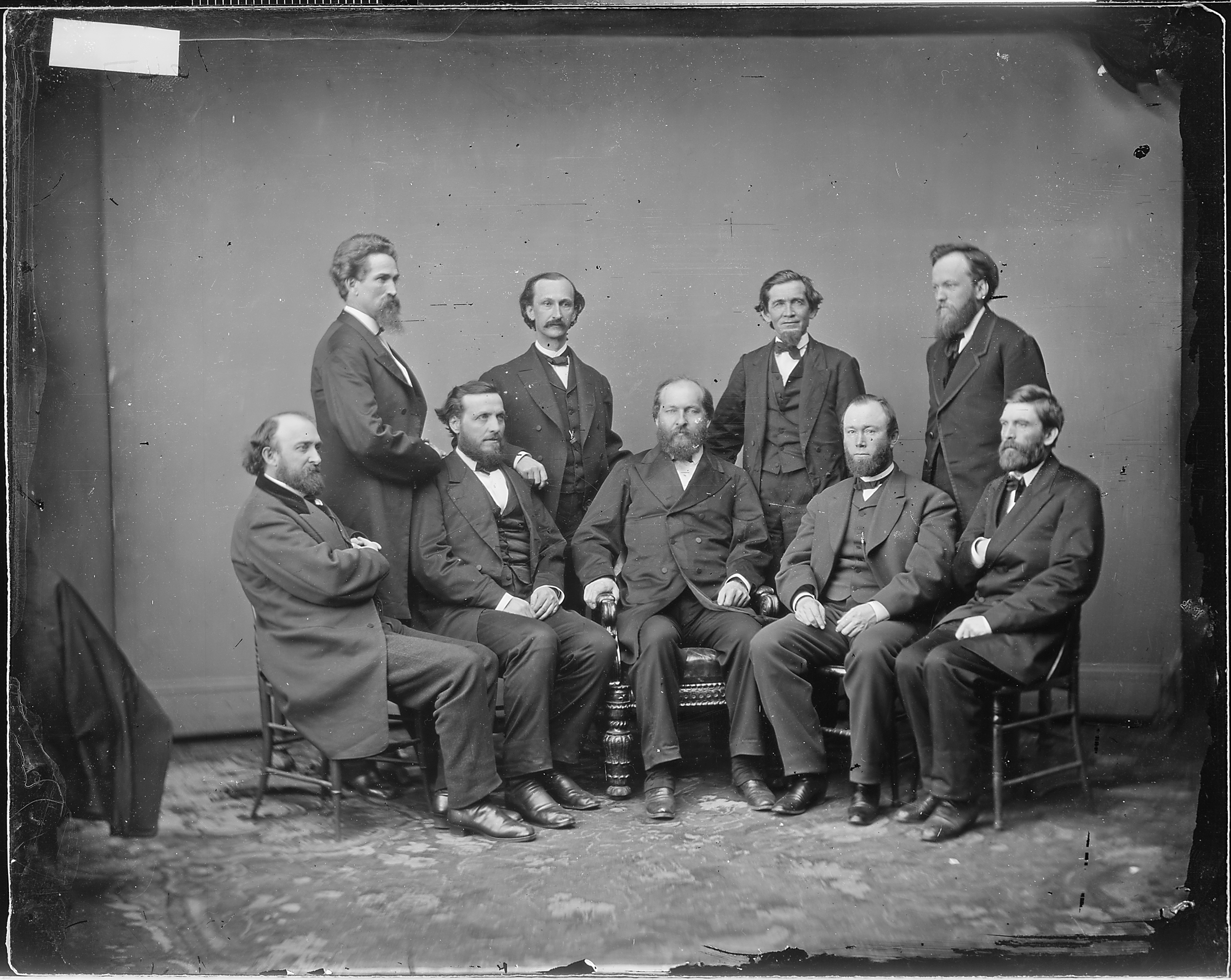
Courtesy of National Archives "James A Pyle" is William A Pile

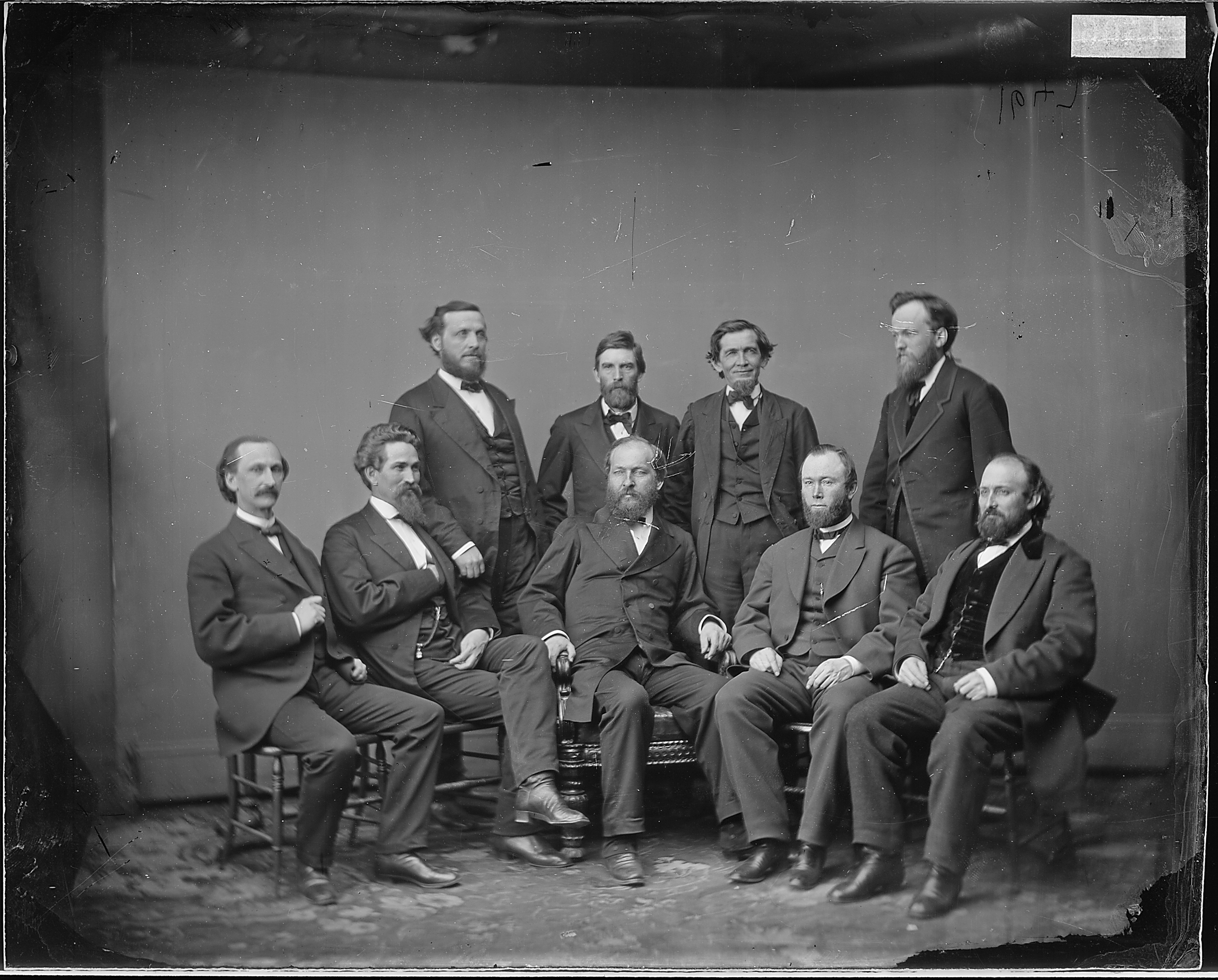
Courtesy of National Archives "James A Pyle" is William A Pile

Gen. Wm. A. Pile (Brady Copy Negative at LOC - mirrored)

== See also ==
- List of American Civil War generals (Union)

U.S. House of Representatives
Preceded by John Hogan	Member of the U.S. House of Representatives from Missouri's 1st congressional district March 4, 1867 – March 3, 1869	Succeeded by Erastus Wells
Political offices
Preceded by Robert B. Mitchell	Governor of New Mexico Territory; 1869–1871	Succeeded by Marsh Giddings
Diplomatic posts
Preceded by James R. Partridge	United States Minister to Venezuela; May 23, 1871 – January 9, 1874	Succeeded by Thomas Russell
