= David Schreiner =

American farmer, businessman, and politician

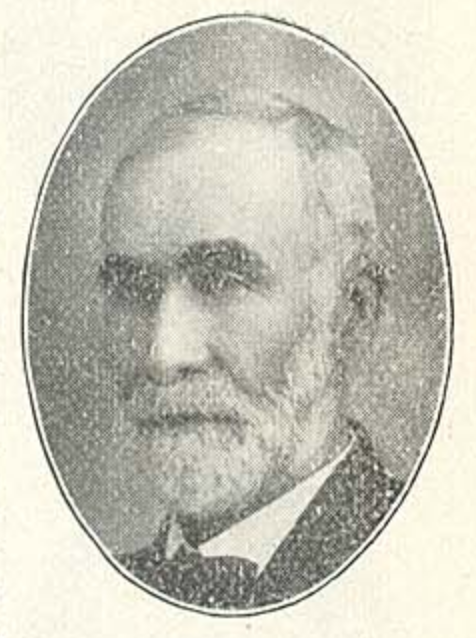
David Schreiner of Lancaster, Wisconsin

David Schreiner (December 21, 1842 – June 17, 1919) was an American farmer, businessman, and politician from Lancaster, Wisconsin.

== Background ==
Born in Dexbach, Grand Duchy of Hesse, Schreiner emigrated with his parents to the United States in 1855 and settled on a farm in Grant County, Wisconsin. During the American Civil War, Schreiner served in the 25th Wisconsin Volunteer Infantry Regiment and lost an arm during a battle. Schreiner was a farmer and was in the abstract titles, fire insurance, and real estate businesses.

== Public office ==
Schreiner served as town clerk and town treasurer. He also served on the Lancaster common council and was president of the board of education. Schreiner served as Wisconsin Circuit Court clerk for Grant County and as justice of the peace. He was the (unsuccessful) Republican nominee for state insurance commissioner in 1890, with his candidacy being supported by some over rival Robert McCurdy because Schreiner was a German-born Lutheran, and the Republican ticket was perceived as vulnerable over the Bennett Law.

In 1910, Schreiner was elected to the 2nd Grant County Wisconsin State Assembly district, with 1,910 votes to 958 for Democrat Michael McSpaden, 60 for Prohibitionist Frank Horsfall, and 58 for Social Democrat J. A. DeWitt. (Republican incumbent Henry E. Roethe was not a candidate). He was assigned to the standing committees on printing (which he chaired) and on charitable and penal institutions; and to the legislative visiting committee. Schreiner declined to be a candidate in 1912, and Roethe was returned to his old position.

== Last years ==
Schreiner died June 17, 1919, at his house in Lancaster after a long illness.
