= 33rd Missouri Infantry Regiment =

- Active: October 18, 1862 – August 10, 1865
- Country: United States
- Allegiance: Union
- Branch: Infantry
- Engagements: Yazoo Pass Expedition; Meridian Campaign; Red River Campaign; Battle of Pleasant Hill; Battle of Nashville; Battle of Fort Blakeley

The 33rd Missouri Infantry Regiment was an infantry regiment that served in the Union Army during the American Civil War.

== Service ==
The 33rd Missouri Infantry Regiment was organized at Benton Barracks August 29 through September 5, 1862 and mustered in for three-years service under the command of Colonel Clinton B. Fisk.

The regiment was attached to District of St. Louis, Missouri, Department of Missouri, to December 1862. 1st Brigade, 13th Division, XIII Corps, Department of the Tennessee, to February 1863. 2nd Brigade, 13th Division, XIII Corps, to July 1863. 2nd Brigade, 13th Division, XVI Corps, to August 1863. Garrison, Helena, Arkansas, Army of Arkansas, to January 1864. 1st Brigade, 4th Division, XVI Corps, Army of the Tennessee, January 1864. 3rd Brigade, 1st Division, XVI Corps, to March 1864. 3rd Brigade, 1st Division, XVI Corps, Department of the Gulf, to June 1864, and Department of the Tennessee, to December 1864. 3rd Brigade, 1st Division (detachment), Army of the Tennessee, Department of the Cumberland, to February 1865. 3rd Brigade, 1st Division, XVI Corps, Military Division West Mississippi, to August 1865.

The 33rd Missouri Infantry mustered out August 10, 1865.

== Detailed service ==
Ordered to the field in Missouri September 22, 1862, and operations in Phelps, Dent, Texas, and Wright Counties until December 19. Moved to St. Louis, then to Columbus, Kentucky, December 19–25, thence to Helena, Arkansas, January 5, 1863. Expedition to Duvall's Bluff, Arkansas, January 16–20. Expedition to Yazoo Pass, and operations against Fort Pemberton and Greenwood February 24 – April 8. Garrison duty at Helena, Arkansas, until January 28, 1864. Repulse of Holmes' attack on Helena July 4, 1863. Ordered to Vicksburg, Mississippi, January 28, 1864. Meridian Campaign February 3 – March 2. Red River Campaign March 10 – May 22. Fort DeRussy March 14. Occupation of Alexandria March 16. Henderson's Hill March 21. Battle of Pleasant Hill April 9. About Cloutiersville and Cane River Crossing April 22–24. At Alexandria, Louisiana, April 30 – May 13. Bayou La Mouri May 7. Retreat to Morganza May 13–20. Mansura May 16. Yellow Bayou May 18. Moved to Vicksburg, Mississippi, then to Memphis, Tennessee, May 22 – June 10. Old River Lake June 6. Smith's Expedition to Tupelo, Mississippi, July 5–21. Near Camargo's Cross Roads, Harrisburg, July 13. Tupelo July 14–15. Old Town Creek July 15. Smith's Expedition to Oxford August 1–30. Tallahatchie River August 7–9. Moved to Duvall's Bluff, Arkansas, September 3, then to Brownsville, Arkansas. March in pursuit of Price through Arkansas and Missouri to Cape Girardeau, Mo., September 17-October 9. Garrison at Tipton and California, Missouri, October 19 – November 17. Moved to St. Louis, Missouri, then to Nashville, Tennessee, November 24 – December 1. Battle of Nashville, Tennessee, December 15–16. Pursuit of Hood to the Tennessee River December 17–28. At Clifton, Tennessee, and Eastport, Mississippi, until February 1865. Moved to New Orleans, Louisiana, February 6–19. Campaign against Mobile, Alabama, and its defenses March 17 – April 12. Siege of Spanish Fort and Fort Blakely March 26 – April 8. Assault and capture of Fort Blakely April 9. Occupation of Mobile April 12. March to Montgomery April 13–25, then to Selma May 1, and duty there until July 20. Moved to St. Louis July 20 – August 3.

== Casualties ==
The regiment lost a total of 287 men during service; 4 officers and 52 enlisted men killed or mortally wounded, 2 officers and 229 enlisted men died of disease.

== Commanders ==
- Colonel Clinton B. Fisk
- Colonel William A. Pile

== See also ==
- Missouri Civil War Union units
- Missouri in the Civil War
