= 39th Wisconsin Infantry Regiment =

Union Army infantry regiment

- Flag of Wisconsin
- Active: June 3, 1864 – September 22, 1864
- Country: United States
- Allegiance: Union
- Branch: Infantry
- Size: Regiment
- Engagements: American Civil War: Second Battle of Memphis

Commanders
- Colonel: Edwin L. Buttrick

The 39th Wisconsin Infantry Regiment was an infantry regiment that served in the Union Army during the American Civil War. It was among scores of regiments that were raised in the summer of 1864 as Hundred Days Men, an effort to augment existing manpower for an all-out push to end the war within 100 days.

== Service ==
The 39th Wisconsin was organized at Milwaukee, Wisconsin, and mustered into Federal service on June 3, 1864. The 39th Wisconsin, along with the 40th and 41st, were ordered to the vicinity of Memphis, Tennessee, where they engaged in picket and guard duty, relieving veteran regiments which were sent to the front for the Atlanta campaign.

Their only combat occurred on August 21, 1864, when, in the early morning hours, a detachment of cavalry under Nathan Bedford Forrest raided Memphis, attempting—unsuccessfully—to capture the Union commanders stationed there in what is referred to as the Second Battle of Memphis.

The regiment was mustered out on September 22, 1864.

== Casualties ==
The 39th Wisconsin suffered 3 enlisted men killed or fatally wounded in action, and 1 officer and 27 enlisted men who died of disease, for a total of 31 fatalities.

== Commanders ==
- Edwin L. Buttrick (June 3, 1864 – September 22, 1864) mustered out with the regiment.

== Notable people ==
- George Clay Ginty was major of the regiment and later colonel of the 47th Wisconsin Volunteer Infantry Regiment. He earned an honorary brevet to brigadier general. After the war he served as a Wisconsin legislator and U.S. Marshall.
- Robert Graham was captain of Co. C. After the war he was Superintendent of Public Instruction of Wisconsin.
- Charles Hall was a private in Co. H. After the war, he served as a Wisconsin legislator.
- Frederic A. Morgan was a private in Co. I. After the war, he served as a Wisconsin legislator.
- Joseph V. Quarles was 1st Lieutenant in Co. C. After the war, he was mayor of Kenosha, Wisconsin, United States Senator, and a United States federal judge.
- Augustus Stinchfield was a private in Co. F. After the war, he was co-founder of the Mayo Clinic.

== See also ==
- List of Wisconsin Civil War units
- Wisconsin in the American Civil War
