= Samuel Beach Axtell =

American jurist and politician (1819–1891)

Samuel B. Axtell
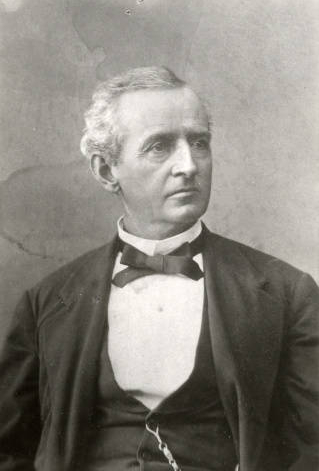
- Axtell in 1876

9th Governor of New Mexico Territory
- In office June 8, 1875 – September 4, 1878
- President: Ulysses S. Grant
- Preceded by: William G. Ritch (acting)
- Succeeded by: Lew Wallace

10th Governor of the Utah Territory
- In office February 2, 1875 – July 1, 1875
- Appointed by: Ulysses S. Grant
- Preceded by: George Lemuel Woods
- Succeeded by: George W. Emery

Member of the U.S. House of Representatives from California's 1st district
- In office March 4, 1867 – March 3, 1871
- Preceded by: Donald C. McRuer
- Succeeded by: Sherman Otis Houghton

Personal details
- Born: Samuel Beach Axtell; October 14, 1819 Franklin County, Ohio
- Died: August 6, 1891 (aged 71) Morristown, New Jersey
- Party: Democratic/Republican
- Occupation: Jurist and politician

Samuel Beach Axtell (October 14, 1819 – August 6, 1891) was an American jurist and politician. He is noted for serving as chief justice of the New Mexico Territorial Supreme Court, territorial governor of Utah and New Mexico, and a two-term representative from California.

== Early life ==
Axtell was born in Franklin County, Ohio, to a family of farmers. An ancestor was an officer in the American Revolutionary army and his grandfather was a Colonel of a New Jersey regiment during the War of 1812. He married Adaline S. Williams of Summit County, Ohio, September 20, 1840 and moved to Mt. Clemens, Michigan in 1843. Axtell was a graduate of the Western Reserve College at Oberlin, Ohio and was admitted to the bar in Ohio in the 1830s.

== Life in California ==
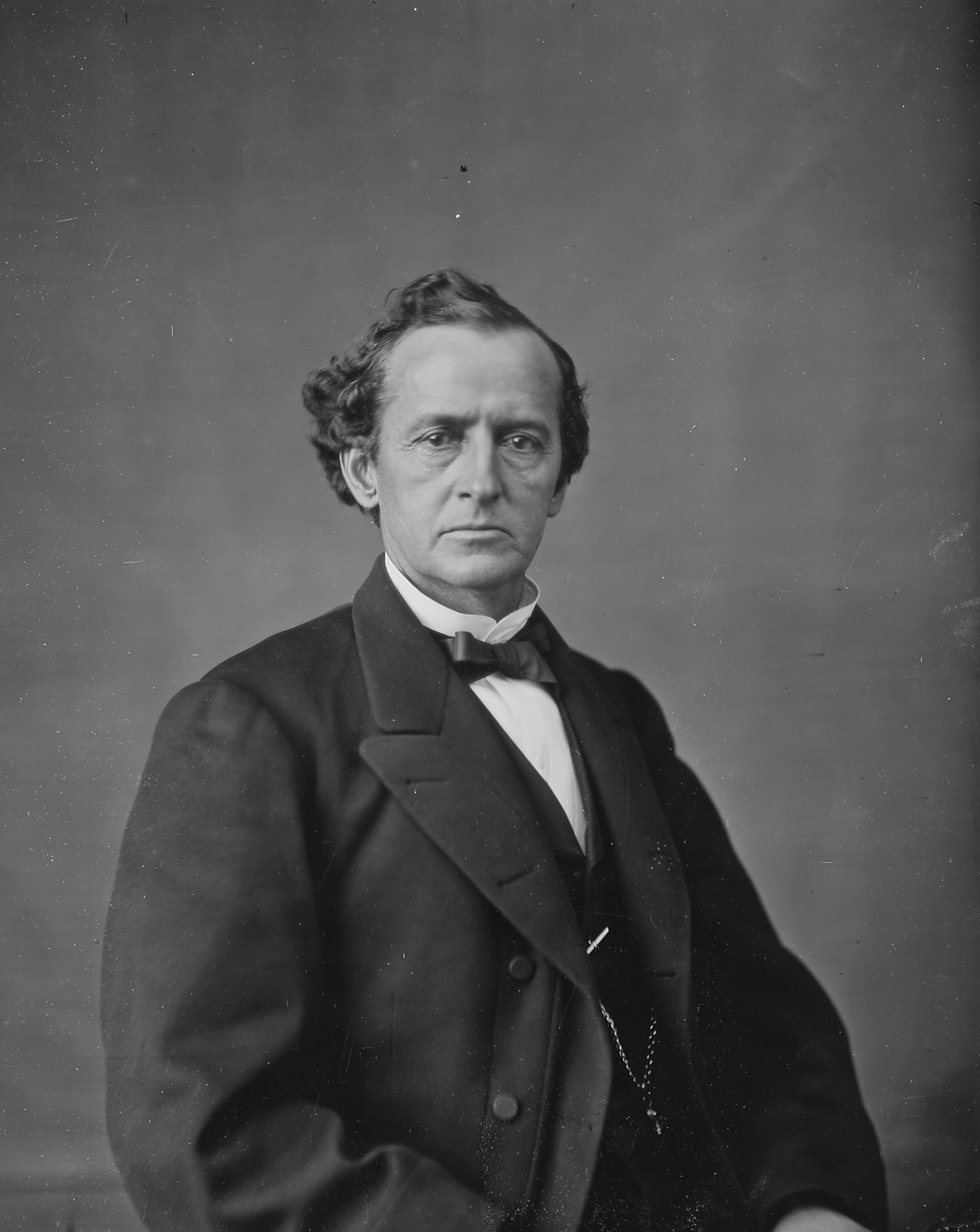
Portrait by Brady c. 1867–1871

In 1851, Axtell was caught up in the last days of the California Gold Rush. He moved to California and engaged in gold mining along the American River – in which he had little success. Upon the organization of California's counties he became interested in Politics and was elected district attorney of Amador County, holding this office for three terms. He moved to San Francisco in 1860, and was elected to the United States Congress as a Democrat, Representing California's First Congressional District in 1866 and re-elected 1868. He chose not to run for re-election and changed political parties to Republican.

== Territorial Governor ==
President Ulysses Grant tapped Axtell to be the Governor of the Utah Territory in 1874. Axtell left office in June 1875 amid criticism from anti-Mormon elements in the Territory. Grant subsequently appointed him Governor of the New Mexico Territory, and he was inaugurated on July 30, 1875. Axtell's administration is best remembered for an inept response to two outbreaks of frontier violence: the Colfax County War and Lincoln County War.

In Colfax County, a long-running land dispute between the Maxwell Land Grant Company and local settlers boiled over in late 1875 following the murder of small-holder spokesman Reverend F.J. Tolby. Up to 200 people died in subsequent violence pitting settler vigilantes against pro-Company gangs. Governor Axtell was closely associated with the pro-Company "Santa Fe Ring." In 1876, responding to pro-settler verdicts by local juries, he suspended Colfax County's judicial powers. Axtell also dispatched a company of U.S. Army soldiers to arrest settler leader Clay Allison and three of his allies.

In Lincoln County, a business rivalry grew into a cycle of revenge killings between partisans of "The House" owned by James Dolan (supported by the Jesse Evans Gang) and the Lincoln County Regulators supporting competing businesses run by John Tunstall and Alexander McSween. Governor Axtell intervened on behalf of The House, using his authority to remove pro-Regulator officials and shift legal authority to those supporting Dolan. This decision may have been influenced by the Attorney General of the New Mexico Territory, Thomas Catron, who held a mortgage on Dolan's property.

Accusations of corruption and misconduct led Secretary of the Interior Carl Schurz (R) to initiate an investigation into Axtell's activities as governor. Frank Angell, the investigating agent, would later describe Governor Axtell's administration as having more "corruption, fraud, mismanagement, plots and murder" than any other governor in the history of the United States. Based on Angell's investigation, Secretary Schurz suspended the Governor on September 4, 1878.

President Rutherford B. Hayes (R) then appointed General Lew Wallace to replace Axtell later that year.

== Chief justice ==
Despite his suspension, no criminal charges were brought against Axtell. He was later appointed chief justice of the New Mexico Territorial Supreme Court in 1882. He resigned in May 1885 after Grover Cleveland was elected president and planned to remove Axtell from the office.

In 1890 he was elected chairman of the New Mexico Territorial Republican Committee.

== Death ==
Axtell died in Morristown, New Jersey on August 6, 1891.

== Electoral history ==
1866 United States House of Representatives elections
Party	Candidate	Votes	%
Democratic	Samuel Beach Axtell	18,793	57.3
Republican	Timothy Guy Phelps	13,989	42.7
Total votes		32,782	100.0
Democratic gain from Republican			

1868 United States House of Representatives elections
Party	Candidate	Votes	%
Democratic	Samuel Beach Axtell (Incumbent)	23,632	54.1
Republican	Frank M. Pixley	20,081	45.9
Total votes		43,713	100.0
Democratic hold			

U.S. House of Representatives
Preceded by Donald C. McRuer	United States Representative for the 1st District of California; 1867–1871	Succeeded by Sherman O. Houghton
Political offices
Preceded by George Lemuel Woods	Governor of Utah Territory; 1875–1875	Succeeded by George W. Emery
Preceded by Marsh Giddings	Governor of New Mexico Territory; 1875–1878	Succeeded by Lew Wallace
