= Milo C. Bushnell =

19th century American politician

Chairman of the Board of Supervisors of Winnebago County, Wisconsin
- In office May 6, 1872 – November 11, 1873
- Preceded by: Henry P. Leavens
- Succeeded by: Lucas M. Miller

Member of the Wisconsin State Assembly from the Winnebago 3rd district
- In office January 7, 1867 – January 4, 1869
- Preceded by: William Simmons
- Succeeded by: James H. Foster

Personal details
- Born: May 2, 1824 Waitsfield, Vermont, U.S.
- Died: December 11, 1897 (aged 73) Omro, Wisconsin, U.S.
- Resting place: Omro Cemetery, Omro
- Party: Republican; Whig (before 1854)
- Spouses: Marcy Goss Taylor (m. 1851; died 1852); Mary Saloma Bidwell (m. 1853; died 1866); Mary Jane (Bradish) Shafer (m. 1867; died 1896)
- Children: with Mary Bidwell; Almeron C. Bushnell^{(b. 1854; died 1856)}; Abbie J. (Caswell)^{(b. 1857; died 1881)}; Linnie A. Bushnell^{(b. 1859; died 1899)}; Josie Bushnell^{(b. 1861)}; Milo C. Bushnell^{(b. 1866; died 1866)}; from Mary Bradish; Josephine Shafer (step-daughter)
- Occupation: Farmer, politician

Milo Cornelius Bushnell (May 2, 1824 – December 11, 1897) was an American farmer, Republican politician, and Wisconsin pioneer. He served two terms in the Wisconsin State Assembly, representing Winnebago County during the 1867 and 1868 terms. He was among the earliest American settlers at Omro, Wisconsin, and served as chairman of the Winnebago County board of supervisors during 1872 and 1873. His name was often abbreviated as M. C. Bushnell.

== Wisconsin pioneer ==
Milo C. Bushnell was born May 2, 1824, in the town of Waitsfield, Vermont. He was raised and educated there, working on his father's farm until about age 20. At that age, he went to work on another farm for pay; after accumulating $75 in savings, he went west to Illinois. After teaching school there for $11 per month over the winter, he went north into the Wisconsin Territory in 1846, and settled in the town of Omro, Wisconsin.

He became the first person to purchase land in the town of Omro, buying 120 acres at $1.25 per acre from the government. The land had a significant prairie stretch and did not require much clearing of trees; within a year, Bushnell had 43 acres of fenced land and 15 acres of wheat. In 1849, he built a house on the land—it was the second frame house erected in Omro, and the first to receive a coat of paint.

After eight years of improvements, he sold his farm for a profit in 1854, and moved to a new farm. There, he built a new house, and resided until 1866, when he sold again. After selling his second farm, he bought a 3-acre property in the village of Omro, where he raised apples and cultivated a plant nursery. His apples and apple trees became the primary source of his income for much of the rest of his life.

== Political career ==
Bushnell identified with the Whig Party when he first came to Wisconsin, but quickly became a staunch Republican when that party was established in 1854. As a Whig, he was elected assessor of Omro township in 1848, and was elected chairman of the town board in 1849, serving as an ex officio member of the county board. During the presidency of Abraham Lincoln, he was appointed U.S. assessor of internal revenue for the western half of Winnebago County, and continued holding the office under president Andrew Johnson, serving seven years.

In 1866, he was elected to the Wisconsin State Assembly in what was then Winnebago County's 3rd Assembly district. The district at that time comprised roughly the southwest quarter of Winnebago County. During his first term in the Assembly, he simultaneously held the offices of state representative, federal revenue assessor, and town chairman. After winning his second term in the Assembly, he resigned as federal revenue assessor, but was also elected to the local school board.

He ultimately served fifteen years on the county board, and was elected chairman of the county board in May 1872, serving until November 1873. He served 27 years on the school board, resigning in the mid-1890s, when he largely retired from public life.

== Personal life and family ==
Milo Bushnell was the second of five children born to Jedidiah Bushnell and his wife Abigail (née Taylor).

When he was first getting established in Wisconsin, Bushnell was still unmarried. His widowed sister Cornelia came to live with him in the late 1840s, to take care of his housekeeping, and ultimately recommended he get married. He returned to Vermont in 1851, where he met Marcy Goss Taylor. They married on September 18 of that year. They returned to Omro, but Marcy died just six months later, in April 1852.

In 1853, Bushnell married for a second time, this time to Mary Saloma Bidwell, of St. Lawrence County, New York. Together they had five children, but two died in infancy and one other died in childhood. Mary died in 1866, after 13 years of marriage.

Bushnell married for a third and final time in 1867, to Mrs. Mary Jane Shafer (née Bradish). He had no further children with his third wife, but became a step-father to her daughter, Josephine.

Milo C. Bushnell died at his home in Omro on December 11, 1897, after a brief illness. Only one of his biological children survived him, his daughter Linnie.

Wisconsin State Assembly
Preceded by William Simmons	Member of the Wisconsin State Assembly from the Winnebago 3rd district January 7, 1867 – January 4, 1869	Succeeded by James H. Foster
Political offices
Preceded by Henry P. Leavens	Chairman of the Board of Supervisors of Winnebago County, Wisconsin; May 6, 1872 – November 11, 1873	Succeeded by Lucas M. Miller
