= Charles Hall (Wisconsin politician) =

American politician

Charles Hall (24 September 1847 – 6 June 1909) was a member of the Wisconsin State Assembly.

== Biography ==
Hall was born in London, England in 1847. He later resided in De Pere, Wisconsin and Oconto, Wisconsin. During the American Civil War, he served with the 39th Wisconsin Volunteer Infantry Regiment of the Union Army.

== Political career ==
Hall was elected to the Assembly in 1886 and 1888. Other positions he held include President of the Oconto city council. He was a Republican.
