= Ira W. Fisher =

American politician (1833–1900)

Member of the Wisconsin Senate from the 21st district
- In office January 4, 1869 – January 2, 1871
- Preceded by: William G. Ritch
- Succeeded by: James H. Foster

Personal details
- Born: October 15, 1833 Addison, Vermont, U.S.
- Died: May 4, 1900 (aged 66) Minneapolis, Minnesota, U.S.
- Resting place: Lakewood Cemetery, Minneapolis, Minnesota
- Party: Republican
- Children: 2

Ira Willmarth Fisher (October 15, 1833 – May 4, 1900) was an American farmer, Republican politician, and Wisconsin pioneer. He was a member of the Wisconsin State Senate, representing Winnebago County in the 1869 and 1870 sessions.

== Biography ==
Ira W. Fisher was born in Addison, Vermont, in October 1833. He received a common school education, then moved to Wisconsin in 1858, settling at Menasha. He worked as a mill operator, and was one of the owners of the Star Mills, producing flour and livestock feed.

Fisher was elected to the Wisconsin State Senate in 1868, running on the Republican Party ticket. He represented all of Winnebago County during the 1869 and 1870 sessions. While serving in the Senate, in 1869, Fisher was appointed to the Governor's commission to investigate the state's charitable and benevolent institutions. He did not run for re-election in 1870.

In 1878, Fisher purchased a large farm in Casselton, Dakota Territory, and made that his primary residence for most of the rest of his life.

In 1899, Fisher moved in with his son, Walter, in Minneapolis, due to poor health. He died there after suffering a stroke on May 4, 1900. He was buried in Lakewood Cemetery.

== Electoral history ==
=== Wisconsin Senate (1868) ===
Wisconsin Senate, 21st District Election, 1868
Party	Candidate	Votes	%	±%
General Election, November 3, 1868
Republican	Ira W. Fisher	4,699	63.14%	
Democratic	John Hancock	2,743	36.86%	
Plurality		1,956	26.28%	
Total votes		7,442	100.0%	
Republican hold				

Wisconsin Senate
Preceded by William G. Ritch	Member of the Wisconsin Senate from the 21st district January 4, 1869 – January 2, 1871	Succeeded by James H. Foster
