= William G. Ritch =

American politician (1830–1904)

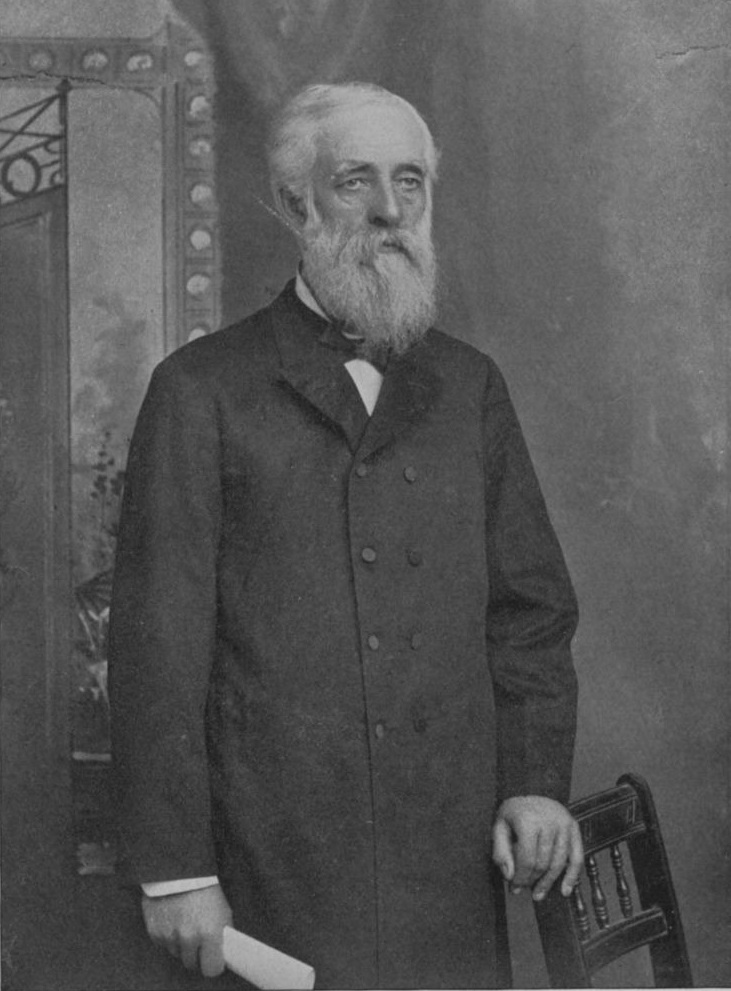

Acting Governor of New Mexico Territory
- In office June 3, 1875 – July 30, 1875
- Preceded by: Marsh Giddings
- Succeeded by: Samuel Beach Axtell

Member of the Wisconsin Senate from the 21st district
- In office January 6, 1868 – January 4, 1869
- Preceded by: George Gary
- Succeeded by: Ira W. Fisher

Personal details
- Born: May 4, 1830 Ulster County, New York
- Died: September 14, 1904 (aged 74) Engle, New Mexico
- Resting place: Santa Fe National Cemetery, Santa Fe, New Mexico
- Party: Republican
- Spouse: Olive Marion Babcock (died 1905)
- Children: Nellie (Scudder)^{(b. 1862; died 1920)}; Emma Amelia (Laderer)^{(b. 1864; died 1906)}; Watson L. Ritch^{(b. 1868; died 1950)}

Military service
- Allegiance: United States
- Branch/service: United States Volunteers (Union Army)
- Years of service: 1865
- Rank: First Lieutenant, USV
- Unit: 46th Reg. Wis. Vol. Infantry
- Battles/wars: American Civil War

William Gillett Ritch (May 4, 1830 – September 14, 1904) was an American public administrator, newspaper publisher, and Republican politician. Appointed Secretary of the New Mexico Territory by President Ulysses S. Grant in 1873, he also served briefly as acting governor of New Mexico Territory in the summer of 1875. Before relocating to New Mexico, he served one year in the Wisconsin State Senate, representing Winnebago County. In historical documents, his name is frequently abbreviated as W. G. Ritch, and his last name is sometimes misspelled as Rich.

== Early life and career ==
Ritch was born on May 4, 1830, in Ulster County, New York. He became interested in politics and served as county clerk of Ulster County, and clerk of the board of supervisors.

In 1855, he went west, settling first at Hudson, Michigan, and later at Oshkosh, Wisconsin. In Oshkosh, he served as clerk of the Wisconsin circuit court for Winnebago County from 1861 through 1865.

== Civil War service ==
In early 1865, he volunteered for service in the American Civil War and was enrolled as first lieutenant and adjutant of the 46th Wisconsin Infantry Regiment, under Colonel Frederick S. Lovell. The 46th Wisconsin Infantry was organized at Camp Randall and mustered into service March 1865. They were assigned to guard railroad and supply lines along the Nashville and Decatur Railroad, and did not engage in serious fighting. With the war ended, they were mustered out at Nashville, Tennessee, on September 27, 1865, and returned to Wisconsin.

== Wisconsin politics and publishing ==
Back in Wisconsin, Ritch became active as a supporter of Philetus Sawyer, who was then congressman for Wisconsin's 5th congressional district, which contained Winnebago County. When Sawyer secured a federal appointment for Winnebago County's state senator, George Gary, Ritch was elected as his successor in an 1867 special election. Ritch served only one year in the Wisconsin State Senate and did not seek reelection in 1868. He was, however, chosen as one of Wisconsin's 1868 presidential electors, casting his vote for Ulysses S. Grant.

In 1869, at the urging of Congressman Sawyer, Ritch relocated from Oshkosh to Neenah, Wisconsin, and purchased the Neenah Times newspaper. Sawyer and Ritch used the newspaper to advocate for the unpopular opinion of establishing a new state hospital for the insane on land near Oshkosh. The hospital, now known as Winnebago Mental Health Institute, began construction in 1871.

== New Mexico ==
In 1873, Sawyer obtained another federal appointment for Ritch, when President Grant appointed him Secretary of the New Mexico Territory. Ritch ultimately served thirteen years as Secretary of the Territory, and served several weeks as acting governor in 1875 following the death of Marsh Giddings. While acting governor, he encountered some controversy over his initial refusal to pay off the bounty hunter who shot down Billy the Kid, a decision that was eventually reversed. As Secretary, he contributed to the design of what would later become the Seal of New Mexico, and was an advocate for establishing a non-sectarian education system in the territory. He was also the first president of the New Mexico Historical Society, president of the territory's Bureau of Immigration, and the Educational Association of New Mexico.

Historical Society of New Mexico Inaugural address of Hon. W. G. Ritch, president; delivered before the Society, Feb. 21 1881, Santa Fé, New Mexico and Charter, Constitution, and Bylaws (readable pdf)

After retiring from public office, he continued to reside at Engle, New Mexico, and became a cattle ranch operator.

== Personal life and family ==
Ritch and his wife, Olive, had at least three children.

Ritch died at his home in Engle on September 14, 1904. Then-governor Miguel Antonio Otero issued a proclamation honoring Ritch, ordering flags to be flown at half-staff, and announcing that Ritch would lie in state at the territorial capital. He was buried with military honors at Santa Fe National Cemetery, in a ceremony organized by his comrades in the Independent Order of Odd Fellows. He was a prominent member of the Odd Fellows in New Mexico, and served a term as Grand Master of the state organization; he was also a member of the Knights Templar.

Wisconsin Senate
Preceded by George Gary	Member of the Wisconsin Senate from the 21st district January 6, 1868 – January 4, 1869	Succeeded by Ira W. Fisher
Political offices
Preceded by Marsh Giddings	Governor of New Mexico Territory; June 3, 1875 – July 30, 1875	Succeeded by Samuel Beach Axtell
