= Donald C. McRuer =

American politician (1826–1898)

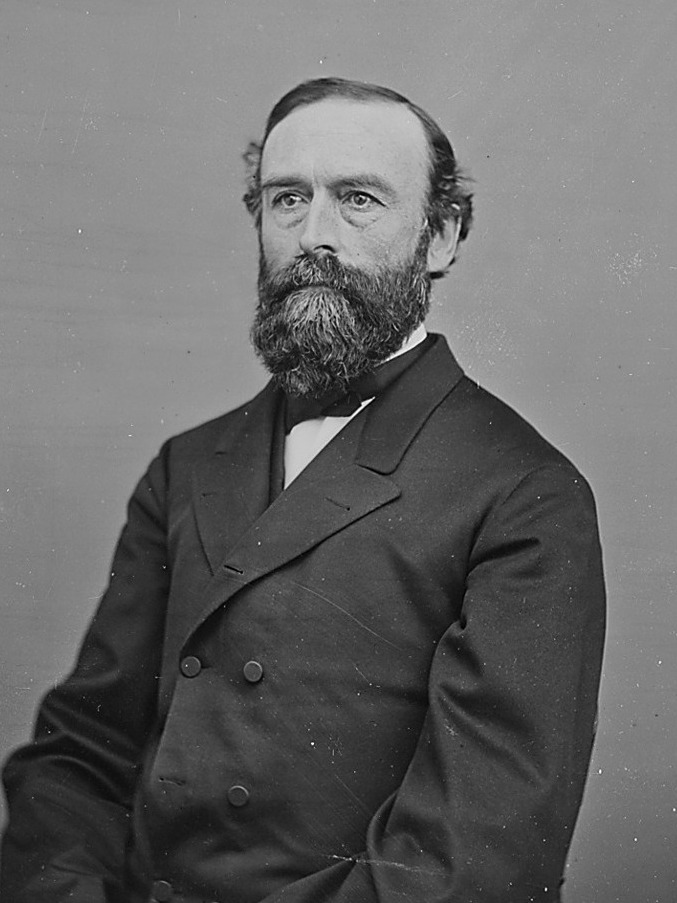
- Portrait by Brady c. 1860–1865

Member of the U.S. House of Representatives from California's 1st district
- In office March 4, 1865 – March 3, 1867
- Preceded by: District created
- Succeeded by: Samuel Beach Axtell

Personal details
- Born: Donald Campbell McRuer; March 10, 1826 Bangor, Maine
- Died: January 29, 1898 (aged 71) St. Helena, California
- Resting place: St. Helena Public Cemetery, St. Helena
- Party: Republican

Donald Campbell McRuer (March 10, 1826 – January 29, 1898) was a 19th-century American merchant and politician from the Republican Party who served one term as a U.S. representative from California's 1st district from 1865 to 1867.

== Biography ==
McRuer was born March 10, 1826, in Bangor, Maine. He moved to San Francisco, California in 1851 during the California Gold Rush and became a commission merchant. He was a member of the San Francisco Board of Education in 1859 and 1860.

During the Civil War, McRuer was a member of the United States Sanitary Commission.

=== Congress ===
He was elected as a Republican to the 39th United States Congress (1865–1867), but did not run for reelection.

=== Later career ===
McRuer traveled in Europe for two years, then returned to San Francisco. After his return he served as harbor commissioner for four years and served on the board of directors of the Security Savings Bank of San Francisco.

=== Death and burial ===
McRuer died January 29, 1898, in Saint Helena, California and is buried in Saint Helena Public Cemetery.

== Electoral history ==
1864 United States House of Representatives elections
Party	Candidate	Votes	%
Republican	Donald C. McRuer	20,370	58.9
Democratic	Joseph B. Crocker	14,191	41.1
Total votes		34,561	100.0
Republican hold			

U.S. House of Representatives
New district	Member of the U.S. House of Representatives from California's 1st congressional district March 4, 1865 – March 3, 1867	Succeeded by Samuel Beach Axtell
