= Joe Lawler =

American football and basketball coach

Biographical details
- Born: January 12, 1901; Jessup, Pennsylvania, U.S.
- Education: Catholic (DC) (LLB, 1924); Scranton (BA, 1926)

Playing career

Football
- 1920–1923: Catholic University

Basketball
- 1920–1924: Catholic University

Coaching career (HC unless noted)

Football
- 1927–1934: Jessup HS (PA)
- 1935–1936: Mount St. Mary's

Basketball
- 1935–1937: Mount St. Mary's

Joseph J. Lawler (born January 12, 1901) was an American football and basketball coach and assistant postmaster general of the United States Postal Service.

He served as the head football and basketball coach at Mount Saint Mary's University in Emmitsburg, Maryland during the 1935–36 and 1936-37 seasons. After leaving coaching, he served in a number of roles in the USPS.
