= Nepeuskun, Wisconsin =

- Town
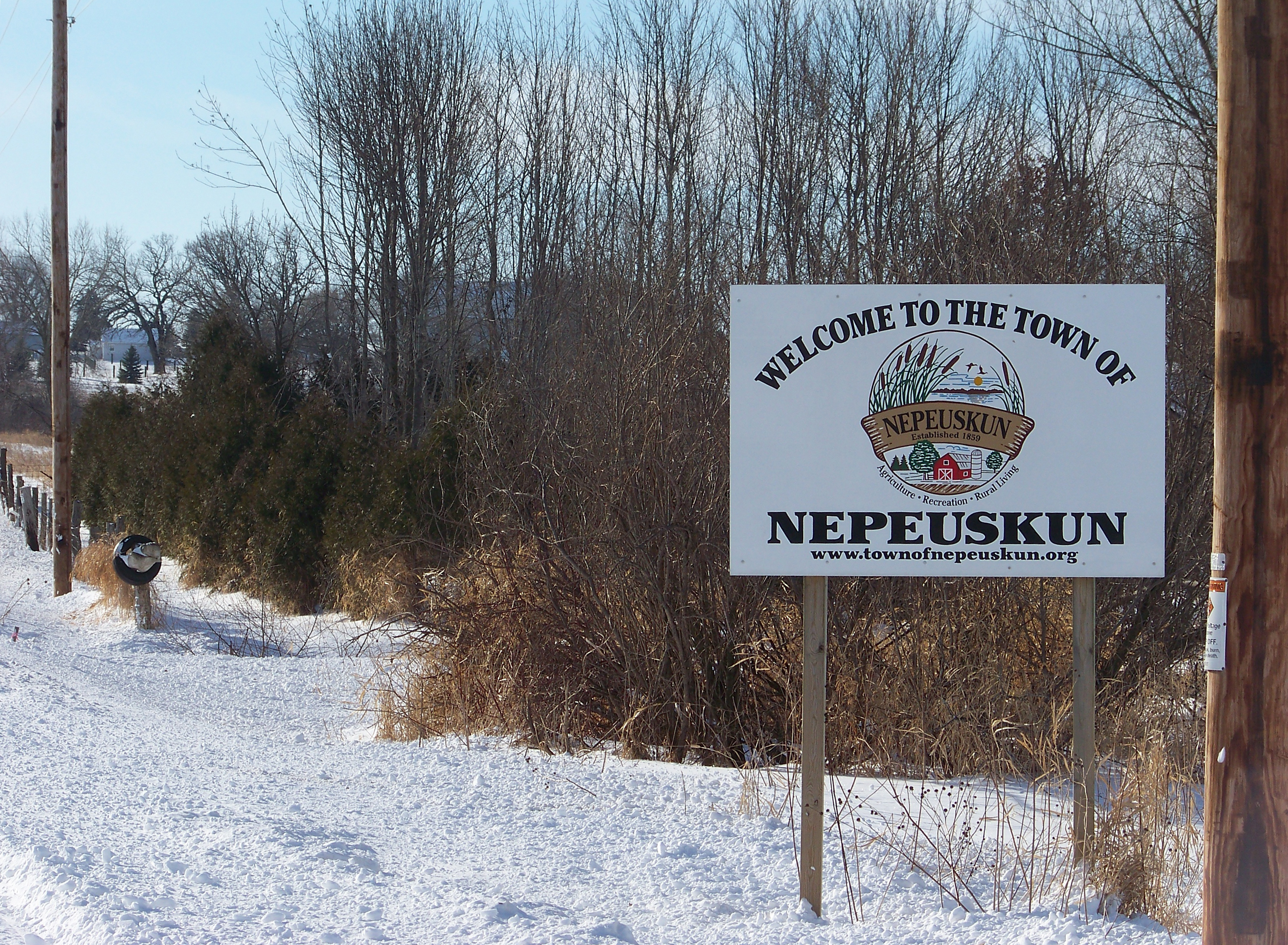
- Entering Nepeuskun heading south on Cty E

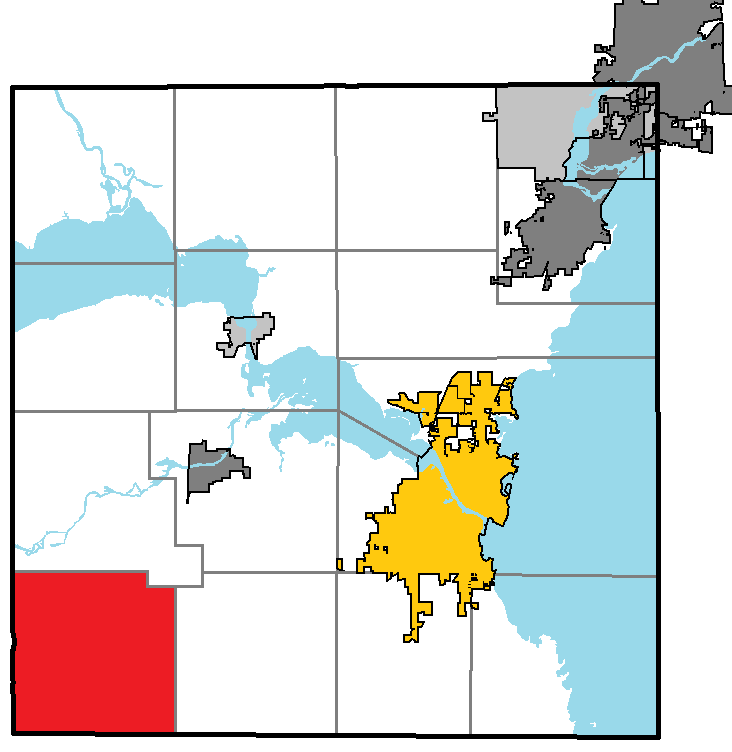
- Location of Nepeuskun, within Winnebago County
- Coordinates: 43°56′41″N 88°49′37″W
- Country: United States
- State: Wisconsin
- County: Winnebago

Area
  - Total: 36.2 sq mi (93.7 km^{2})
  - Land: 31.7 sq mi (82.0 km^{2})
  - Water: 4.5 sq mi (11.7 km^{2})
- Elevation: 830 ft (253 m)

Population (2020)
  - Total: 724
  - Density: 22.9/sq mi (8.83/km^{2})
- Time zone: UTC-6 (Central (CST))
  - Summer (DST): UTC-5 (CDT)
- Area code: 920
- FIPS code: 55-56100
- GNIS feature ID: 1583793
- Website: townofnepeuskun.gov

Nepeuskun, sometimes called Nepeuskin, is a town in Winnebago County, Wisconsin, United States. The population was 724 at the 2020 census. The unincorporated communities of Koro and Rush Lake are located in the town.

== Geography ==
According to the United States Census Bureau, the town has a total area of 36.2 square miles (93.7 km^{2}), of which 31.7 square miles (82.0 km^{2}) is land and 4.5 square miles (11.7 km^{2}), or 12.50%, is water.

== Demographics ==
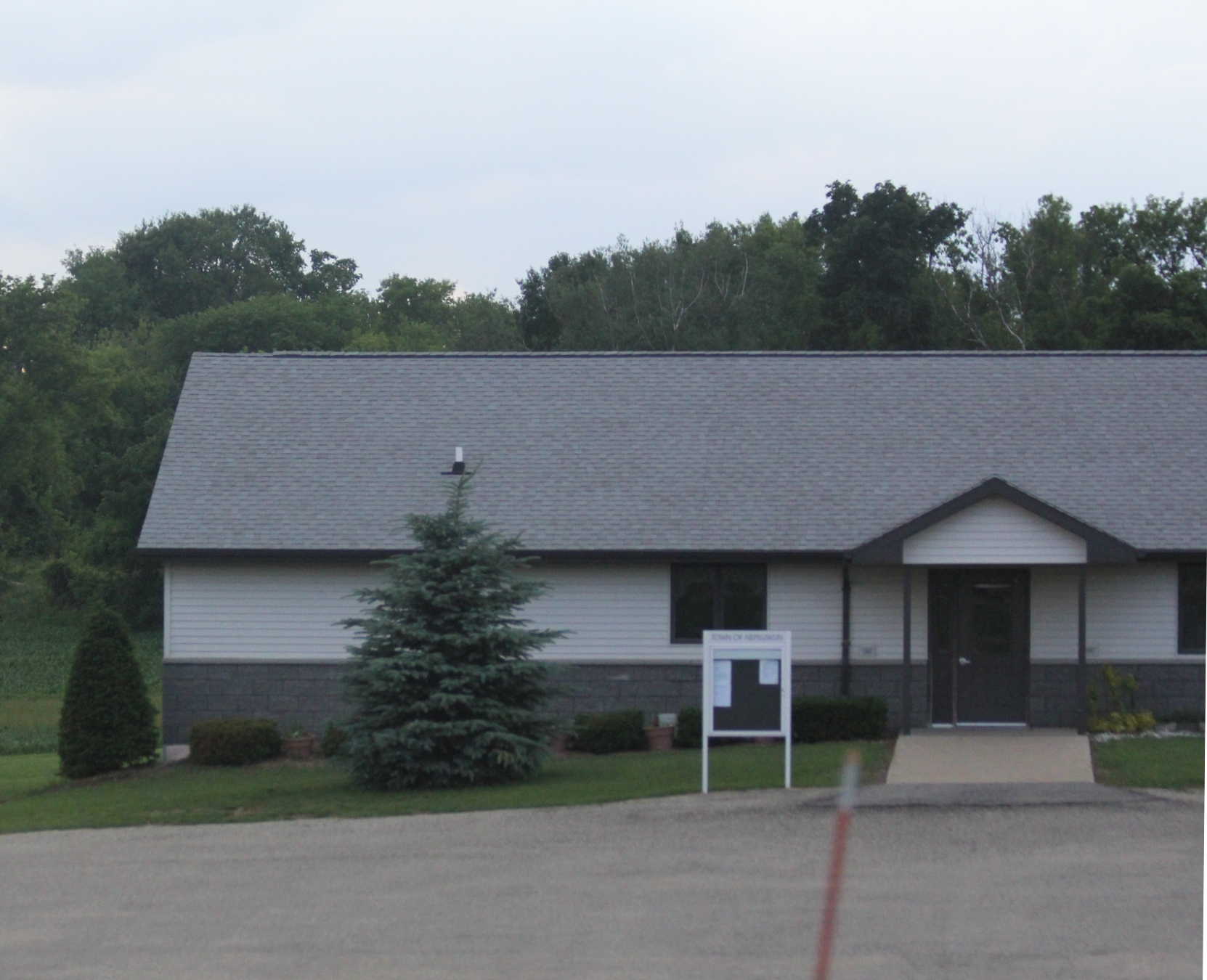
Town hall

As of the census of 2000, there were 689 people, 254 households, and 198 families residing in the town. The population density was 21.6 people per square mile (8.3/km^{2}). There were 275 housing units at an average density of 8.6 per square mile (3.3/km^{2}). The racial makeup of the town was 98.98% White, 0.15% African American, 0.58% from other races, and 0.29% from two or more races. Hispanic or Latino of any race were 0.87% of the population.

There were 254 households, out of which 36.2% had children under the age of 18 living with them, 71.7% were married couples living together, 2.4% had a female householder with no husband present, and 22.0% were non-families. 17.3% of all households were made up of individuals, and 9.1% had someone living alone who was 65 years of age or older. The average household size was 2.71 and the average family size was 3.08.

In the town, the population was spread out, with 27.0% under the age of 18, 7.0% from 18 to 24, 28.6% from 25 to 44, 23.4% from 45 to 64, and 14.1% who were 65 years of age or older. The median age was 38 years. For every 100 females, there were 104.5 males. For every 100 females age 18 and over, there were 105.3 males.

The median income for a household in the town was $47,344, and the median income for a family was $51,500. Males had a median income of $36,719 versus $20,714 for females. The per capita income for the town was $19,390. About 1.9% of families and 2.9% of the population were below the poverty line, including 1.9% of those under age 18 and 5.6% of those age 65 or over.

== Education ==
Nepeuskun residents receive primary education from three school districts, Berlin Area School District, School District of Omro, and Ripon Area School District.

== Recreation ==
- Koro Railroad Prairie State Natural Area features a stretch of high-quality mesic prairie with many species of native prairie plants. The mesic prairie's location at the northeastern edge of the prairie-oak savanna region in Wisconsin makes it especially noteworthy.
- Mascoutin Valley State Trail (formerly Rush Lake Trail) runs through the town of Nepeuskun. Trail activities include horseback riding, hiking, bicycling, snowmobiling, and wildlife viewing in the Rush Lake Marsh area.
- Nepeuskun offers two public access points to Rush Lake.
1. East Landing is a gravel boat landing located off County Road M.
2. North Access is a gravel boat landing located off Osborne Road.
- Nepeuskun Anti-Horse Thief Association serves oyster stew at its annual dinner meeting.
