= Koro, Wisconsin =

- Unincorporated community
- Location within Wisconsin Location within the United States
- Coordinates: 43°58′05″N 88°50′40″W
- Country: United States
- State: Wisconsin
- County: Winnebago
- Elevation: 830 ft (250 m)
- Time zone: UTC-6 (Central (CST))
  - Summer (DST): UTC-5 (CDT)
- Area code: 920
- GNIS feature ID: 1567619

Koro is an unincorporated community located in the town of Nepeuskun, Winnebago County, Wisconsin, United States. The Koro post office was established in August 1850 by its first postmaster, James H. Foster (who would go on to serve in the Wisconsin State Assembly and Wisconsin Senate). This is the only community by this name in the United States.
