= Rush Lake (Wisconsin) =

Lake in the state of Wisconsin, United States

- Location within Wisconsin Location within the United States
- Location: Winnebago County, Fond du Lac County, Wisconsin
- Coordinates: 43.934258°N 88.801134°W
- Basin countries: United States
- Surface area: 2,729 acres (11.04 km^{2})
- Average depth: 1.5 feet (0.46 m)
- Max. depth: 5 ft (1.5 m)
- Surface elevation: 820 feet (250 m)
- Settlements: Rush Lake

Rush Lake is a lake located in Winnebago County and Fond du Lac County, Wisconsin.

== Size and Shape ==
Rush Lake is roughly shaped like an inverted triangle; the lake is widest at its north end. It covers an area of 2,729 acres (11.04 km^{2}), and reaches a maximum depth of 5 feet (1.5 m). The lake is rather shallow, with an average depth of only 1.5 feet (0.46 m).

== Location ==
Rush Lake is mainly located in Winnebago County, about 18 miles (29 km) southwest of Oshkosh. Only the southern most point is in Fond du Lac County near Wilmoore Heights.
