= Rush Lake, Wisconsin =

- Unincorporated community
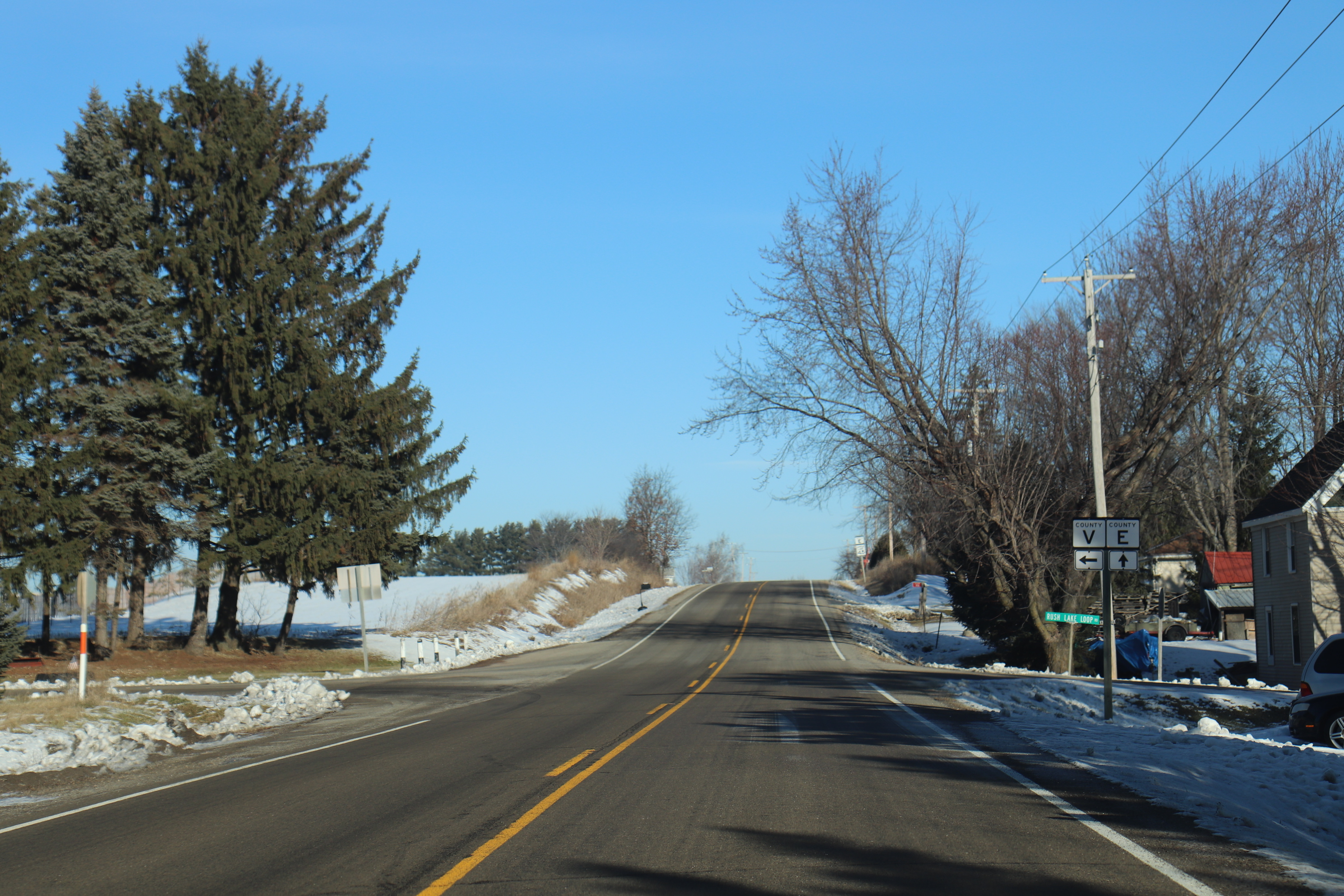
- intersection of County E & V in Rush Lake

- Location within Wisconsin Location within the United States
- Coordinates: 43°55′26″N 88°50′21″W
- Country: United States
- State: Wisconsin
- County: Winnebago
- Elevation: 853 ft (260 m)
- Time zone: UTC-6 (Central (CST))
  - Summer (DST): UTC-5 (CDT)
- Area code: 920
- GNIS feature ID: 1572741

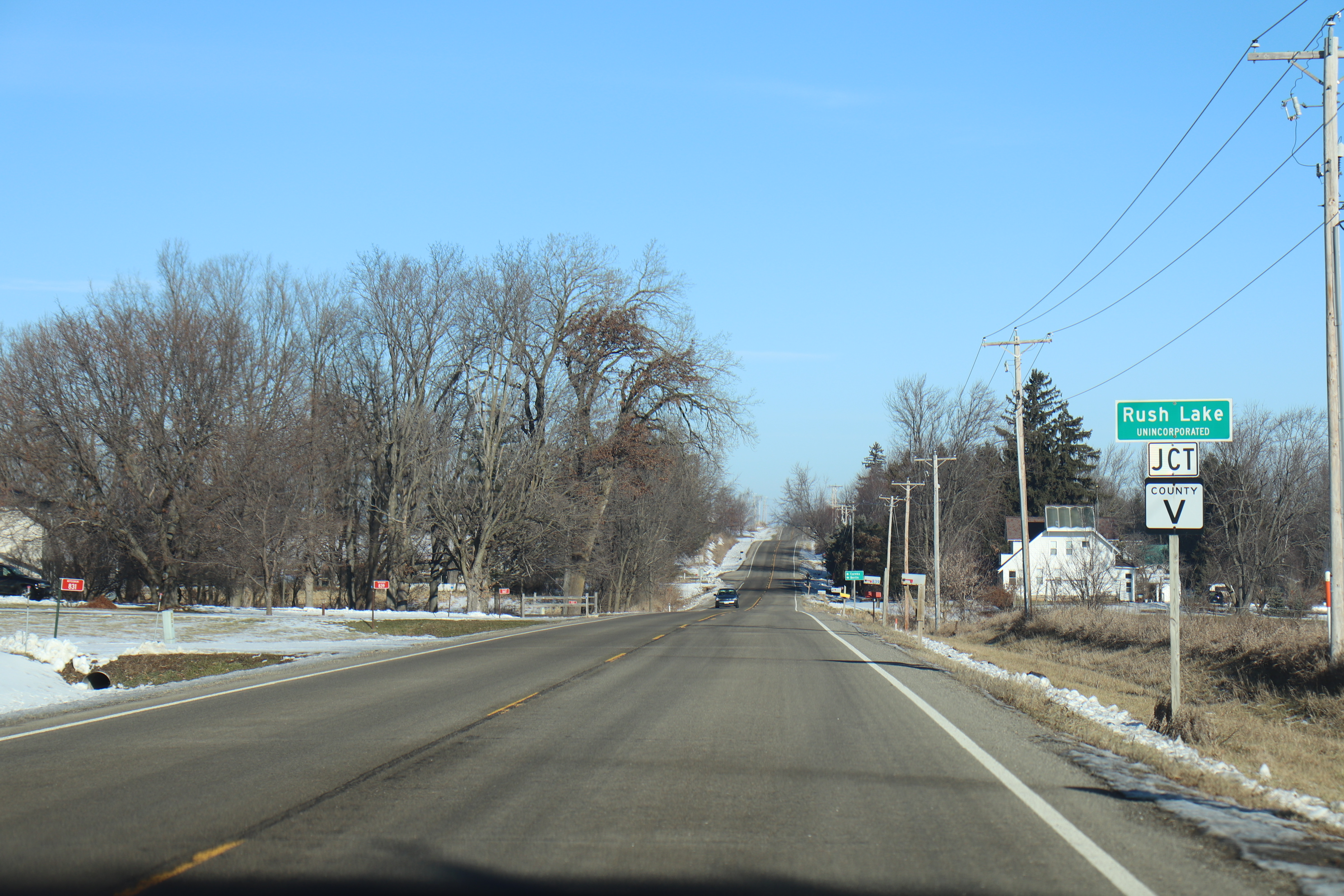
Sign for Rush Lake

Rush Lake is an unincorporated community located in the town of Nepeuskun, Winnebago County, Wisconsin, United States. Rush Lake is located at the junction of County Highways E and V, 5.5 miles (8.9 km) north of Ripon. Rush Lake is located to the east of the community, and the Mascoutin Valley State Trail passes through Rush Lake.
