= William M. Griswold =

19th century American politician

Member of the Wisconsin Senate
- In office January 1, 1872 – January 6, 1873
- Preceded by: Myron Reed
- Succeeded by: Evan O. Jones
- Constituency: 27th Senate district
- In office January 4, 1869 – January 1, 1872
- Preceded by: Robert B. Sanderson
- Succeeded by: Waldo Flint
- Constituency: 25th Senate district

Chairman of the Board of Supervisors of Columbia County, Wisconsin
- In office January 1871 – January 1872
- Preceded by: A. J. Turner
- Succeeded by: A. J. Turner

Member of the Wisconsin State Assembly from the Columbia 2nd district
- In office January 4, 1858 – January 7, 1861
- Preceded by: Oliver C. Howe
- Succeeded by: Nathan Hazen

Personal details
- Born: February 7, 1823 Salisbury, Herkimer County, New York, U.S.
- Died: October 10, 1889 (aged 66) Columbus, Wisconsin, U.S.
- Cause of death: Cancer
- Resting place: Hillside Cemetery, Columbus, Wisconsin
- Party: Republican
- Spouse: Mary A. Sofield (died 1935)
- Children: infant son; (b. 1870; died 1870)
- Education: Union College
- Profession: Lawyer

William M. Griswold (February 7, 1823 – October 10, 1889) was an American lawyer, Republican politician, and Wisconsin pioneer. He served four years in the Wisconsin State Senate and three years in the State Assembly, representing Columbia County.

== Early life ==
Born in Salisbury, Herkimer County, New York, Griswold graduated from Union College in 1844, and studied law with Judge Arphaxed Loomis in Little Falls, New York. He was admitted to the bar in 1850, at Schenectady, and then practiced law for three years as a junior partner to Loomis. He moved west to Wisconsin in 1853, and settled at Columbus, in Columbia County, Wisconsin.

== Career ==
In Columbus, he worked for several years in a mercantile trade with his older brother, George. He then devoted himself to cultivating his farm.

Griswold was elected to three consecutive terms in the Wisconsin State Assembly, running on the Republican Party ticket. He represented Columbia County's 2nd Assembly district, which then comprised the southeast portion of the county.

He was subsequently elected to two terms in the Wisconsin State Senate, in 1868 and 1870, representing all of Columbia County. He declined renomination in 1872. Additionally, he was a member of the board of supervisors of Columbia County for four terms, and was chairman of the county board in 1871.

== Personal life and death ==
William M. Griswold was the last child of Amos Griswold and his first wife Martha (née Munson). William's older brother, George Griswold, was his business partner for several years. Their younger half-brother, Eugene S. Griswold, came to live and work with them in Columbus, Wisconsin, in the 1850s.

William Griswold married Mary Sofied of Yates County, New York, in July 1868. They had two children, William and Mary.

Griswold died of cancer at his home in Columbus at the age of 66.

== Electoral history ==
=== Wisconsin Senate (1868, 1870) ===
Wisconsin Senate, 25th District Election, 1868
Party	Candidate	Votes	%	±%
General Election, November 3, 1868
Republican	William M. Griswold	3,854	66.97%	
Democratic	Amplias Chamberlin	1,901	33.03%	
Plurality		1,953	33.94%	
Total votes		5,755	100.0%	
Republican hold				

Wisconsin Senate, 25th District Election, 1870
Party	Candidate	Votes	%	±%
General Election, November 8, 1870
Republican	William M. Griswold (incumbent)	2,291	63.11%	−3.85%
Democratic	Frederick C. Curtis	1,339	36.89%	
Plurality		952	26.23%	-7.71%
Total votes		3,630	100.0%	-36.92%
Republican hold				

Wisconsin State Assembly
Preceded by Oliver C. Howe	Member of the Wisconsin State Assembly from the Columbia 2nd district January 4, 1858 – January 7, 1861	Succeeded by Nathan Hazen
Wisconsin Senate
Preceded by Robert B. Sanderson	Member of the Wisconsin Senate from the 25th district January 4, 1869 – January 1, 1872	Succeeded by Waldo Flint
Preceded by Myron Reed	Member of the Wisconsin Senate from the 27th district January 1, 1872 – January 6, 1873	Succeeded by Evan O. Jones
Political offices
Preceded by A. J. Turner	Chairman of the Board of Supervisors of Columbia County, Wisconsin; January 1871 – January 1872	Succeeded by A. J. Turner
