= Azel W. Patten =

American politician

Azel Wilder Patten (October 20, 1828 – January 15, 1902) was an American manufacturer and politician.

Born in Billerica, Massachusetts, Patten moved to Neenah, Wisconsin in 1856 and was in the flour mill and lumber business. Later, Patten was involved with the paper-making business. In 1870, Patten served on the Winnebago County Board of Supervisors, in 1870, and was a Democrat. Patten then served in the Wisconsin State Assembly in 1872. Patten died at his home in Appleton, Wisconsin.
