= William P. Rounds =

19th century American politician

Member of the Wisconsin Senate from the 19th district
- In office January 4, 1875 – January 1, 1877
- Preceded by: Robert McCurdy
- Succeeded by: Return Torrey

Member of the Wisconsin State Assembly from the Winnebago 2nd district
- In office January 3, 1870 – January 1, 1872
- Preceded by: George W. Trask
- Succeeded by: Azel W. Patten

Personal details
- Born: August 15, 1827 Bridgton, Maine, U.S.
- Died: August 5, 1905 (aged 77) Fox Crossing, Wisconsin, U.S.
- Resting place: Oak Hill Cemetery, Neenah, Wisconsin
- Party: Republican
- Spouse: Anne Eliza Northrup (m. 1854–1905)
- Children: Lillian F. Rounds^{(b. 1860; died 1942)}; Harriet C. Rounds^{(b. 1868; died 1921)}; Edith P. (Smith)^{(b. 1875; died 1921)}; (Mrs. A. H. Grout); E. W. Rounds
- Occupation: Flour and grain-dealer, paper manufacturer

William Prentiss Rounds (August 15, 1827 – August 5, 1905) was an American businessman, Republican politician, and Wisconsin pioneer. He was a member of the Wisconsin State Senate (1875 & 1876) and State Assembly (1870 & 1871), representing Winnebago County.

== Biography ==
William P. Rounds was born in Bridgton, Maine, in August 1827. He received a common school education and came to the Wisconsin Territory in 1845, settling in Milton, in Rock County. He moved north to Menasha in 1849, where he served in several local offices.

He was elected to the Wisconsin State Assembly in 1869, running on the Republican ticket and was subsequently re-elected in 1870. He did not run again in 1871. He represented Winnebago County's 2nd Assembly district, which then comprised roughly the northern-most quarter of the county.

Following the Peshtigo fire, in October 1871, he was active in the recovery and relief efforts, and was responsible for disbursing donated funds and goods.

In 1874, he was elected to the Wisconsin State Senate, representing all of Winnebago County.

Later in life, he was involved in the paper manufacturing business and was president of two paper mills in Menasha; he was also a director of the first national bank of Menasha until his death.

He died after a long illness in August 1905, at his home in Fox Crossing, Wisconsin.

== Electoral history ==
=== Wisconsin Assembly (1869, 1870) ===
Wisconsin Assembly, Winnebago 2nd District Election, 1869
Party	Candidate	Votes	%	±%
General Election, November 2, 1869
Republican	William P. Rounds	885	58.65%	
Democratic	William M. Stewart	624	41.35%	
Plurality		261	17.30%	
Total votes		1,509	100.0%	
Republican hold				

Wisconsin Assembly, Winnebago 2nd District Election, 1870
Party	Candidate	Votes	%	±%
General Election, November 8, 1870
Republican	William P. Rounds (incumbent)	997	62.78%	+4.14%
Democratic	I. L. Doton	591	37.22%	
Plurality		406	25.57%	+8.27%
Total votes		1,588	100.0%	+5.24%
Republican hold				

=== Wisconsin Senate (1874) ===
Wisconsin Senate, 19th District Election, 1874
Party	Candidate	Votes	%	±%
General Election, November 3, 1874
Republican	William P. Rounds	4,051	54.06%	−5.25%
Reform	Armine Pickett	3,442	45.94%	
Plurality		609	8.13%	-10.50%
Total votes		7,493	100.0%	+3.48%
Republican hold				

Wisconsin State Assembly
Preceded by George W. Trask	Member of the Wisconsin State Assembly from the Winnebago 2nd district January 3, 1870 – January 1, 1872	Succeeded by Azel W. Patten
Wisconsin Senate
Preceded by Robert McCurdy	Member of the Wisconsin Senate from the 19th district January 4, 1875 – January 1, 1877	Succeeded by Return Torrey
