= Myron Reed (politician) =

19th century American politician

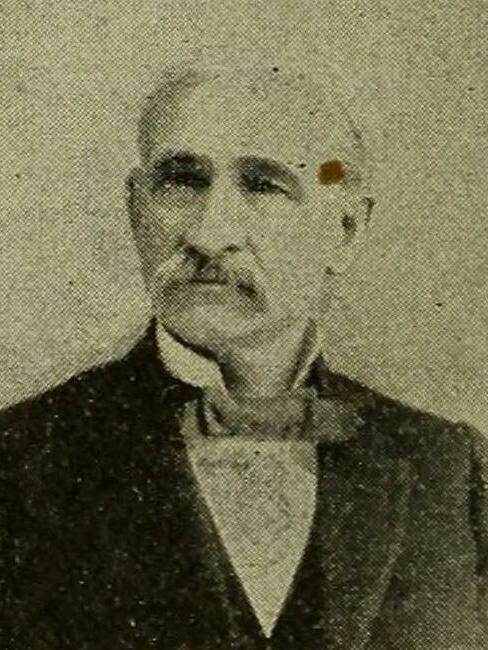

2nd Mayor of Waupaca, Wisconsin
- In office April 1876 – April 1877
- Preceded by: Charles Wright
- Succeeded by: Charles Wright

Member of the Wisconsin Senate
- In office January 1, 1872 – January 6, 1873
- Preceded by: James H. Foster
- Succeeded by: Myron H. McCord
- Constituency: 21st Senate district
- In office January 2, 1871 – January 1, 1872
- Preceded by: Charles M. Webb
- Succeeded by: William M. Griswold
- Constituency: 27th Senate district

Personal details
- Born: September 19, 1836 Massena, New York, U.S.
- Died: October 9, 1907 (aged 71) Minneapolis, Minnesota, U.S.
- Resting place: Lakeside Memorial Park, Waupaca, Wisconsin
- Party: Democratic
- Children: Joseph Myron Reed^{(b. 1870; died 1941)}; (Mrs. William H. Weed)^{(died after 1923)}
- Education: Albany University
- Profession: Lawyer

Myron H. Reed (September 19, 1836 – October 9, 1907) was an American lawyer, Democratic politician, and Wisconsin pioneer. He was the 2nd mayor of Waupaca, Wisconsin, and represented that area in the Wisconsin State Senate during the 1871 and 1872 sessions.

== Biography ==
Reed was born on September 19, 1836, in Massena, New York. He received an academic education at Union Academy in Belleville, New York, and graduated from the law school at Albany University in 1858. The following year, he moved to Waupaca, Wisconsin, where he became a junior partner to Milan H. Sessions in his legal practice. Their partnership continued until 1870, when they faced off as opponents for election to the Wisconsin State Senate.

Reed was a member of the Democratic Party, and was elected to the Wisconsin Senate from Wisconsin's 27th State Senate district, which then comprised Marathon, Portage, Waupaca, and Wood counties. He defeated Sessions in the November 1870 election, receiving 55% of the vote. He was nominated for another term in the Senate in 1872, but declined the nomination.

He was active in the government of the village of Waupaca, and after it was incorporated as a city, in 1875, he was elected as the second mayor of the city, serving from April 1876 through April 1877. He also served on the city council and county board.

He left Waupaca County in 1889 and moved north to Superior, Wisconsin, where he remained for much of the rest of his life. In his final years, he retired to a home on Lake Nebagamon, in Douglas County, Wisconsin.

After an illness of several months, he was taken to Minneapolis, Minnesota, for care at the home of his son. He died there on October 9, 1907.

== Personal life and family ==
Myron Reed was survived by his wife and two children.

He was prominent in Freemasonry in Wisconsin and was grand master of the state for two terms.

== Electoral history ==
=== Wisconsin Senate (1870) ===
Wisconsin Senate, 27th District Election, 1870
Party	Candidate	Votes	%	±%
General Election, November 8, 1870
Democratic	Myron Reed	3,461	55.78%	
Republican	Milan H. Sessions	2,744	44.22%	
Plurality		717	11.56%	
Total votes		6,205	100.0%	
Democratic hold				

Wisconsin Senate
Preceded by Charles M. Webb	Member of the Wisconsin Senate from the 27th district January 2, 1871 – January 1, 1872	Succeeded by William M. Griswold
Preceded by James H. Foster	Member of the Wisconsin Senate from the 21st district January 1, 1872 – January 6 1873	Succeeded by Myron H. McCord
Political offices
Preceded by Charles Wright	Mayor of Waupaca, Wisconsin; April 1876 – April 1877	Succeeded by Charles Wright
