= Joseph H. McCormick =

American football, basketball, and baseball coach

Joseph McCormick
Biographical details
- Education: Colby College (1915)

Coaching career (HC unless noted)

Football
- 1931–1934: Dickinson
- 1937–1938: Mount St. Mary's

Basketball
- 1937–1938: Mount St. Mary's

Head coaching record
- Overall: 15–27–7 (football); 12–2 (basketball)

Joseph H. McCormick was an American football, basketball, and baseball coach. He served as the head football coach at Dickinson College from 1931 to 1934 and at Mount St. Mary's University from 1937 to 1938, compiling a career college football head coaching record of 15–27–7. McCormick was also the head basketball coach at Mount St. Mary's for the 1937–38 season, tallying a 12–2 mark. McCormick graduated from Colby College in 1915.

== Coaching career ==
McCormick was the 22nd head football coach at Dickinson College in Carlisle, Pennsylvania. He held that position for four seasons, from 1931 until 1934, compiling a record of 10–16–6. Highlights included a 10–6 victory in 1931 over Penn State.

== Head coaching record ==
=== Football ===
Year	Team	Overall	Conference	Standing	Bowl/playoffs
Dickinson Red and White (Eastern Pennsylvania Collegiate Conference) (1931–1934)
1931	Dickinson	4–2–2	1–2–1	4th	
1932	Dickinson	1–6	0–4	5th	
1933	Dickinson	2–4–2	0–3–1	5th	
1934	Dickinson	3–4–2	1–2–1	4th	
Dickinson:		10–16–6	2–11–3		
Mount St. Mary's Mountaineers (Independent) (1937–1938)
1937	Mount St. Mary's	4–4–1			
1938	Mount St. Mary's	1–7			
Mount St. Mary's:		5–11–1			
Total:		15–27–7			
