= Joseph McCormick (politician and soldier) =

19th century American politician

Member of the Wisconsin State Assembly from the Door–Kewaunee district
- In office January 2, 1871 – January 1, 1872
- Preceded by: Charles L. Harris
- Succeeded by: Gideon Winans Allen

Member of the Indiana House of Representatives from the Fountain district
- In office December 5, 1842 – December 4, 1843 Serving with John Stewart
- Preceded by: Edward A. Hannegan
- Succeeded by: John R. Jones
- In office December 3, 1838 – December 7, 1840 Serving with Thomas J. Evans (1838–1839) & Jas. P. Carlton (1839–1840)
- Preceded by: Thomas J. Evans & James Carlton
- Succeeded by: Davis Newel & Solomon Clark

Personal details
- Born: April 8, 1787 Wyoming, Pennsylvania, U.S.
- Died: August 26, 1875 (aged 88) Ahnapee, Wisconsin, U.S.
- Resting place: Evergreen Cemetery, Algoma, Wisconsin
- Party: Democratic
- Spouses: Mary Hatfield (m. 1806; died 1862); second wife
- Children: John Harris McCormick^{(b. 1808; died 1890)}; Marcus McCormick^{(b. 1812; died 1892)}; (Mrs. E. A. Shebley)

Military service
- Allegiance: United States
- Branch/service: United States Army
- Years of service: 1812–1816
- Rank: Major, USA
- Battles/wars: War of 1812

Joseph McCormick (April 18, 1787 – August 26, 1875) was an American farmer, pioneer, and Democratic politician. He was a member of the Indiana House of Representatives and the Wisconsin State Assembly. During his term in the Wisconsin Assembly, he was the oldest serving legislator in the country. Earlier in his life, he served as a United States Army officer in the War of 1812.

== Biography ==
Joseph McCormick was born in April 1787 in Wyoming, Pennsylvania. When he was two years old, he moved with his parents to Steuben County, New York, where he was raised and educated. He apprenticed as a river boat pilot, and began running lumber on the Cohocton, Chemung, and Susquehanna rivers all the way to Chesapeake Bay.

At the outbreak of the War of 1812, he volunteered for service in the United States Army and was enrolled as a captain of infantry. He participated in many of the battles of the Niagara Frontier, including the Siege of Fort Erie. He was subsequently promoted to major and resigned his position in 1816, after the end of the war.

He moved to Lawrenceville, Pennsylvania, in 1816, and worked in lumber and general merchandise trade until 1829. From there, he moved to Louisville, Kentucky, and then to Covington, Indiana, in 1832. In Indiana, he was appointed postmaster at the community of Rob Roy, by President Andrew Jackson. During this time, he also became the owner of a steam ship, the Detroit, which he ran from Louisville and St. Louis to southern ports on the Mississippi River. During his frequent trips to the south, he became invested in the new state of Texas and was elected to serve as a delegate for the framing of the Texas constitution. However, that same year he had been elected to serve in the Indiana House of Representatives, and therefore had to decline participation in the Texas convention. He ultimately served three terms in the Indiana House, representing Fountain County.

In 1844, he moved west to Warren County, Illinois, then north to Wisconsin in 1848. He resided for a time at Manitowoc, Wisconsin, and was described as one of the first Americans to visit the site that would later become Algoma, Wisconsin. He wanted to begin a settlement there, but could not gather a company to join him in the new site, so remained at Manitowoc. He then moved to Forestville, Wisconsin, in Door County, where he lived for 8 years.

He moved to Ahnapee, Wisconsin, in 1868, and from that county he was elected to the Wisconsin State Assembly in the 1870 election. Since the adjournment of the 1871 session, he lived in retirement at his home.

Around 1872 he was thrown from a horse-drawn buggy and seriously injured. He never fully regained his health after that injury, and died at his home in Ahnapee on August 26, 1875.

Indiana House of Representatives
Preceded by Thomas J. Evans & James Carlton	Member of the Indiana House of Representatives from the Fountain district December 3, 1838 – December 7, 1840; Served alongside: Thomas J. Evans (1838–1839) & Jas. P. Carlton (1839–1840)	Succeeded by Davis Newel & Solomon Clark
Preceded by Edward A. Hannegan	Member of the Indiana House of Representatives from the Fountain district December 5, 1842 – December 4, 1843; Served alongside: John Stewart	Succeeded by John R. Jones
Wisconsin State Assembly
Preceded by Charles L. Harris	Member of the Wisconsin State Assembly from the Door–Kewaunee district January 2, 1871 – January 1, 1872	Succeeded by Gideon Winans Allen
