= 40th Wisconsin Legislature =

Wisconsin legislative term for 1891-1892

←	39th	41st	→
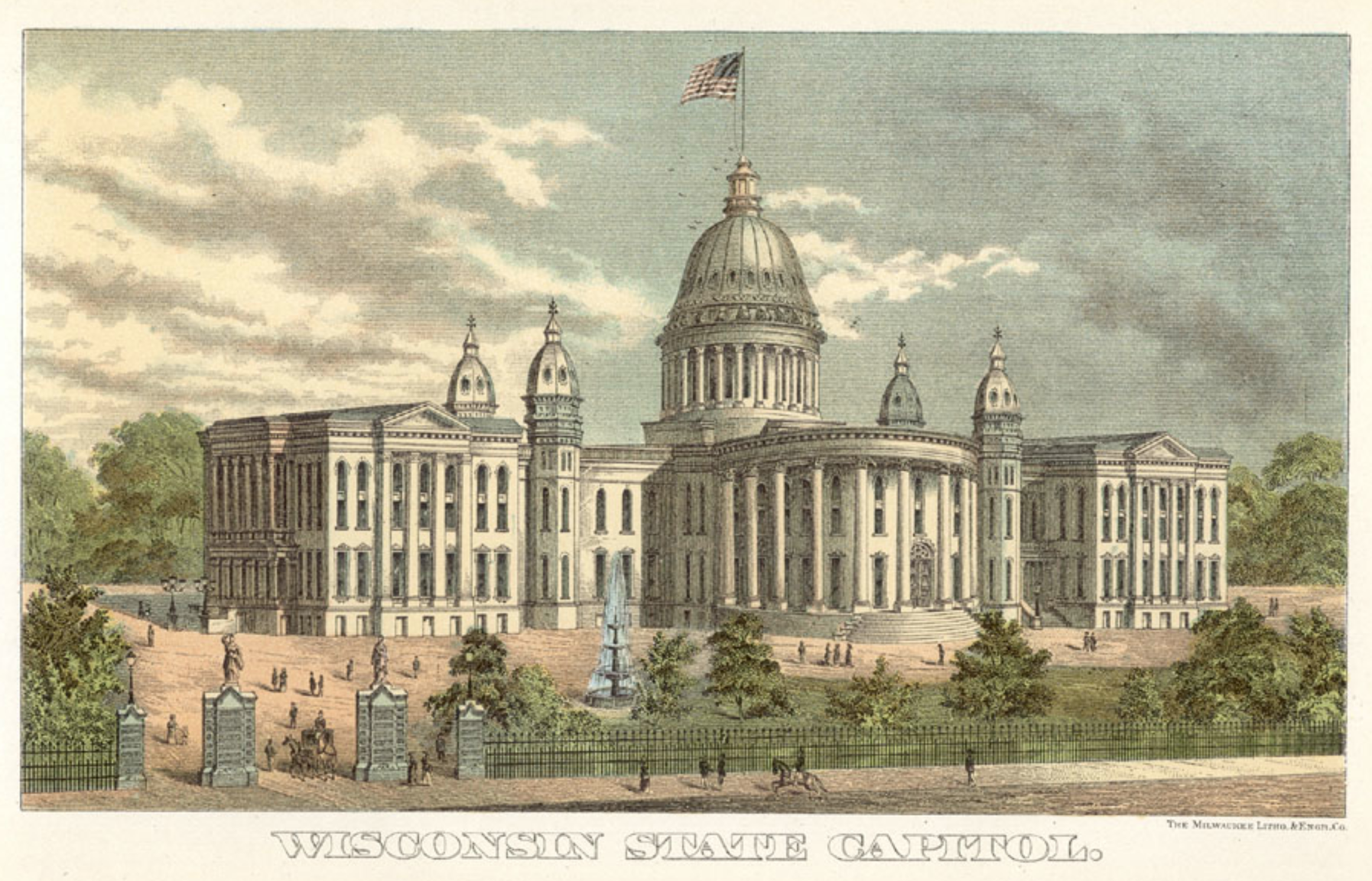
- Wisconsin State Capitol, 1887

Overview
- Legislative body: Wisconsin Legislature
- Meeting place: Wisconsin State Capitol
- Term: January 5, 1891 – January 2, 1893
- Election: November 4, 1890

Senate
- Members: 33
- Senate President: Charles Jonas (D)
- President pro tempore: Frederick W. Horn (D)
- Party control: Democratic

Assembly
- Members: 100
- Assembly Speaker: James J. Hogan (D)
- Party control: Democratic

Sessions
- 1st: January 14, 1891 – April 25, 1891

Special sessions
- 1892 Spec. 1: June 28, 1892 – July 1, 1892
- 1892 Spec. 2: October 17, 1892 – October 27, 1892

The Fortieth Wisconsin Legislature convened from January 14, 1891, to April 25, 1891, in regular session. They met again for two special sessions in June 1892 and October 1892 to pass redistricting laws. The extra sessions were necessitated by court cases which threw out the Legislature's previous attempts at redistricting. The final redistricting act was signed just 12 days before the 1892 general election.

This was the first session where the Democratic Party had full control of the Legislature since 1854.

Senators representing odd-numbered districts were newly elected for this session and were serving the first two years of a four-year term. Assembly members were elected to a two-year term. Assembly members and odd-numbered senators were elected in the general election of November 4, 1890. Senators representing even-numbered districts were serving the third and fourth year of a four-year term, having been elected in the general election of November 6, 1888.

The governor of Wisconsin during this entire term was Democrat George Wilbur Peck, of Milwaukee County, serving a two-year term, having won election in the 1890 Wisconsin gubernatorial election.

== Major events ==
- January 5, 1891: Inauguration of George Wilbur Peck as the 17th Governor of Wisconsin.
- January 28, 1891: William Freeman Vilas elected United States Senator by the Wisconsin Legislature in joint session.
- April 3, 1891: Wisconsin Supreme Court justice David Taylor died in office.
- April 7, 1891: Silas U. Pinney was elected to the Wisconsin Supreme Court, to the seat being vacated by the retirement of Orsamus Cole.
- May 4, 1891: John B. Winslow was appointed to the Wisconsin Supreme Court by Governor George Wilbur Peck, to replace David Taylor.
- August 17, 1891: The French Republic and Russian Empire formed a defensive alliance.
- January 4, 1892: As the senior-most member of the court, William P. Lyon became the 7th chief justice of the Wisconsin Supreme Court due to the retirement of Orsamus Cole. He was the first chief justice to obtain the office under the new amendment to the Wisconsin Constitution ratified in 1889.
- March 22, 1892: The Wisconsin Supreme Court struck down the redistricting law passed by the Legislature, in the case State ex rel. Attorney General v. Cunningam.
- September 27, 1892: The Wisconsin Supreme Court struck down the second redistricting law passed by the Legislature, in the case State ex rel. Lamb v. Cunningham.
- November 8, 1892: 1892 United States general election:
  - Grover Cleveland elected President of the United States for a second non-consecutive term.
  - George Wilbur Peck re-elected as Governor of Wisconsin.

== Major legislation ==
=== Regular session ===
- February 5, 1891: An Act to repeal chapter 519, of the laws of the state of Wisconsin for the year 1889, entitled, "An act concerning the education and employment of children." 1891 Act 4. Repealed the entire "Bennett Law" due to its provision requiring English language education.
- April 25, 1891: An Act to apportion the state into senate and assembly districts, 1891 Act 482. First attempt to pass a legislative redistricting. This law was struck down by the Wisconsin Supreme Court in March 1892.
- April 25, 1891: An Act to apportion the state into congressional districts, 1891 Act 483.
- Joint resolution agreeing to a proposed amendment to sub-division 9, of section 31, of article IV of the constitution of the state of Wisconsin, 1891 Joint Resolution 4. This was the required second legislative passage of a proposed amendment to prohibit the Legislature from making private laws affecting specific city charters. The amendment was ratified by referendum at the November 1892 general election.

=== First special session ===
- July 1, 1892: An Act to apportion the state of Wisconsin into senate and assembly districts, 1892 Special Session 1 Act 1. This was the second attempt to pass a legislative redistricting. This map was also struck down by the Wisconsin Supreme Court, in September 1892.

=== Second special session ===
- October 27, 1892: An Act to apportion the state of Wisconsin into senate and assembly districts, 1892 Special Session 2 Act 1. This was the third and final attempt to pass a legislative redistricting based on the 1890 U.S. census. This map was utilized for the 1892 election, held just 12 days after the law was signed.
- October 27, 1892: An Act relating to the general election to be held on the eighth day of November, in the year 1892, and to notices thereof and nominations therefor, and for other purposes, 1892 Special Session 2 Act 2. Due to the lateness of the legislative redistricting, it was necessary to clarify the status of existing nominees for the legislature and create special procedures for candidates to get on the ballot for the November 1892 general election.

== Party summary ==
=== Senate summary ===
Senate partisan composition Democratic: 19 seats Republican: 14 seats

	Party (Shading indicates majority caucus)				Total	
	Dem.	Lab.	Ind.	Rep.	Total	Vacant
End of previous Legislature	6	2	1	24	33	0
Start of 1st Session	18	0	0	15	33	0
From Feb. 4, 1891 (Note: Democrat John Fetzer won an election challenge to unseat Edward Scofield (District 1).)	19	0	0	14	33	0
From Nov. 15, 1891 (Note: Democrat Walter S. Greene (District 23) died.)	18	0	0	14	32	1
From May 30, 1892 (Note: Democrat Albert Solliday (District 23) replaced Walter S. Greene.)	19	0	0	14	33	0
Final voting share	57.58%			42.42%		
Beginning of the next Legislature	26	0	0	7	33	0

=== Assembly summary ===
Assembly partisan composition Democratic: 66 seats Labor: 1 seat Republican: 33 seats

	Party (Shading indicates majority caucus)			Total	
	Dem.	Lab.	Rep.	Total	Vacant
End of previous Legislature	29	0	71	100	0
1st Session	66	1	33	100	0
From Mar. 11, 1891 (Note: Democrat John Edwards (Wood County) died.)	65	1	33	99	1
From Dec. 8, 1891 (Note: Republican Phillip Rossman (Clark County) died.)	65	1	32	98	2
Final voting share	67.35%		32.65%		
Beginning of the next Legislature	55	0	45	100	0

== Sessions ==
- 1st Regular session: January 14, 1891 – April 25, 1891
- 1892 special session 1: June 28, 1892 – July 1, 1892
- 1892 special session 2: October 17, 1892 – October 27, 1892

== Leaders ==
=== Senate leadership ===
- President of the Senate: Charles Jonas (D)
- President pro tempore: Frederick W. Horn (D)

=== Assembly leadership ===
- Speaker of the Assembly: James J. Hogan (D)

== Members ==
=== Members of the Senate ===
Members of the Senate for the Fortieth Wisconsin Legislature:

Senate partisan representation Democratic: 19 seats Republican: 14 seats

Dist.	Counties	Senator	Residence	Party
01	Door, Marinette, & Oconto	Edward Scofield (until Feb. 4, 1891)	Oconto	Rep.
01	Door, Marinette, & Oconto	John Fetzer (from Feb. 4, 1891)	Forestville	Dem.
02	Brown & Calumet	Enos W. Persons	De Pere	Dem.
03	Racine	Adam Apple	Norway	Dem.
04	Milwaukee (City North)	John J. Kempf	Milwaukee	Rep.
05	Milwaukee (City Center)	Paul Bechtner	Milwaukee	Rep.
06	Milwaukee (City South)	Herman Kroeger	Milwaukee	Dem.
07	Milwaukee (County)	Christian A. Koenitzer	Milwaukee	Dem.
08	Kenosha & Walworth	James C. Reynolds	Lake Geneva	Rep.
09	Green Lake, Portage, Waushara, & western Marathon	Ferdinand T. Yahr	Princeton	Dem.
10	Pierce & St. Croix	William H. Phipps	Hudson	Rep.
11	Ashland, Florence, Forest, Langlade, Lincoln, Price, & Taylor	John T. Kingston	Ashland	Dem.
12	Green & Lafayette	Phineas Clawson	Monroe	Rep.
13	Dodge	William Voss	Watertown	Dem.
14	Juneau & Sauk	Frank Avery	Baraboo	Rep.
15	Kewaunee & Manitowoc	William F. Nash	Two Rivers	Dem.
16	Crawford & Grant	Edward I. Kidd	Prairie du Chien	Rep.
17	Rock	Richard Burdge	Beloit	Rep.
18	Fond du Lac (Western Part)	Samuel B. Stanchfield	Fond du Lac	Rep.
19	Winnebago (Except Manasha)	George W. Pratt	Oshkosh	Dem.
20	Sheboygan & Eastern Fond du Lac	Major C. Mead	Plymouth	Dem.
21	Shawano, Waupaca, & eastern Marathon	Joseph H. Woodnorth	Waupaca	Dem.
22	Calumet & Outagamie	William Kennedy	Appleton	Dem.
23	Jefferson & western Waukesha	Walter S. Greene (Died Nov. 15, 1891)	Fort Atkinson	Dem.
23	Jefferson & western Waukesha	Albert Solliday (From May 30, 1892)	Watertown	Dem.
24	Barron, Bayfield, Burnett, Douglas, Polk, Sawyer, & Washburn	Charles S. Taylor	Barron	Rep.
25	Clark & Eau Claire	Robert MacBride	Neillsville	Dem.
26	Dane	Willett Main	Madison	Rep.
27	Adams, Columbia & Marquette	Russell C. Falconer	Portage	Dem.
28	Iowa & Richland	Robert Joiner	Wyoming	Rep.
29	Buffalo, Trempealeau, & Pepin	Robert Lees	Alma	Dem.
30	Chippewa & Dunn	William Millar	Red Cedar	Rep.
31	La Crosse & Vernon	Henry Conner	Viroqua	Dem.
32	Jackson, Monroe, & Wood	Hugh H. Price	Black River Falls	Rep.
33	Ozaukee, Washington, & eastern Waukesha	Frederick W. Horn	Cedarburg	Dem.

=== Members of the Assembly ===
Members of the Assembly for the Fortieth Wisconsin Legislature:

Assembly partisan composition Democratic: 66 seats Labor: 1 seat Republican: 33 seats

Milwaukee County districts

Senate District	County	Dist.	Representative	Party	Residence
27	Adams & Marquette		Clarence V. Peirce	Rep.	Shields
11	Ashland, Florence, Forest, Oneida, & Price		Louis Rossmann	Rep.	Phillips
24	Barron		Charles W. Moore	Rep.	Chetek
24	Bayfield, Burnett, Douglas, Sawyer, & Washburn		Lewis H. Mead	Rep.	Shell Lake
02	Brown	1	Albert L. Gray	Dem.	Fort Howard
02	Brown	2	Robert J. McGeehan	Dem.	De Pere
29	Buffalo		John Leonhardy	Dem.	Alma
02	Calumet		William V. McMullen	Dem.	Brillion
30	Chippewa		James A. Taylor	Dem.	Chippewa Falls
25	Clark		Phillip Rossman (Died Dec. 8, 1891)	Rep.	Greenwood
25	Clark		--Vacant--		
27	Columbia	1	Clinton E. Smith	Dem.	Randolph
27	Columbia	2	Lewis H. Smith	Rep.	Arlington
16	Crawford		Ambrose Thompson	Dem.	Seneca
26	Dane	1	Harry E. Briggs	Dem.	Madison
26	Dane	2	Christian Reuter	Dem.	Roxbury
26	Dane	3	Joseph R. Henderson	Dem.	Springdale
26	Dane	4	William H. Porter	Rep.	Medina
13	Dodge	1	Michael E. Burke	Dem.	Beaver Dam
13	Dodge	2	Bennett E. Sampson	Dem.	Oakfield
13	Dodge	3	William S. Schwefel	Dem.	Lebanon
01	Door		Charles M. Whiteside	Dem.	Sawyer
30	Dunn		Albert R. Hall	Rep.	Knapp
25	Eau Claire	1	William T. Pugh	Rep.	Eau Claire
25	Eau Claire	2	Oscar Finch	Dem.	Augusta
18	Fond du Lac	1	Frank Bowe	Dem.	Rosendale
18	Fond du Lac	2	James W. Watson	Dem.	Fond du Lac
20	Fond du Lac	3	James Bannon	Dem.	New Cassel
16	Grant	1	John Longbotham	Rep.	Paris
16	Grant	2	John J. Oswald	Dem.	Lancaster
16	Grant	3	Christopher Hinn	Dem.	Fennimore
12	Green & Lafayette	1	Henry Putnam	Rep.	Brodhead
12	Green & Lafayette	2	Charles F. Osborn	Rep.	Darlington
12	Green & Lafayette	3	Charles J. Meloy	Dem.	Shullsburg
09	Green Lake		E. C. Smith	Dem.	Markesan
28	Iowa	1	Robert M. Crawford	Dem.	Mineral Point
28	Iowa	2	Edmund Baker	Dem.	Linden
32	Jackson		James J. McGillivray	Rep.	Black River Falls
23	Jefferson	1	C. Hugo Jacobi	Dem.	Watertown
23	Jefferson	2	Joseph Stoppenbach	Dem.	Jefferson
14	Juneau		Joseph W. Babcock	Rep.	Necedah
08	Kenosha		Robert S. Houston	Dem.	Pleasant Prairie
15	Kewaunee & Manitowoc	1	Patrick J. Conway	Dem.	Meeme
15	Kewaunee & Manitowoc	2	James P. Nolan	Dem.	Maple Grove
15	Kewaunee & Manitowoc	3	William Croll	Dem.	Manitowoc
15	Kewaunee & Manitowoc	4	Joseph Filz	Dem.	Luxemburg
31	La Crosse	1	James J. Hogan	Dem.	La Crosse
31	La Crosse	2	John Dawson	Dem.	La Crosse
11	Langlade, Lincoln, & Taylor		Clinton Textor	Dem.	Medford
09	Marathon	1	Thomas O'Connor	Dem.	Emmet
21	Marathon	2	Neal Brown	Dem.	Wausau
01	Marinette		James Larsin	Lab.	Menekaunee
04	Milwaukee	1	Humphrey J. Desmond	Dem.	Milwaukee
05	Milwaukee	2	William J. Fiebrantz	Rep.	Milwaukee
06	Milwaukee	3	Edward Keogh	Dem.	Milwaukee
05	Milwaukee	4	Orren T. Williams	Rep.	Milwaukee
06	Milwaukee	5	Conrad Krez	Dem.	Milwaukee
04	Milwaukee	6	William Pierron	Rep.	Milwaukee
05	Milwaukee	7	Charles H. Anson	Rep.	Milwaukee
07	Milwaukee	8	Henry Schuetz	Dem.	Milwaukee
04	Milwaukee	9	Philip Schmitz	Dem.	Milwaukee
07	Milwaukee	10	John Horn	Dem.	Milwaukee
07	Milwaukee	11	Ambrose McGuigan	Dem.	Milwaukee
06	Milwaukee	12	Michał Kruszka	Dem.	Milwaukee
32	Monroe	1	David W. Cheney	Dem.	Sparta
32	Monroe	2	James Tormey	Dem.	Tomah
01	Oconto		Lewis S. Bailey	Dem.	Oconto
22	Outagamie	1	John Tracy	Dem.	Appleton
22	Outagamie	2	Theodore Knapstein	Dem.	New London
33	Ozaukee		William H. Fitzgerald	Dem.	Cedarburg
29	Pepin		William E. Plummer	Rep.	Durand
10	Pierce		Daniel J. Dill	Rep.	Prescott
24	Polk		Henry B. Dike	Rep.	Osceola
09	Portage		Charles Couch	Dem.	Amherst
03	Racine		Joshua E. Dodge	Dem.	Racine
28	Richland		Jay G. Lamberson	Rep.	Buena Vista
17	Rock	1	Ole P. Gaarder	Rep.	Orfordville
17	Rock	2	John Winans	Dem.	Janesville
17	Rock	3	Henry Tarrant	Rep.	La Prairie
14	Sauk	1	Thomas W. English	Dem.	Freedom
14	Sauk	2	Henry C. Hunt	Dem.	Reedsburg
21	Shawano & Waupaca	1	Alfred R. Lea	Dem.	Waupaca
21	Shawano & Waupaca	2	David Jennings	Dem.	Mukwa
21	Shawano & Waupaca	3	Otto O. Wiegand	Dem.	Shawano
20	Sheboygan	1	Dennis T. Phalen	Dem.	Sheboygan
20	Sheboygan	2	Allen F. Warden	Dem.	Plymouth
20	Sheboygan	3	Alvah R. Munger	Rep.	Scott
10	St. Croix		George W. Chinnock	Rep.	River Falls
29	Trempealeau		Michael J. Warner	Dem.	Hale
31	Vernon	1	Brown Olson	Rep.	Christiana
31	Vernon	2	Edgar Eno	Rep.	Forest
08	Walworth	1	Fernando C. Kizer	Rep.	Whitewater
08	Walworth	2	Joseph S. Maxon	Rep.	Walworth
33	Washington		August Konrad	Dem	Hartford
33	Waukesha	1	Ernest Bullard	Dem.	Waukesha
23	Waukesha	2	Omar L. Rosenkrans	Rep.	Oconomowoc
09	Waushara		Cornelius A. Davenport	Rep.	Aurora
19	Winnebago	1	Gustav S. Luscher	Dem.	Oshkosh
19	Winnebago	2	Samuel A. Cook	Rep.	Neenah
19	Winnebago	3	William F. Faber	Dem.	Oshkosh
32	Wood		John Edwards (died Mar. 11, 1891)	Dem.	Port Edwards
32	Wood		--Vacant--		

== Committees ==
=== Senate committees ===
- Senate Committee on Agriculture – Adam Apple, chair
- Senate Committee on Assessment and Collection of Taxes – Frederick W. Horn, chair
- Senate Committee on Education – Russel C. Falconer, chair
- Senate Committee on Enrolled Bills – William F. Voss, chair
- Senate Committee on Engrossed Bills – F. T. Yahr, chair
- Senate Committee on Federal Relations – Robert J. MacBride, chair
- Senate Committee on Finance, Banks, and Insurance – Enos W. Persons, chair
- Senate Committee on Incorporations – Robert J. MacBride, chair
- Senate Committee on the Judiciary – William Kennedy, chair
- Senate Committee on Legislative Expenditures – Henry Conner, chair
- Senate Committee on Manufacturing and Commerce – Herman Kroeger, chair
- Senate Committee on Military Affairs – J. H. Woodnorth, chair
- Senate Committee on Privileges and Elections – Robert Lees, chair
- Senate Committee on Public Lands – George W. Pratt, chair
- Senate Committee on Railroads – Walter S. Greene, chair
- Senate Committee on Roads and Bridges – John Fetzer, chair
- Senate Committee on State Affairs – George W. Pratt, chair
- Senate Committee on Town and County Organizations – John T. Kingston, chair

=== Assembly committees ===
- Assembly Committee on Agriculture – John Dawson, chair
- Assembly Committee on Assessment and Collection of Taxes – J. E. Dodge, chair
- Assembly Committee on Bills on their Third Reading – H. E. Briggs, chair
- Assembly Committee on Cities – Dennis T. Phalen, chair
- Assembly Committee on Education – H. J. Desmond, chair
- Assembly Committee on Engrossed Bills – C. Hugo Jacobi, chair
- Assembly Committee on Enrolled Bills – J. Tormey, chair
- Assembly Committee on Federal Relations – Clinton Textor, chair
- Assembly Committee on Incorporations – R. J. McGeehan, chair
- Assembly Committee on Insurance, Banks, and Banking – Gustave S. Luscher, chair
- Assembly Committee on the Judiciary – John Winans, chair
- Assembly Committee on Legislative Expenditures – M. E. Burke, chair
- Assembly Committee on Labor and Manufactures – A. McGuigan, chair
- Assembly Committee on Lumber and Mining – James A. Taylor, chair
- Assembly Committee on Medical Societies – E. L. Bullard, chair
- Assembly Committee on Militia – John J. Oswald, chair
- Assembly Committee on Privileges and Elections – J. P. Nolan, chair
- Assembly Committee on Public Improvements – W. H. Fitzgerald, chair
- Assembly Committee on Public Lands – Conrad Krez, chair
- Assembly Committee on Railroads – Edward Keogh, chair
- Assembly Committee on Roads and Bridges – E. C. Smith, chair
- Assembly Committee on State Affairs – J. W. Watson, chair
- Assembly Committee on Town and County Organization – Theo. Knapstein, chair
- Assembly Committee on Ways and Means – John Edwards, chair

=== Joint committees ===
- Joint Committee on Apportionment – W. S. Greene (Sen.) & John Winans (Asm.), co-chairs
- Joint Committee on Charitable and Penal Institutions – M. C. Mead (Sen.) & Neal Brown (Asm.), co-chairs
- Joint Committee on Claims – W. F. Nash (Sen.) & R. M. Crawford (Asm.), co-chairs
- Joint Committee on Printing – C. A. Koenitzer (Sen.) & W. V. McMullen (Asm.), co-chairs
- Joint Committee on Retrenchment – Robert Lees (Sen.) & J. E. Dodge (Asm.), co-chairs

== Employees ==
=== Senate employees ===
- Chief Clerk: Jon P. Hume
  - Assistant Chief Clerk: Sam J. Shafer
    - Assistant Clerk: Jackson Silbaugh
  - Bookkeeper: Edward Malone
  - Engrossing Clerk: L. S. Truesdell
    - Assistant Engrossing Clerk: M. P. Persons
  - Enrolling Clerk: Jno G. Faulds
    - Assistant Enrolling Clerk: H. F. Gustavus
  - Transcribing Clerk: C. M. Gardner
    - Assistant Transcribing Clerks:
      - Hugo Imig
      - Agnes Muller
  - Proofreader: E. R. Petherick
  - Index Clerk: Cora Cornish
  - Clerk for the Judiciary Committee: Frank T. Smith
  - Clerk for the Committee on Incorporations: Joseph Sims
  - Clerk for the Committee on Claims: David C. Gowdey
  - Clerk for the Committee on Engrossed Bills: F. J. Collignon
  - Clerk for the Committee on Enrolled Bills: B. A. Weatherby
  - Clerk for the Committee on Charitable and Penal Institutions: Amy Robinson
  - Document Clerk: Fred Herrmann
- Sergeant-at-Arms: John A. Barney
  - Assistant Sergeant-at-Arms: W. H. Putnam
- Postmaster: Peter Spehn
  - Assistant Postmaster: George McHenry
- Gallery Attendant: Tobias Jacobson
- Document Room Attendant: James P. Evans
- Committee Room Attendants:
  - Louis Birlman
  - Farrel Golden
- Comparing Clerks:
  - A. G. Pankow
  - Oscar Osthelder
- Doorkeepers:
  - H. B. Loy
  - R. Tuttle
  - Jacob Staumes
  - M. Riedy
- Porter: Peter Blair
- Night Watch: L. J. Pringel
- Janitor: Fred Brandt
- Custodian of the Enrolling Room: L. F. Terhune
- Custodian of the Engrossing Room: E. M. Keogh
- Night Laborer: John D. Fay
- Messengers:
  - Tom Kingston
  - J. E. Taylor
  - Berthold Husting
  - John Manchester
  - Ben Richmond
  - Al De Boise
  - Warren Persons
  - James Raymen
  - R. MacBride
  - Fred Klenert

=== Assembly employees ===
- Chief Clerk: G. W. Porth
  - 1st Assistant Clerk: W. L. Houser
    - 2nd Assistant Clerk: E. D. Doney
  - Bookkeeper: J. T. Huntington
  - Engrossing Clerk: William F. Collins
    - Assistant Engrossing Clerk: James Pennefeather
  - Enrolling Clerk: A. Goerz
    - Assistant Enrolling Clerk: Edward E. Fitzgibbon
  - Transcribing Clerk: C. H. Tenney
    - Assistant Transcribing Clerks:
      - George Silbernagel
      - Daniel F. O'Keefe
  - Index Clerk: Charles A. Leicht
  - Stationary Clerk: C. E. Moseley
  - Comparing Clerks:
    - A. F. Campbell
    - J. F. Cotter
  - Clerk for the Judiciary Committee: F. C. Burpee
  - Clerk for the Committee on Enrolled Bills: William Boyington
  - Clerk for the Committee on Engrossed Bills: Julius Gamm
  - Clerk for the Committee on Agriculture: C. H. Lambert
  - Clerk for the Committee on Third Reading: Edward L. Hardy
  - Clerk for the Committee on Railroads: Ed. S. Quinn
  - Clerk for the Committee on Town and County Organization: Edw. Pape
  - Document Clerk: Ulrich Wetstein
  - Custodian of the Enrolling Room: Geirge Reinsch
- Sergeant-at-Arms: P. Whalen
  - Assistant Sergeant-at-Arms: Eugene Courtney
- Postmaster: J. A. Venus
  - Assistant Postmaster: Holmes Daubner
- Doorkeepers:
  - John O'Keif
  - Frank Boyer
  - P. H. McClean
  - Ira F. Kilmer
- General Attendant: Louis Scheller
- Gallery Attendants:
  - Albert Stoppenbach
  - G. W. Brower
  - Louis Scheller
- Committee Room Attendants:
  - Charles Kache
  - William Vliet
  - J. Lonzo
- Document Room Attendant: John W. Liebenstein
- Porter: Joseph Stanton
- Flagman: S. G. Pelkey
- Night Watch: Charles Gutman
- Wash Room Attendant: J. F. Hartel
- Coat Room Attendant: William Murphy
  - Assistant Coat Room Attendant: P. C. Eliott
- Janitor: T. Kavanaugh
- Messengers:
  - Archie McCoy
  - Otto Gartner
  - Arthur Gardner
  - August Krueger
  - Everett Monohan
  - Ed Fitzgerald
  - George Haganah
  - Frank Coughlin
  - James Whitty
  - John Gray
  - Louis Oyen
  - Alven Erickson
