= Emmet, Wisconsin =

Emmet is the name of some places in the U.S. state of Wisconsin:

- Emmet, Dodge County, Wisconsin, a town
- Emmet, Marathon County, Wisconsin. a town
- Foster, Eau Claire County, Wisconsin, formerly called Emmet
