= Marion, Wisconsin (disambiguation) =

Marion may refer to some places in the U.S. state of Wisconsin:

- Marion, Wisconsin, a city located partially in Shawano and Waupaca Counties
- Marion, Grant County, Wisconsin, a town
- Marion, Juneau County, Wisconsin, a town
- Marion, Waushara County, Wisconsin, a town
