= William Faber =

William Faber may refer to:

- William F. Faber (politician) (1858–1951), American building contractor and politician in Wisconsin
- William F. Faber (bishop) (1860–1934), American clergyman

== See also ==
- Frederick William Faber (1814–1863), English hymn writer and theologian
