= Port Edwards, Wisconsin =

- Village
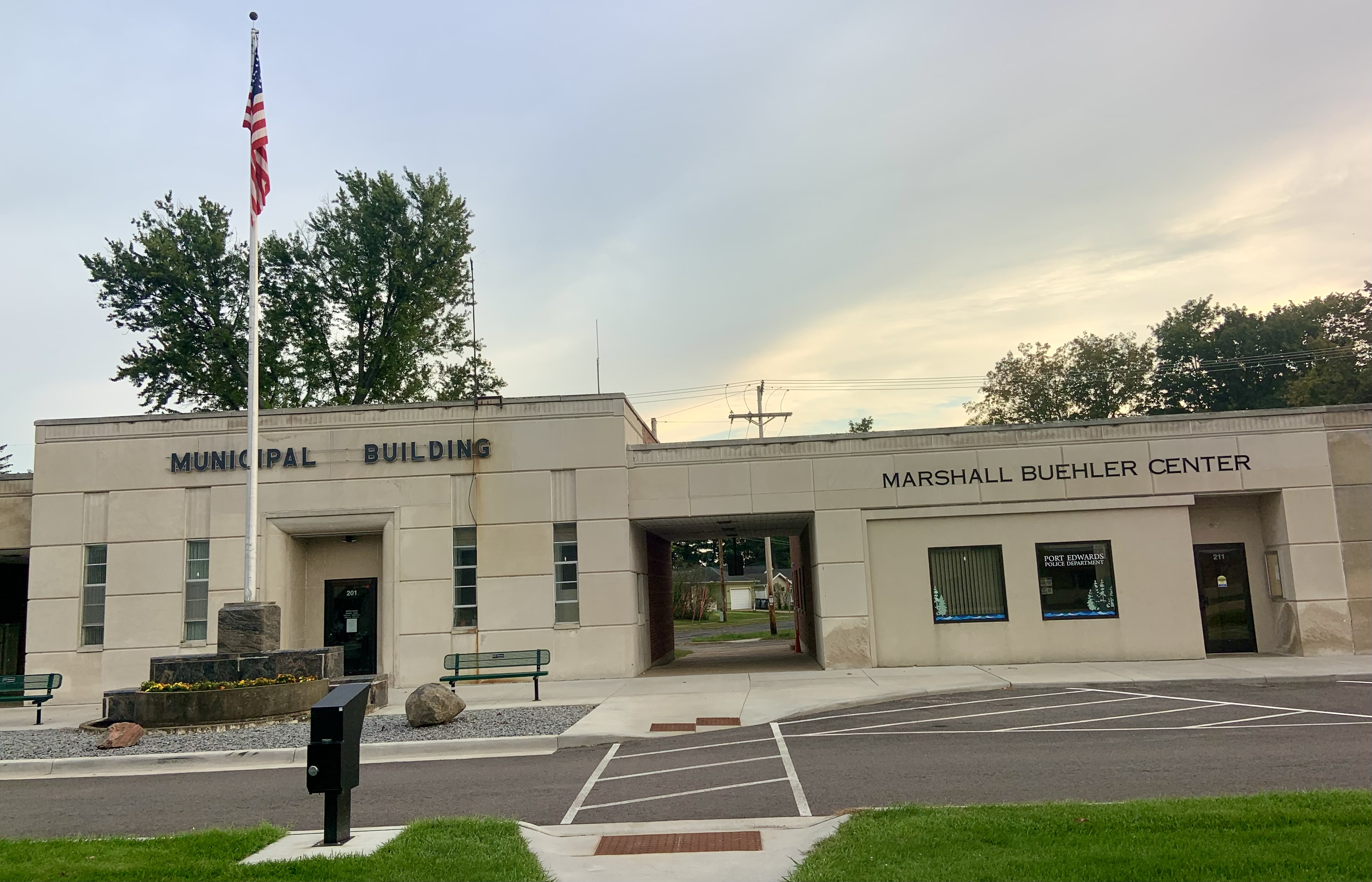
- Port Edwards municipal building

- Location of Port Edwards in Wood County, Wisconsin.
- Coordinates: 44°17′59″N 89°58′23″W
- Country: United States
- State: Wisconsin
- County: Wood

Area
  - Total: 6.48 sq mi (16.79 km^{2})
  - Land: 5.24 sq mi (13.56 km^{2})
  - Water: 1.25 sq mi (3.23 km^{2})
- Elevation: 974 ft (297 m)

Population (2020)
  - Total: 1,762
  - Density: 336.5/sq mi (129.9/km^{2})
- Time zone: UTC-6 (Central (CST))
  - Summer (DST): UTC-5 (CDT)
- Zip code(s): 54469
- Area codes: 715 & 534
- FIPS code: 55-64200
- GNIS feature ID: 1571796
- Website: www.vi.portedwards.wi.gov

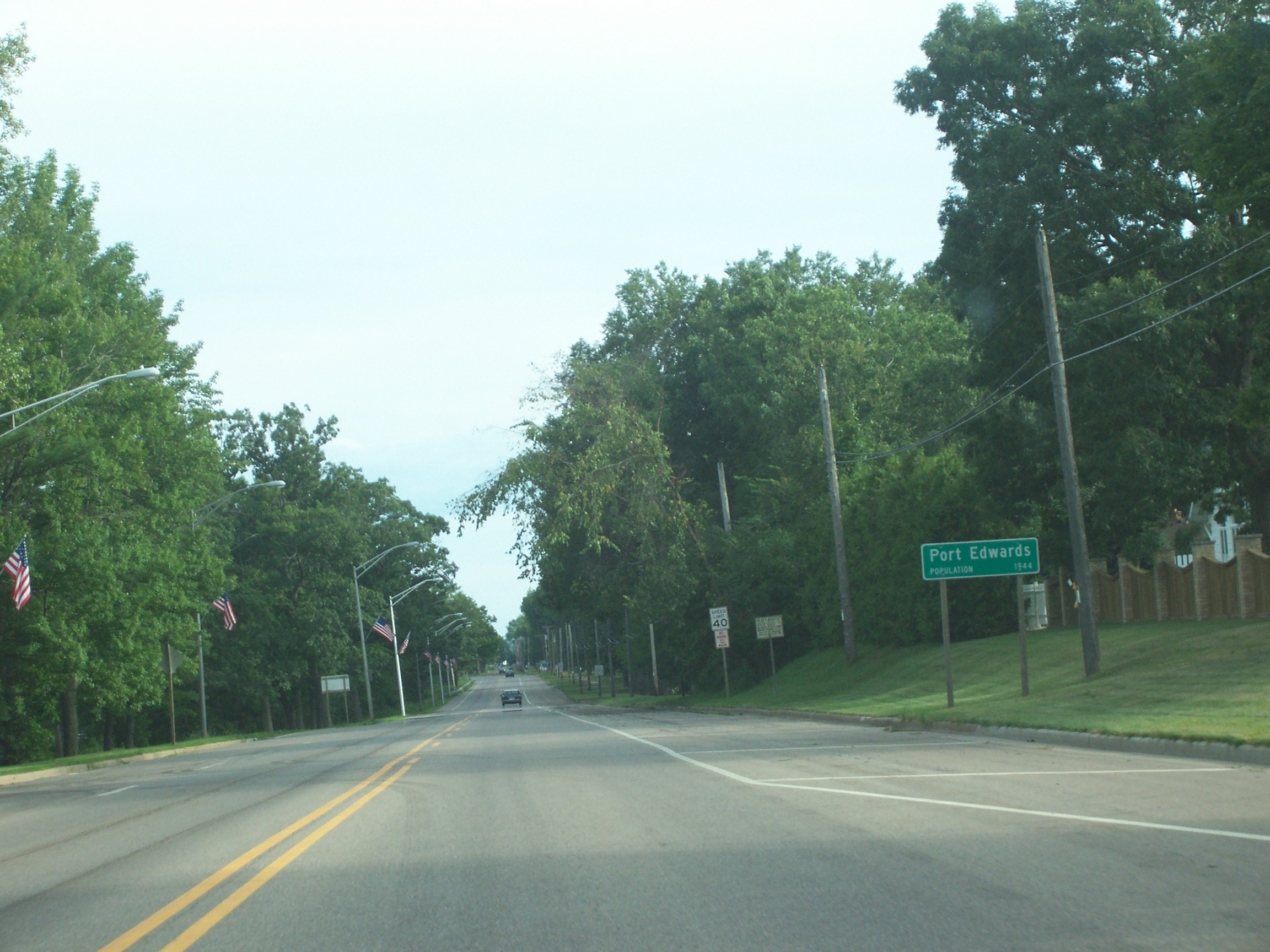
Population sign on WIS 54 / WIS 73

Port Edwards is a village in Wood County, Wisconsin, United States. The village is located northeast of and adjacent to the Town of Port Edwards. The population was 1,762 at the 2020 census.

== History ==
Port Edwards was known as "Frenchtown" until 1869, when it was renamed in honor of John Edwards, a local mill owner.

The settlement formed around a sawmill built about 1829. It was first owned by Messrs. Grignon and Merrill, who partnered in the mill for some time. It then passed on to Merrill and Whitney in 1836. In 1840 the mill was bought by John Edwards Sr. and his partner, Henry Clinton. It was then that the sawmill business, known as the Edwards and Clinton Company, began to prosper. The partnership didn't last. Because of Clinton's financial troubles, he had to transfer portions of his equity to Edwards throughout the years. By 1862 Edwards owned 100 percent of the business and changed the name to John Edwards and Company. A few years later, active management was given over to his son, John Jr. The senior Edwards died In 1871.

Mrs. Edwards wrote of the community in the 1860s, "the settlement was small only consisting of a store, a blacksmith shop, a school, two boarding houses and a number of white houses." With his success in the sawmill business, Edwards decided to run for the Wisconsin legislature as a Representative in 1890. After his election, he moved to Madison in 1891, leaving his business to be managed by his son-in-law, Lewis M. Alexander.

By the end of the 19th century most sawmills in central Wisconsin had gone out of business. Alexander decided to take a risk and convert the sawmill company into a paper mill company, completing the conversion in 1896. Although the change proved economically challenging, the company eventually succeeded, although it experienced ups and downs reflecting the overall economy.

Port Edwards incorporated as a village in 1902.

With the town heavily dependent on the mill, it slowly grew to become the community it is today. Today the village consists of a small cluster of 1890s to 1940s homes that have been preserved and refurbished. The mill shut down in 2008. The village named the high school in honor of John Edwards. The house belonging to Lewis M. Alexander's son, John, still stands.

== Geography ==
According to the United States Census Bureau, the village has a total area of 7.28 square miles (18.86 km^{2}), of which 6.03 square miles (15.62 km^{2}) is land and 1.25 square miles (3.24 km^{2}) is water.

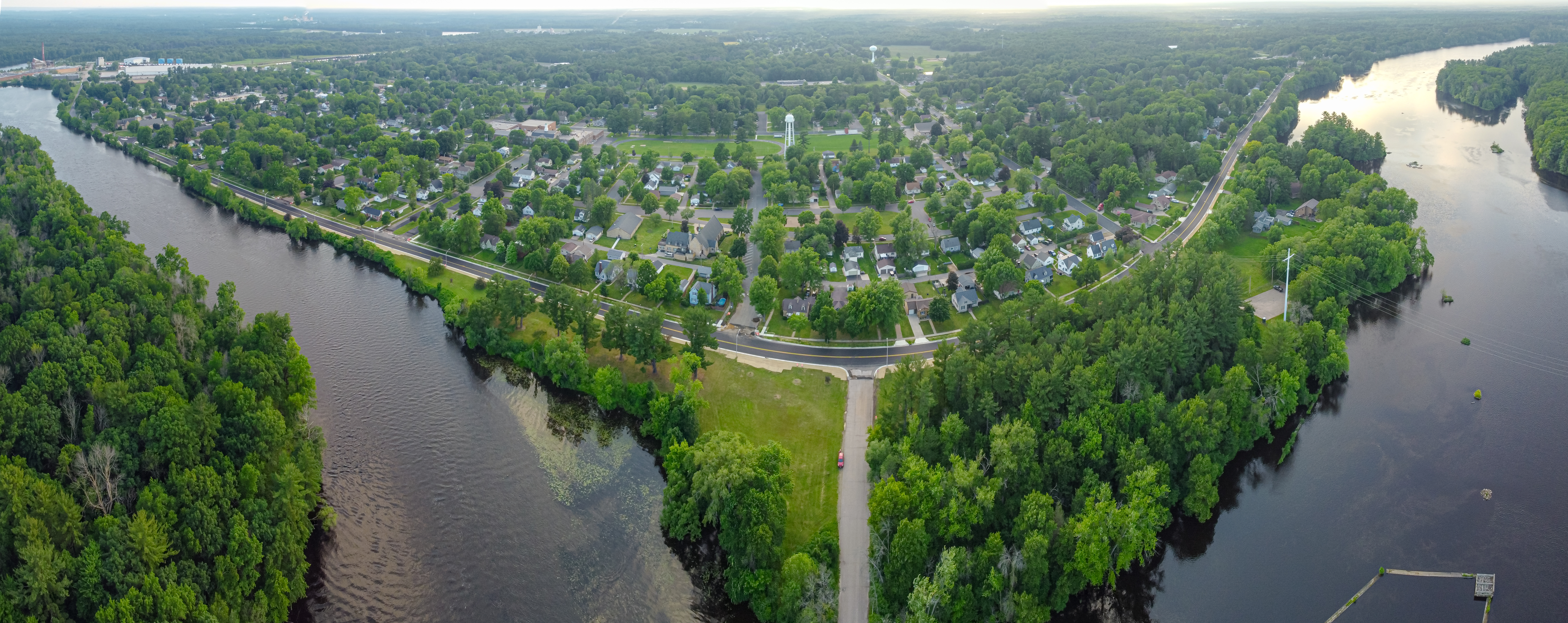

== Demographics ==
Historical population
Census	Pop.	Note	%±
1880	136		—
1910	758		—
1920	755		−0.4%
1930	988		30.9%
1940	1,192		20.6%
1950	1,336		12.1%
1960	1,849		38.4%
1970	2,126		15.0%
1980	2,077		−2.3%
1990	1,848		−11.0%
2000	1,944		5.2%
2010	1,818		−6.5%
2020	1,762		−3.1%
U.S. Decennial Census

=== 2010 census ===
As of the census of 2010, there were 1,818 people, 711 households, and 499 families residing in the village. The population density was 301.5 inhabitants per square mile (116.4/km^{2}). There were 750 housing units at an average density of 124.4 per square mile (48.0/km^{2}). The racial makeup of the village was 94.9% White, 0.9% African American, 1.3% Native American, 1.1% Asian, 0.1% Pacific Islander, 0.7% from other races, and 1.1% from two or more races. Hispanic or Latino of any race were 2.3% of the population.

There were 711 households, of which 32.1% had children under the age of 18 living with them, 56.4% were married couples living together, 9.7% had a female householder with no husband present, 4.1% had a male householder with no wife present, and 29.8% were non-families. 24.9% of all households were made up of individuals, and 13.2% had someone living alone who was 65 years of age or older. The average household size was 2.45 and the average family size was 2.90.

The median age in the village was 43.5 years. 23.6% of residents were under the age of 18; 7.2% were between the ages of 18 and 24; 21.6% were from 25 to 44; 25.6% were from 45 to 64; and 22% were 65 years of age or older. The gender makeup of the village was 47.6% male and 52.4% female.

=== 2000 census ===
As of the census of 2000, there were 1,944 people, 706 households, and 518 families residing in the village. The population density was 322.1 people per square mile (124.3/km^{2}). There were 737 housing units at an average density of 122.1 per square mile (47.1/km^{2}). The racial makeup of the village was 93.31% White, 0.57% Black or African American, 1.08% Native American, 3.86% Asian, 0.15% from other races, and 1.03% from two or more races. 0.93% of the population were Hispanic or Latino of any race.

There were 706 households, out of which 34.0% had children under the age of 18 living with them, 60.8% were married couples living together, 8.9% had a female householder with no husband present, and 26.5% were non-families. 23.9% of all households were made up of individuals, and 12.2% had someone living alone who was 65 years of age or older. The average household size was 2.58 and the average family size was 3.04.

In the village, the population was spread out, with 26.7% under the age of 18, 6.1% from 18 to 24, 24.2% from 25 to 44, 21.1% from 45 to 64, and 21.9% who were 65 years of age or older. The median age was 40 years. For every 100 females, there were 95.2 males. For every 100 females age 18 and over, there were 87.5 males.

The median income for a household in the village was $48,850, and the median income for a family was $54,801. Males had a median income of $46,250 versus $26,106 for females. The per capita income for the village was $20,750. About 5.5% of families and 7.9% of the population were below the poverty line, including 10.3% of those under age 18 and 5.1% of those age 65 or over.

== Economy ==
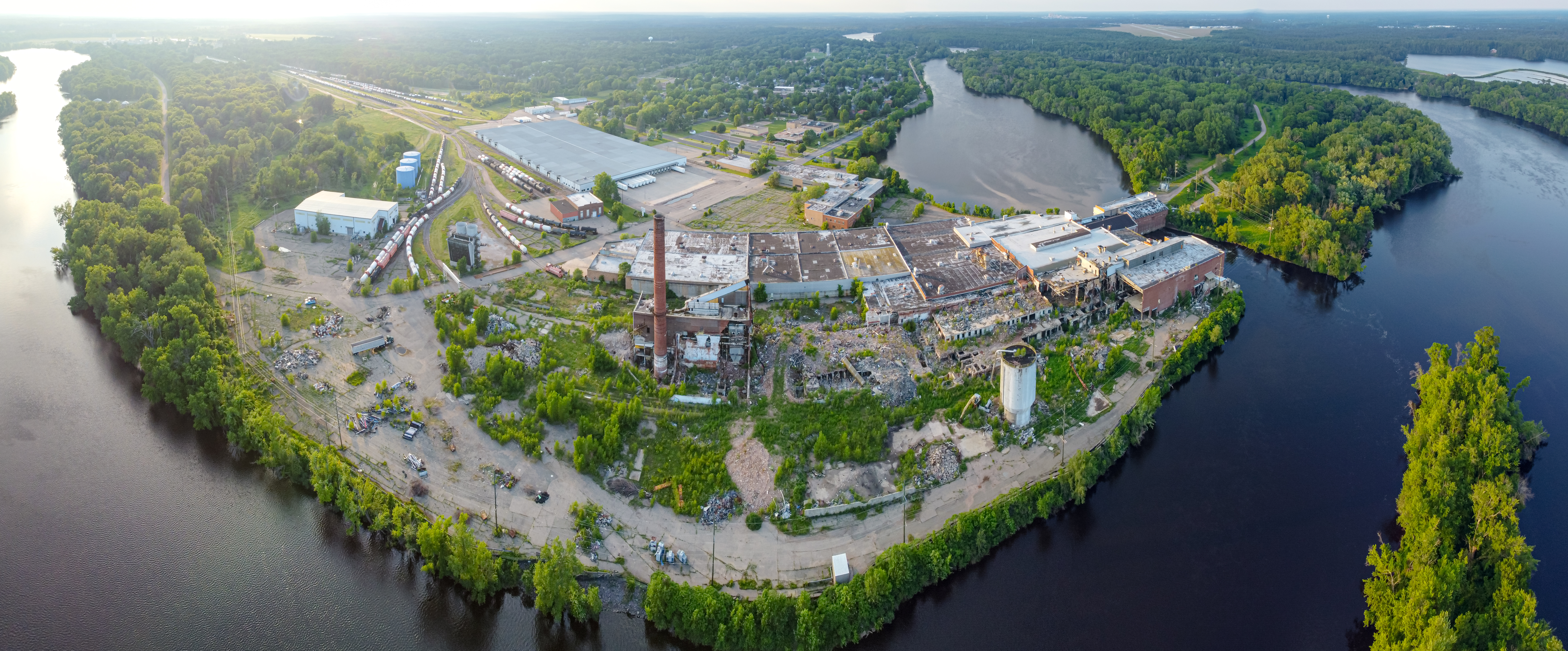
Closed paper mill on the south end of town

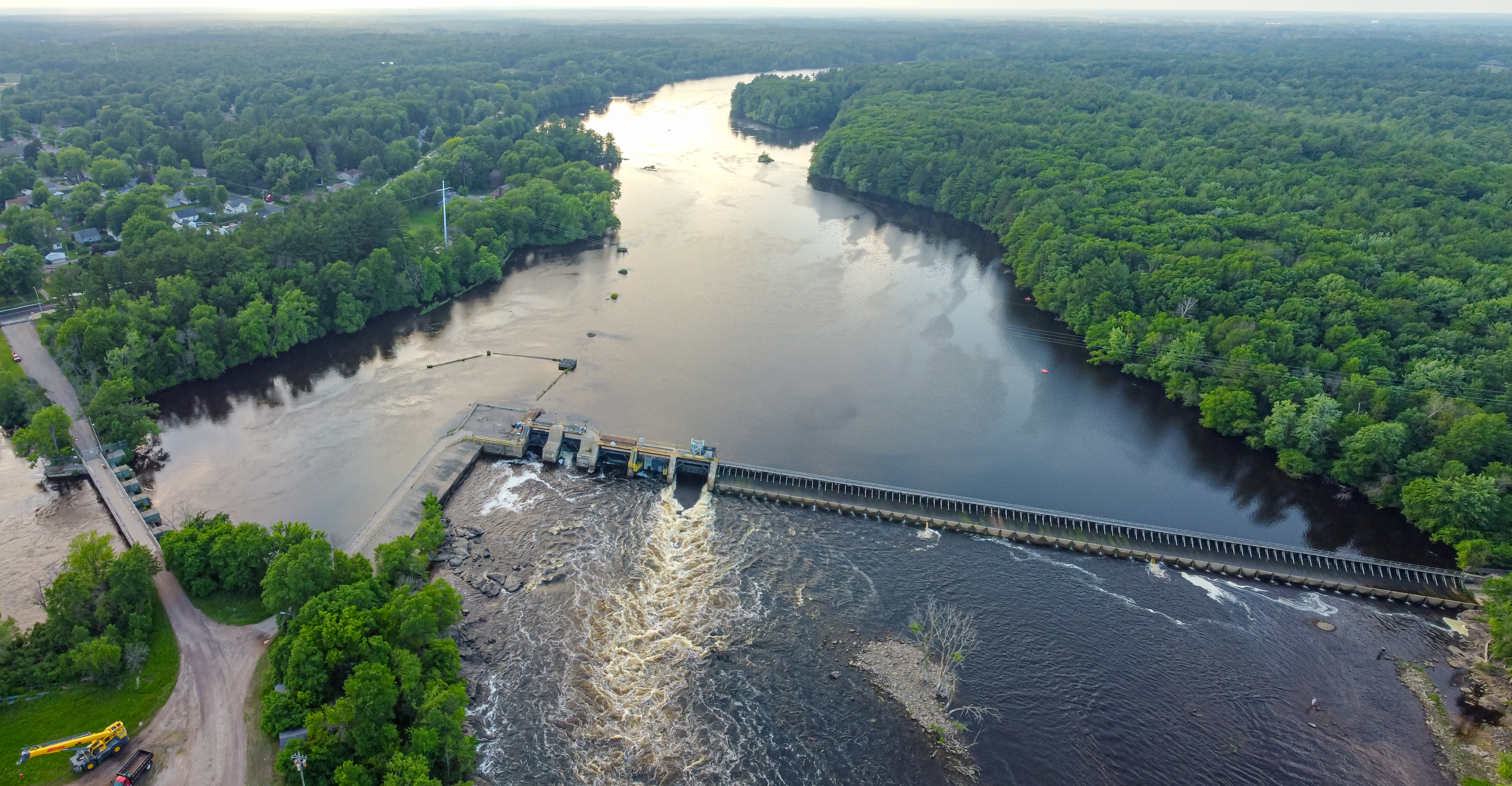
Port Edwards dam on the Wisconsin River

Employment in Port Edwards has long been dominated by paper making. The primary employer, Domtar Inc., closed its mill in mid-2008.
