= Christiana, Wisconsin =

Christiana is the name of two places in the U.S. state of Wisconsin:

- Christiana, Dane County, Wisconsin
- Christiana, Vernon County, Wisconsin
