= Ceex Haci, Wisconsin =

Census-designated place in Wisconsin, United States

- Census-designated place
- Location within Wisconsin Location within the United States
- Coordinates: 44°16′48″N 89°57′50″W
- Country: United States
- State: Wisconsin
- County: Wood
- Town: Port Edwards

Area
  - Total: 0.13 sq mi (0.33 km^{2})
  - Land: 0.13 sq mi (0.33 km^{2})
  - Water: 0 sq mi (0.0 km^{2})
- Elevation: 976 ft (297 m)

Population (2020)
  - Total: 89
- Time zone: UTC-6 (Central (CST))
  - Summer (DST): UTC-5 (CDT)
- ZIP Code: 54457 (Nekoosa)
- Area codes: 715/534
- FIPS code: 55-13587
- GNIS feature ID: 2807538

Ceex Haci is a census-designated place (CDP) in Wood County, Wisconsin, United States. As of the 2020 census, it had a population of 89.

The community is in southern Wood County, on land of the Ho-Chunk Nation of Wisconsin. It is 5 miles (8 km) southwest of Nekoosa and 10 miles (16 km) by road east-southeast of Babcock.
