= Thomas O'Connor (Wisconsin politician) =

American politician

Thomas O'Connor (December 21, 1815 – October 21, 1901) was an American farmer and politician.

Born in King's County, Ireland, O'Connor emigrated to the United States settling in Pennsylvania and then in Michigan. He worked in a rolling mill. In 1856, he settled in Halder, Wisconsin and was a farmer. O'Connor served on the Emmett Town Board and on the local school board. In 1891, he served in the Wisconsin State Assembly and was a Democrat. He died in Madison, Wisconsin.
