= Rogersville, Wisconsin =

- Unincorporated community
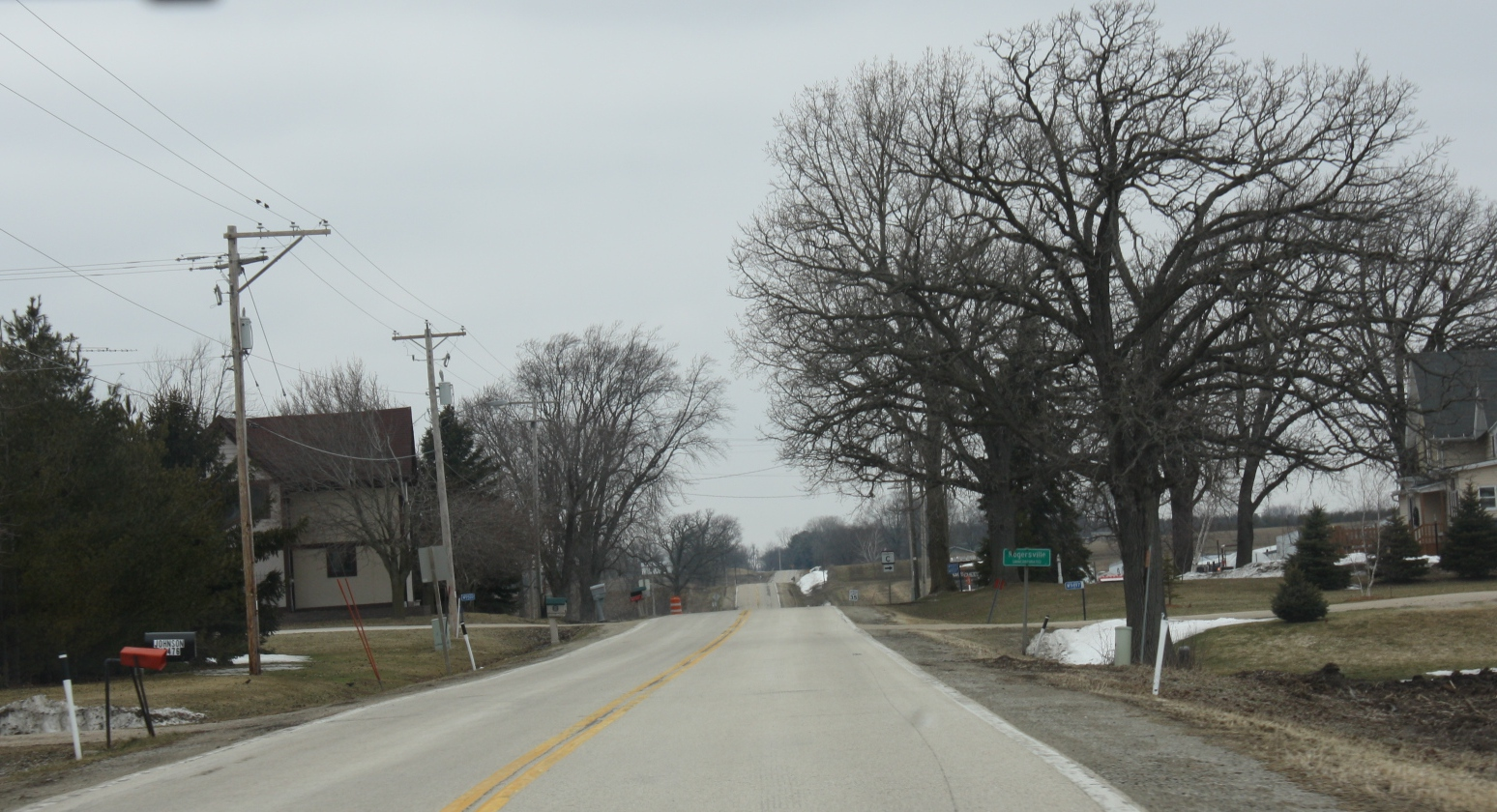
- Looking west at Rogersville

- Location within Wisconsin Location within the United States
- Coordinates: 43°44′57″N 88°37′56″W
- Country: United States
- State: Wisconsin
- County: Fond du Lac
- Elevation: 909 ft (277 m)
- Time zone: UTC-6 (Central (CST))
  - Summer (DST): UTC-5 (CDT)
- Zip Codes: 54974
- Area code: 920
- GNIS feature ID: 1572540

Rogersville is an unincorporated community located in the town of Lamartine, Fond du Lac County, Wisconsin, United States.

== Images ==
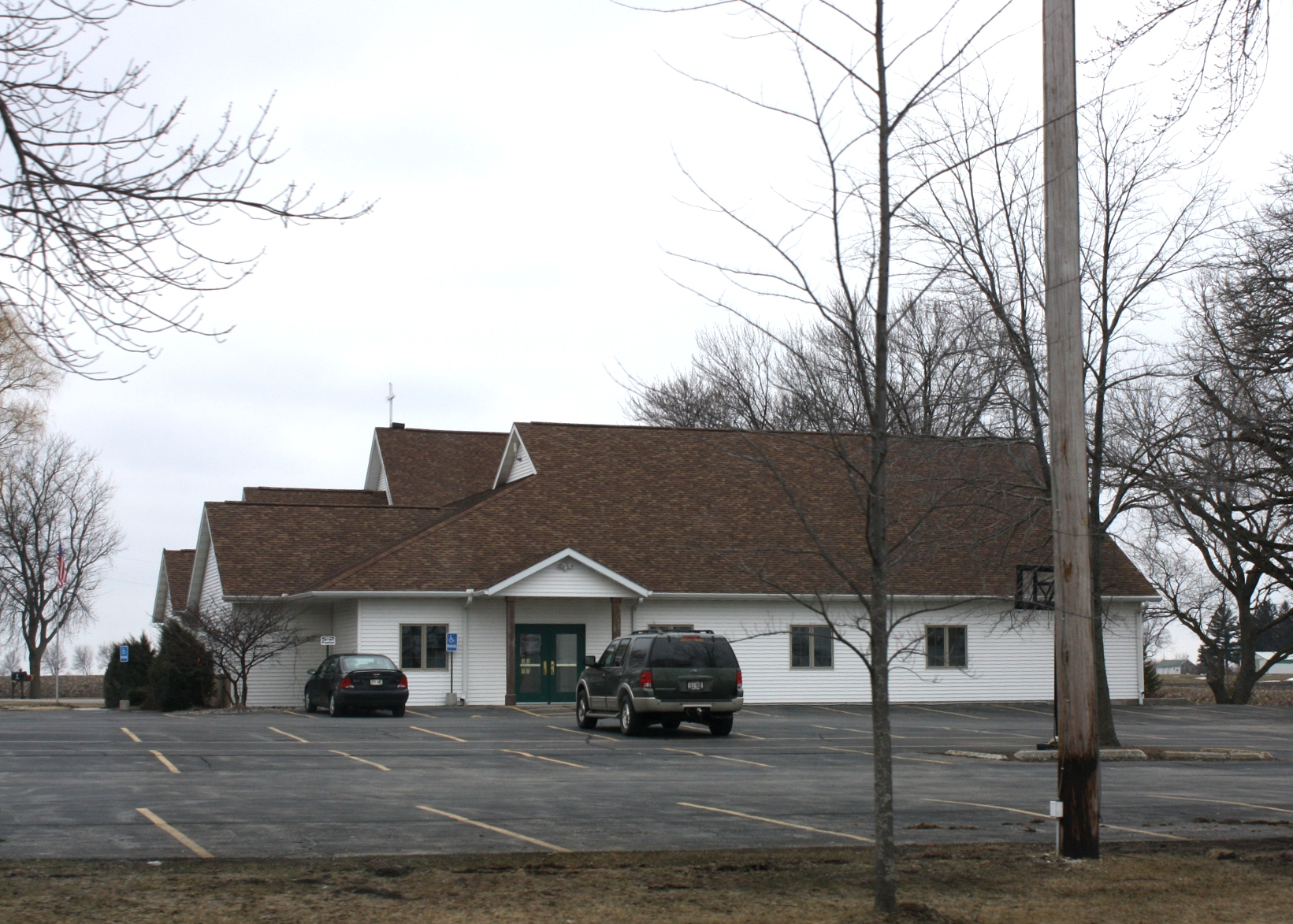
St. Stephen Lutheran Church

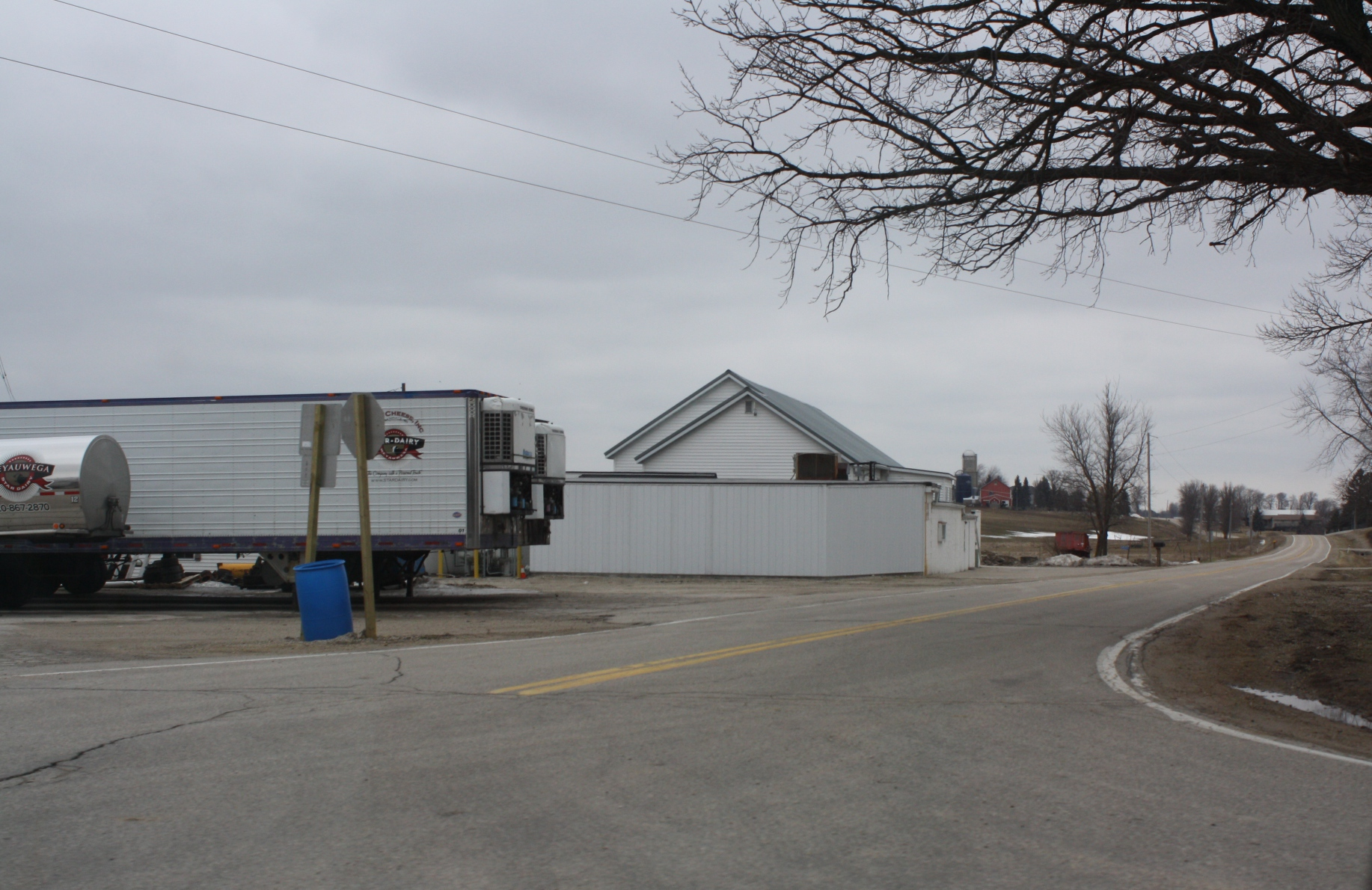
Looking north in the center of Rogersville

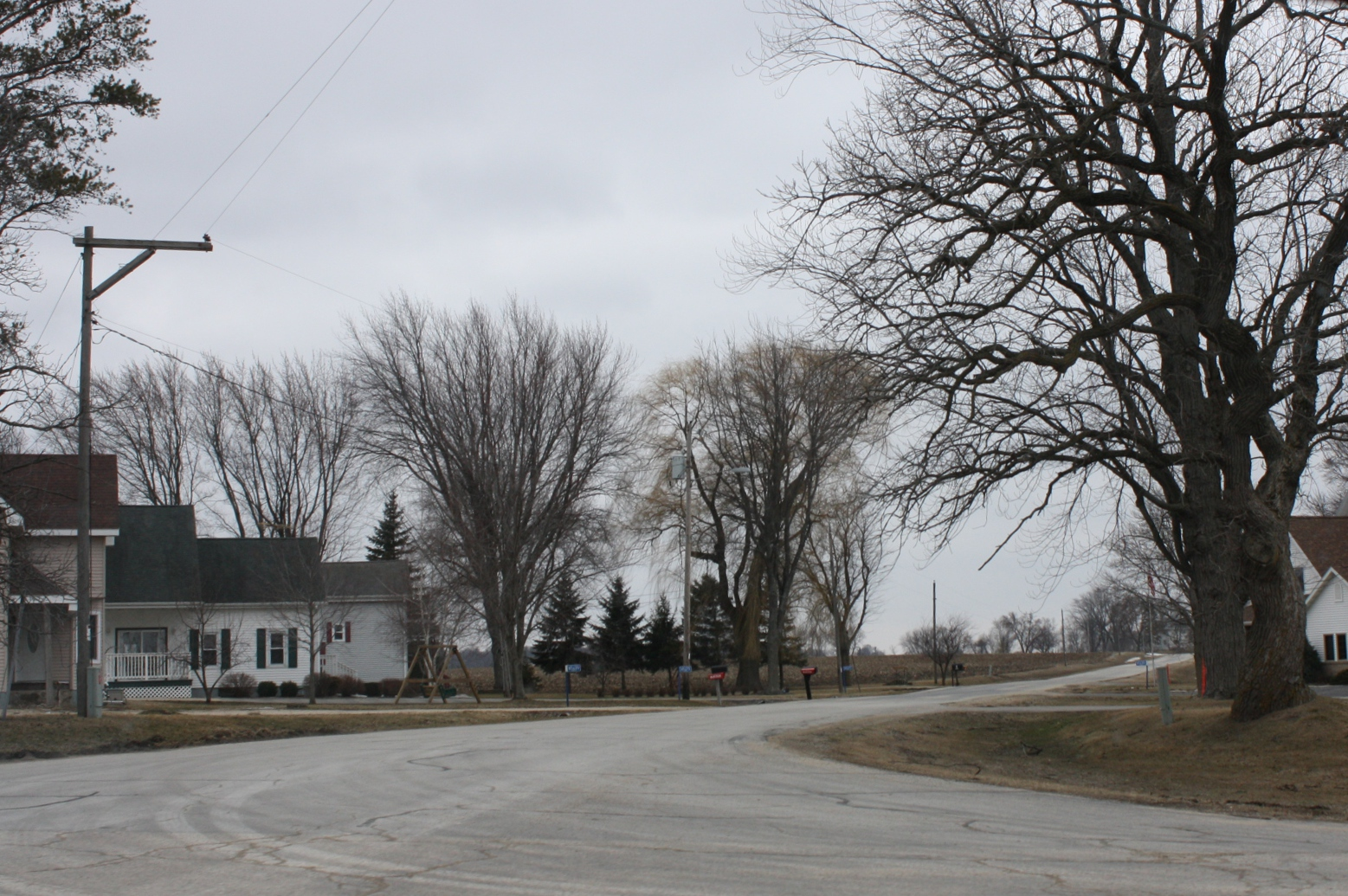
Looking south
