= New Prospect, Wisconsin =

- Unincorporated community
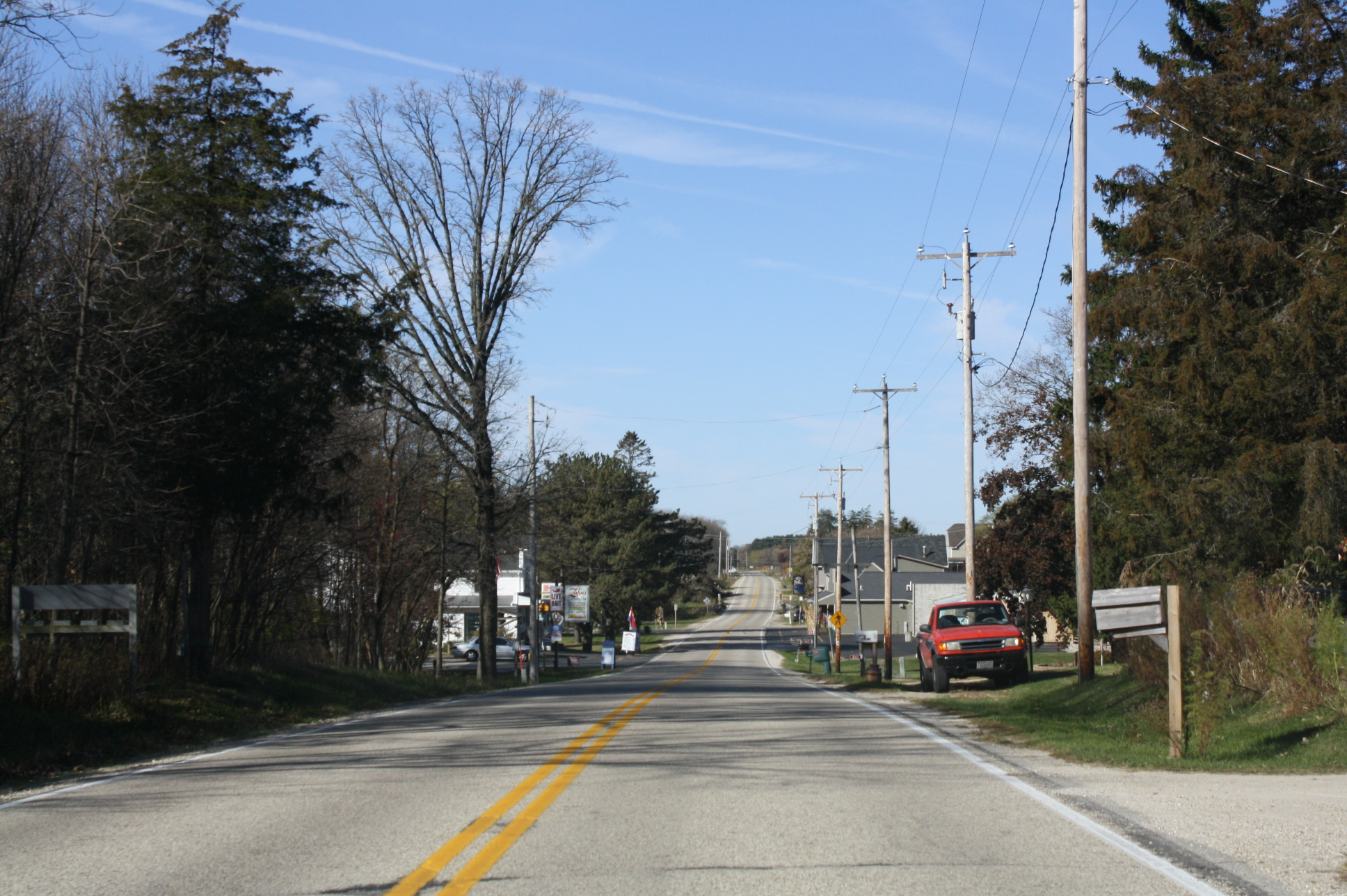
- Looking west in downtown New Prospect

- Location within Wisconsin Location within the United States
- Coordinates: 43°36′57″N 88°10′43″W
- Country: United States
- State: Wisconsin
- County: Fond du Lac
- Elevation: 984 ft (300 m)
- Time zone: UTC-6 (Central (CST))
  - Summer (DST): UTC-5 (CDT)
- Area code: 920
- GNIS feature ID: 1570230

New Prospect is located in the town of Auburn, in Fond du Lac County, Wisconsin, United States. New Prospect is located in the Kettle Moraine State Forest along County Highway SS, 5 miles (8.0 km) east-northeast of Campbellsport.

== Images ==
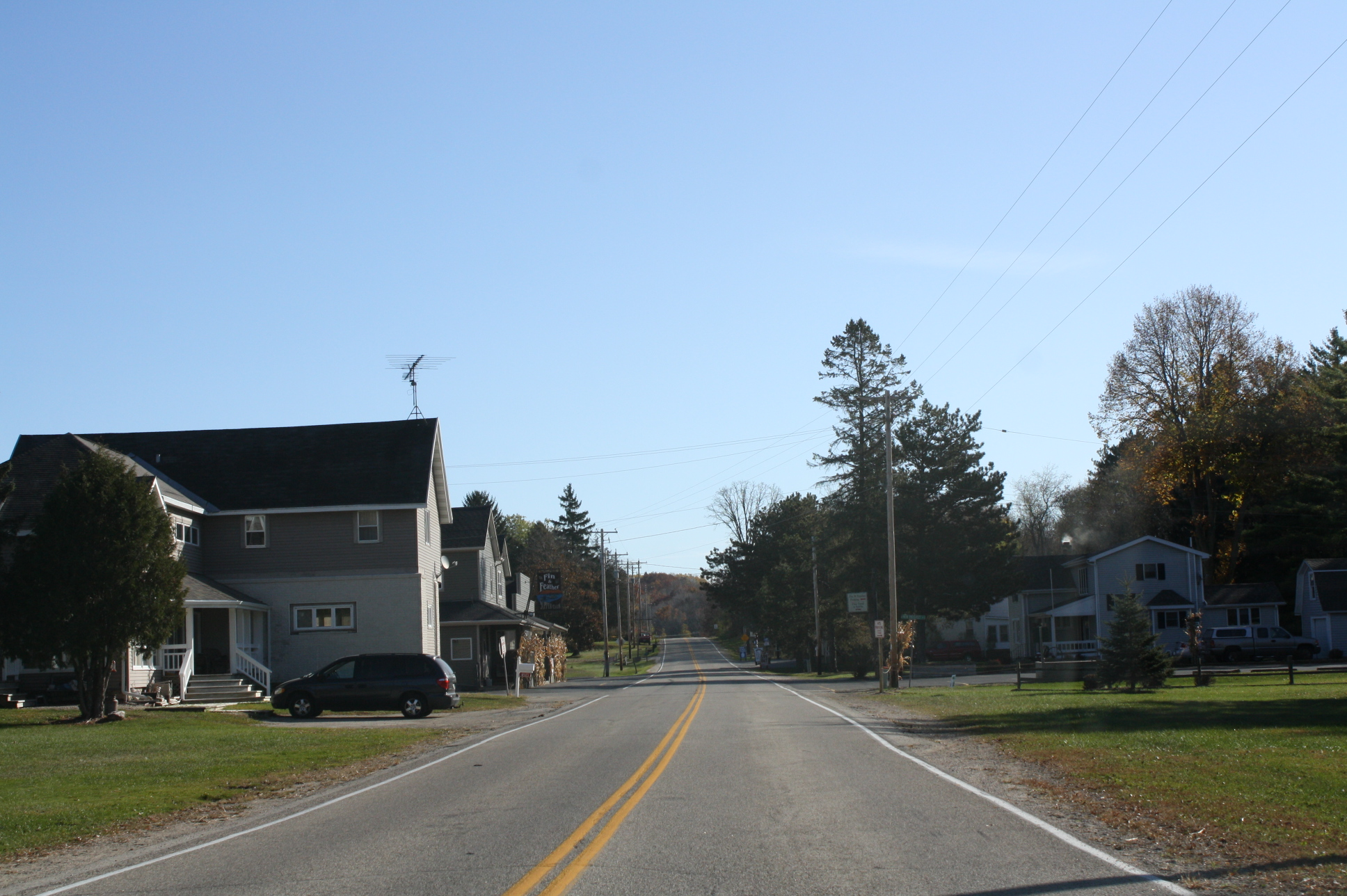
Looking east in downtown New Prospect

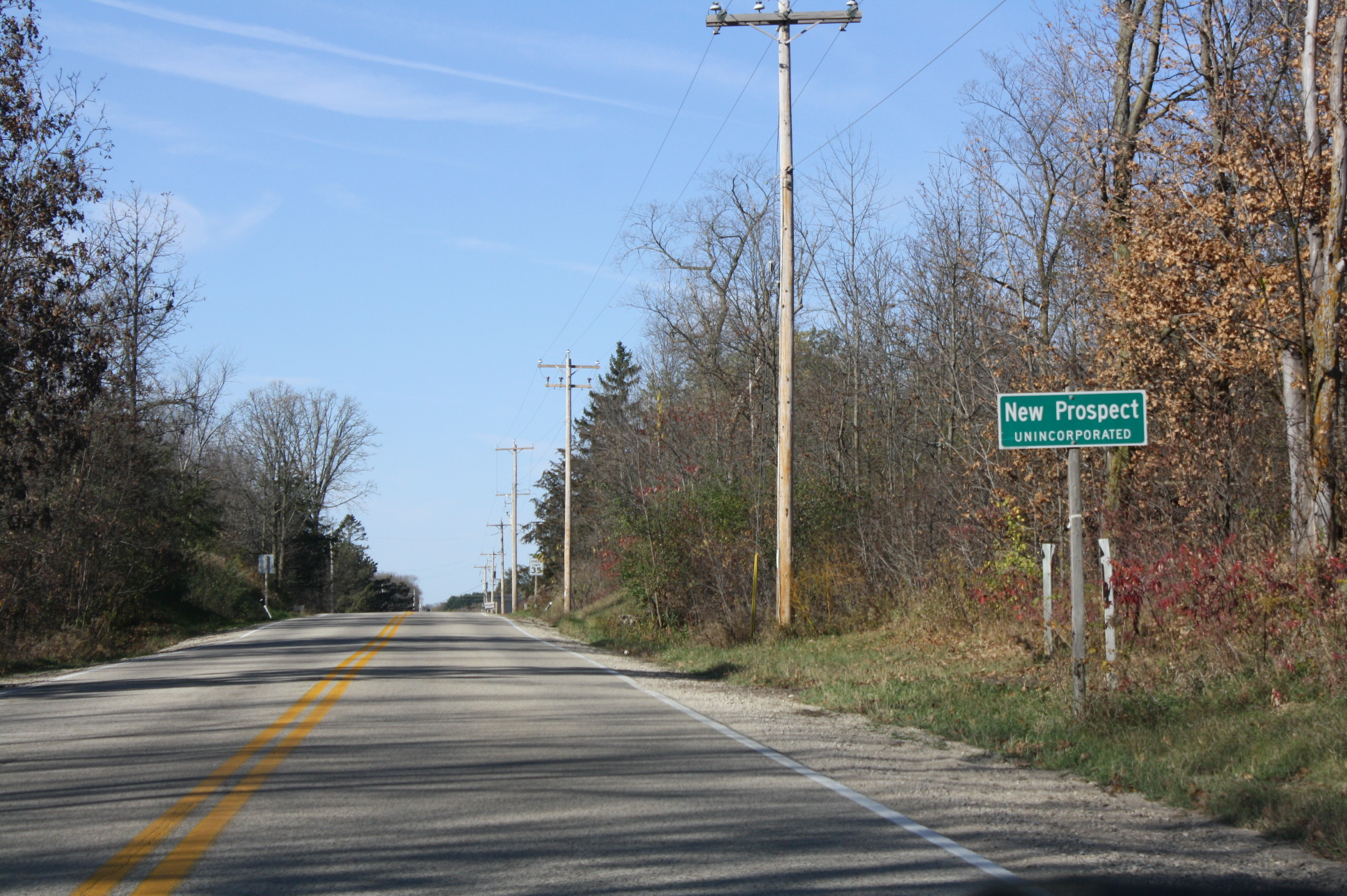
Sign for New Prospect
