= Lamartine, Wisconsin =

- Town
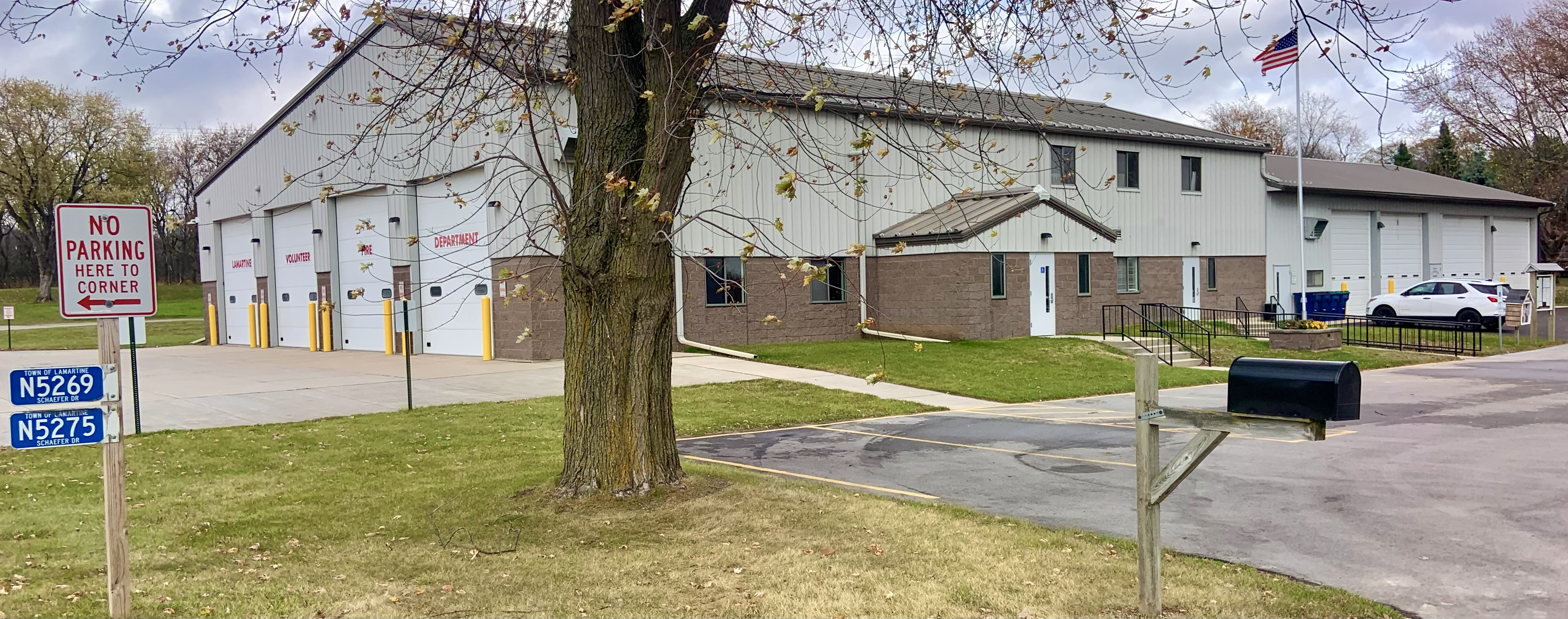
- Town hall

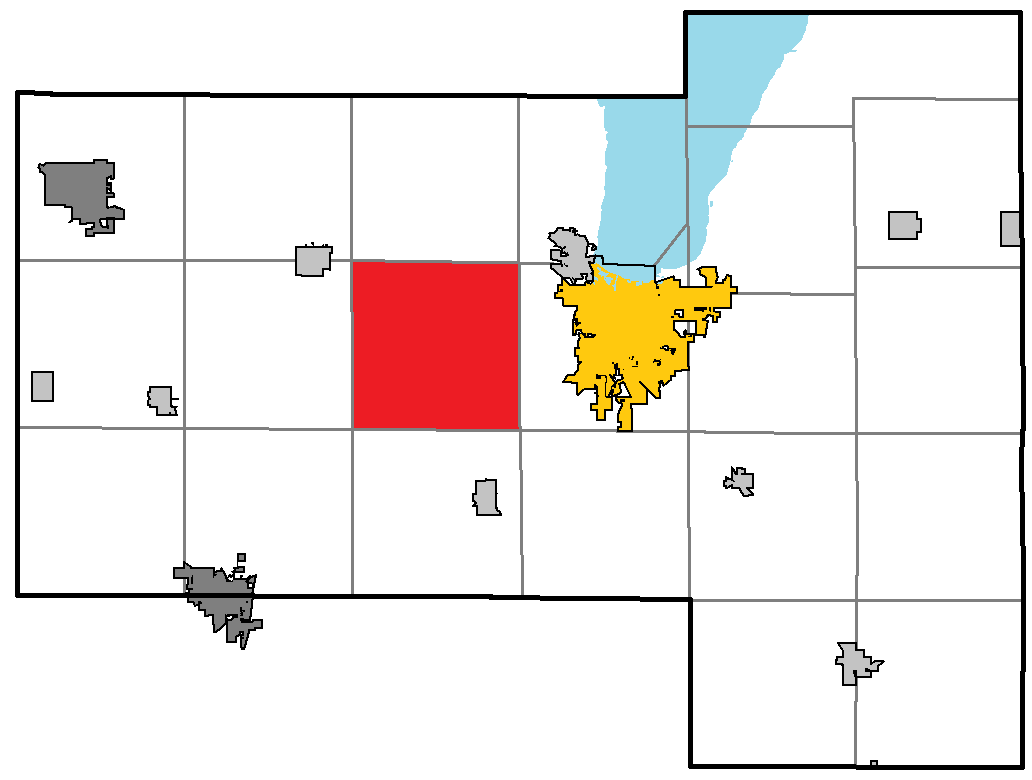
- Location of Lamartine, within Fond du Lac County
- Coordinates: 43°45′41″N 88°34′31″W
- Country: United States
- State: Wisconsin
- County: Fond du Lac

Area
  - Total: 36.6 sq mi (94.7 km^{2})
  - Land: 36.5 sq mi (94.5 km^{2})
  - Water: 0.077 sq mi (0.2 km^{2})
- Elevation: 890 ft (270 m)

Population (2020)
  - Total: 1,747
  - Density: 47.9/sq mi (18.5/km^{2})
- Time zone: UTC-6 (Central (CST))
  - Summer (DST): UTC-5 (CDT)
- Zip Codes: 53065, 54937
- Area code: 920
- FIPS code: 55-42125
- GNIS feature ID: 1583521
- Website: https://townoflamartinewi.gov/

Lamartine (originally called Seven-Mile-Creek or Seven Mile Creek) is a town in Fond du Lac County, Wisconsin, United States. The population was 1,747 at the 2020 census. The unincorporated communities of Lamartine, Rogersville, and Woodhull are located in the town.

== Geography ==
According to the United States Census Bureau, the town has a total area of 36.6 square miles (94.7 km^{2}), of which 36.5 square miles (94.5 km^{2}) is land and 0.1 square mile (0.2 km^{2}) (0.19%) is water.

== Demographics ==
As of the census of 2000, there were 1,616 people, 581 households, and 460 families residing in the town. The population density was 44.3 people per square mile (17.1/km^{2}). There were 599 housing units at an average density of 16.4 per square mile (6.3/km^{2}). The racial makeup of the town was 98.27% White, 0.37% African American, 0.12% Native American, 0.12% Asian, 0.19% Pacific Islander, 0.06% from other races, and 0.87% from two or more races. Hispanic or Latino of any race were 1.05% of the population.

There were 581 households, out of which 33.6% had children under the age of 18 living with them, 71.1% were married couples living together, 5.0% had a female householder with no husband present, and 20.7% were non-families. 15.8% of all households were made up of individuals, and 5.7% had someone living alone who was 65 years of age or older. The average household size was 2.78 and the average family size was 3.13.

In the town, the population was spread out, with 25.6% under the age of 18, 7.6% from 18 to 24, 28.4% from 25 to 44, 27.8% from 45 to 64, and 10.5% who were 65 years of age or older. The median age was 39 years. For every 100 females, there were 109.3 males. For every 100 females age 18 and over, there were 113.1 males.

The median income for a household in the town was $54,400, and the median income for a family was $58,750. Males had a median income of $40,433 versus $22,375 for females. The per capita income for the town was $25,202. About 3.3% of families and 3.3% of the population were below the poverty line, including 4.1% of those under age 18 and 10.1% of those age 65 or over.

== History ==
Named after Alphonse de Lamartine, the French poet, historian, and statesman who was a leading figure in the French Revolution of 1848 and the formation of the Second Republic. Peter V. Sang, an organizer of the Seven Mile Creek Community, and then its postmaster and town clerk, circulated a petition to change the name of the town from Seven Mile Creek to Lamartine, in honor of the French revolutionary, whose works and political activity had been acknowledged by the United States Government on April 26, 1848, by formal diplomatic recognition. On June 13, 1848, a bill was offered to the First Wisconsin Legislature, to change the name of the community from Seven Mile Creek to Lamartine. The bill was passed and signed into law by Governor Nelson Dewey on August 8, 1848.

== Notable people ==
- Charles E. Broughton, businessman, newspaper publisher, politician and civic leader
- Louis Eidemiller, physician and member of the Wisconsin State Assembly
- Philip Greening, blacksmith-machinist turned farmer, and member of the Wisconsin State Assembly
- Oliver Elwin Wells, Wisconsin Superintendent of Public Instruction
