= Auburn, Fond du Lac County, Wisconsin =

Auburn, Wisconsin
- Town
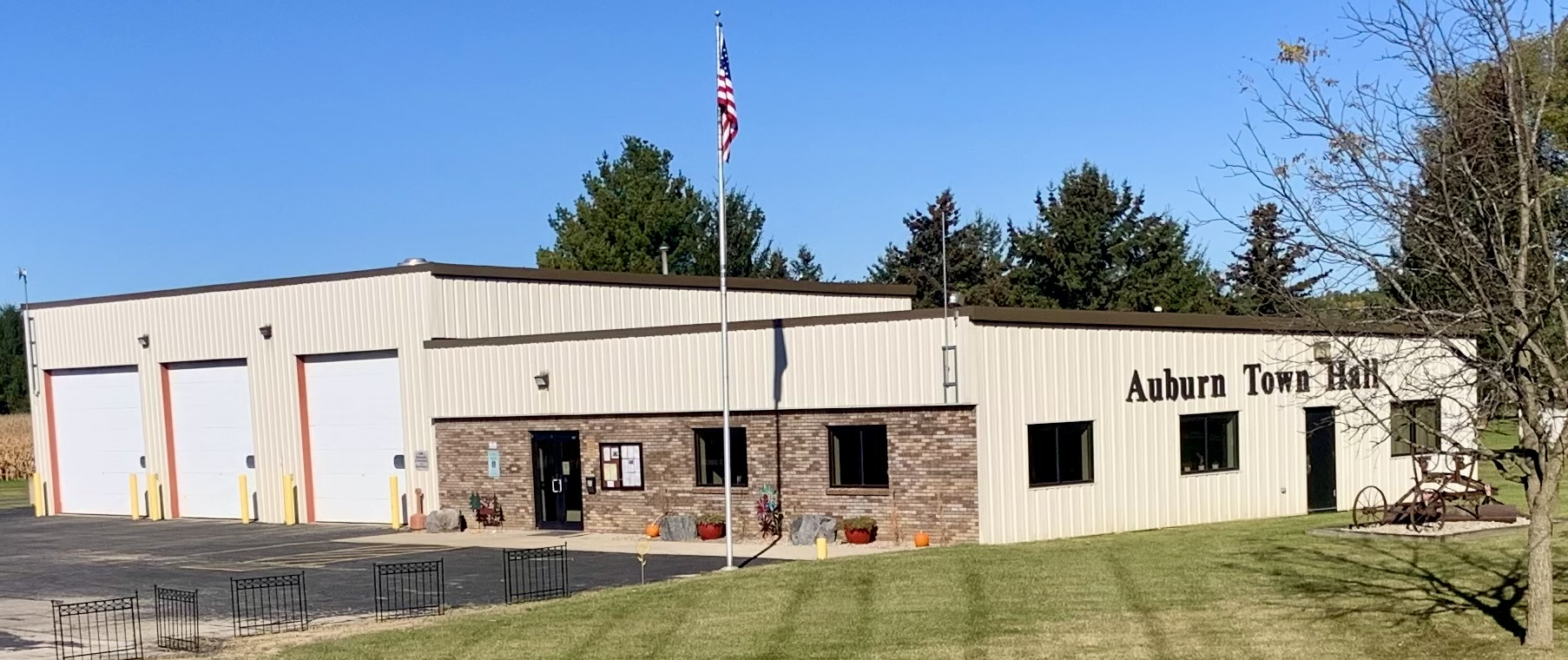
- Town hall

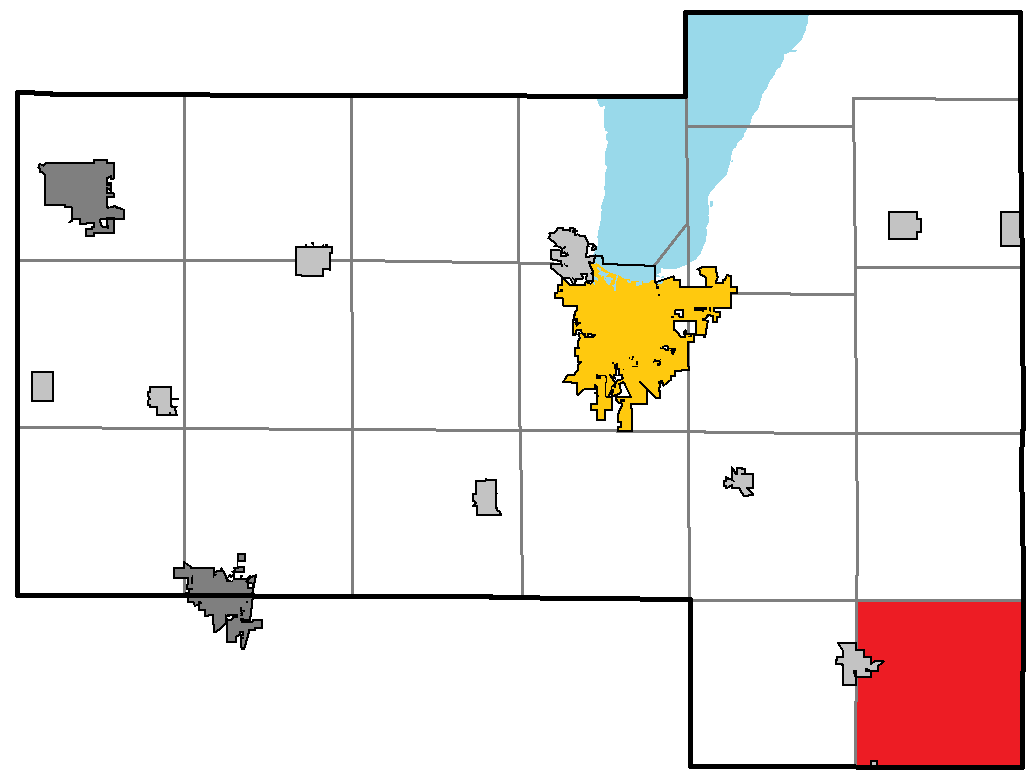
- Location of Auburn, within Fond du Lac County
- Coordinates: 43°35′15″N 88°12′49″W
- Country: United States
- State: Wisconsin
- County: Fond du Lac

Area
  - Total: 35.8 sq mi (92.6 km^{2})
  - Land: 35.2 sq mi (91.1 km^{2})
  - Water: 0.58 sq mi (1.5 km^{2})
- Elevation: 968 ft (295 m)

Population (2020)
  - Total: 2,360
  - Density: 67.1/sq mi (25.9/km^{2})
- Time zone: UTC-6 (Central (CST))
  - Summer (DST): UTC-5 (CDT)
- Zip code: 53010 (small portions of) nearby Kewaskum, Wisconsin's zip code 53040
- Area code: 920 262
- FIPS code: 55-03750
- GNIS feature ID: 1582730

Auburn is a town in Fond du Lac County, Wisconsin, United States. The population was 2,360 at the 2020 census. The unincorporated communities of New Fane and New Prospect are located within Auburn. The ghost town of New Cassel was also located in Auburn.

== History ==
Two brothers who settled the area named the town after their hometown—Auburn, New York.

== Geography ==
According to the United States Census Bureau, the town has a total area of 35.8 square miles (92.6 km^{2}), of which 35.2 square miles (91.1 km^{2}) is land and 0.6 square mile (1.5 km^{2}) (1.59%) is water.

== Demographics ==
As of the census of 2000, there were 2,075 people, 732 households, and 603 families residing in the town. The population density was 59.0 people per square mile (22.8/km^{2}). There were 758 housing units at an average density of 21.5 per square mile (8.3/km^{2}). The racial makeup of the town was 97.98% White, 0.05% African American, 1.06% Native American, 0.14% Asian, 0.10% Pacific Islander, 0.34% from other races, and 0.34% from two or more races. Hispanic or Latino of any race were 0.96% of the population.

There were 732 households, out of which 38.7% had children under the age of 18 living with them, 75.8% were married couples living together, 3.4% had a female householder with no husband present, and 17.5% were non-families. 13.0% of all households were made up of individuals, and 4.0% had someone living alone who was 65 years of age or older. The average household size was 2.83 and the average family size was 3.11.

In the town, the population was spread out, with 26.5% under the age of 18, 6.9% from 18 to 24, 31.6% from 25 to 44, 25.3% from 45 to 64, and 9.8% who were 65 years of age or older. The median age was 37 years. For every 100 females, there were 106.9 males. For every 100 females age 18 and over, there were 106.4 males.

The median income for a household in the town was $57,986, and the median income for a family was $60,174. Males had a median income of $38,464 versus $24,844 for females. The per capita income for the town was $21,013. About 1.0% of families and 1.3% of the population were below the poverty line, including none of those under age 18 and 5.1% of those age 65 or over.

== Notable people ==
- James Bannon, politician and farmer, was born in the town; he served on the Auburn Town Board and was the town board chairman
