= Woodhull, Wisconsin =

- Unincorporated community
- Location within Wisconsin Location within the United States
- Coordinates: 43°46′39″N 88°34′23″W
- Country: United States
- State: Wisconsin
- County: Fond du Lac
- Elevation: 909 ft (277 m)
- Time zone: UTC-6 (Central (CST))
  - Summer (DST): UTC-5 (CDT)
- Zip Codes: 54932
- Area code: 920
- GNIS feature ID: 1577891

Woodhull is an unincorporated community located in the town of Lamartine, Fond du Lac County, Wisconsin, United States.

== Location ==
Woodhull is located at the junction of County Road Y and Forest Ave. Our Risen Savior Catholic Church is located on the south eastern corner of the intersection. There is one bar, and a few houses throughout the remainder of the community.

== History ==
A post office called Woodhull was established in 1864, and remained in operation until it was discontinued in 1904. The community was named for Nathaniel Woodhull, a military general in the American Revolutionary War or possibly for John Woodhull, the deputy postmaster at Fond du Lac, Wisconsin at the time.

== Images ==
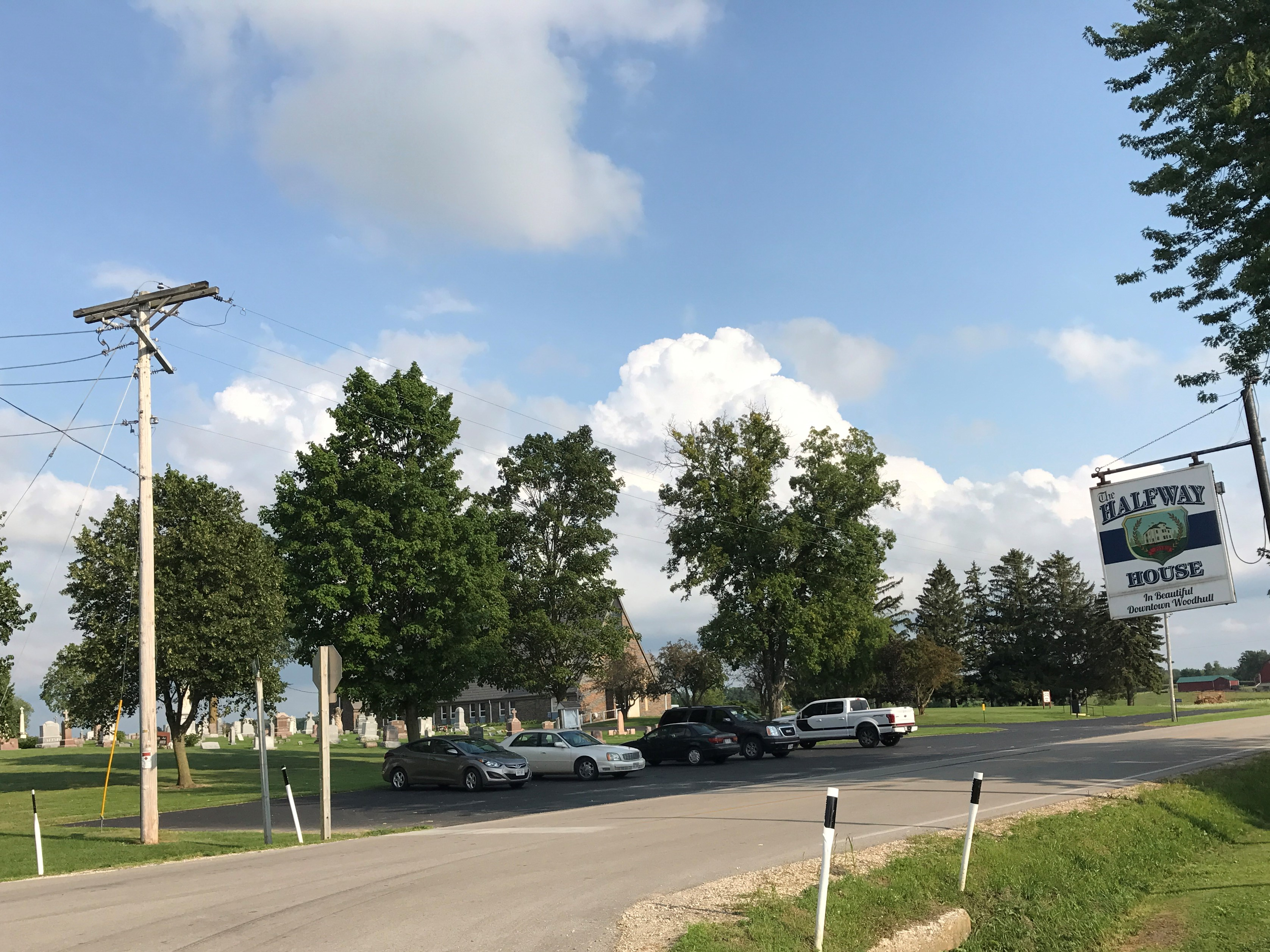
Woodhull, Wisconsin looking SE at Our Risen Savior Church

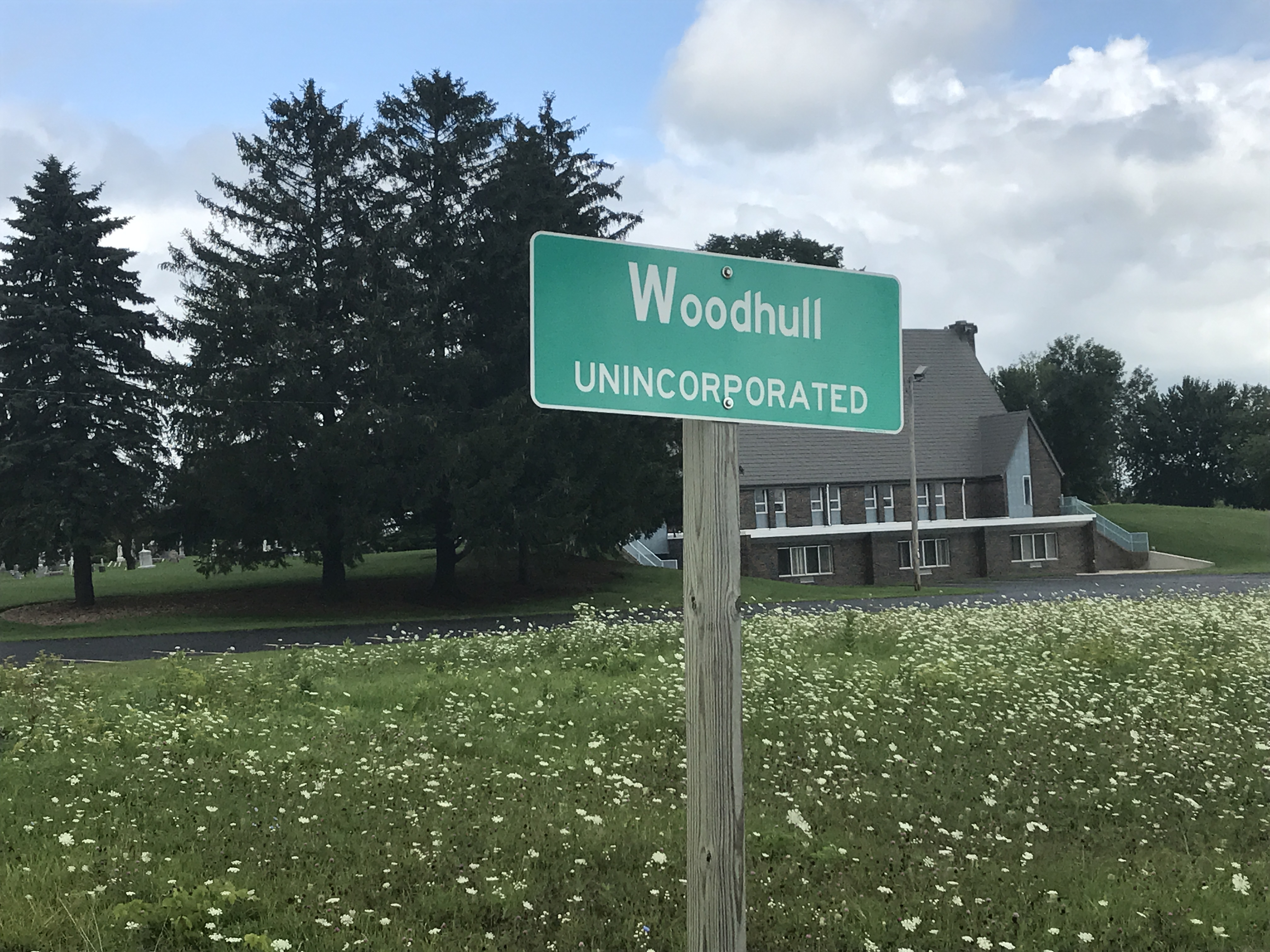
Sign showing Woodhull, Wisconsin

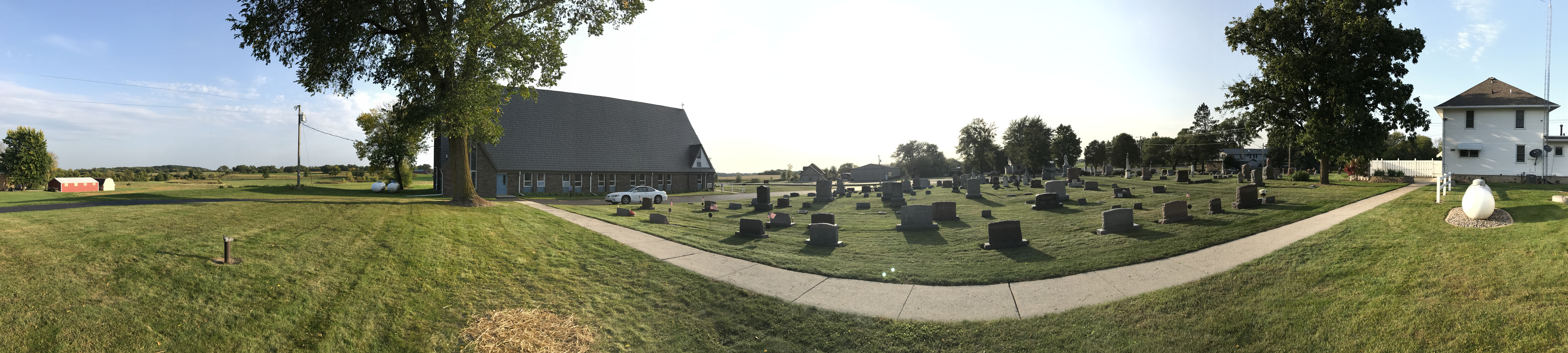
Panorama of Woodhull
