= Louis Eidemiller =

American politician

Louis Eidemiller (March 3, 1851 – November 16, 1888) was an American medical doctor and politician.

Born in New York City, Eidemiller settled in the town of Lamartine, Fond du Lac County, Wisconsin in 1855. In 1875, he received his medical degree from Ohio Medical College in Cincinnati, Ohio or in Chicago. He lived in New Cassel, Wisconsin and served in the Wisconsin State Assembly in 1882 as a Democrat. Eidemiller was also a reporter for a newspaper in Fond du Lac, Wisconsin. Eidemiller died in Milwaukee, Wisconsin from blood poisoning as a result of a leg injury.
