= Halder, Wisconsin =

Unincorporated community in Wisconsin, United States

- Unincorporated community
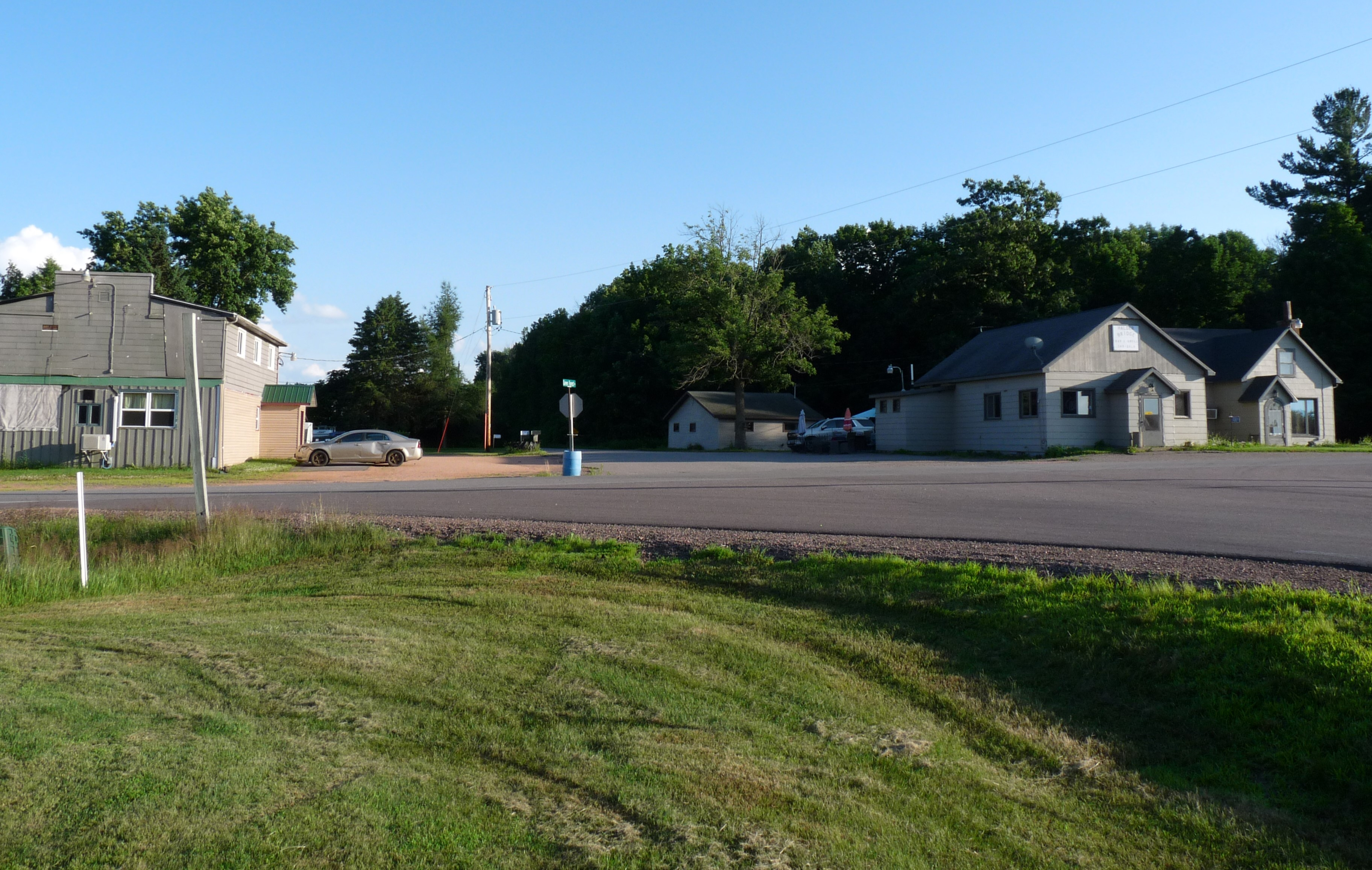
- Halder, facing south

- Location within Wisconsin Location within the United States
- Coordinates: 44°47′57″N 89°52′14″W
- Country: United States
- State: Wisconsin
- County: Marathon
- Elevation: 1,191 ft (363 m)
- Time zone: UTC-6 (Central (CST))
  - Summer (DST): UTC-5 (CDT)
- ZIP code: 54455
- Area codes: 715 and 534
- GNIS feature ID: 1565968

Halder is an unincorporated community located in the town of Emmet, Marathon County, Wisconsin, United States. The community was named for George Halder, a Wausau, Wisconsin alderman. The post office was established in July 1887.

== Notable people ==
- Thomas O'Connor, farmer and politician, lived in Halder.
