= Christopher Hinn =

American politician

Christopher Hinn (June 6, 1855 – March 15, 1926) was an American miller and politician.

Born in the town of Marion, Grant County, Wisconsin, Hinn was a miller. He served as Marion Town clerk and was involved with the Mutual Fire Insurance Company. In 1891, Hinn served in the Wisconsin State Assembly and was a Democrat. Hinn moved to Plainview, Texas in 1908 to assist his son Albert with his milling business. He purchased a wheat elevator and mill in Plainview, Texas in 1910. The mill was damaged by fire in January 1926, and Hinn died suddenly while working at the mill in Plainview or Longview, Texas.
