= Omar L. Rosenkrans =

American politician

Omar L. Rosenkrans was a member of the Wisconsin State Assembly.

== Biography ==
Rosenkrans was born in Steuben County, New York in 1843. During the American Civil War, he served with the Union Army. He died in 1926.

== Assembly career ==
Rosenkrans was a member of the Assembly during the 1891 and 1893 sessions. He was a Republican.
