= Port Edwards (town), Wisconsin =

Port Edwards
- Town
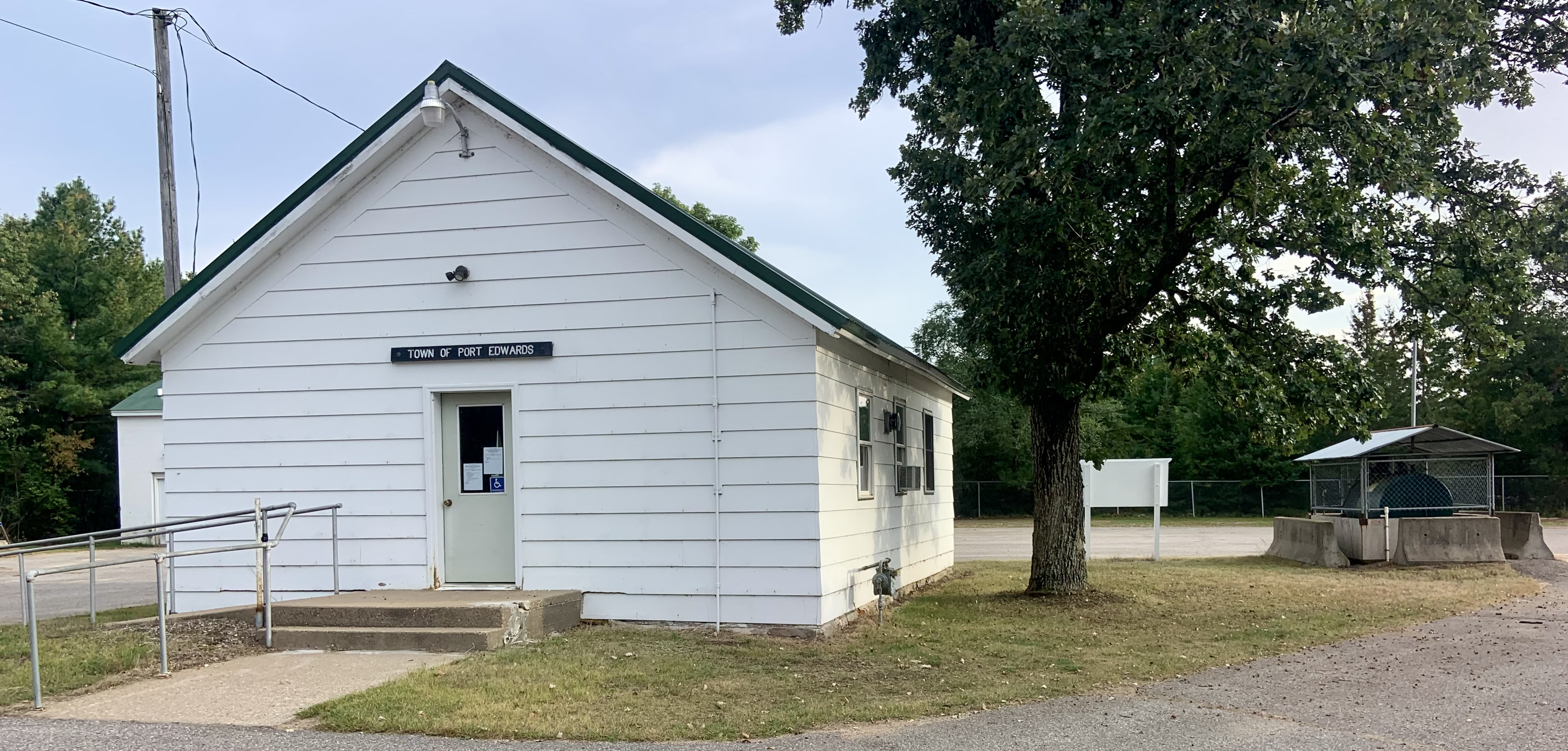
- Town hall

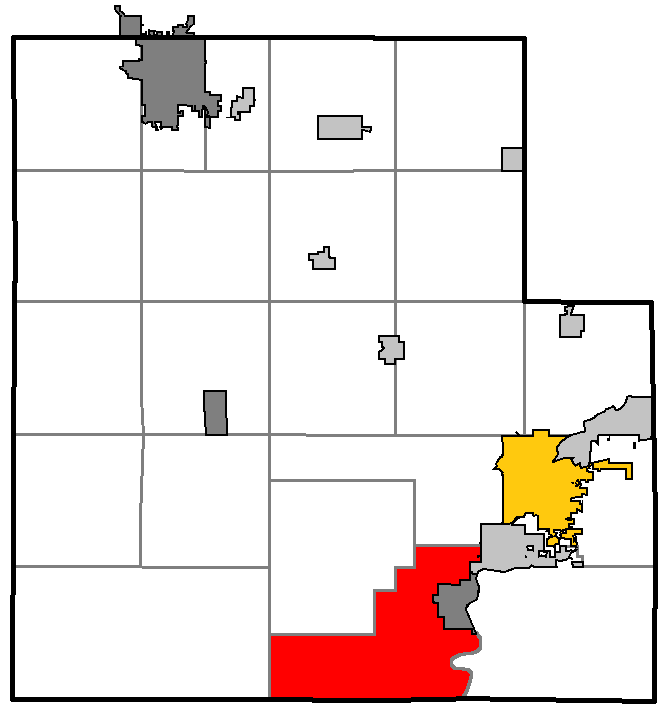
- Location within Wood County

- Location within the state of Wisconsin
- Coordinates: 44°20′38″N 89°51′28″W
- Country: United States
- State: Wisconsin
- County: Wood

Area
  - Total: 39.2 sq mi (101.6 km^{2})
  - Land: 38.6 sq mi (100.0 km^{2})
  - Water: 0.62 sq mi (1.6 km^{2})

Population (2020)
  - Total: 1,356
  - Density: 35.12/sq mi (13.56/km^{2})
- Time zone: UTC-6 (Central (CST))
  - Summer (DST): UTC-5 (CDT)
- Area codes: 715 & 534
- PLSS township: parts of T21N R4E, T21N R5E, and T22N R5E
- Website: https://www.townofportedwardswi.org/

Port Edwards is a town in Wood County, Wisconsin, United States. The population was 1,356 at the 2020 census. The village of Port Edwards is located to the northeast of and adjacent to the town. The town contains the Ho-Chunk community of Ceex Haci.

== Geography ==
According to the United States Census Bureau, the town has a total area of 39.2 square miles (101.6 km^{2}), of which 38.6 square miles (100.0 km^{2}) is land and 0.6 square mile (1.6 km^{2}) (1.58%) is water.

== History ==
The part of the town of Port Edwards within three miles of the Wisconsin River was in the "Indian strip" ceded by the Menominee to the U.S. government in the 1836 Treaty of the Cedars. As such, it was logged and surveyed earlier than land farther from the river. In 1839 a crew working for the U.S. government surveyed what would become parts of Port Edwards, walking through the woods and crossing the river, measuring with chain and compass. In 1851 a different crew surveyed the section lines. For the six mile square that now contains Nekoosa and the village of Port Edwards, the deputy surveyor gave this general description:

The character of the Soil in this town is very uniform. The Uplands are all pine barrens on a light Sandy Soil. the timber nearly all burned off by the yearly Indian fires. The large pines, valuable for lumber, are all gone. The bottom lands tho somewhat better, are sandy & not sufficiently large to make them valuable. Inhabitants are very scarce thin(?) being a Single house at Pt. Bausse, a noted(?) place for refitting rafts after passing the rapids before their final departure for the Mississippi, & a French hamlet on Section 1. On the whole it may be said of this town that for soil or timber it is nearly worthless. The Islands in the river are all overflowed & are neither valuable for size, soil, or timber & were therefore not meandered.

Port Edwards was established in 1874, taking its name from the village of the same name within its borders.

== Demographics ==
As of the census of 2000, there were 1,446 people, 526 households, and 399 families residing in the town. The population density was 37.4 people per square mile (14.5/km^{2}). There were 555 housing units at an average density of 14.4 per square mile (5.5/km^{2}). The racial makeup of the town was 91.01% White, 0.14% Black or African American, 5.26% Native American, 0.83% Asian, 2.07% from other races, and 0.69% from two or more races. 4.56% of the population were Hispanic or Latino of any race.

There were 526 households, out of which 35.9% had children under the age of 18 living with them, 64.1% were married couples living together, 8.7% had a female householder with no husband present, and 24.1% were non-families. 20.5% of all households were made up of individuals, and 6.3% had someone living alone who was 65 years of age or older. The average household size was 2.75 and the average family size was 3.17.

In the town, the population was spread out, with 30.7% under the age of 18, 6.1% from 18 to 24, 29.4% from 25 to 44, 23.9% from 45 to 64, and 10.0% who were 65 years of age or older. The median age was 36 years. For every 100 females, there were 103.4 males. For every 100 females age 18 and over, there were 102.4 males.

The median income for a household in the town was $43,804, and the median income for a family was $52,604. Males had a median income of $41,736 versus $26,250 for females. The per capita income for the town was $20,020. About 4.2% of families and 6.1% of the population were below the poverty line, including 6.8% of those under age 18 and 11.7% of those age 65 or over.

== Notable people ==
- John Edwards, lumberman and politician
