= James Bannon (Wisconsin politician) =

American politician

James Bannon (May 28, 1852 – March 6, 1938) was an American farmer and politician.

Born in the Town of Auburn, in Fond du Lac County, Wisconsin, Bannon graduated from the Fond du Lac High School and from Worthington Business School in Evanston, Illinois. He also went to Northwestern University. Bannon was a farmer. He served on the Auburn Town Board and was chairman. In 1891, Bannon served in the Wisconsin State Assembly, from New Cassel, Wisconsin, as a Democrat. In 1905, Bannon moved to a farm in Mott, Hettinger County, North Dakota. He served as a probate judge for Hettinger County and was involved with the Nonpartisan League. He lived in Bismarck, North Dakota and died there on March 6, 1938.
