= Ambrose McGuigan =

American politician

Ambrose McGuigan was a member of the Wisconsin State Assembly. McGugian was elected to the Assembly in 1890, representing the 11th District of Milwaukee County, Wisconsin. He was a Democrat. McGuigan was born on April 20, 1834, in what was then County Londonderry, Ireland.
