= Brown Olson =

American farmer and politician

Brown Olson (March 31, 1850 – March 8, 1897) was an American farmer and politician.

Born in the town of Christiana, Vernon County, Wisconsin, Olson was the first white child to be born in the town. Olson was a farmer. He served as chairman of the Christiana Town Board and was a Republican. In 1891, Olson served in the Wisconsin State Assembly.
