= C. Hugo Jacobi =

American politician

Charles Hugo Jacobi (April 18, 1846 – November 13, 1924) was an American businessman and politician.

Jacobi was born in Rockenhausen, Bavaria and emigrated to the United States in 1855. Jacobi settled in Watertown, Wisconsin. He went to the Spencerian College in Milwaukee, Wisconsin and to college in Germany. Jacobi worked for the Wisconsin National Bank and the Bank of Watertown. He was also involved in the insurance business. Jacobi also served as United Consul in Reichenberg, Austria. Jacobi served on the Watertown Common Council and on the board of education. Jacobi was a Democrat. He served in the Wisconsin Assembly from 1891 to 1895. Jacobi also worked as a gauger for the United States Internal Revenue during the first term of President Grover Cleveland. Jacobi died at his home in Watertown, Wisconsin after a long illness.
