= Marion, Grant County, Wisconsin =

Marion, Wisconsin
- Town
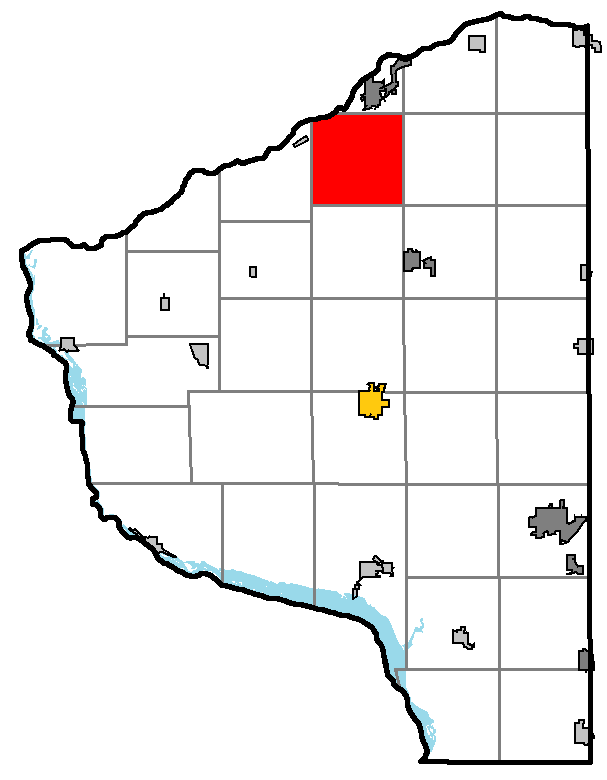
- Location of Marion in Grant County, Wisconsin

- Location of Grant County, Wisconsin
- Coordinates: 43°4′31″N 90°43′26″W
- Country: United States
- State: Wisconsin
- County: Grant

Area
  - Total: 35.7 sq mi (92.5 km^{2})
  - Land: 35.4 sq mi (91.8 km^{2})
  - Water: 0.31 sq mi (0.8 km^{2})
- Elevation: 974 ft (297 m)

Population (2020)
  - Total: 629
  - Density: 17.7/sq mi (6.85/km^{2})
- Time zone: UTC-6 (Central (CST))
  - Summer (DST): UTC-5 (CDT)
- Area code: 608
- FIPS code: 55-49350
- GNIS feature ID: 1583655
- Website: http://www.townofmarion.com/

Marion is a town in Grant County, Wisconsin, United States. The population was 629 at the 2020 census.

== Geography ==
According to the United States Census Bureau, the town has a total area of 35.7 square miles (92.5 km^{2}), of which 35.4 square miles (91.8 km^{2}) is land and 0.3 square mile (0.8 km^{2}) (0.81%) is water.

== Demographics ==
At the 2000 census there were 517 people, 180 households, and 149 families living in the town. The population density was 14.6 people per square mile (5.6/km^{2}). There were 204 housing units at an average density of 5.8 per square mile (2.2/km^{2}). The racial makeup of the town was 99.23% White, 0.19% African American, 0.19% Asian, 0.39% from other races. Hispanic or Latino of any race were 1.16%.

Of the 180 households 45.0% had children under the age of 18 living with them, 70.6% were married couples living together, 6.7% had a female householder with no husband present, and 17.2% were non-families. 12.2% of households were one person and 1.7% were one person aged 65 or older. The average household size was 2.87 and the average family size was 3.11.

The age distribution was 29.6% under the age of 18, 8.7% from 18 to 24, 30.6% from 25 to 44, 20.5% from 45 to 64, and 10.6% 65 or older. The median age was 32 years. For every 100 females, there were 117.2 males. For every 100 females age 18 and over, there were 110.4 males.

The median household income was $33,750 and the median family income was $33,750. Males had a median income of $22,614 versus $19,107 for females. The per capita income for the town was $12,942. About 8.2% of families and 8.5% of the population were below the poverty line, including 9.1% of those under age 18 and 10.4% of those age 65 or over.

== Notable people ==
- Christopher Hinn, miller and Wisconsin State Assembly, was born in the town
