= Christian A. Koenitzer =

American politician and businessman (1853–1912)

Christian August Koenitzer (March 31, 1853 – May 8, 1912) was an American politician and businessman.

Born in Wauwatosa, Milwaukee County, Wisconsin, Koenizner was educated in the public schools. He was in the real estate business, was a livestock dealer, and wholesale meat dealer. Koenitzer owned a saloon in Milwaukee, Wisconsin. From 1891 to 1895, Koenitzer served in the Wisconsin State Senate and was a Democrat. Koenitzer killed himself with a firearm in the back room of his saloon in Milwaukee, Wisconsin. Koenitzer was charged in district court for a statutory offense.
