= New Cassel, Wisconsin =

Village on Milwaukee River, Wisconsin, USA

Coordinates: 43°35′53″N 88°16′27″W

New Cassel or New Cassell, formerly Crouchville, was a village on the Milwaukee River in the northwestern corner of the Town of Auburn in Fond du Lac County, Wisconsin, United States. It was eventually absorbed into Campbellsport (the two had been called "The Twin Villages") after the latter was incorporated in 1902, and now constitutes the eastern end of that village.

It was the first settlement in Auburn, having been founded by one Ludin Crouch, a schoolteacher from New York State. Crouch and a Native American companion named Weh-aug-wok-na had come up the Milwaukee River in February 1846 in search of a good site to build a dam for waterpower, and found it at this spot. Crouch and his brother-in-law John Howell returned in the spring and claimed land on each side of the river, in order to build a sawmill. The dam was built; the new settlement was formally named Crouchville on July 4, 1846, and by fall Crouch's sawmill was in operation. It was the first in the region, and supplied demand as far away as Taycheedah. By 1856, having changed hands several times, it had fallen into disuse; one Emil Brayman purchased the site, and started to build a flour mill at that location. He got the village's name changed to New Cassel, after his homeland of Hesse-Cassel, but never completed the flour mill. At that time, the local post office, previously called the Auburn post office, was moved to the New Cassel mill and given the same name as the village.

By 1868, there was a hotel, a flour mill, three churches (Baptist, Catholic and "Protestant or Lutheran"), three general stores, a tin shop, two smithies, two tailors, two carpenters, a brick mason, a cabinet maker, two shoemakers, a harnessmaker, two breweries, a meat market, two saloons, a notary public, a cooper shop and a physician.

On April 28, 1874, Emma Franziska Höll (Sister Mary Alexia) and two other nuns arrived in New Cassel from Schwarzach, in the German Empire, to establish a new religious congregation. They built a boarding school in New Cassel, and in subsequent years built other facilities in Wisconsin, including a mission for Chippewa Indians in Reserve, Wisconsin and what would eventually become the SSSF motherhouse in Milwaukee.

As late as the Wisconsin State Gazetteer, 1919-20 it was listed as a separate settlement. The New Cassel post office was discontinued between 1923 and 1925.

== Notable people ==
- James Bamnnon, Wisconsin state legislator
- Louis Eidemiller, Wisconsin state legislator and physician
- The School Sisters of St. Francis, an order of teaching nuns founded and headquartered in New Cassel.
