= John Edwards (Wisconsin politician) =

American politician

John Edwards (September 15, 1831 – March 11, 1891) was an American politician born in England.

Born in England, Edwards moved with his family in 1832 to Hazel Green, Wisconsin. He went to California; he then moved to Port Edwards, Wisconsin, where he was a lumberman. He served as school treasurer, chairman of the Town of Port Edwards, and chairman of the Wood County, Wisconsin Board of Supervisors from 1884 to 1885. He served in the Wisconsin State Assembly as a Democrat in 1891. He died in Madison, Wisconsin while still in office.
