= Christiana, Vernon County, Wisconsin =

Christiana, Wisconsin
- Town
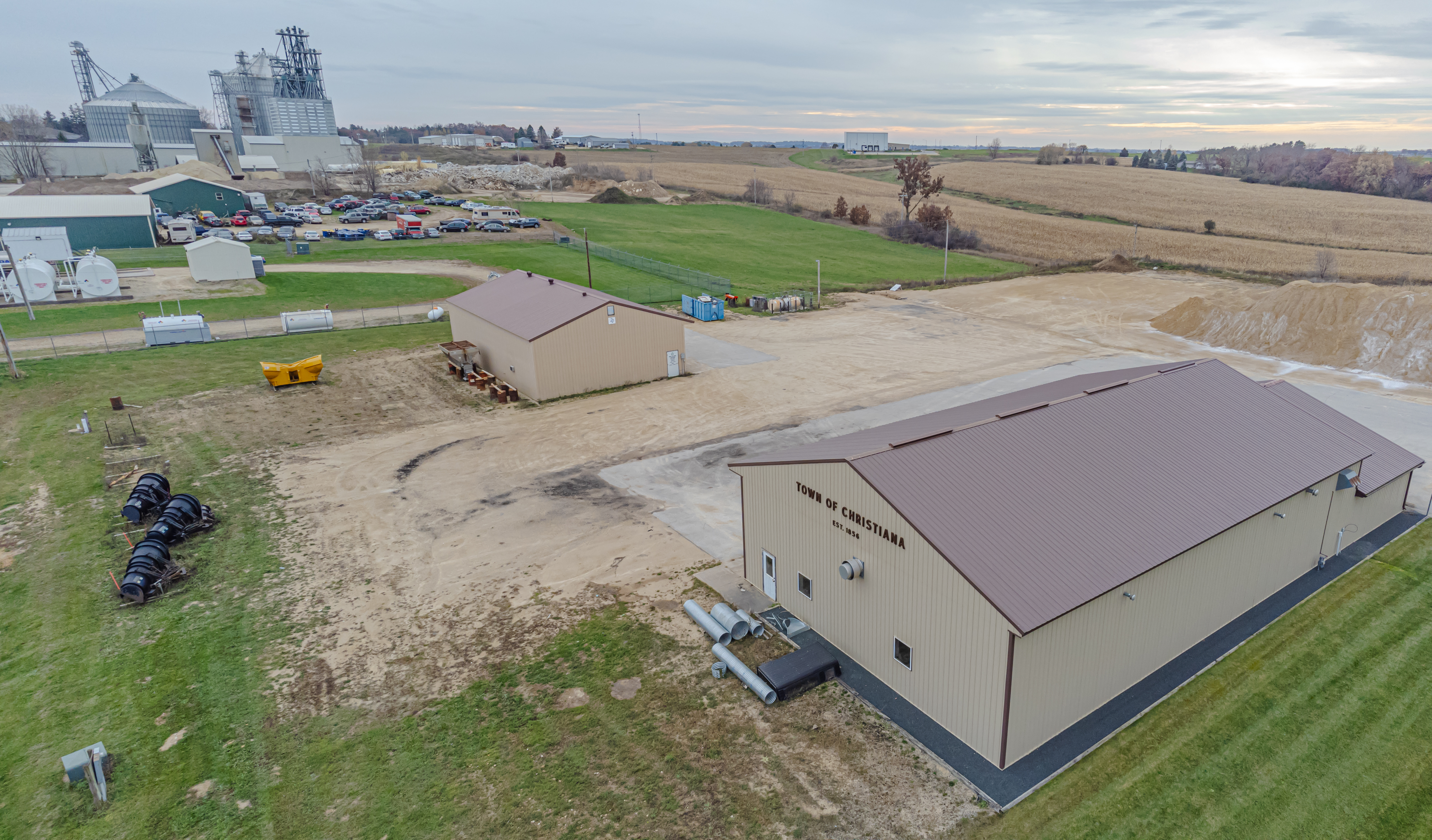
- Christiana Town Hall

- Location in Vernon County and the state of Wisconsin.
- Coordinates: 43°41′6″N 90°50′42″W
- Country: United States
- State: Wisconsin
- County: Vernon

Area
  - Total: 33.7 sq mi (87.2 km^{2})
  - Land: 33.6 sq mi (87.0 km^{2})
  - Water: 0.077 sq mi (0.2 km^{2})
- Elevation: 1,243 ft (379 m)

Population (2020)
  - Total: 993
  - Density: 29.6/sq mi (11.4/km^{2})
- Time zone: UTC-6 (Central (CST))
  - Summer (DST): UTC-5 (CDT)
- Area code: 608
- FIPS code: 55-14675
- GNIS feature ID: 1582960

Christiana is a town in Vernon County, Wisconsin, United States. The population was 993 at the 2020 census. The unincorporated community of Newry is located within the town.

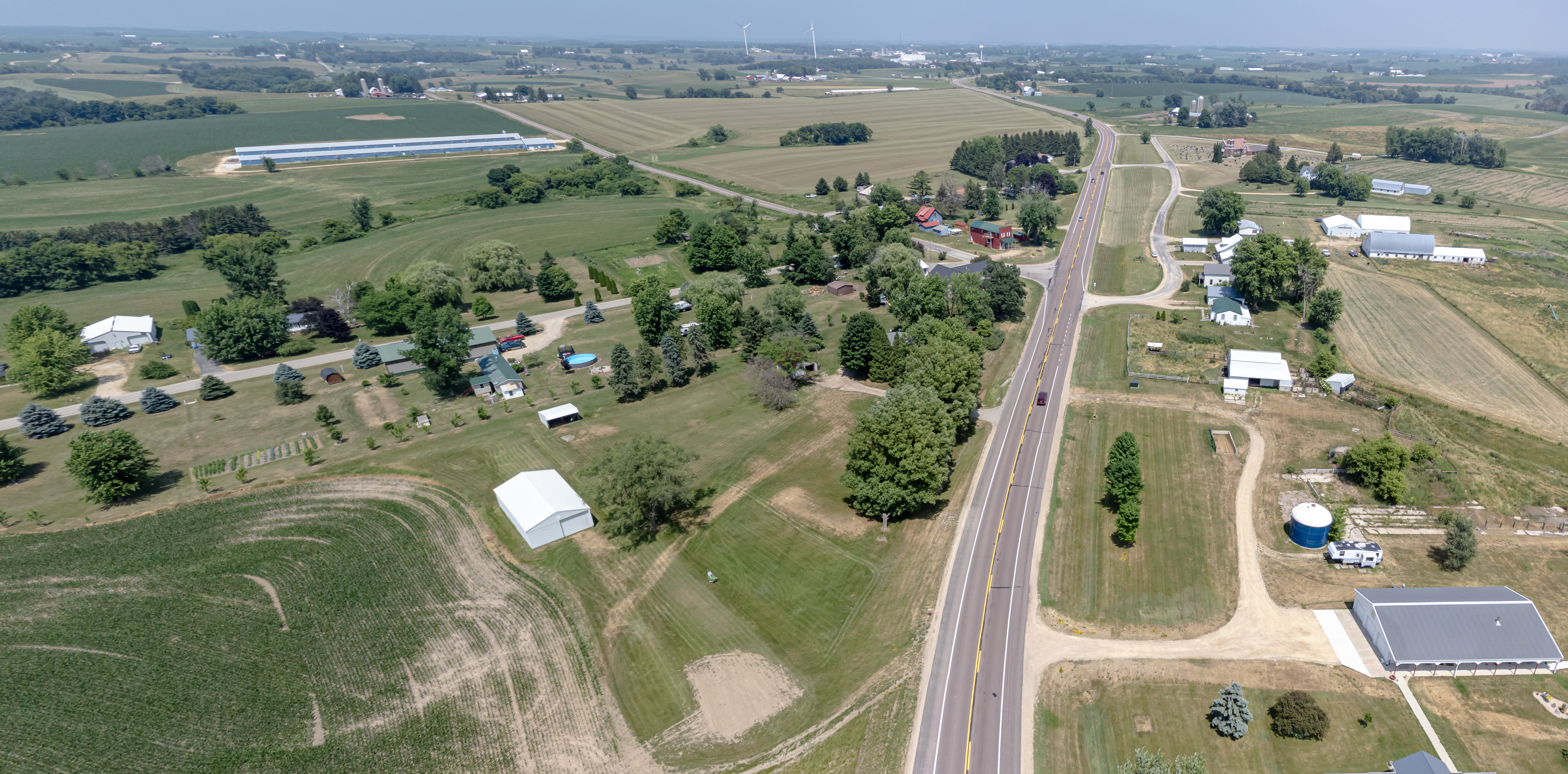
Newry, Wisconsin

== Geography ==
According to the United States Census Bureau, the town has a total area of 33.7 square miles (87.2 km^{2}), of which 33.6 square miles (86.9 km^{2}) is land and 0.1 square mile (0.2 km^{2}) (0.24%) is water.

== Demographics ==
As of the census of 2000, there were 871 people, 308 households, and 252 families residing in the town. The population density was 25.9 people per square mile (10.0/km^{2}). There were 341 housing units at an average density of 10.2 per square mile (3.9/km^{2}). The racial makeup of the town was 99.43% White, 0.11% African American, 0.11% Asian, and 0.34% from two or more races.

There were 308 households, out of which 38.6% had children under the age of 18 living with them, 71.4% were married couples living together, 6.5% had a female householder with no husband present, and 17.9% were non-families. 15.9% of all households were made up of individuals, and 6.5% had someone living alone who was 65 years of age or older. The average household size was 2.83 and the average family size was 3.15.

In the town, the population was spread out, with 28.8% under the age of 18, 6.2% from 18 to 24, 26.6% from 25 to 44, 26.6% from 45 to 64, and 11.7% who were 65 years of age or older. The median age was 39 years. For every 100 females, there were 108.4 males. For every 100 females age 18 and over, there were 111.6 males.

The median income for a household in the town was $34,875, and the median income for a family was $40,000. Males had a median income of $24,861 versus $22,891 for females. The per capita income for the town was $16,486. About 4.2% of families and 11.1% of the population were below the poverty line, including 22.6% of those under age 18 and 6.8% of those age 65 or over.

== Notable people ==
- Brown Olson, Wisconsin State Representative and farmer, was born in the town; Olson served as chairman of the Christiana Town Board
