= William F. Faber (politician) =

American politician

William F. Faber (January 3, 1858 – April 8, 1951) was an American building contractor and politician.

Born in Oshkosh, Wisconsin, Faber was educated in the public schools. He was a building contractor and owned a stone quarry. In 1888, Faber served on the Oshkosh Common Council and was a Democrat. In 1891, Faber served in the Wisconsin State Assembly. Faber died at his home in Oshkosh, Wisconsin.
