= Emmet, Marathon County, Wisconsin =

Town of Emmet, Wisconsin
- Town
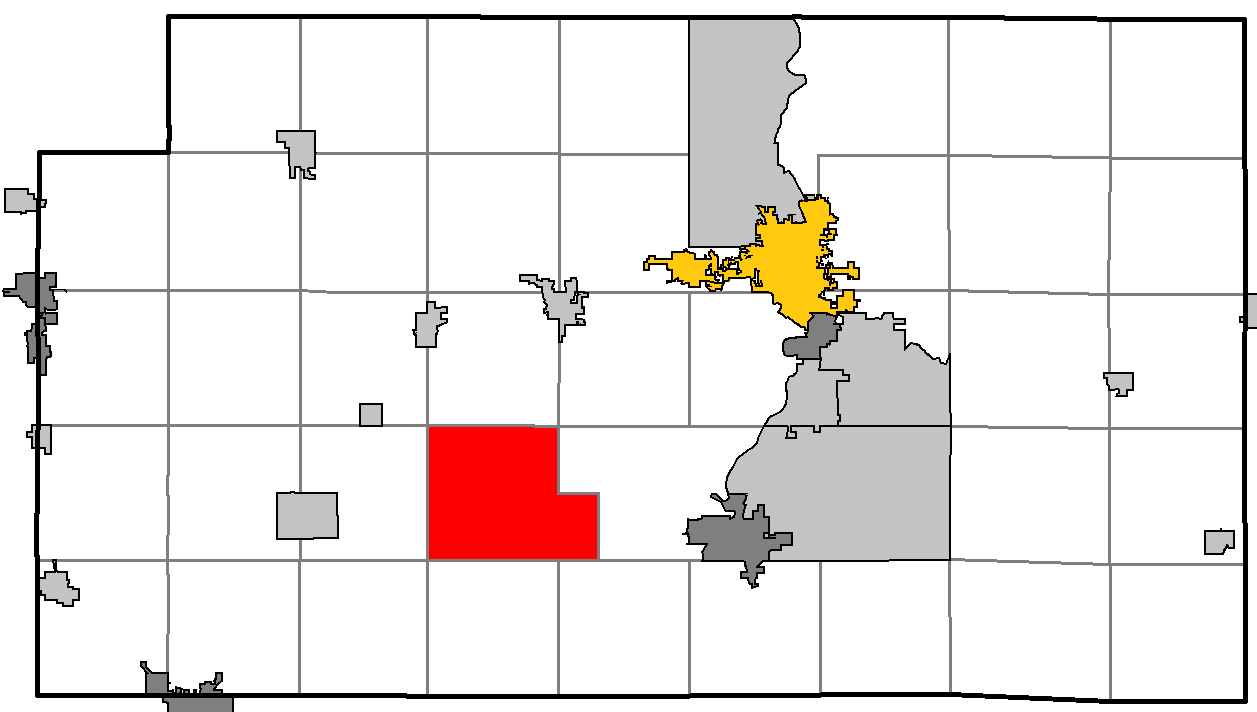
- Location of the Town of Emmet, Marathon County

- Location of Marathon County, Wisconsin
- Coordinates: 44°48′11″N 89°54′25″W
- Country: United States
- State: Wisconsin
- County: Marathon

Area
  - Total: 40.2 sq mi (104.1 km^{2})
  - Land: 39.8 sq mi (103.2 km^{2})
  - Water: 0.39 sq mi (1.0 km^{2})
- Elevation: 1,260 ft (384 m)

Population (2020)
  - Total: 905
  - Density: 22.7/sq mi (8.77/km^{2})
- Time zone: UTC-6 (Central (CST))
  - Summer (DST): UTC-5 (CDT)
- Area codes: 715 & 534
- FIPS code: 55-24025
- GNIS feature ID: 1583166
- Website: www.townofemmetwi.gov

Emmet is a town in Marathon County, Wisconsin, United States. It is part of the Wausau, Wisconsin Metropolitan Statistical Area. The population was 905 at the 2020 census. The unincorporated community of Halder is located in the town.

== Geography ==
According to the United States Census Bureau, the town has a total area of 40.2 square miles (104.1 km^{2}), of which 39.8 square miles (103.2 km^{2}) is land and 0.4 square miles (1.0 km^{2}), or 0.92%, is water.

== Demographics ==
At the 2000 census there were 842 people, 269 households, and 228 families in the town. The population density was 21.1 people per square mile (8.2/km^{2}). There were 288 housing units at an average density of 7.2 per square mile (2.8/km^{2}). The racial makeup of the town was 99.41% White, 0.12% African American, 0.12% Asian, 0.12% from other races, and 0.24% from two or more races. Hispanic or Latino of any race were 0.59%.

Of the 269 households 43.1% had children under the age of 18 living with them, 74.3% were married couples living together, 5.2% had a female householder with no husband present, and 14.9% were non-families. 11.5% of households were one person and 5.2% were one person aged 65 or older. The average household size was 3.13 and the average family size was 3.41.

The age distribution was 30.4% under the age of 18, 7.5% from 18 to 24, 29.6% from 25 to 44, 21.4% from 45 to 64, and 11.2% 65 or older. The median age was 35 years. For every 100 females, there were 111.0 males. For every 100 females age 18 and over, there were 113.1 males.

The median household income was $47,031 and the median family income was $47,596. Males had a median income of $30,461 versus $24,018 for females. The per capita income for the town was $16,902. About 7.8% of families and 9.9% of the population were below the poverty line, including 8.3% of those under age 18 and 15.4% of those age 65 or over.
