= 41st Wisconsin Legislature =

Wisconsin legislative term for 1893-1894

←	40th	42nd	→
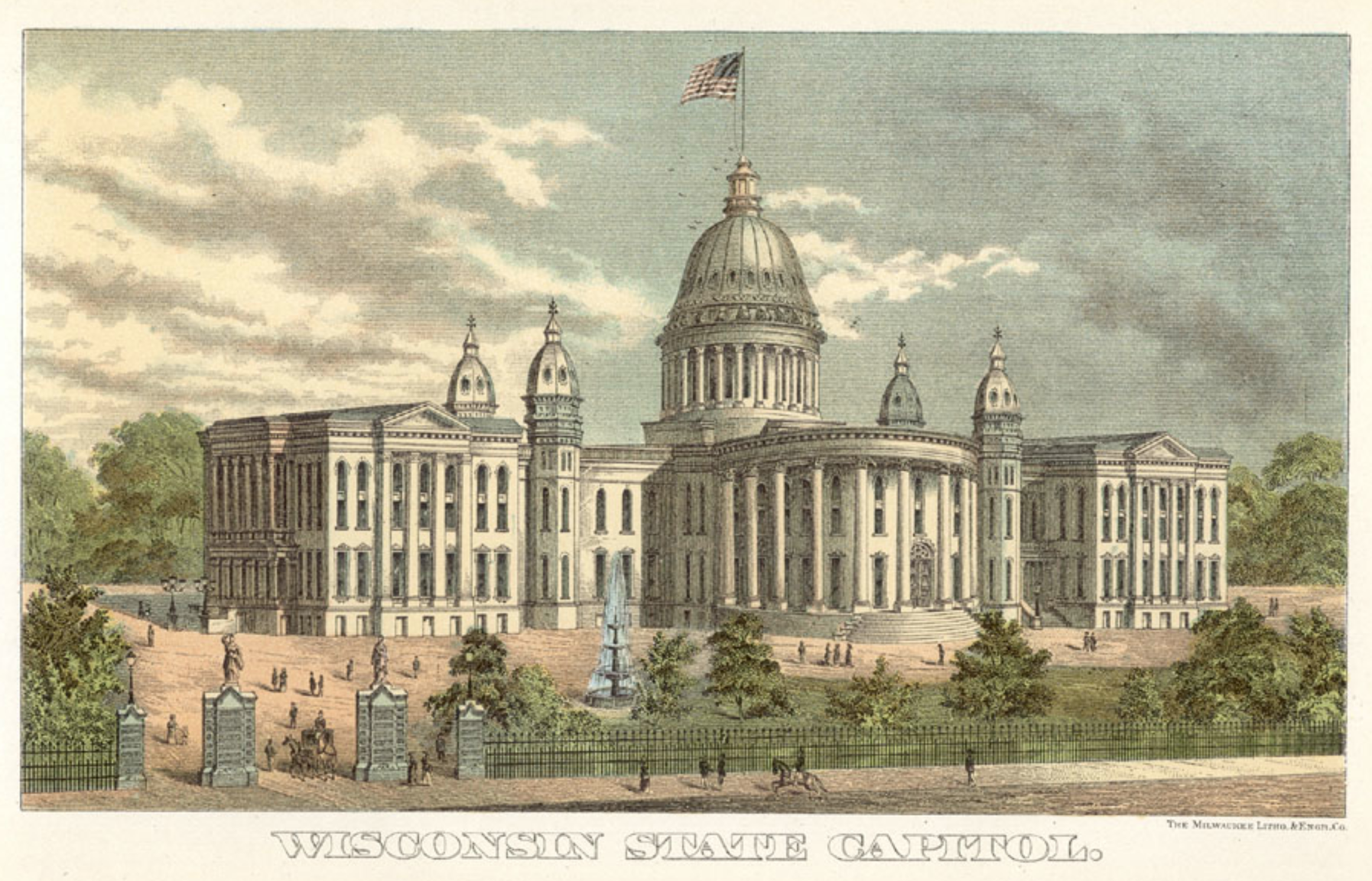
- Wisconsin State Capitol, 1887

Overview
- Legislative body: Wisconsin Legislature
- Meeting place: Wisconsin State Capitol
- Term: January 2, 1893 – January 7, 1895
- Election: November 8, 1892

Senate
- Members: 33
- Senate President: Charles Jonas (D) (until April 4, 1894)
- President pro tempore: Robert MacBride (D)
- Party control: Democratic

Assembly
- Members: 100
- Assembly Speaker: Edward Keogh (D)
- Party control: Democratic

Sessions
- 1st: January 11, 1893 – April 21, 1893

The Forty-First Wisconsin Legislature convened in the U.S. state of Wisconsin from January 11, 1893, to April 21, 1893, in regular session.

This was the first legislative session after the redistricting of the Senate and Assembly according to an act of the previous session.

Senators representing even-numbered districts were newly elected for this session and were serving the first two years of a four-year term. Assembly members were elected to a two-year term. Assembly members and even-numbered senators were elected in the general election of November 8, 1892. Senators representing odd-numbered districts were serving the third and fourth year of a four-year term, having been elected in the general election of November 4, 1890.

The governor of Wisconsin during this entire term was Democrat George Wilbur Peck, of Milwaukee County, serving his second two-year term, having won re-election in the 1892 Wisconsin gubernatorial election.

== Major events ==
- January 17, 1893: Hawaiian queen Liliʻuokalani was overthrown by American agents with the assistance of United States marines, ending the Hawaiian monarchy.
- January 27, 1893: John L. Mitchell was elected United States Senator by the Wisconsin Legislature in joint session.
- March 4, 1893: Inauguration of Grover Cleveland as the 24th President of the United States.
- April 7, 1893: Alfred W. Newman was elected to the Wisconsin Supreme Court, to the seat being vacated by the retirement of William P. Lyon.
- May 5, 1893: A crash of the New York Stock Exchange began the Panic of 1893.
- June 4, 1893: The Anti-Saloon League was incorporated at Oberlin, Ohio.
- January 1, 1894: As the senior-most member of the court, Harlow S. Orton became the 8th chief justice of the Wisconsin Supreme Court due to the retirement of William P. Lyon.
- April 4, 1894: Wisconsin lieutenant governor Charles Jonas resigned from office to accept appointment as U.S. consul to Saint Petersburg, Russia.
- April 21, 1894: The bituminous coal miners' strike of 1894 began, shutting down coal mines across the United States.
- July 4, 1894: The Republic of Hawaii was proclaimed by American agents.
- August 27, 1894: The Wilson–Gorman Tariff Act, which slightly reduced tariffs and imposed a tax on incomes over $4000, became law without the signature of President Grover Cleveland.
- November 6, 1894: William H. Upham elected Governor of Wisconsin.

== Major legislation ==
- April 19, 1893: An Act to make labor day a legal holiday, 1893 Act 271.
- Joint Resolution in relation to immigration, 1893 Joint Resolution 3. Expressing opposition to proposed immigration restrictions being considered in Congress.
- Joint Resolution to amend section 1, article 10, of the constitution of the state of Wisconsin, 1893 Joint Resolution 10. This was another attempt to update the section of the state constitution referring to the Superintendent of Public Instruction of Wisconsin to attempt to remove the constitutional limit on annual compensation. The previous attempt was rejected by voters in the 1888 general election.
- Joint Resolution proposing an amendment to subdivision 9, of section 31, of article 4, of the constitution of the state of Wisconsin, 1893 Joint Resolution 15. This was a proposed amendment to the state constitution to undo a constitutional amendment which had just been approved by the voters in 1892.

== Party summary ==
=== Senate summary ===
Senate partisan composition Democratic: 25 seats Republican: 7 seats Vacant: 1 seat

	Party (Shading indicates majority caucus)		Total	
	Dem.	Rep.	Total	Vacant
End of previous Legislature	19	14	33	0
Start of 1st Session	26	7	33	0
From Jan. 15, 1893 (Note: Democrat Frederick W. Horn (District 33) died.)	25	7	32	1
Final voting share	78.79%	21.21%		
Beginning of the next Legislature	13	20	33	0

=== Assembly summary ===
Assembly partisan composition Democratic: 56 seats Republican: 44 seats

	Party (Shading indicates majority caucus)			Total	
	Dem.	Lab.	Rep.	Total	Vacant
End of previous Legislature	65	1	32	98	2
Start of 1st Session	55	0	45	100	0
From Jan. 27, 1893 (Note: Democrat Daniel A. Mahoney (Kenosha) died.)	54	0	45	99	1
From Feb. 16, 1893 (Note: Democrat Peter Rademacher (Milwaukee 10th) replaced Republican Theodore Prochnow by decision of the Assembly Elections Committee.)	55	0	44	99	1
From Feb. 21, 1893 (Note: Democrat George H. Kroncke (Kenosha) replaced Daniel A. Mahoney (deceased).)	56	0	44	100	0
Final voting share	56%		44%		
Beginning of the next Legislature	19	0	81	100	0

== Sessions ==
- 1st Regular session: January 11, 1893 – April 21, 1893

== Leaders ==
=== Senate leadership ===
- President of the Senate: Charles Jonas (D) (until April 4, 1894)
- President pro tempore: Robert MacBride (D)

=== Assembly leadership ===
- Speaker of the Assembly: Edward Keogh (D)

== Members ==
=== Members of the Senate ===
Members of the Senate for the Forty-First Wisconsin Legislature:

Senate partisan representation Democratic: 25 seats Republican: 7 seats Vacant: 1 seat

Dist.	Counties	Senator	Residence	Party
01	Door, Kewaunee, & Marinette	John Fetzer	Forestville	Dem.
02	Brown & Oconto	Robert J. McGeehan	De Pere	Dem.
03	Kenosha & Racine	Adam Apple	Norway	Dem.
04	Milwaukee (City Northeast)	James W. Murphy	Milwaukee	Dem.
05	Milwaukee (City South)	Paul Bechtner	Milwaukee	Rep.
06	Milwaukee (City Center)	Oscar Altpeter	Milwaukee	Dem.
07	Northern Milwaukee & eastern Waukesha	Christian A. Koenitzer	Milwaukee	Dem.
08	Milwaukee (County South)	Michał Kruszka	Milwaukee	Dem.
09	Adams, Juneau, Marquette, & Green Lake	Ferdinand T. Yahr	Princeton	Dem.
10	Pierce, Polk, & St. Croix	William H. Phipps	Hudson	Rep.
11	Ashland, Bayfield, Burnett, Douglas, Sawyer, & Washburn	John T. Kingston	Ashland	Dem.
12	Marathon & Wood	Neal Brown	Wausau	Dem.
13	Eastern Columbia & southern Dodge	William Voss	Watertown	Dem.
14	Florence, Forest, Langlade, Lincoln, & Shawano	Dayne Wescott	Shawano	Dem.
15	Calumet & Manitowoc	William F. Nash	Two Rivers	Dem.
16	Crawford, Richland, & northern Grant	Charles H. Baxter	Lancaster	Rep.
17	Green, southeast Dane, & western Rock	Richard Burdge	Beloit	Rep.
18	Fond du Lac	Samuel M. Smead	Fond du Lac	Dem.
19	Winnebago	George W. Pratt	Oshkosh	Dem.
20	Sheboygan	Dennis T. Phalen	Sheboygan	Dem.
21	Portage, Waushara, & western Waupaca	Joseph H. Woodnorth	Waupaca	Dem.
22	Outagamie & eastern Waupaca	William Kennedy	Appleton	Dem.
23	Jefferson & western Waukesha	Albert Solliday	Watertown	Dem.
24	Walworth & eastern Rock	Thompson Weeks	Whitewater	Rep.
25	Clark & Eau Claire	Robert MacBride	Neillsville	Dem.
26	Dane (Most)	Robert M. Bashford	Madison	Dem.
27	Sauk & western Columbia	Russell C. Falconer	Portage	Dem.
28	Iowa, Lafayette, & southern Grant	Calvert Spensley	Mineral Point	Rep.
29	Buffalo, Barron, Dunn, & Pepin	Robert Lees	Alma	Dem.
30	Chippewa, Oneida, Price, & Taylor	Levi F. Martin	Chippewa Falls	Dem.
31	Jackson, Monroe, & Vernon	Henry Conner	Viroqua	Dem.
32	La Crosse & Trempealeau	Levi Withee	La Crosse	Rep.
33	Ozaukee, Washington, & northeast Dodge	Frederick W. Horn (died Jan. 15, 1893)	Cedarburg	Dem.
33	Ozaukee, Washington, & northeast Dodge	--Vacant--		

=== Members of the Assembly ===
Members of the Assembly for the Forty-First Wisconsin Legislature:

Assembly partisan composition Democratic: 56 seats Republican: 44 seats

Milwaukee County districts

Senate District	County	Dist.	Representative	Party	Residence
09	Adams & Marquette		Clarence V. Peirce	Rep.	Shields
11	Ashland		Michael McGeehan	Dem.	Hurley
29	Barron		Sewell A. Peterson	Rep.	Rice Lake
11	Bayfield, Burnett, Sawyer, & Washburn		William O'Neil	Rep.	Washburn
02	Brown	1	Henry F. Hagemeister	Dem.	Green Bay
02	Brown	2	Anton Van Der Heiden	Dem.	Wrightstown
29	Buffalo & Pepin		Duncan McKenzie	Rep.	Alma
15	Calumet		James W. Parkinson	Dem.	Brothertown
30	Chippewa	1	John C. Harmon	Dem.	Chippewa Falls
30	Chippewa	2	Henry Lebeis	Dem.	Bloomer
25	Clark		Baldwin W. Fullmer	Rep.	Loyal
27	Columbia	1	Hugh P. Jamieson	Dem.	Poynette
13	Columbia	2	Robert N. McConochie	Rep.	Cambria
16	Crawford		James O. Davidson	Rep.	Soldiers Grove
26	Dane	1	Charles W. Heyl	Dem.	Madison
26	Dane	2	Isaac Brader	Dem.	Waunakee
17	Dane	3	Nels Holman	Rep.	Deerfield
26	Dane	4	Niels C. Evans	Dem.	Mount Horeb
33	Dodge	1	Bennett E. Sampson	Dem.	LeRoy
13	Dodge	2	Michael E. Burke	Dem.	Beaver Dam
13	Dodge	3	William S. Schwefel	Dem.	Lebanon
01	Door		James Keogh	Rep.	Sturgeon Bay
11	Douglas		Edgar G. Mills	Rep.	Superior
29	Dunn		Albert R. Hall	Rep.	Knapp
25	Eau Claire	1	Frank McDonough	Rep.	Eau Claire
25	Eau Claire	2	Charles F. Hanke	Rep.	Augusta
18	Fond du Lac	1	Lyman W. Thayer	Rep.	Ripon
18	Fond du Lac	2	Louie A. Lange	Dem.	Fond du Lac
18	Fond du Lac	3	John M. Stack	Dem.	Forest
16	Grant	1	John Longbotham	Rep.	Paris
28	Grant	2	Joseph B. Johnson	Rep.	Montfort
17	Green		Henry Putnam	Rep.	Brodhead
09	Green Lake		Orrin W. Bowe	Dem.	Kingston
28	Iowa		John M. Smith	Dem.	Mineral Point
31	Jackson		James J. McGillivray	Rep.	Black River Falls
23	Jefferson	1	C. Hugo Jacobi	Dem.	Watertown
23	Jefferson	2	Christopher Grimm	Dem.	Jefferson
09	Juneau		W. Peter Wheelihan	Dem.	Necedah
03	Kenosha		Daniel A. Mahoney (died Jan. 27, 1893)	Dem.	Kenosha
03	Kenosha		George H. Kroncke (from Feb. 21, 1893)	Dem.	Randall
01	Kewaunee		Joseph Filz	Dem.	Luxemburg
32	La Crosse	1	Alfred A. Leissring	Dem.	La Crosse
32	La Crosse	2	Lemuel B. Cox	Rep.	Farmington
28	Lafayette		Jacob J. Iverson	Rep.	South Wayne
14	Florence, Forest, & Langlade		Francis A. Deleglise	Rep.	Antigo
14	Lincoln		David Finn	Dem.	Merrill
15	Manitowoc	1	Patrick J. Conway	Dem.	Meeme
15	Manitowoc	2	William Croll	Dem.	Manitowoc
12	Marathon	1	Albert B. Barney	Dem.	Spencer
12	Marathon	2	John Ringle	Dem.	Wausau
01	Marinette		Charles C. Daily	Dem.	Marinette
04	Milwaukee	1	Edward Keogh	Dem.	Milwaukee
04	Milwaukee	2	Charles F. A. Hintze	Dem.	Milwaukee
04	Milwaukee	3	Gustav Jeske	Rep.	Milwaukee
05	Milwaukee	4	William H. Austin	Rep.	Milwaukee
07	Milwaukee	5	Rip Reukema	Rep.	Milwaukee
06	Milwaukee	6	Philip Schmitz	Dem.	Milwaukee
06	Milwaukee	7	George A. Abert	Dem.	Milwaukee
05	Milwaukee	8	Joseph Deuster	Dem.	Milwaukee
05	Milwaukee	9	Charles Milbrath	Rep.	Milwaukee
08	Milwaukee	10	Theodore Prochnow (until Feb. 16, 1893)	Rep.	Milwaukee
08	Milwaukee	10	Peter Rademacher (from Feb. 16, 1893)	Dem.	Milwaukee
06	Milwaukee	11	Frank Suelflow	Rep.	Milwaukee
08	Milwaukee	12	Michael F. Blenski	Dem.	Milwaukee
08	Milwaukee	13	Charles Lenck	Rep.	Milwaukee
07	Milwaukee	14	Emerson D. Hoyt	Rep.	Wauwatosa
31	Monroe		Charles Quigg	Dem.	Tomah
02	Oconto		Edward A. Edmonds	Dem.	Oconto Falls
22	Outagamie	1	John Tracy	Dem.	Appleton
22	Outagamie	2	John Brill	Dem.	Kaukauna
30	Oneida, Price, & Taylor		Albert J. Perkins	Rep.	Medford
33	Ozaukee		William H. Fitzgerald	Dem.	Cedarburg
10	Pierce		Bryan H. Corcoran	Rep.	Oak Grove
10	Polk		Henry P. Burdick	Rep.	Osceola
21	Portage		Charles Couch	Dem.	Amherst
03	Racine	1	Peter Nelson	Rep.	Racine
03	Racine	2	Francis Reuschlein	Dem.	Burlington
16	Richland		Jay G. Lamberson	Rep.	Buena Vista
17	Rock	1	Benjamin W. Hubbard	Rep.	Evansville
24	Rock	2	Paul M. Green	Rep.	Milton
24	Rock	3	Agesilaus Wilson	Dem.	Janesville
27	Sauk	1	Charles Hirschinger	Rep.	Baraboo
27	Sauk	2	Henry C. Hunt	Dem.	Reedsburg
14	Shawano		Henry A. Brauer	Dem.	Shawano
20	Sheboygan	1	Theodore Dieckmann	Dem.	Sheboygan
20	Sheboygan	2	John Dassow	Dem.	Sheboygan Falls
20	Sheboygan	3	John W. Liebenstein	Dem.	Scott
10	St. Croix		Orrin J. Williams	Rep.	New Richmond
32	Trempealeau		David L. Holcomb	Rep.	Arcadia
31	Vernon		Daniel O. Mahoney	Rep.	Viroqua
24	Walworth	1	Frank L. Fraser	Rep.	East Troy
24	Walworth	2	William A. Cochrane	Rep.	Delavan
33	Washington		August Konrad	Dem	Hartford
07	Waukesha	1	John Schmidt	Dem.	Muskego
23	Waukesha	2	Benjamin F. Goss	Dem.	Pewaukee
22	Waupaca	1	David Jennings	Dem.	Mukwa
21	Waupaca	2	Jacob Wipf	Rep.	Iola
21	Waushara		Cornelius A. Davenport	Rep.	Aurora
19	Winnebago	1	Gustav S. Luscher	Dem.	Oshkosh
19	Winnebago	2	George Danielson	Dem.	Neenah
19	Winnebago	3	Frank T. Tucker	Rep.	Omro
12	Wood		John A. Gaynor	Dem.	Grand Rapids

== Committees ==
=== Senate committees ===
- Senate Committee on Agriculture – Adam Apple, chair
- Senate Committee on Assessment and Collection of Taxes – Samuel Smead, chair
- Senate Committee on Education – Russel C. Falconer, chair
- Senate Committee on Enrolled Bills – William F. Voss, chair
- Senate Committee on Engrossed Bills – Dayne Wescott, chair
- Senate Committee on Federal Relations – Oscar Altpeter, chair
- Senate Committee on Finance, Banks, and Insurance – Ferdinand Yahr, chair
- Senate Committee on Incorporations – Robert J. MacBride, chair
- Senate Committee on the Judiciary – William Kennedy, chair
- Senate Committee on Legislative Expenditures – Robert McGeehan, chair
- Senate Committee on Manufacturing and Commerce – Christian Koenitzer, chair
- Senate Committee on Military Affairs – Albert Solliday, chair
- Senate Committee on Privileges and Elections – J. W. Murphy, chair
- Senate Committee on Public Lands – Henry Conner, chair
- Senate Committee on Railroads – G. W. Pratt, chair
- Senate Committee on Roads and Bridges – John Fetzer, chair
- Senate Committee on State Affairs – Robert Lees, chair
- Senate Committee on Town and County Organizations – John T. Kingston, chair

=== Assembly committees ===
- Assembly Committee on Agriculture – William Schwefel, chair
- Assembly Committee on Assessment and Collection of Taxes – J. W. Parkinson, chair
- Assembly Committee on Bills on their Third Reading – D. Jennings, chair
- Assembly Committee on Cities – Peter J. Rademacher, chair
- Assembly Committee on Education – A. O. Wilson, chair
- Assembly Committee on Engrossed Bills – H. C. Hunt, chair
- Assembly Committee on Enrolled Bills – J. Deuster, chair
- Assembly Committee on Federal Relations – J. W. Liebenstein, chair
- Assembly Committee on Incorporations – H. F. Hagemeister, chair
- Assembly Committee on Insurance, Banks, and Banking – Gustave S. Luscher, chair
- Assembly Committee on the Judiciary – M. E. Burke, chair
- Assembly Committee on Labor and Manufactures – P. J. Conway, chair
- Assembly Committee on Legislative Expenditures – C. Hugo Jacobi, chair
- Assembly Committee on Lumber and Mining – W. Peter Wheelihan, chair
- Assembly Committee on Medical Societies – C. E. Quigg, chair
- Assembly Committee on Militia – George Abert, chair
- Assembly Committee on Privileges and Elections – J. Montgomery Smith, chair
- Assembly Committee on Public Improvements – Joseph Filz, chair
- Assembly Committee on Public Lands – John Schmidt, chair
- Assembly Committee on Railroads – B. E. Sampson, chair
- Assembly Committee on Roads and Bridges – Charles Couch, chair
- Assembly Committee on State Affairs – John Ringle, chair
- Assembly Committee on Town and County Organization – M. G. McGeehan, chair
- Assembly Committee on Ways and Means – A. Konrad, chair

=== Joint committees ===
- Joint Committee on Charitable and Penal Institutions – J. H. Woodnorth (Sen.) & John Tracy (Asm.), co-chairs
- Joint Committee on Claims – W. F. Nash (Sen.) & W. H. Fitzgerald (Asm.), co-chairs
- Joint Committee on Fish and Game – D. E. Wescott (Sen.) & C. W. Heyl (Asm.), co-chairs
- Joint Committee on Printing – M. Kruszka (Sen.) & L. A. Lange (Asm.), co-chairs
- Joint Committee on the World's Fair – J. H. Woodnorth (Sen.) & A. O. Wilson (Asm.), co-chairs

== Changes from the 40th Legislature ==
New districts for the 41st Legislature were defined in 1892 Wisconsin Special Session 2 Act 1, passed into law in the 40th Wisconsin Legislature.

=== Senate redistricting ===
==== Summary of changes ====
- Only 1 district was left unchanged (25).
- Fond du Lac County became its own district (18) after previously having been split between two districts.
- Milwaukee County went from having 4 districts to 4 (4, 5, 6, 8) plus one district shared with Waukesha County (7).
- Only three single-county districts remain (18, 19, 20).
- Seven counties are split between multi-county senate districts.

==== Senate districts ====
Dist.	40th Legislature	41st Legislature
1	Door, Marinette, Oconto counties	Door, Kewaunee, Marinette counties
2	Brown, Calumet counties	Brown, Oconto counties
3	Racine County	Kenosha, Racine counties
4	Milwaukee County (city north)	Milwaukee County (city northeast)
5	Milwaukee County (city center)	Milwaukee County (city south)
6	Milwaukee County (city south)	Milwaukee County (city center)
7	Milwaukee County (outside the city)	Northern Milwaukee and eastern Waukesha
8	Kenosha, Walworth counties	Milwaukee County (county south)
9	Green Lake, Portage, Waushara, western Marathon counties	Adams, Juneau, Marquette, Green Lake counties
10	Pierce, St. Croix counties	Pierce, Polk, St. Croix counties
11	Ashland, Florence, Forest, Langlade, Lincoln, Price, Taylor counties	Ashland, Bayfield, Burnett, Douglas, Sawyer, Washburn counties
12	Green, Lafayette counties	Marathon, Wood counties
13	Dodge County	Eastern Columbia, southern Dodge
14	Juneau, Sauk counties	Florence, Forest, Langlade, Lincoln, Shawano counties
15	Kewaunee, Manitowoc counties	Calumet, Manitowoc counties
16	Crawford, Grant counties	Crawford, Richland, northern Grant counties
17	Rock County	Green, southeast Dane, western Rock counties
18	Western Fond du Lac County	Fond du Lac County
19	Winnebago County (except Menasha)	Winnebago County
20	Sheboygan, Eastern Fond du Lac counties	Sheboygan County
21	Shawano, Waupaca, eastern Marathon counties	Portage, Waushara, western Waupaca counties
22	Outagamie County (and Menasha)	Outagamie, eastern Waupaca counties
23	Jefferson, western Waukesha counties	Jefferson, western Waukesha counties
24	Barron, Bayfield, Burnett, Douglas, Polk, Sawyer, Washburn counties	Walworth, eastern Rock counties
25	Clark, Eau Claire counties	Clark, Eau Claire counties
26	Dane County	Most of Dane County
27	Adams, Columbia, Marquette counties	Sauk, western Columbia counties
28	Iowa, Richland counties	Iowa, Lafayette, southern Grant counties
29	Buffalo, Pepin, Trempealeau counties	Buffalo, Barron, Dunn, Pepin counties
30	Chippewa, Dunn counties	Chippewa, Oneida, Price, Taylor counties
31	La Crosse, Vernon counties	Jackson, Monroe, Vernon counties
32	Jackson, Monroe, Wood counties	La Crosse, Trempealeau counties
33	Ozaukee, Washington, eastern Waukesha counties	Ozaukee, Washington, northern Dodge counties

=== Assembly redistricting ===
==== Summary of changes ====
- 25 districts were left unchanged.
- Ashland County became its own district after previously having been in a shared district with Florence, Forest, Oneida, and Price counties.
- Buffalo and Pepin were combined into a shared district after previously having each been separate districts.
- Douglas County became its own district after previously having been in a shared district with Bayfield, Burnett, Sawyer, and Washburn counties.
- Grant County went from having 2 districts to 1.
- Iowa County went from having 2 districts to 1.
- Lincoln County became its own district after previously having been in a shared district with Langlade and Taylor.
- Milwaukee County went from having 12 districts to 14.
- Monroe County went from having 2 districts to 1.
- Racine County went from having 1 district to 2.
- Vernon County went from having 2 districts to 1.

==== Assembly districts ====
County	Districts in 40th Legislature	Districts in 41st Legislature	Change
Adams	Shared with Marquette	Shared with Marquette	Steady
Ashland	Shared with Florence, Forest, Oneida, & Price	1 District	▲
Barron	1 District	1 District	Steady
Bayfield	Shared with Burnett, Douglas, Sawyer, & Washburn	Shared with Burnett, Sawyer, & Washburn	Steady
Brown	2 Districts	2 Districts	Steady
Buffalo	1 District	Shared with Pepin	▼
Burnett	Shared with Bayfield, Douglas, Sawyer, & Washburn	Shared with Bayfield, Sawyer, & Washburn	Steady
Calumet	1 District	1 District	Steady
Chippewa	1 District	2 Districts	▲
Clark	1 District	1 District	Steady
Columbia	2 Districts	2 Districts	Steady
Crawford	1 District	1 District	Steady
Dane	4 Districts	4 Districts	Steady
Dodge	3 Districts	3 Districts	Steady
Door	1 District	1 District	Steady
Douglas	Shared with Bayfield, Burnett, Sawyer, & Washburn	1 District	▲
Dunn	1 District	1 District	Steady
Eau Claire	2 Districts	2 Districts	Steady
Florence	Shared with Ashland, Forest, Oneida, & Price	Shared with Forest & Langlade	Steady
Fond du Lac	3 Districts	3 Districts	Steady
Forest	Shared with Ashland, Florence, Oneida, & Price	Shared with Florence & Langlade	Steady
Grant	3 Districts	2 Districts	▼
Green	1 District and 1 shared with Lafayette	1 District	▼
Green Lake	1 District	1 District	Steady
Iowa	2 Districts	1 District	▼
Jackson	1 District	1 District	Steady
Jefferson	2 Districts	2 Districts	Steady
Juneau	1 District	1 District	Steady
Kenosha	1 District	1 District	Steady
Kewaunee	1 District	1 District	Steady
La Crosse	2 Districts	2 Districts	Steady
Lafayette	1 District and 1 shared with Green	1 District	▼
Langlade	Shared with Lincoln & Taylor	Shared with Florence & Forest	Steady
Lincoln	Shared with Langlade & Taylor	1 District	▲
Manitowoc	2 Districts and 1 shared with Kewaunee	2 Districts	▼
Marathon	2 Districts	2 Districts	Steady
Marinette	1 District	1 District	Steady
Marquette	Shared with Adams	Shared with Adams	Steady
Milwaukee	12 Districts	14 Districts	▲▲
Monroe	2 Districts	1 District	▼
Oconto	1 District	1 District	Steady
Outagamie	2 Districts	2 Districts	Steady
Ozaukee	1 District	1 District	Steady
Pepin	1 District	Shared with Buffalo	▼
Pierce	1 District	1 District	Steady
Polk	1 District	1 District	Steady
Portage	1 District	1 District	Steady
Price	Shared with Ashland, Florence, Forest, & Oneida	Shared with Oneida & Taylor	Steady
Racine	1 District	2 Districts	▲
Richland	1 District	1 District	Steady
Rock	3 Districts	3 Districts	Steady
Sauk	2 Districts	2 Districts	Steady
Sawyer	Shared with Bayfield, Burnett, Douglas, & Washburn	Shared with Bayfield, Burnett, & Washburn	Steady
Shawano	1 District and 1 shared with Waupaca	1 District	▼
Sheboygan	3 Districts	3 Districts	Steady
St. Croix	1 District	1 District	Steady
Taylor	Shared with Langlade & Lincoln	Shared with Oneida & Price	Steady
Trempealeau	1 District	1 District	Steady
Vernon	2 Districts	1 District	▼
Walworth	2 Districts	2 Districts	Steady
Washburn	Shared with Bayfield, Burnett, Douglas, & Sawyer	Shared with Bayfield, Burnett, & Sawyer	Steady
Washington	1 District	1 District	Steady
Waukesha	2 Districts	2 Districts	Steady
Waupaca	1 District and 1 shared with Shawano	2 Districts	▲
Waushara	1 District	1 District	Steady
Winnebago	3 Districts	3 Districts	Steady
Wood	1 District	1 District	Steady

== Employees ==
=== Senate employees ===
- Chief Clerk: Sam J. Shafer
  - Assistant Chief Clerk: Franklin Bowen
  - Journal Clerk: Jackson Silbaugh
  - Bookkeeper: Edward Malone
    - Assistant Bookkepper: P. T. Diamond
  - Engrossing Clerk: Will N. Wells
    - Assistant Engrossing Clerk: Thomas O'Hara
  - Enrolling Clerk: John G. Faulds
    - Assistant Enrolling Clerk: Hames McBrien
  - Proofreader: Anton Boex
  - Index Clerk: Jessie Knowles
    - Assistant Index Clerk: May Armstrong
  - Clerk for the Judiciary Committee: William F. Collins
  - Clerk for the Committee on Incorporations: Robert J. MacBride Jr.
  - Clerk for the Committee on Claims: W. H. Wieboldt
  - Clerk for the Committee on Town and County Organization: Bert Williams
  - Clerk for the Committee on Charitable and Penal Institutions: B. A. Weatherby
  - Clerk for the Committee on Railroads: R. B. Pratt
  - Clerk for the Committee on Engrossed Bills: Minnie LeClaire
  - Clerk for the Committee on Enrolled Bills: Fred Smith
  - Document Clerk: Frank W. Teske
  - Comparing Clerks:
    - Nellie Gates
    - Lizzie Jahnke
    - C. T. Bundy
    - A. P. Deignan
  - General Clerks:
    - J. T. Sims
    - E. R. Petherick
    - O. F. Huhn
    - Clifford P. Best
    - Joseph Mashek
  - Ruling Clerk: Anna Hurley
  - Printing Page: Noel Nash
- Sergeant-at-Arms: J. R. Becker
  - Assistant Sergeant-at-Arms: K. Owocki
- Postmaster: Michael W. Ryan
  - Assistant Postmaster: A. Wagener
- Gallery Attendants: N. Biever
- General Attendants:
  - J. O'Rourk
  - J. W. Reed
- Document Room Attendant: Carl Schneider
- Committee Room Attendants:
  - Thomas Kennedy
  - R. Huyck
  - J. J. Jacobs
  - Carl Felker
- Doorkeepers:
  - R. Tuttle
  - S. Sherwood
  - S. C. Baas
  - R. Carey
- Night Watch: John Arendt
- Janitor: R. M. Burk
- Custodian of the Enrolling Room: J. M. Frey
- Custodian of the Engrossing Room: George Malone
- Night Laborer: John D. Fay
- Messengers:
  - R. E. Taylor
  - M. Norris
  - Charles Seller
  - John Hayes
  - Bert Levy
  - Don Frank
  - M. Baumgartner
  - B. Husting
  - H. Tierney
  - A. Cavenaugh
  - J. A. Adamson
  - Bernie Erickson

=== Assembly employees ===
- Chief Clerk: G. W. Porth
  - Assistant Chief Clerk: E. D. Doney
  - Journal Clerk: John E. Wright
    - Assistant Journal Clerk: Louis K. Wright
  - Bookkeeper: William Mayworm
    - Assistant Bookkeeper: Joseph D. O'Brien
  - Engrossing Clerk: S. D. Goodell
    - Assistant Engrossing Clerk: Tom Overland
  - Enrolling Clerk: A. Goerz
    - Assistant Enrolling Clerk: J. J. Gleason
  - Index Clerk: Charles A. Leicht
    - Assistant Index Clerk: Willard Temple
  - Stationary Clerk: Elmer Skelly
  - Proof Reader: F. A. Bartlett
  - Copy Holder: Bessie Lusk
  - Ruling Clerk: W. J. Taylor
  - Comparing Clerk: Charles Reuschlein
  - General Clerks:
    - James Carroll
    - C. B. Goodwin
    - George Silbernagel
    - Ed Conway Jr.
  - Clerk for the Judiciary Committee: F. M. Shaughnessy
    - Stenographer for the Judiciary Committee: Hattie Pier
  - Clerk for the Committee on Enrolled Bills: Thomas McBean
  - Clerk for the Committee on Engrossed Bills: C. W. Hunt
  - Clerk for the Committee on Incorporations: Pat Ryan
  - Clerk for the Committee on State Affairs: William Ringle
  - Clerk for the Committee on Railroads: Ella Graham
  - Clerk for the Committee on Privileges and Elections: A. S. White
  - Clerk for the Committee on Insurance, Banks, and Banking: George Coughran
  - Clerk for the Committee on Town and County Organization: W. P. Hyland
  - Clerk for the Committee on Bills on Third Reading: E. L. Hardy
  - Document Clerk: J. A. Venus
- Sergeant-at-Arms: Theodore Knapstein
  - Assistant Sergeant-at-Arms: John H. Rooney
- Postmaster: William McMullen
  - Assistant Postmaster: G. T. McElroy
- Doorkeepers:
  - S. Hanizeski
  - Ole Neilson
  - Casper Lebeis
  - T. E. Chubbuck
- General Attendant: Albert Stoppenbach
- Document Room Attendant: Ulrich Wettstein
- Gallery Attendants:
  - August C. Mann
  - F. Herman
- Committee Room Attendants:
  - L. J. Evans
  - George Nebel
  - John F. Harnes
  - D. C. Clune
  - Valentine Klesges
  - Joseph E. Grassberger
  - Robert Plisch
  - A. D. Kildowe
  - T. A. Blackwell
- Porter: John Pinzger
- Flagman: Byron Moore
- Night Watch: Fred Bishop
- Custodian of the Enrolling Room: George Sherer
- Custodian of the Engrossing Room: C. J. Courtenan
- Committee Room Custodians:
  - Joseph Hortel
  - William Croll
- Wash Room Attendant: Jacob Beth
- Cloak Room Attendants:
  - John O'Keefe
  - Peter Spehn
- Janitor: William Fahringer
- Messengers:
  - James Whitty
  - John Conway
  - Frank Sims
  - Frank Shealy
  - Eddie Ballschmider
  - Arthur Gardener
  - Bennie Dodge
  - Thomas Burke
  - Archie McCoy
  - S. Andrzejewski
  - Louis Corey
  - Everett Monshan
