= Aviation Heritage Center of Wisconsin =

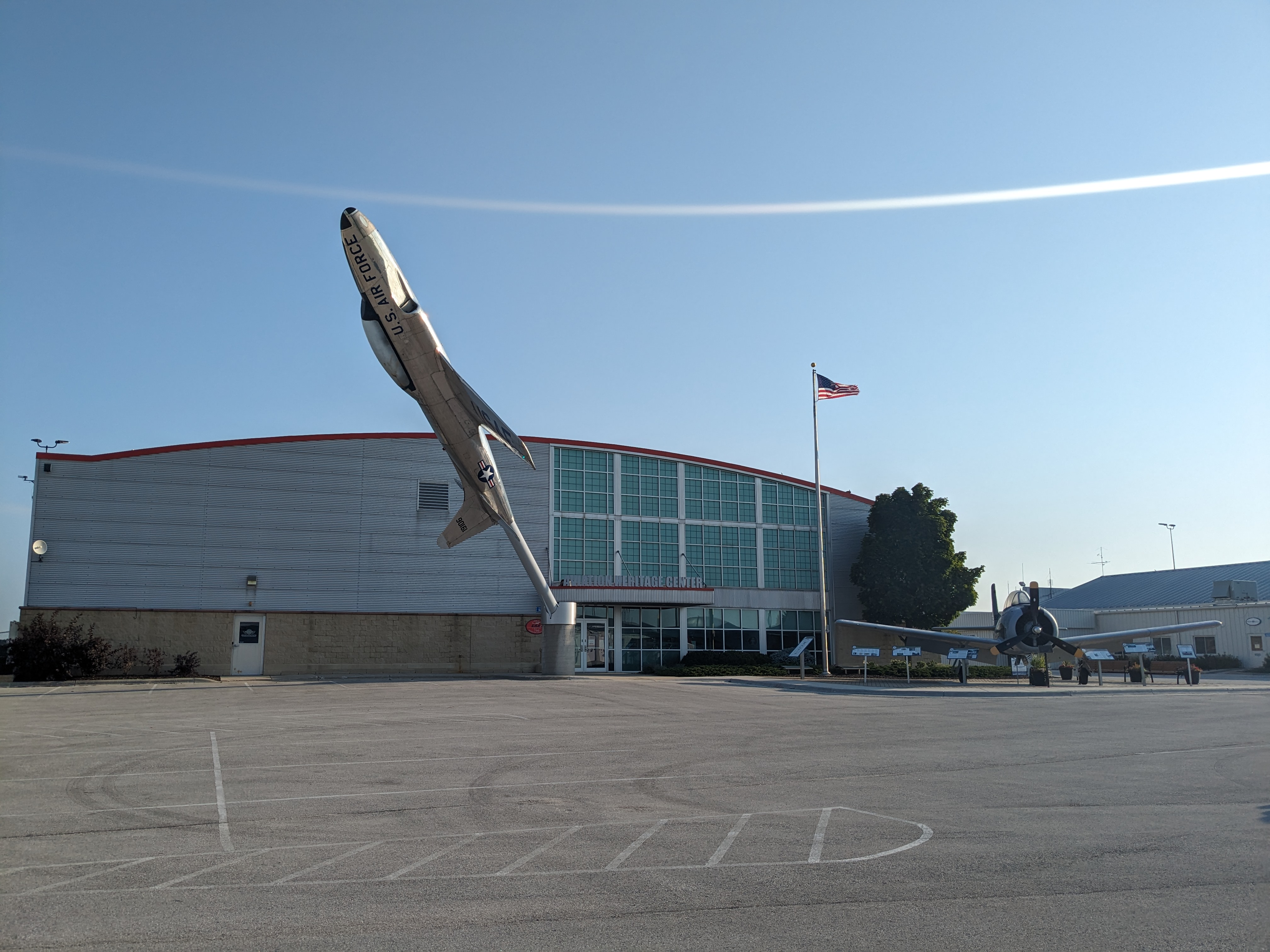
- The front of the AHCW in 2023

- Location within Wisconsin
- Established: 2005
- Location: Sheboygan Falls, Wisconsin
- Coordinates: 43.7643°N 87.8514°W
- Type: Aviation museum
- Website: www.ahcw.org

The Aviation Heritage Center of Wisconsin is an aviation museum located at Sheboygan County Memorial Airport in Sheboygan Falls, Wisconsin focused on aviation history in Wisconsin.

== History ==
=== Background ===
The Sheboygan County Aviation Corporation was established in 1998 by a group from EAA Chapter 766. In March 2003, it signed a 50-year lease for a plot of land at the Sheboygan County Memorial Airport and announced plans for a "Gateway to Aviation" project to build an Aviation Welcome Center & Education Facility the following year.

=== Establishment ===
The museum held a ribbon cutting on 18 June 2005 when construction on the 11,677 sq ft (1,084.8 m^{2}) building was completed. However, it took another year for the exhibits to be installed before a grand opening occurred on 28 October 2006.

Following the start of a fundraising drive the year before, the museum dedicated an exhibit to Hmong pilots in September 2014.

The museum hosted an airshow for the first time in July 2016.

The museum purchased a former North Central Airlines DC-3 in 2017.

== Facilities ==
The museum is made up of an exhibition hall, education learning lab, library, hangar and observation areas. It also includes the Kohler Conference Room, which is named for Walter J. Kohler Sr. and Walter J. Kohler Jr., former governors of Wisconsin who used aircraft in both their public and private lives.

== Exhibits ==
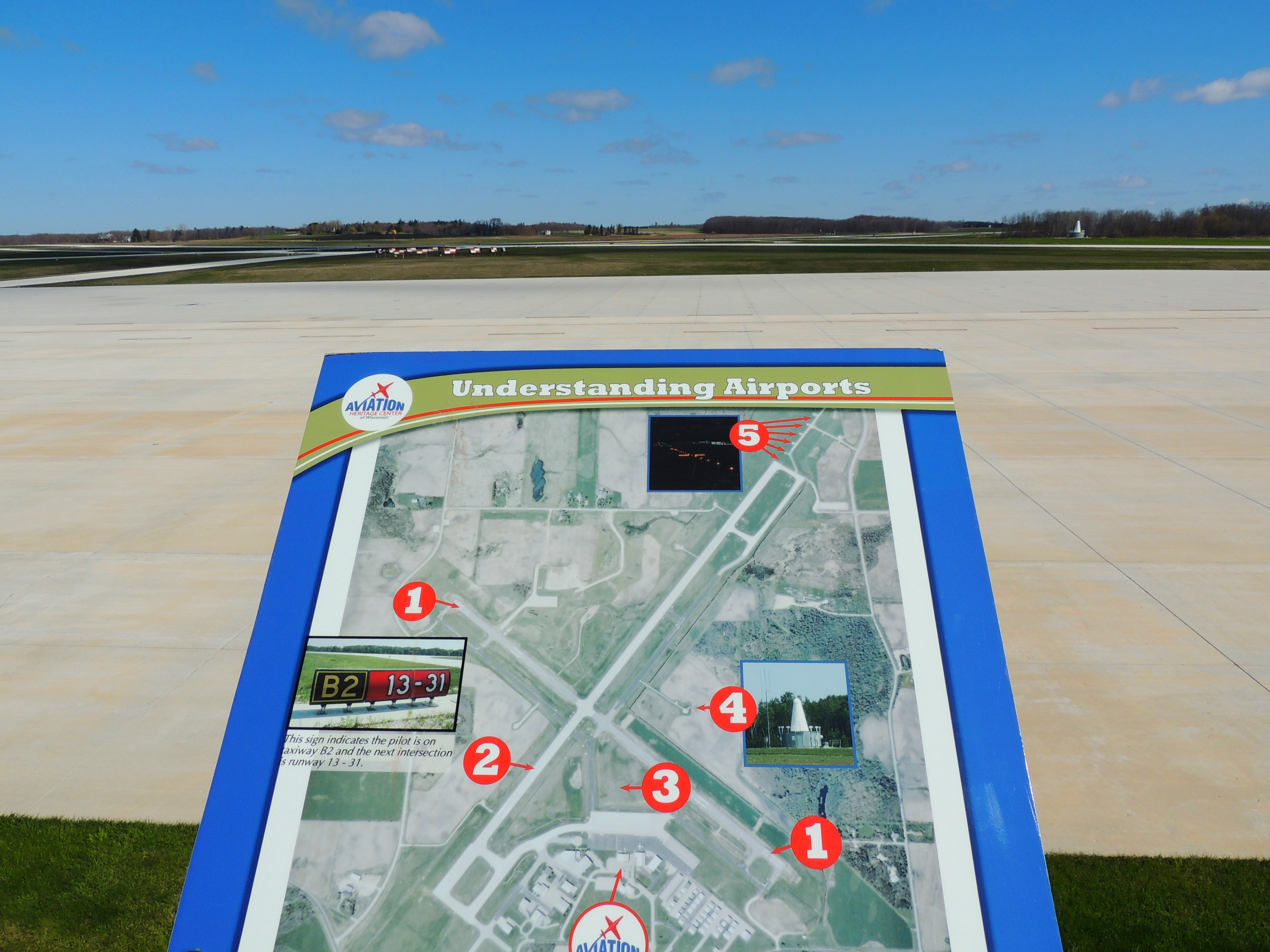
View of the airport from the museum's observation deck

Exhibits at the museum include Wisconsin pioneers of aviation, North Central Airlines, Hmong pilots in the Vietnam War. The museum also has a set of flight simulators.

== Collection ==
- Douglas DC-3
- Lockheed T-33A
- Monnett Moni
- North American T-28B Trojan

== Events ==
The museum hosts an annual T-28 air clinic. (Note: The clinic originally featured the Trojan Horsemen demonstration team until it disbanded in 2017.) A Wings and Wheels event sponsored by EAA Chapter 766 also takes place every Father's Day.
