= Senator Wescott =

Senator Wescott may refer to:

- Dayne Wescott (1850–1929), Wisconsin State Senate
- Samuel Wescott (fl. 1850s–1860s), New Jersey State Senate
- Walter S. Wescott (1828–1908), Wisconsin State Senate
