= Sheboygan Falls =

Sheboygan Falls may refer to:

- Sheboygan Falls, Wisconsin
- Sheboygan Falls (town), Wisconsin
