= Kroghville, Wisconsin =

- Unincorporated community
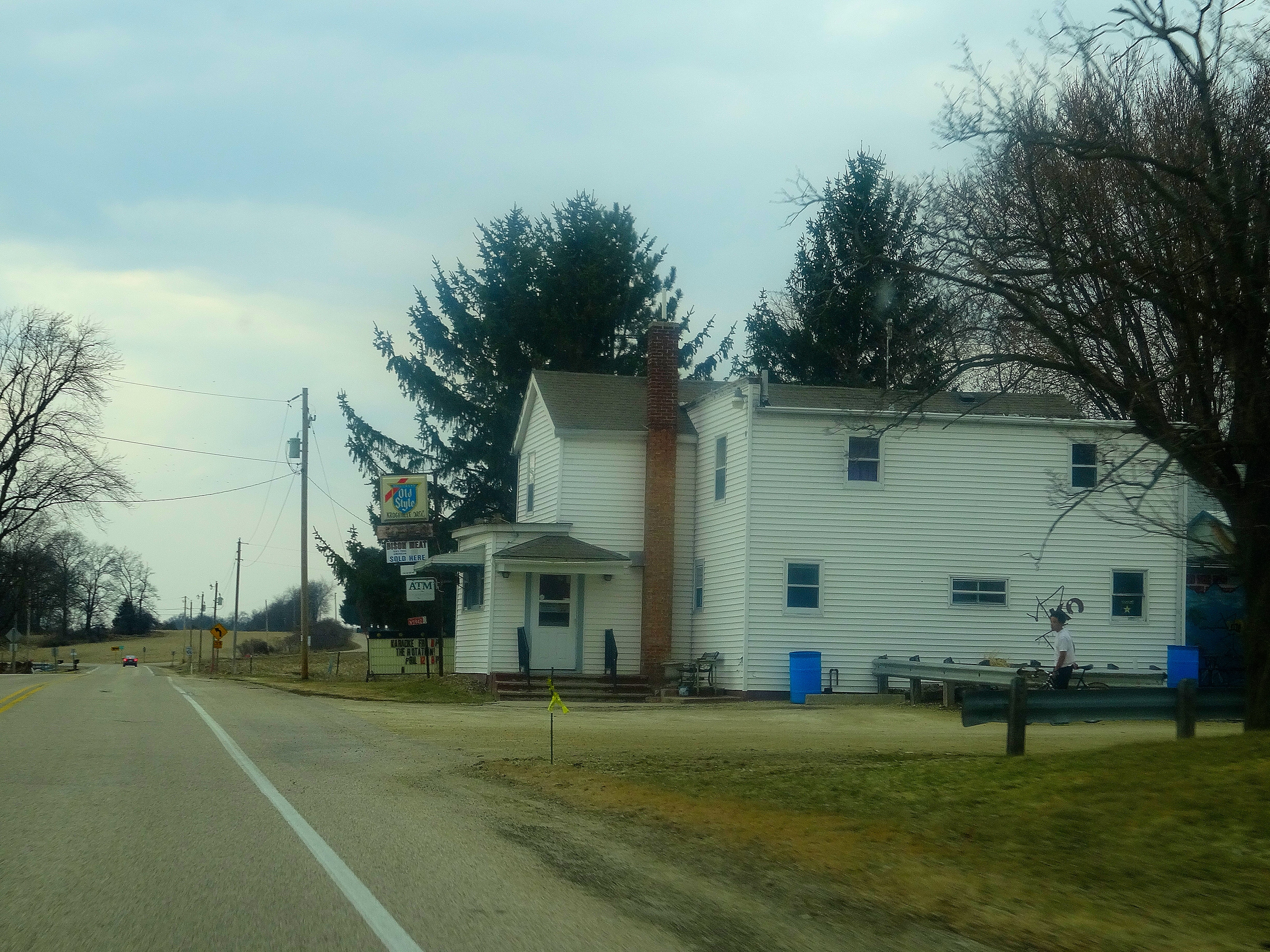

- Location within Wisconsin Location within the United States
- Coordinates: 43°03′42″N 89°00′29″W
- Country: United States
- State: Wisconsin
- County: Jefferson
- Town: Lake Mills
- Elevation: 856 ft (261 m)
- Time zone: UTC-6 (Central (CST))
  - Summer (DST): UTC-5 (CDT)
- Area code: 920
- GNIS feature ID: 1577685

Kroghville is an unincorporated community located in the town of Lake Mills, Jefferson County, Wisconsin, United States. Kroghville is located on County Highway O, 4 miles (6.4 km) north of Cambridge. The community is named for Casper Krogh, a Norwegian emigrant who opened a sawmill in the area in the 1840s.
