= Charles A. Laack =

American politician

Charles A. Laack (May 30, 1871 – July 6, 1957) was an American farmer, telephone company president, and politician.

Born in the town of Plymouth, Sheboygan County, Wisconsin, he, his wife, and family lived on a farm in the town of Sheboygan Falls. Laack was president of the Plank Road Telephone Company and president of the Farmers Call Board of Plymouth. Laack served as assessor for the town of Sheboygan Falls and as school district treasurer. From 1933 to 1939, Laack served in the Wisconsin State Assembly as a Democrat. Laack died at his son's house in the town of Sheboygan Falls after a long illness.
