= London, Wisconsin =

Unincorporated community in Wisconsin, US

- Unincorporated community
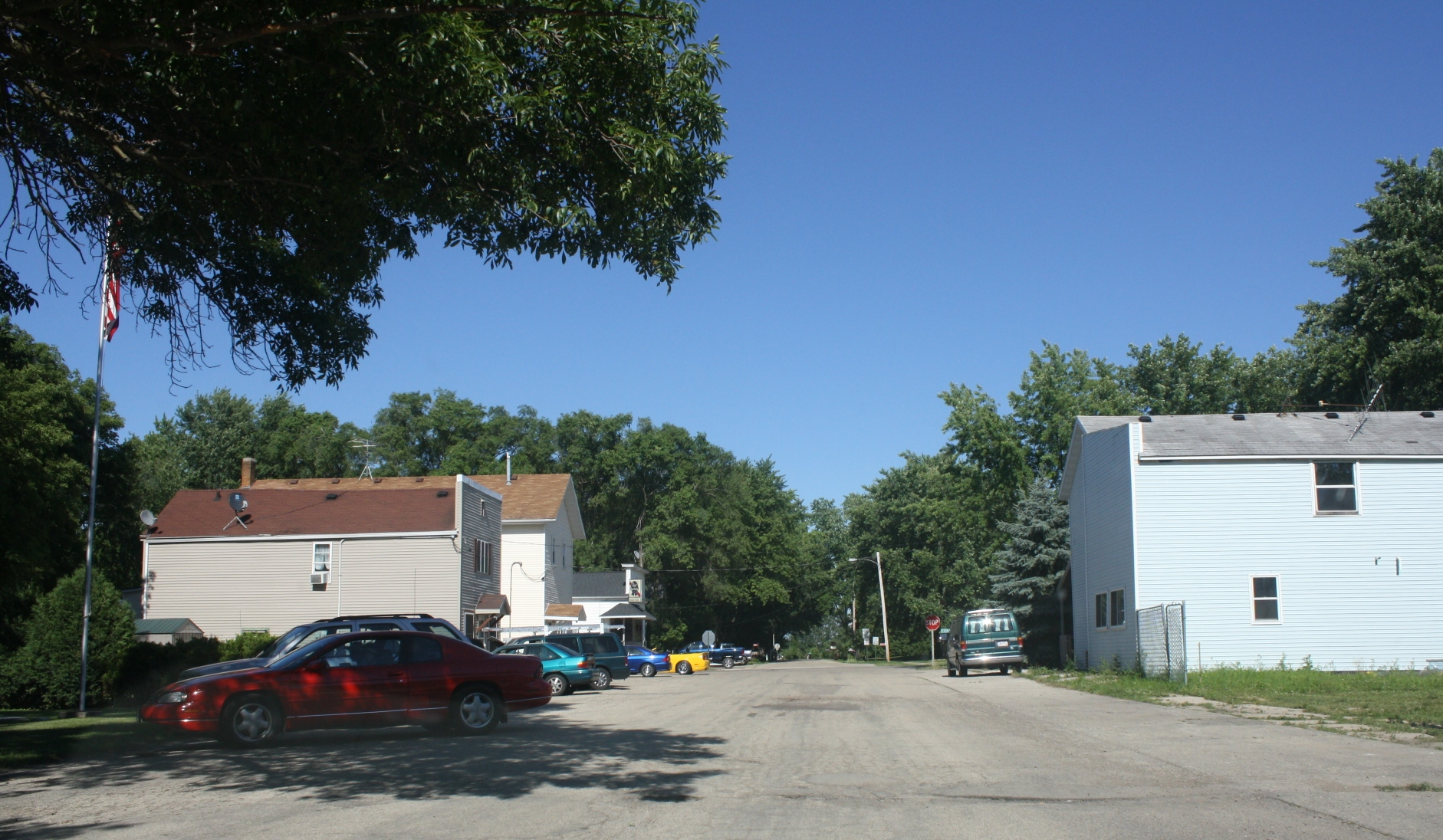
- Looking east in downtown London

- Location within Wisconsin Location within the United States
- Coordinates: 43°02′52″N 89°00′46″W
- Country: United States
- State: Wisconsin
- Counties: Dane and Jefferson
- Towns: Deerfield and Lake Mills
- Elevation: 873 ft (266 m)
- Time zone: UTC-6 (Central (CST))
  - Summer (DST): UTC-5 (CDT)
- Area code: 608
- GNIS feature ID: 1568505

London is an unincorporated community located in the counties of Dane and Jefferson in the U.S. state of Wisconsin. The Dane County portion of London is in the town of Deerfield, while the Jefferson County portion is in the town of Lake Mills. London is on Wisconsin Highway 134, 3 miles (4.8 km) north of Cambridge.

== History ==
A post office called London was established in 1882, and remained in operation until 1960. A large share of the early settlers being natives of London, England caused the name to be selected.

== Recreation ==
The Glacial Drumlin State Trail passes through London.

== Notable people ==
- Herman J. Severson, Wisconsin State Senator and jurist, was principal of a school in London.

== Images ==
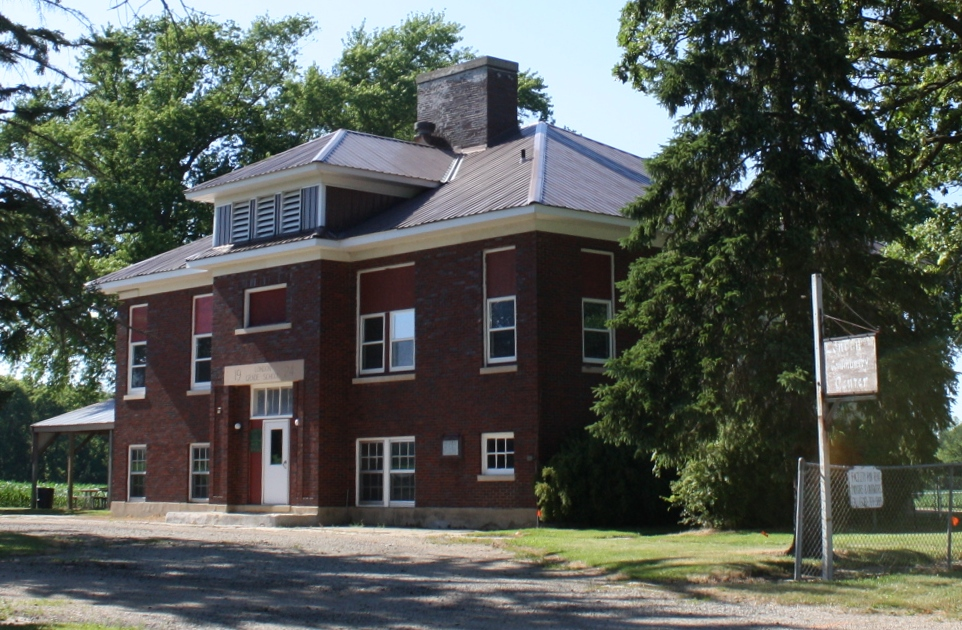
Community center

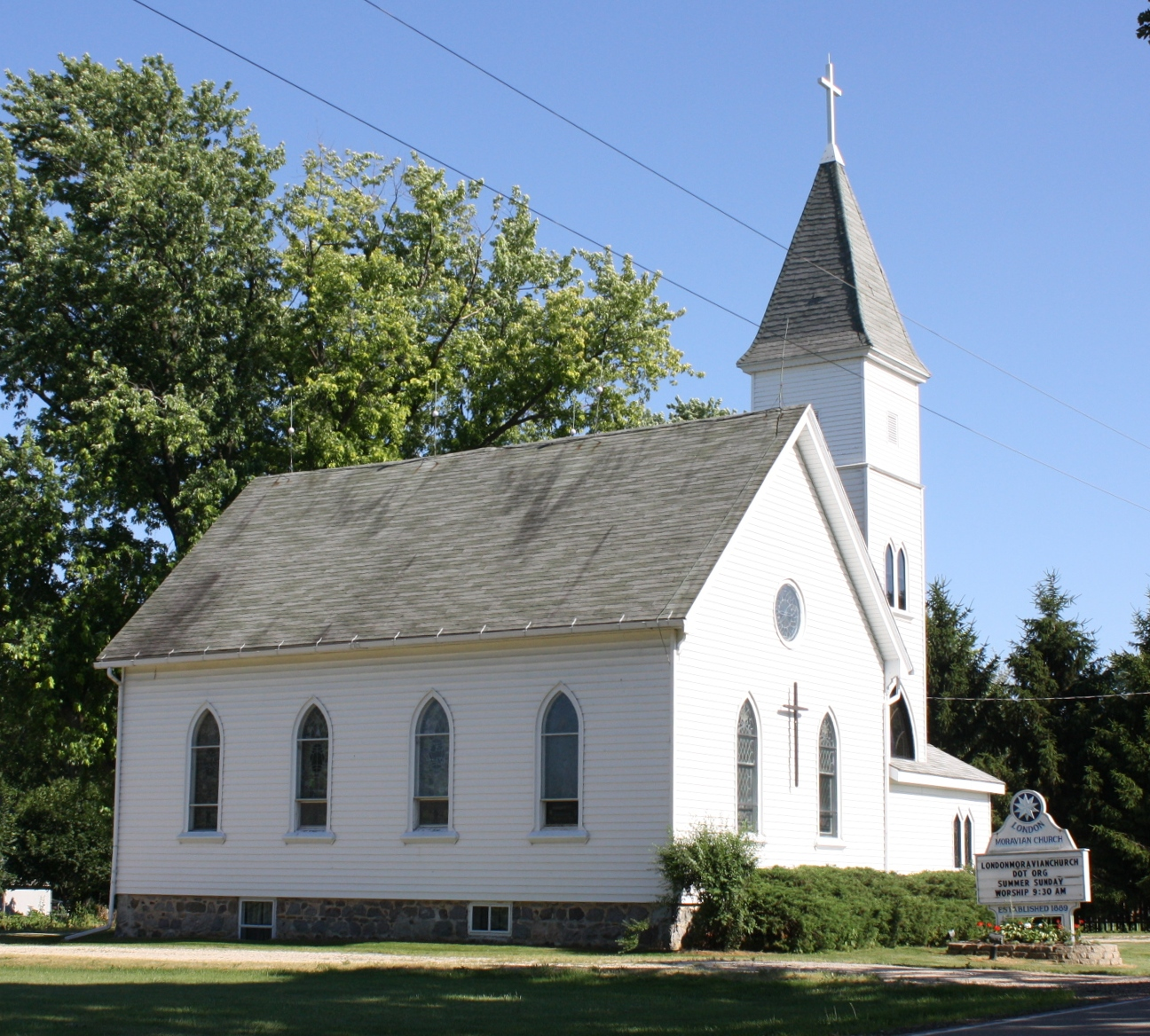
Moravian church
