= Baldwin W. Fullmer =

19th century American politician

Baldwin Fullmer

Member of the Wisconsin State Assembly from the Clark district
- In office January 2, 1893 – January 7, 1895
- Preceded by: Phillip Rossman
- Succeeded by: Joseph Marsh

Personal details
- Born: May 6, 1834 Bertie, Upper Canada
- Died: May 21, 1910 (aged 76) Webb Lake, Wisconsin, U.S.
- Resting place: Loyal City Cemetery, Loyal, Wisconsin
- Party: Republican

Military service
- Allegiance: United States
- Branch/service: United States Volunteers; Union Army
- Years of service: 1865
- Rank: Commissary Sergeant
- Unit: 49th Reg. Wis. Vol. Infantry
- Battles/wars: American Civil War

Baldwin W. Fullmer (May 6, 1834 – May 21, 1910) was a Canadian American immigrant, farmer, politician, newspaper editor, and Methodist minister. He was a member of the Wisconsin State Assembly, representing Clark County during the 1893 session.

== Biography ==
Fullmer was born in Bertie, Upper Canada. In 1845, Fullmer emigrated with his parents to the United States and settled in Illinois. In 1846, Fullmer and his parents moved to Dodge County, Wisconsin Territory. He went to the public schools He then went to Lawrence University and Baylin & Lincoln Commercial College in Milwaukee, Wisconsin. Fullmer joined the Methodist Conference and was ordained to the ministry. In 1876, Fullmer moved to Loyal, Clark County, Wisconsin. He was a farmer and taught school. Fullmer was also the editor of the Loyal Tribune newspaper. During the American Civil War, Fullmer served in the Union Army. He served as chairman of the Loyal Town Board and was a Republican. In 1893 and 1894, Fullmer served in the Wisconsin Assembly. In 1904, Fullmer moved to Webb Lake, Wisconsin. He died in Webb Lake, Wisconsin from diabetes.
