= James Keogh (Wisconsin politician) =

American politician

James Keogh Jr. (April 26, 1850 – January 23, 1896) was an American lawyer, banker and politician from Sturgeon Bay, Wisconsin. He held varied local offices, including mayor of Sturgeon Bay, and served one two-year term as a Republican member of the Wisconsin State Assembly for Door County in the 41st Wisconsin Legislature (1891–1893).

== Background ==
Keogh was born in Dublin, Ireland on April 26, 1850, son of James and Mary Keogh, and came with his parents to Canada in 1852, from there to Wisconsin in 1855, where the family settled in Forestville. He attended the common schools and the Oshkosh State Normal School, and became a lawyer and businessman. He moved to Sturgeon Bay in 1874.

== Business activity ==
As of 1893, he was president of the Frankfort Land Company and of the W. O. Brown Manufacturing Company, secretary of the Sturgeon Bay Dock Company, a director of the Ahnapee and Western Railroad, and cashier of the Bank of Sturgeon Bay.

== Public office ==
Keogh served as Door County's register of deeds from 1875 to 1889, as county school superintendent from 1878 to 1879, and served at various times as school director, alderman and president of the board of education, and when elected to the Assembly in 1892 was mayor of Sturgeon Bay. He was elected to the Assembly with 1653 votes to 1011 for Democrat Arnold Wagner and 38 for Populist Frank Wellener (the incumbent, Democrat Charles Mitchell Whiteside, was not a candidate). He was assigned to the standing committees on insurance and on banks and banking. He was not a candidate for re-election in 1894, and was succeeded by fellow Republican James Hanson.

== Death ==
Keogh died January 23, 1896, as the result of injuries sustained while rescuing family members from a fire in the family home on January 12. As of his death, he was city attorney and had spent several terms as mayor. He left a widow and seven children, most of whom had been injured in the fire (some severely).
