= Sheboygan County Memorial Airport =

Sheboygan County Memorial International Airport
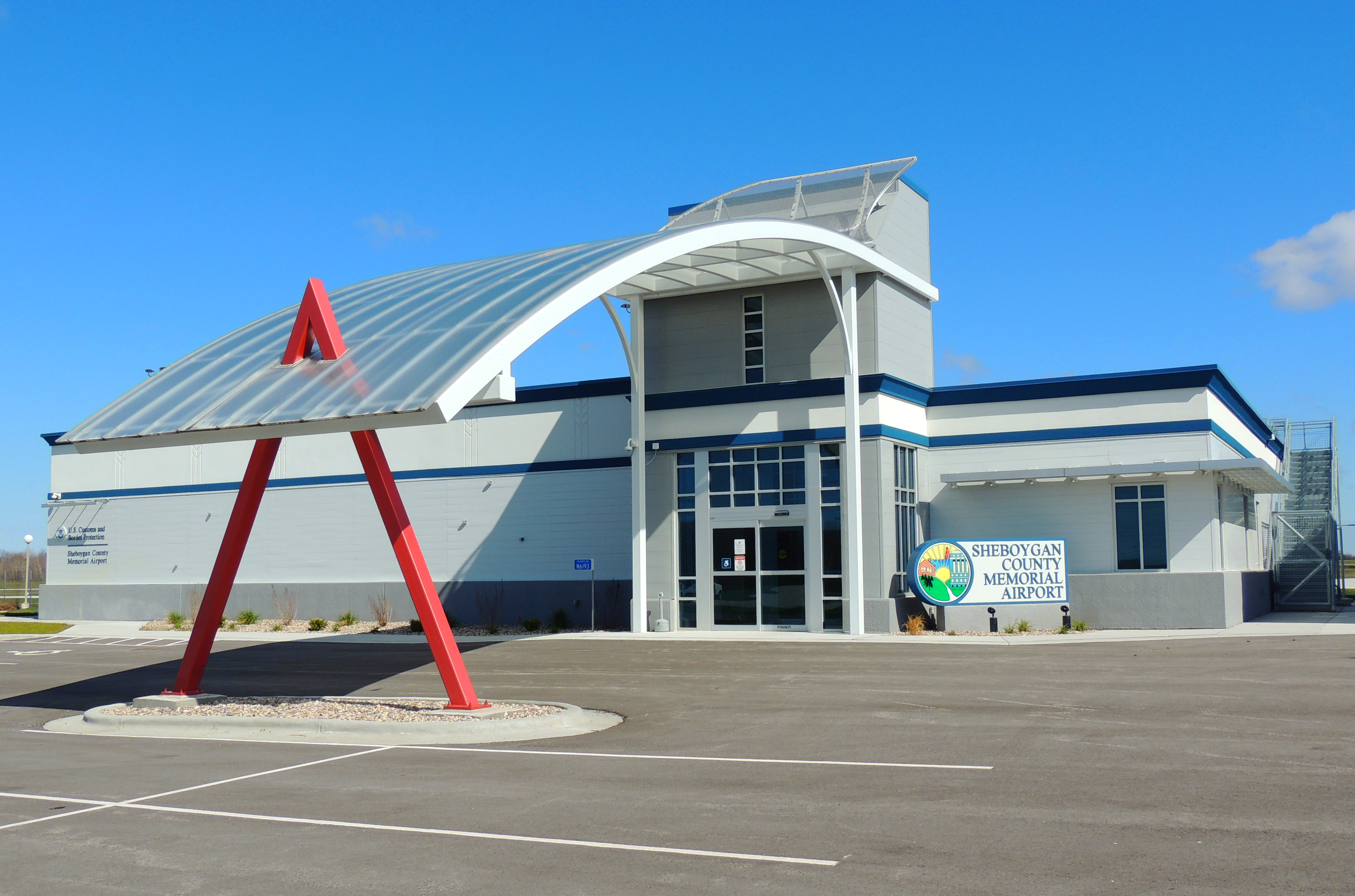
- U.S. Customs and Border Protection Terminal Facility at the Sheboygan County Airport in 2021
- IATA: SBM; ICAO: KSBM; FAA LID: SBM

Summary
- Airport type: Public
- Owner: Sheboygan County Transportation Department
- Operator: Lake Breeze Aviation
- Serves: Sheboygan, Wisconsin
- Location: Town of Sheboygan Falls, Wisconsin
- Opened: October 1946
- Time zone: CST (UTC−06:00)
  - Summer (DST): CDT (UTC−05:00)
- Elevation AMSL: 755 ft / 230 m
- Coordinates: 43°46′11″N 087°51′06″W
- Website: Official website

Map
- Location of airport in Wisconsin SBM (the United States)

Runways
Direction	Length		Surface
Direction	ft	m	Surface
4/22	6,800	2,073	Concrete
13/31	5,002	1,525	Asphalt

Statistics
- Aircraft operations (2024): 22,600
- Based aircraft (2025): 65
- Source: Federal Aviation Administration

Sheboygan County Memorial International Airport (IATA: SBM, ICAO: KSBM, FAA LID: SBM) is a county-owned public-use non-towered airport located in the Town of Sheboygan Falls, three nautical miles (6 km) northwest of the City of Sheboygan, in Sheboygan County, Wisconsin, United States. It is included in the Federal Aviation Administration (FAA) National Plan of Integrated Airport Systems for 2025–2029, in which it is categorized as a regional general aviation facility. Sheboygan's National Weather Service observation station is based at the airport.

== Overview ==
Sheboygan County Memorial International Airport mainly serves as a corporate aviation base for several county businesses, including Kohler Company, Bemis Manufacturing Company, Windway Capital, and NV5 Geospatial Solutions. The airport also serves as a major link to local attractions such as Road America and the county's golf courses, such as Blackwolf Run and Whistling Straits.

A U.S. Customs and Border Protection User Fee Facility (UFF) opened at the airport on April 12, 2021, enabling direct international arrivals. This facility, part of a $5 million project that also included a new general aviation terminal and administration offices, was developed to support major events like the 2021 Ryder Cup and to facilitate corporate aviation for local businesses. The facility enhances the airport’s role as a regional hub, eliminating the need for international travelers to clear customs at larger airports like Appleton or Green Bay, and supports local economic growth by attracting international business and tourism.

The Aviation Heritage Center of Wisconsin is located east of the U.S. Customs and FBO Terminal Facility.

== Facilities and Aircraft ==
Sheboygan County Memorial International Airport covers an area of 737 acres (298 ha) at an elevation of 755 feet (230 m) above mean sea level. It has two runways: the primary runway 4/22 is 6,800 by 100 feet (2,073 x 30 m) with a concrete surface and the crosswind runway 13/31 is 5,002 by 75 feet (1,525 x 23 m) with an asphalt surface.

The fixed-base operator (FBO) is Lake Breeze Aviation, which offers fuel (Jet-A and 100LL, with 24/7 self-serve 100LL), aircraft parking and hangar storage, towing, lavatory and potable water servicing, and de-icing, all supported by NATA Safety First trained and certified technicians. The FBO also offers aircrew and passenger basic amenities such as vending, crew car, and pilot's lounge. The airport is served by Uber, Lyft, local taxicabs and shuttle services, as well as DoorDash, Uber Eats, and local catering companies. Avis Car Rental and Enterprise Rent-A-Car, both having local presence, offer drop-off and pick-up service directly to the FBO.

Airworthy Aviation, based at the airport, offers aircraft maintenance, repair, and overhaul services, including annual inspections. As an authorized Cessna and Cirrus Service Center, it specializes in servicing these aircraft for general aviation, corporate, private, and charter operators.

For the 12-month period ending June 15, 2024, the airport had 22,600 aircraft operations, an average of 62 per day: 89% general aviation, 11% air taxi, and less than 1% military. As of August 2025, there were 65 aircraft based at this airport: 51 single-engine, 7 multi-engine, and 7 jet.

== Accidents and incidents ==
- On June 12, 1992, a Jet Charter Group Learjet 25 crashed after lifting off prematurely, it rolled rapidly to the right and impacted the ground in an inverted attitude. Both occupants were killed.
- On March 4, 2018, hydraulic issues forced a Flight for Life medical helicopter to make an emergency landing at the airport.
- On July 20, 2018, a vintage airplane crashed in a farm field near the airport after taking off. The National Transportation Safety Board said the jet was part of a formation training flight at the Sheboygan County Airport. The pilot was killed on impact. Two farm workers were injured.

== Images ==
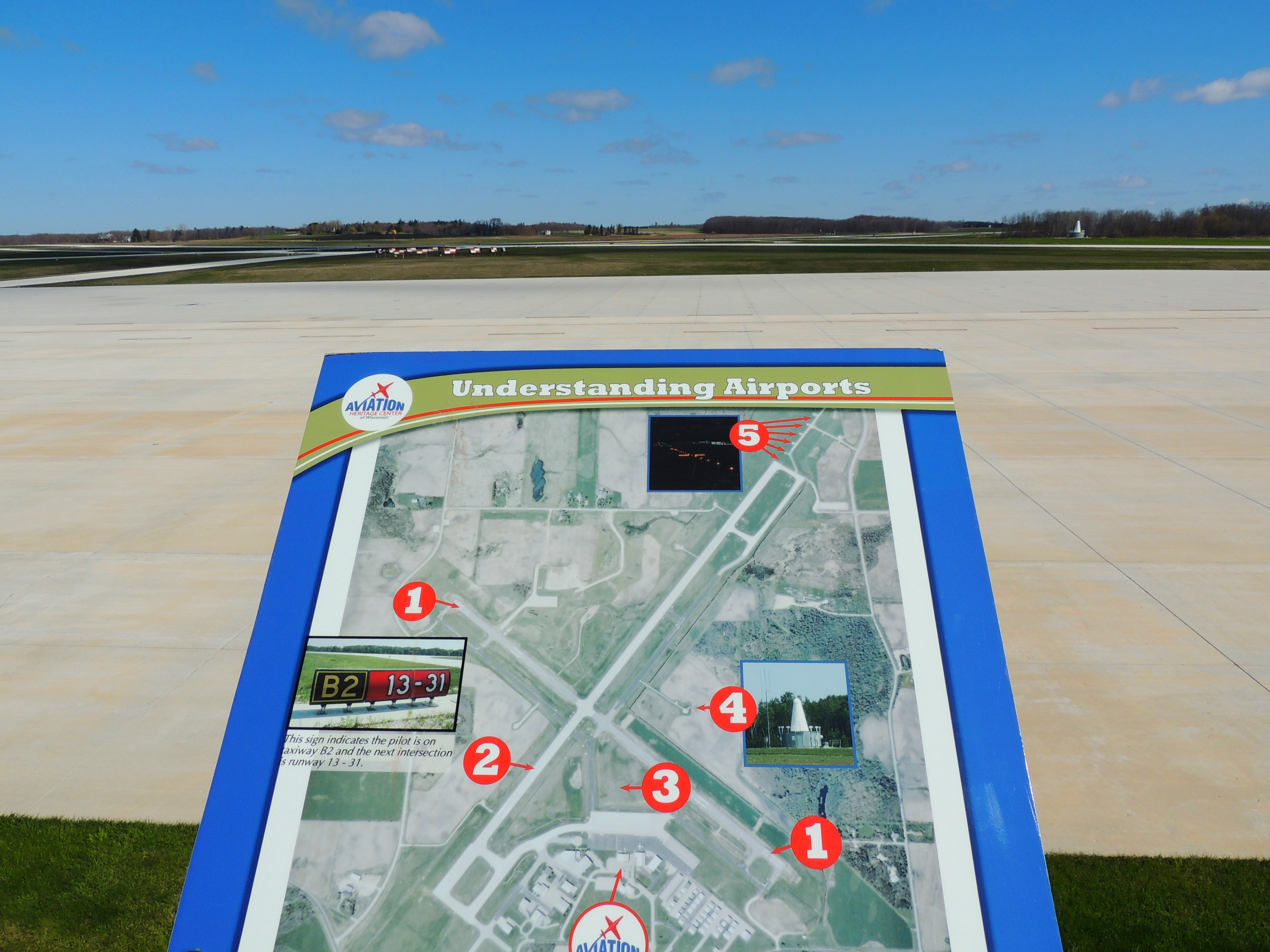
The Observation Deck from the Aviation Heritage Center building

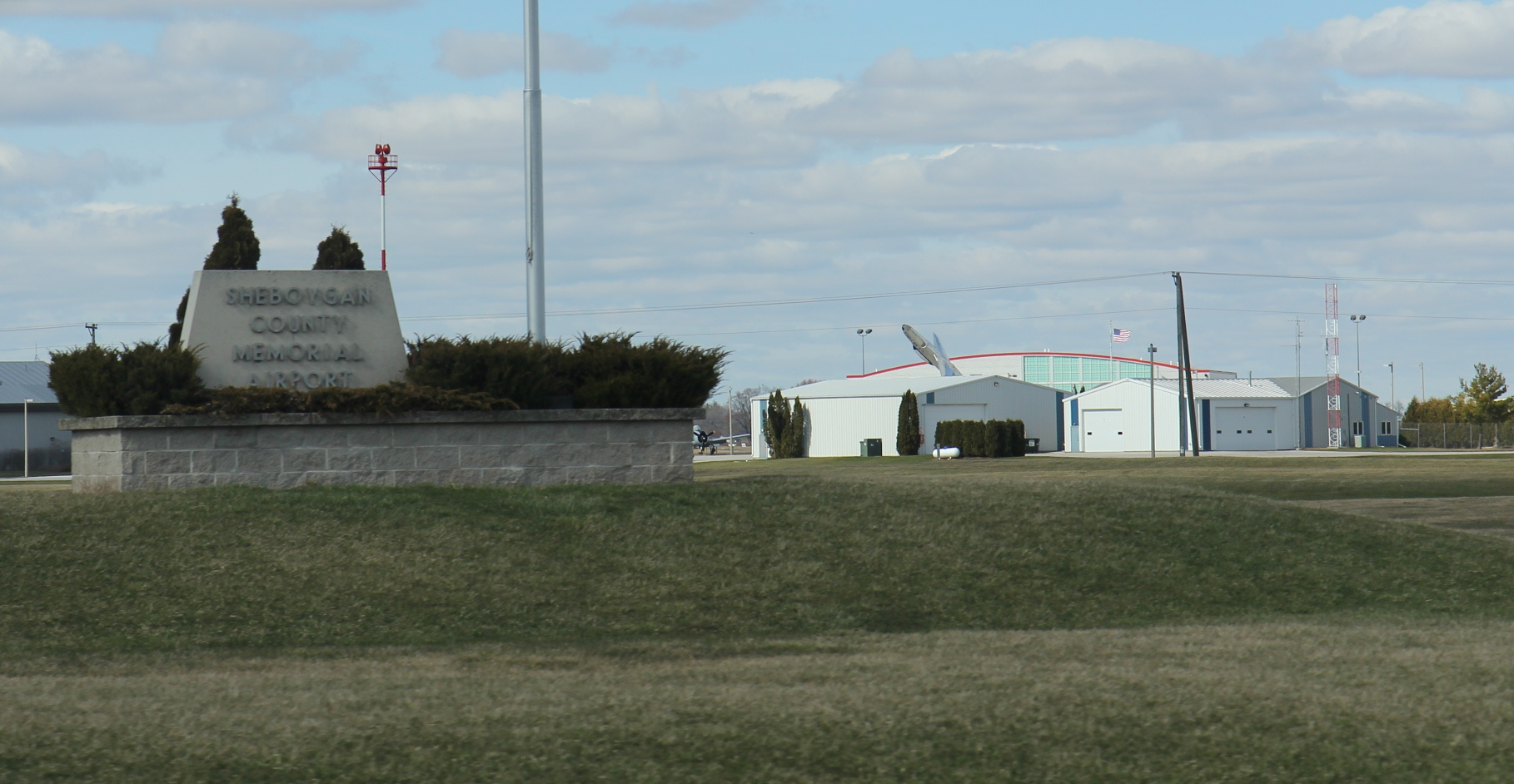
Sign and hangar

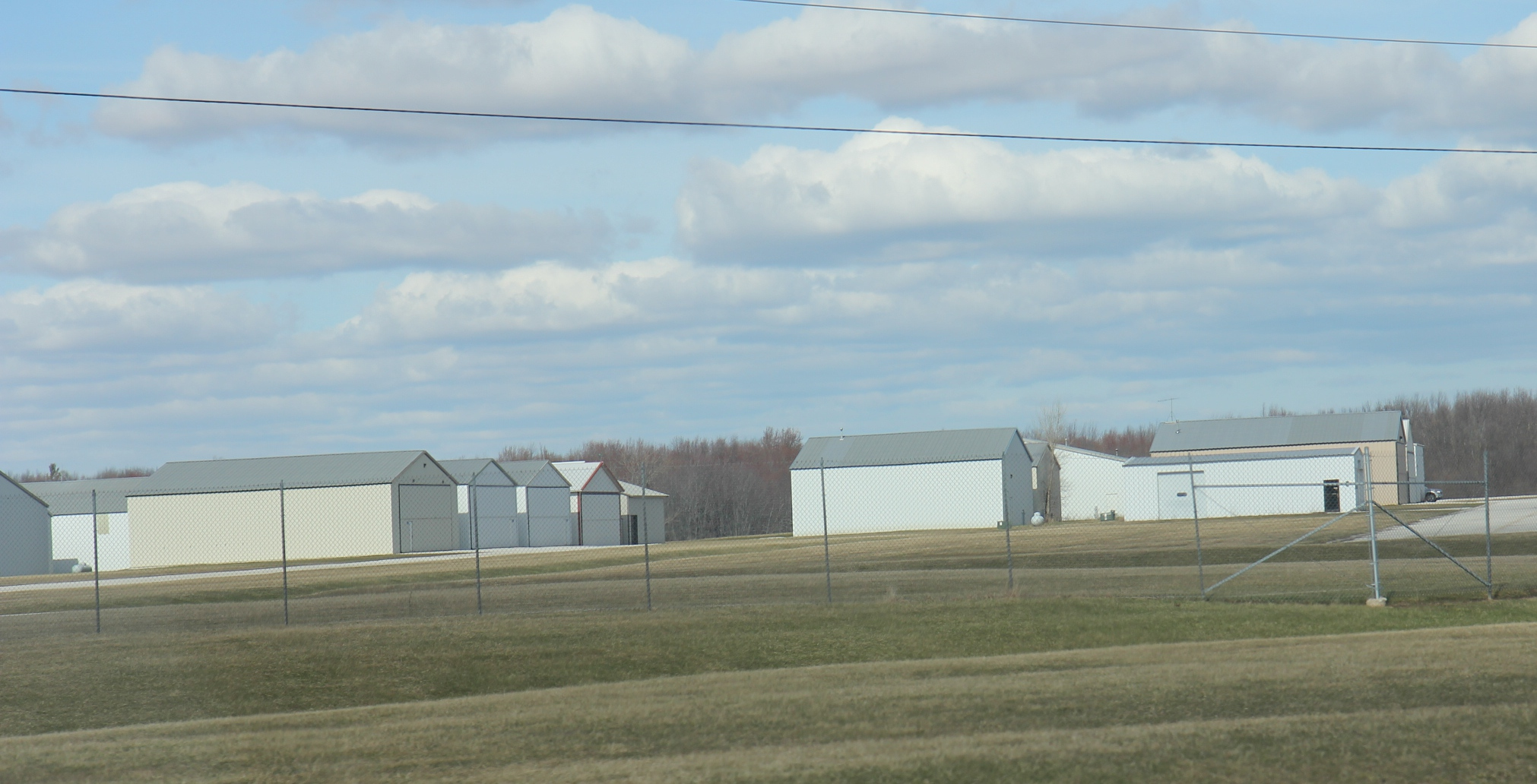
Hangars

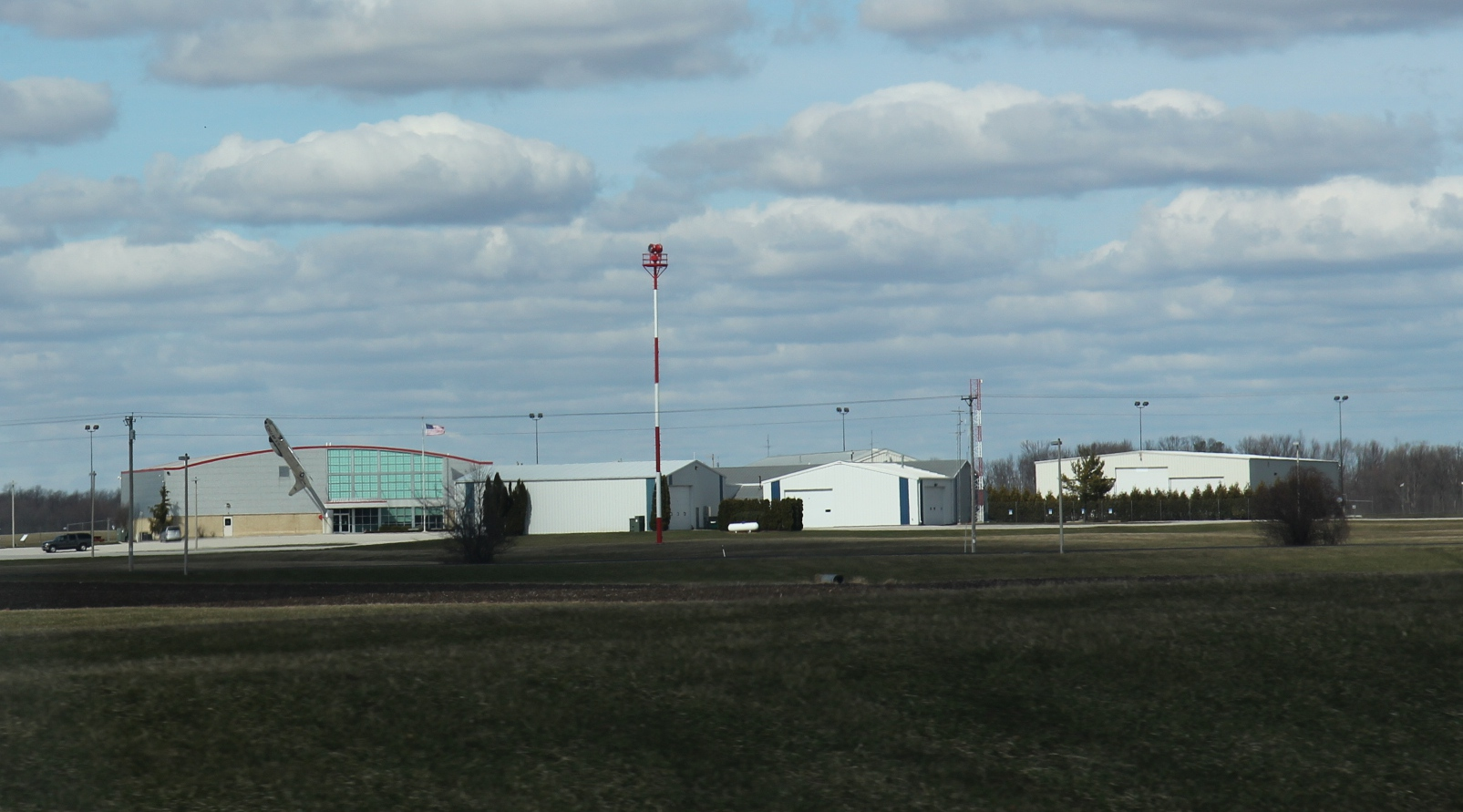
The airport in 2016

== See also ==
- List of airports in Wisconsin
