= Nels Holman =

American politician

Nels Holman (May 3, 1861 – April 21, 1946) was an American newspaper editor, businessman, and politician.

Born to Norwegian immigrants in the town of Deerfield, Dane County, Wisconsin, Holman went to Marshall Academy and Red Wing Seminary in Red Wing, Minnesota. Holman also graduated from University of Wisconsin Law School in 1888. Holman was a lumber retail dealer and lived in North Dakota and South Dakota. In 1895, Holman became publisher and editor of the newspaper the Deerfield Enterprise and later the Deerfield Independent. Holman served as town clerk, town supervisor, and town board chairman of the town of Deerfield. Holman served on the Dane County Board of Supervisors, as chairman of the board, and on the Deerfield school board. In 1893, Holman served in the Wisconsin State Assembly and was a Republican. He served as secretary of the Dane County Drainage Commission. In 1918, Holman moved to Madison, Wisconsin. He died at his home after taking a walk.
