= John Dassow =

American politician

John Dassow, Jr. (August 10, 1845 – October 8, 1917) was an American farmer, manufacturer, and politician.

Born in what is now Mecklenburg, Germany, Dassow emigrated with his parents, in 1861 to the United States and settled on a farm in the town of Sheboygan Falls, Sheboygan County, Wisconsin. In 1864 and 1865, Dassow served in the 30th Wisconsin Volunteer Infantry Regiment during the American Civil War. Dassow was a farmer and owned the Sheboygan County Mills. He was also involved with cheese factories and the real estate business. Dassow served on the Sheboygan County Board of Supervisors and was chairman of the county board. He was also treasurer of the local school board. In 1893, Dassow served in the Wisconsin State Assembly and was a Democrat. In 1917, Dassow died at his house in the town of Sheboygan Falls from ill health.
