= Deerfield (town), Dane County, Wisconsin =

Deerfield
- Town
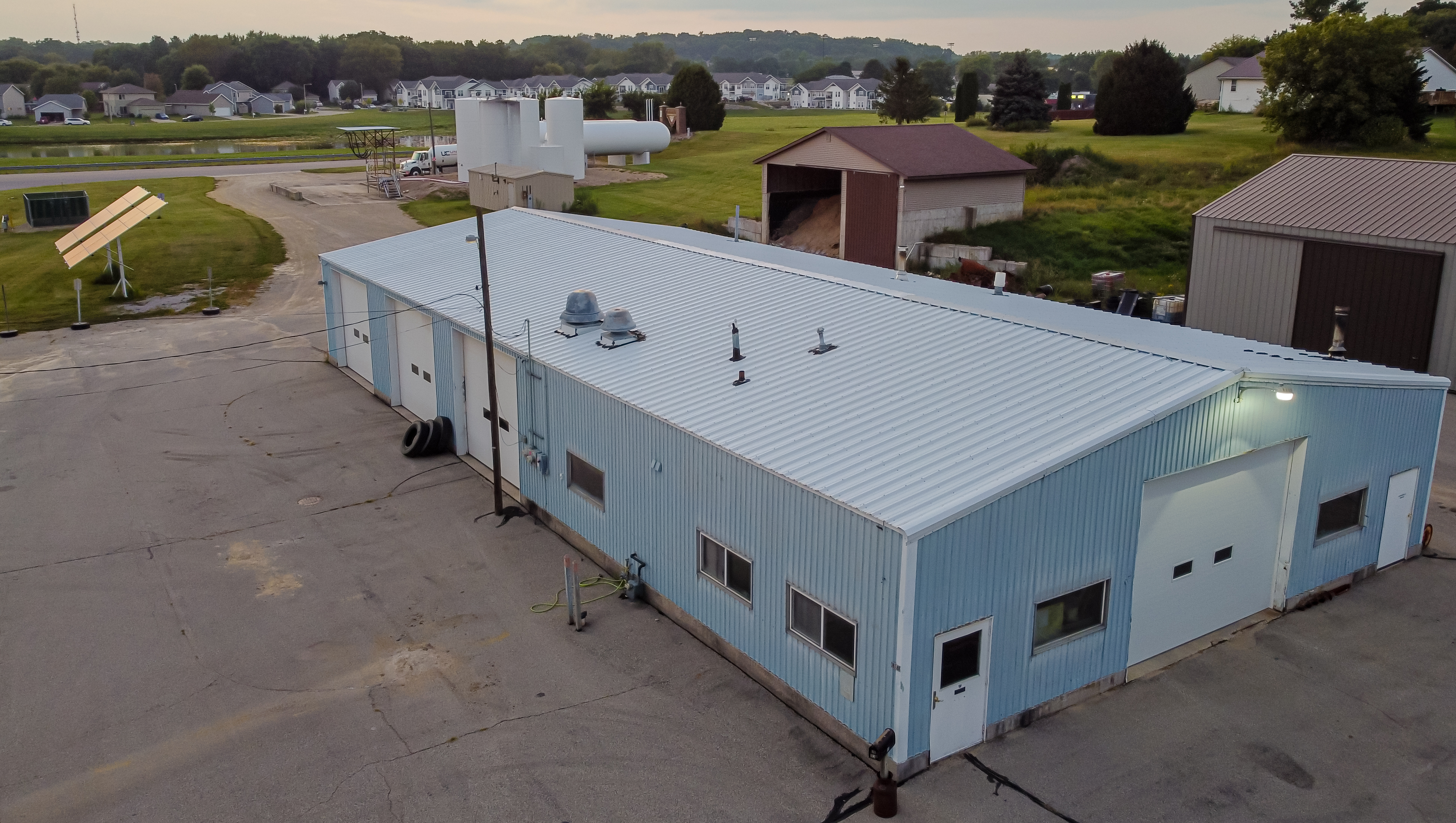
- Town hall

- Location in Dane County and the state of Wisconsin.
- Coordinates: 43°4′1″N 89°4′26″W
- Country: USA
- State: Wisconsin
- County: Dane

Area
  - Total: 34.5 sq mi (89 km^{2})
  - Land: 34.3 sq mi (89 km^{2})
  - Water: 0.2 sq mi (0.52 km^{2})

Population (2020)
  - Total: 1,684
  - Density: 49.1/sq mi (19.0/km^{2})
- Postal codes: 53531, 53559
- Area code: 608/353
- Website: www.town.deerfield.wi.us

Deerfield is a town in Dane County, Wisconsin, United States. The population was 1,684 at the 2020 census. The City of Deerfield is located within the town. The unincorporated communities of London and Old Deerfield are located in the town.

== Etymology ==
The town was named for the great number of deer in the surrounding fields.

== Geography ==
According to the United States Census Bureau, the town has a total area of 34.5 square miles (89.3 km^{2}), of which 34.3 square miles (88.9 km^{2}) is land and 0.2 square mile (0.4 km^{2}) (0.44%) is water.

== Demographics ==
As of the census of 2000, there were 1,470 people, 486 households, and 404 families residing in the town. The population density was 42.8 people per square mile (16.5/km^{2}). There were 503 housing units at an average density of 14.7 per square mile (5.7/km^{2}). The racial makeup of the town was 93.47% White, 3.74% Black or African American, 0.34% Native American, 0.88% Asian, 0.82% from other races, and 0.75% from two or more races. 1.50% of the population were Hispanic or Latino of any race.

There were 486 households, out of which 41.6% had children under the age of 18 living with them, 73.5% were married couples living together, 5.3% had a female householder with no husband present, and 16.7% were non-families. 12.6% of all households were made up of individuals, and 4.7% had someone living alone who was 65 years of age or older. The average household size was 2.77 and the average family size was 3.03.

In the town, the population was spread out, with 26.6% under the age of 18, 5.7% from 18 to 24, 33.6% from 25 to 44, 25.4% from 45 to 64, and 8.6% who were 65 years of age or older. The median age was 38 years. For every 100 females, there were 120.7 males. For every 100 females age 18 and over, there were 133.0 males.

The median income for a household in the town was $63,125, and the median income for a family was $66,359. Males had a median income of $41,786 versus $32,404 for females. The per capita income for the town was $24,763. About 1.0% of families and 2.2% of the population were below the poverty line, including none of those under age 18 and 6.7% of those age 65 or over.

== Notable people ==
- Nels Holman, Wisconsin State Representative, businessman, and newspaper, was born in the town; Holman served as chairman of the Deerfield Town Board
