= George Danielson (Wisconsin politician) =

American politician

George Danielson was a member of the Wisconsin State Assembly.

== Biography ==
Danielson was born on June 14, 1834, in Christiania (now Oslo) in Norway. He first settled in Neenah, Wisconsin, in 1854. After moving to Rock County in 1856, he returned there in 1861. Danielson died on September 5, 1909.

== Career ==
Danielson was elected to the Assembly in 1892. Other positions he held include town treasurer, city treasurer and alderman of Neenah. He was a Democrat.
