= Robert MacBride =

American politician

Robert MacBride (June 28, 1847 – January 20, 1934) was a member of the Wisconsin State Assembly and the Wisconsin State Senate.

== Biography ==
MacBride was born on June 28, 1847, in Philadelphia, Pennsylvania. He moved to Neillsville, Wisconsin, in 1866. MacBride married Addie Gates on June 28, 1870. They had two children. He died on January 20, 1934, in St. Louis, Missouri.

== Career ==
MacBridge was a Clark County, Wisconsin Judge from 1869 to 1877. He was elected to the Assembly in 1881. After being a delegate to the Democratic National Convention in 1880 and 1888, MacBride was elected to the Senate in 1890. In 1894, he was appointed U.S. Consul in Edinburgh, Scotland.
