= Charles Hirschinger =

American politician

Charles Hirschinger was a member of the Wisconsin State Assembly.

== Biography ==
Hirschiner was born on February 26, 1837. Later, he would reside on a farm in Baraboo, Wisconsin. He died on April 11, 1925.

== Political career ==
Hirschinger was a member of the Assembly during the 1893 and 1895 sessions. Other positions he held include Chairman (similar to Mayor) of Baraboo and of Freedom, Sauk County, Wisconsin and justice of the peace. He was a Republican.
