= Loyal, Wisconsin =

- City
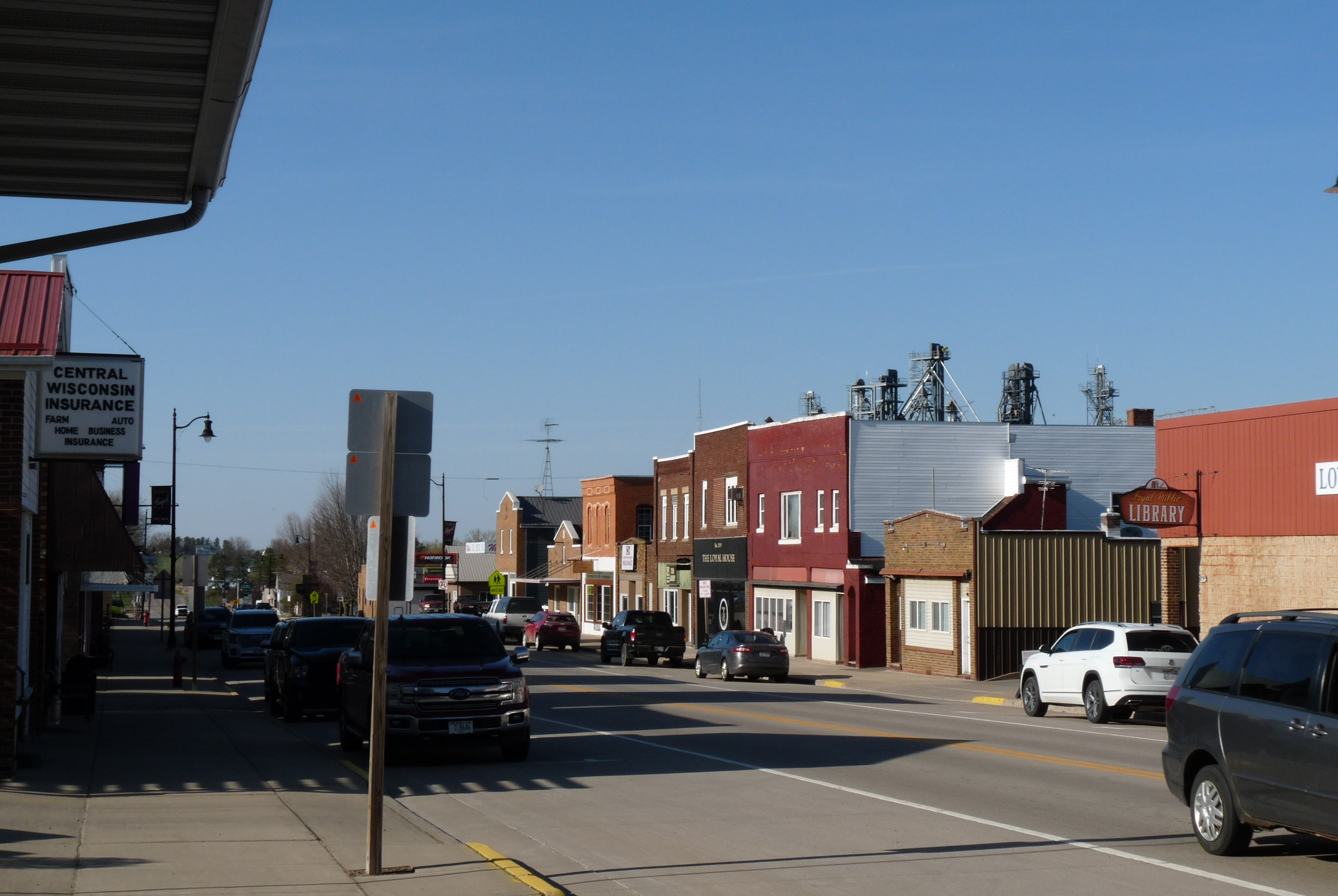
- The old downtown, looking north on WIS 98

- Location of Loyal in Clark County, Wisconsin.

- Location within Wisconsin Location within the United States
- Coordinates: 44°44′15″N 90°29′48″W
- Country: United States
- State: Wisconsin
- County: Clark

Area
  - Total: 1.37 sq mi (3.54 km^{2})
  - Land: 1.37 sq mi (3.54 km^{2})
  - Water: 0 sq mi (0.00 km^{2})
- Elevation: 1,240 ft (378 m)

Population (2020)
  - Total: 1,203
  - Density: 880/sq mi (340/km^{2})
- Time zone: UTC-6 (Central (CST))
  - Summer (DST): UTC-5 (CDT)
- ZIP code: 54446
- Area codes: 715 & 534
- FIPS code: 55-46075
- GNIS feature ID: 1568773
- Website: loyalwi.com

Loyal is a city in Clark County, Wisconsin, United States. The population was 1,203 at the 2020 census. The city is located within the Town of Loyal, though it is politically independent.

Its name comes from the 1860s, when so many of its patriotic pioneers went to fight in the Civil War. A store was established at the site in 1870, the place platted in 1885, incorporated as a village in 1893, and changed to a city in 1948.

== Geography ==
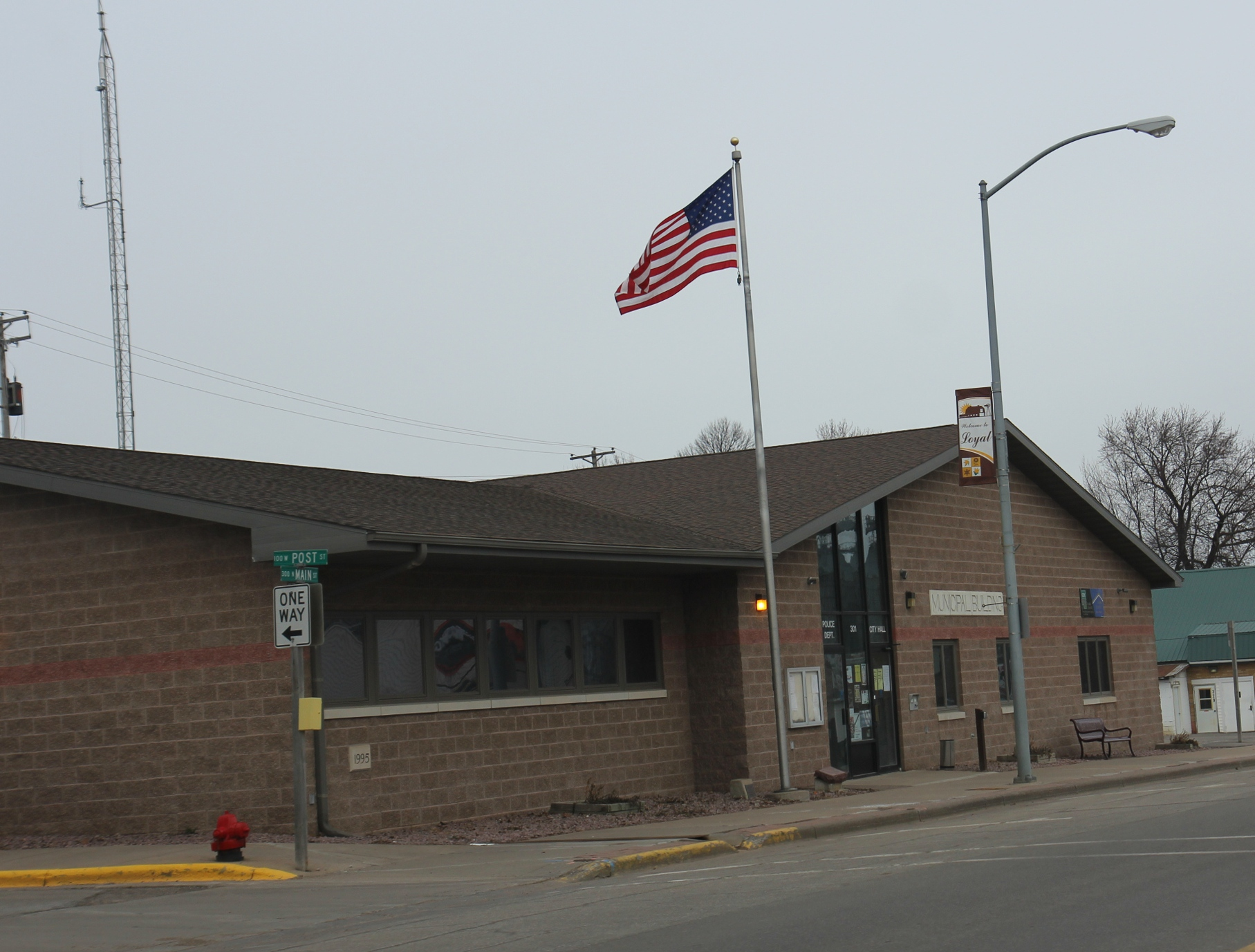
The municipal building

Loyal is located at 44°44′15″N 90°29′47″W (44.737541, -90.496551).

According to the United States Census Bureau, the city has a total area of 1.39 square miles (3.60 km^{2}), all land.

== Demographics ==
Historical population
Census	Pop.	Note	%±
1880	46		—
1900	645		—
1910	677		5.0%
1920	735		8.6%
1930	862		17.3%
1940	921		6.8%
1950	1,104		19.9%
1960	1,146		3.8%
1970	1,126		−1.7%
1980	1,252		11.2%
1990	1,244		−0.6%
2000	1,308		5.1%
2010	1,261		−3.6%
2020	1,203		−4.6%
U.S. Decennial Census

=== 2010 census ===
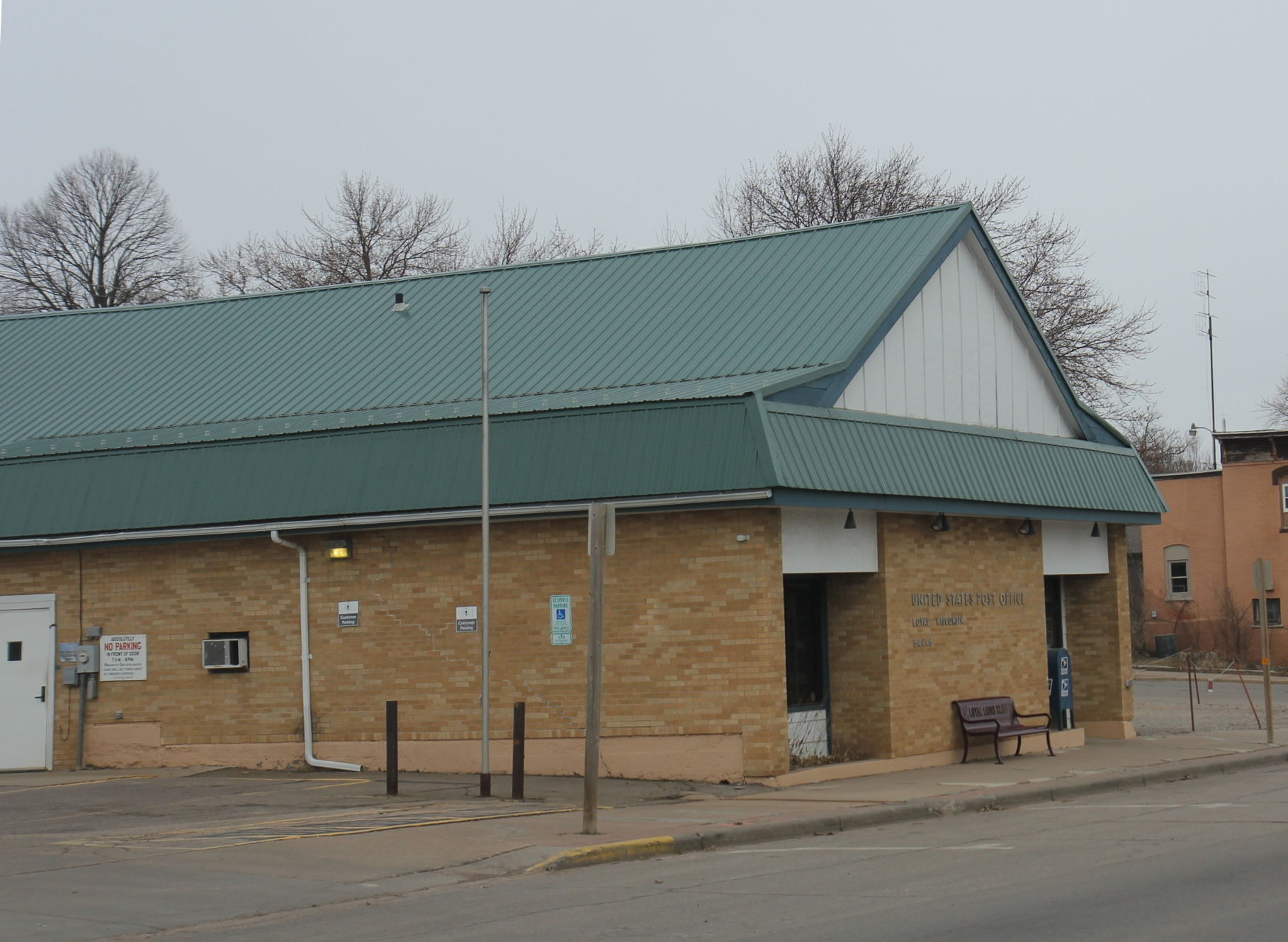
Post office

As of the census of 2010, there were 1,261 people, 538 households, and 344 families living in the city. The population density was 907.2 inhabitants per square mile (350.3/km^{2}). There were 603 housing units at an average density of 433.8 per square mile (167.5/km^{2}). The racial makeup of the city was 98.3% White, 0.2% African American, 0.5% Native American, 0.2% Asian, 0.6% from other races, and 0.2% from two or more races. Hispanic or Latino of any race were 1.0% of the population.

There were 538 households, of which 29.6% had children under the age of 18 living with them, 49.6% were married couples living together, 10.2% had a female householder with no husband present, 4.1% had a male householder with no wife present, and 36.1% were non-families. 29.7% of all households were made up of individuals, and 14.1% had someone living alone who was 65 years of age or older. The average household size was 2.34 and the average family size was 2.88.

The median age in the city was 41 years. 24.8% of residents were under the age of 18; 7.7% were between the ages of 18 and 24; 24.5% were from 25 to 44; 20.3% were from 45 to 64; and 22.8% were 65 years of age or older. The gender makeup of the city was 49.1% male and 50.9% female.

=== 2000 census ===
As of the census of 2000, there were 1,308 people, 548 households, and 366 families living in the city. The population density was 951.8 people per square mile (368.6/km^{2}). There were 576 housing units at an average density of 419.1 per square mile (162.3/km^{2}). The racial makeup of the city was 98.93% White, 0.46% Black or African American, 0.08% Asian, 0.23% from other races, and 0.31% from two or more races. 0.76% of the population were Hispanic or Latino of any race.

There were 548 households, out of which 28.8% had children under the age of 18 living with them, 54.0% were married couples living together, 9.1% had a female householder with no husband present, and 33.2% were non-families. 29.7% of all households were made up of individuals, and 16.6% had someone living alone who was 65 years of age or older. The average household size was 2.38 and the average family size was 2.94.

In the city, the population was spread out, with 26.0% under the age of 18, 6.7% from 18 to 24, 27.1% from 25 to 44, 19.0% from 45 to 64, and 21.3% who were 65 years of age or older. The median age was 37 years. For every 100 females, there were 89.8 males. For every 100 females age 18 and over, there were 86.2 males.

The median income for a household in the city was $30,647, and the median income for a family was $38,026. Males had a median income of $27,727 versus $20,197 for females. The per capita income for the city was $16,502. About 5.4% of families and 10.5% of the population were below the poverty line, including 14.0% of those under age 18 and 13.5% of those age 65 or over.

== Education ==
Loyal has three schools: Loyal Elementary School; Loyal High School, home of the Greyhounds; and Saint Anthony's Catholic School.

== Events ==
Loyal's biggest event is the Loyal Corn Festival.

== Notable people ==
- Fred W. Draper (1868 - 1962), Wisconsin State Representative and educator, lived in Loyal.
- Baldwin W. Fullmer (1834 - 1910), Wisconsin State Representative, lived in Loyal.
- Mary Lazich (born 1952), Wisconsin State Senator, born in Loyal.
- Stephen Buchanan (born 2000), NCAA wrestling champion, lived in Loyal.

== Images ==
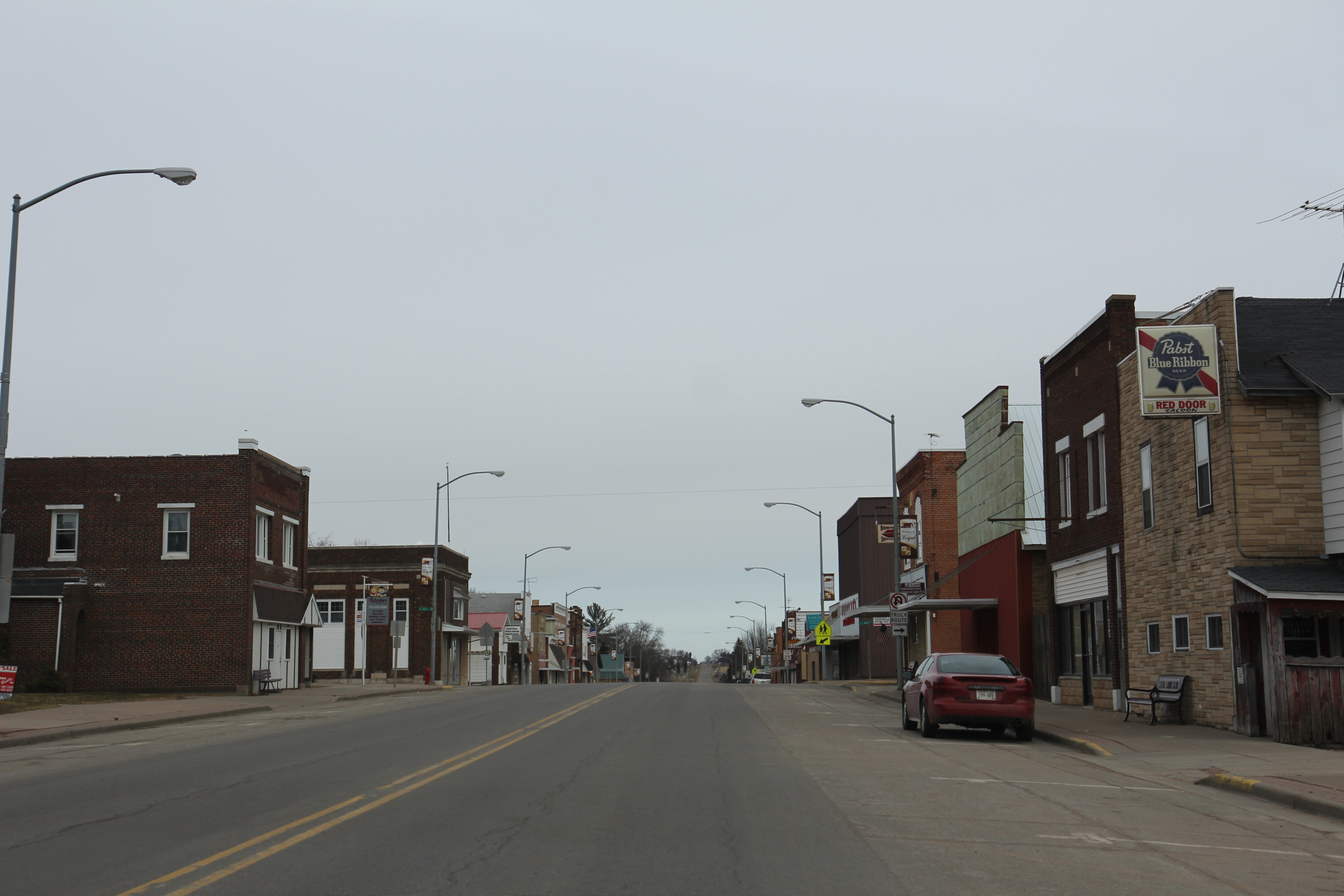
The old downtown, looking north

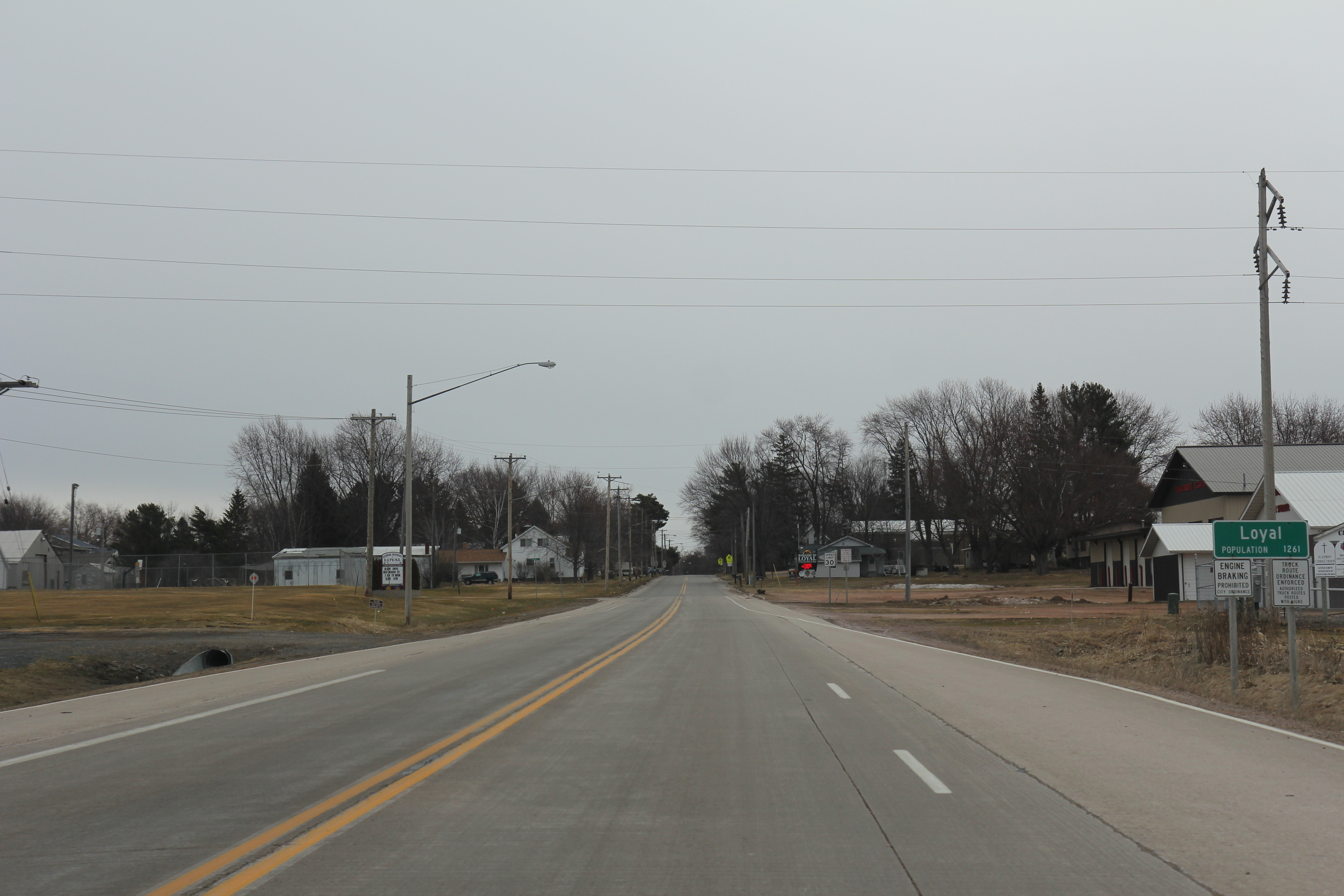
The sign for Loyal on WIS 98

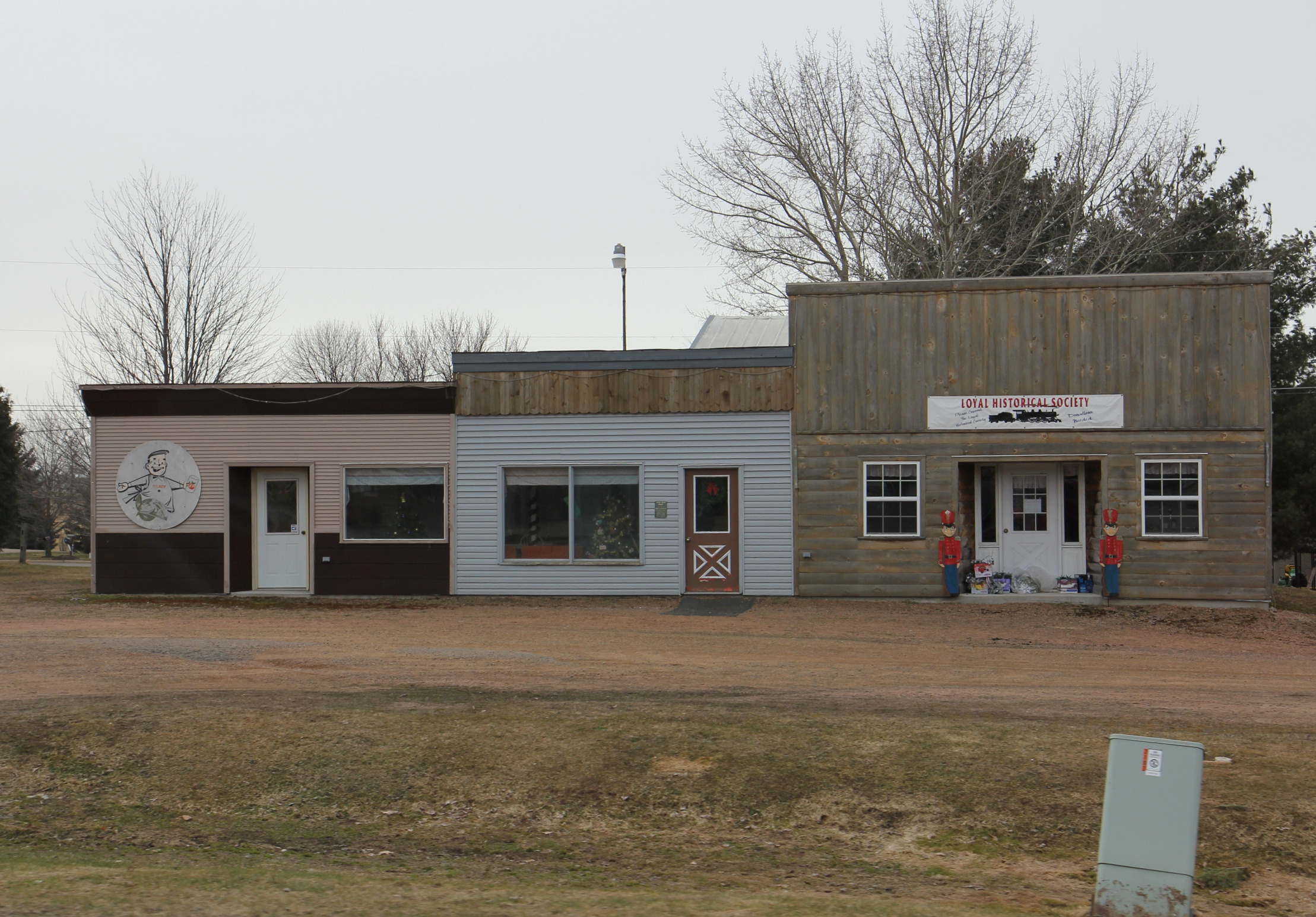
Loyal Historical Society buildings

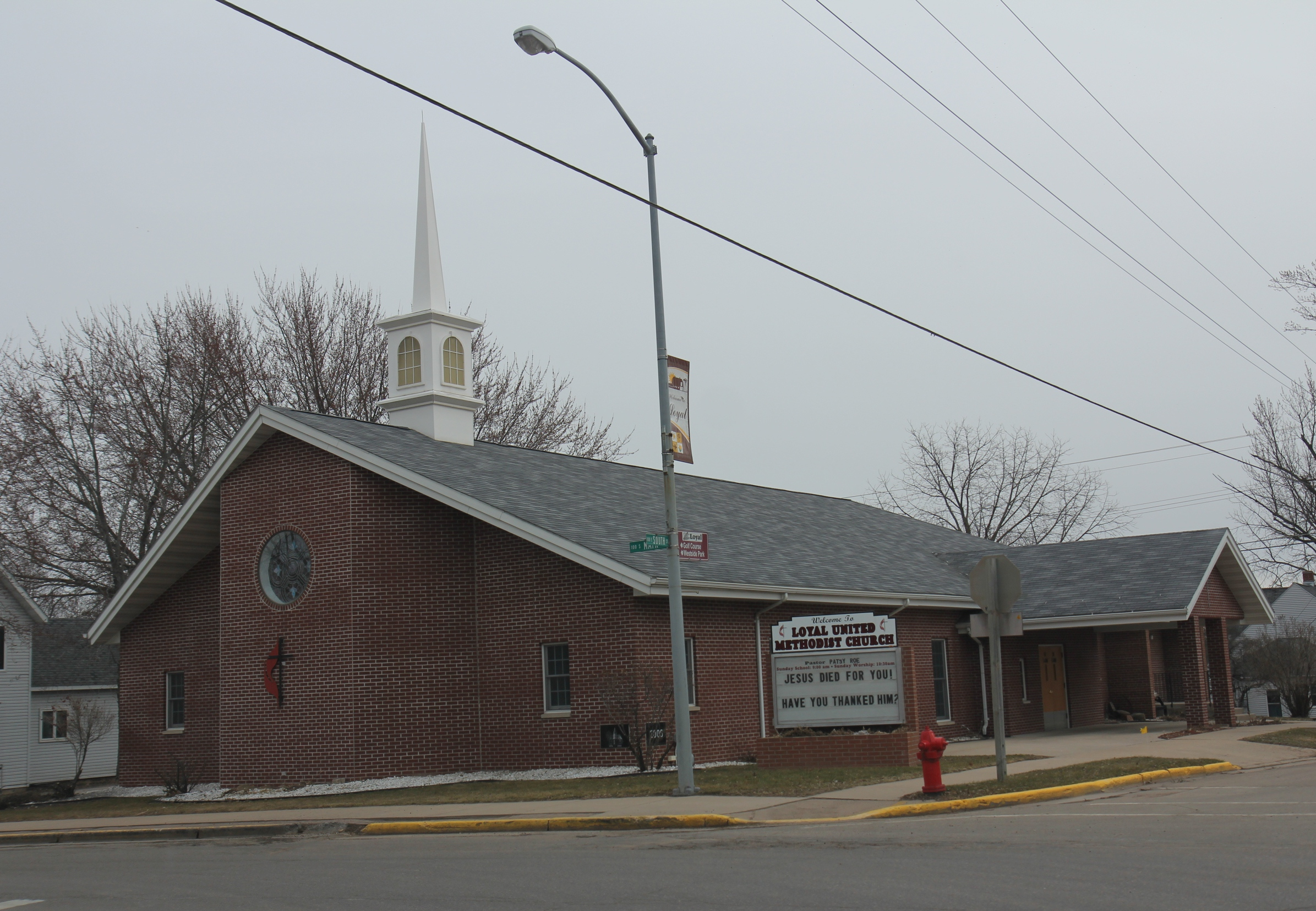
United Methodist Church
