= Dayne Wescott =

American politician

Dayne Wescott was a member of the Wisconsin State Senate.

== Biography ==
Wescott was born on December 11, 1850, in Oshkosh, Wisconsin. He died on July 7, 1929, in Shawano, Wisconsin.

== Career ==
Wescott was elected to the Senate in 1892. Previously, he was Register of Deeds of Shawano County, Wisconsin, from 1873 to 1877; Clerk of Shawano County from 1879 to 1883 and Treasurer of Shawano County from 1885 to 1889. He was a Democrat.
