= Sheboygan Falls (town), Wisconsin =

Sheboygan Falls, Wisconsin
- Town
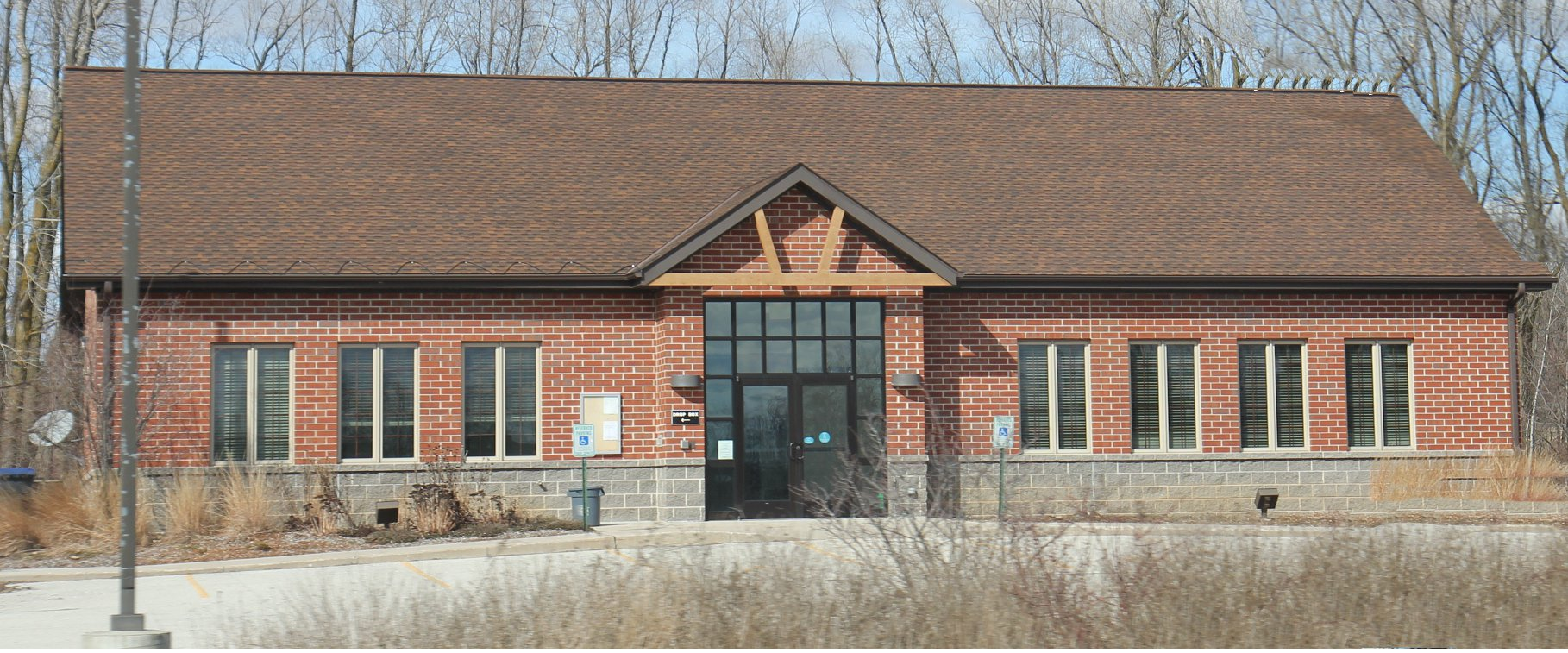
- Town hall

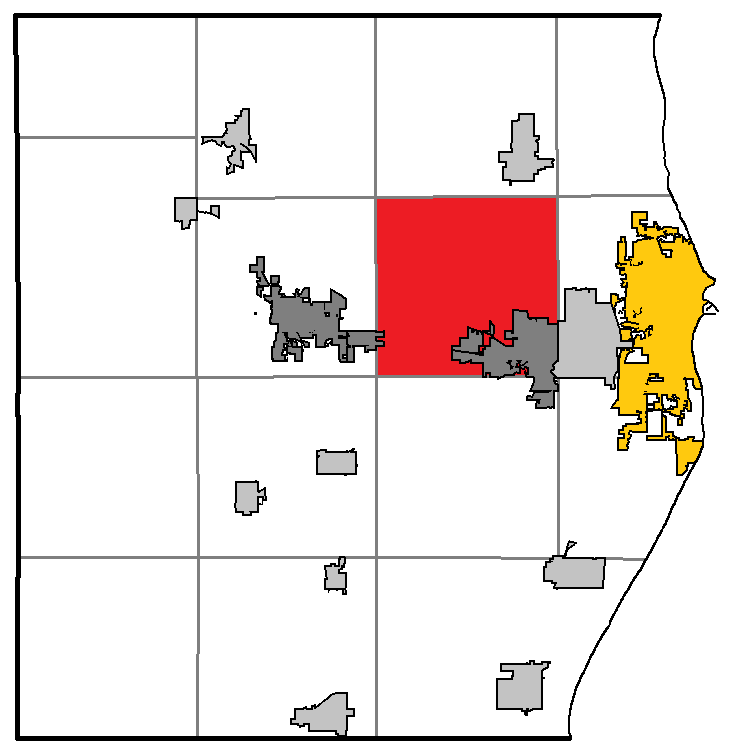
- Location of Sheboygan Falls, within Sheboygan County
- Coordinates: 43°45′21″N 87°51′49″W
- Country: United States
- State: Wisconsin
- County: Sheboygan

Area
  - Total: 32.0 sq mi (83.0 km^{2})
  - Land: 32.0 sq mi (82.9 km^{2})
  - Water: 0.039 sq mi (0.1 km^{2})
- Elevation: 741 ft (226 m)

Population (2020)
  - Total: 1,824
  - Density: 57.0/sq mi (22.0/km^{2})
- Time zone: UTC-6 (Central (CST))
  - Summer (DST): UTC-5 (CDT)
- Area code: 920
- FIPS code: 55-73050
- GNIS feature ID: 1584139
- Website: Official website

Sheboygan Falls is a town located in Sheboygan County, Wisconsin, United States. As of the 2020 census, the town had a total population of 1,824. It is included in the Sheboygan, Wisconsin Metropolitan Statistical Area. The unincorporated community of Johnsonville is located in the town, five miles northwest from the city.

== Geography ==
According to the United States Census Bureau, the town has a total area of 32.0 square miles (83.0 km^{2}), of which 32.0 square miles (82.9 km^{2}) is land and 0.04 square miles (0.1 km^{2}) is water. The total area comprises 0.06% water.

== Demographics ==
As of the census of 2000, there were 1,706 people, 657 households, and 503 families residing in the town. The population density was 53.3 people per square mile (20.6/km^{2}). There were 675 housing units at an average density of 21.1 per square mile (8.1/km^{2}). The racial makeup of the town was 98.18% White, 0.00% Black or African American, 0.35% Native American, 1.11% Asian, 0.00% Pacific Islander, 0.06% from other races, and 0.29% from two or more races. 0.53% of the population were Hispanic or Latino of any race.

There were 657 households, out of which 28.6% had children under the age of 18 living with them, 68.3% were married couples living together, 5.6% had a female householder with no husband present, and 23.4% were non-families. 19.3% of all households were made up of individuals, and 7.2% had someone living alone who was 65 years of age or older. The average household size was 2.59 and the average family size was 2.99.

In the town, the population was spread out, with 21.7% under the age of 18, 8.0% from 18 to 24, 29.3% from 25 to 44, 28.1% from 45 to 64, and 12.9% who were 65 years of age or older. The median age was 40 years. For every 100 females, there were 103.8 males. For every 100 females age 18 and over, there were 106.3 males.

The median income for a household in the town was $50,489, and the median income for a family was $55,909. Males had a median income of $35,077 versus $24,844 for females. The per capita income for the town was $23,915. 2.0% of the population and 1.2% of families were below the poverty line. 1.9% of those under the age of 18 and 1.6% of those 65 and older were living below the poverty line.

== Transportation ==
Sheboygan Falls is served by the Sheboygan County Memorial Airport (KSBM), which serves the town and surrounding communities.

== Notable people ==
- John Dassow, farmer, manufacturer, and legislator
- Charles A. Laack, farmer, businessman, and legislator
- Clifford Otte, firefighter and legislator
- Louis H. Prange, farmer and legislator
