= 42nd Wisconsin Legislature =

Wisconsin legislative term for 1895-1896

←	41st	43rd	→
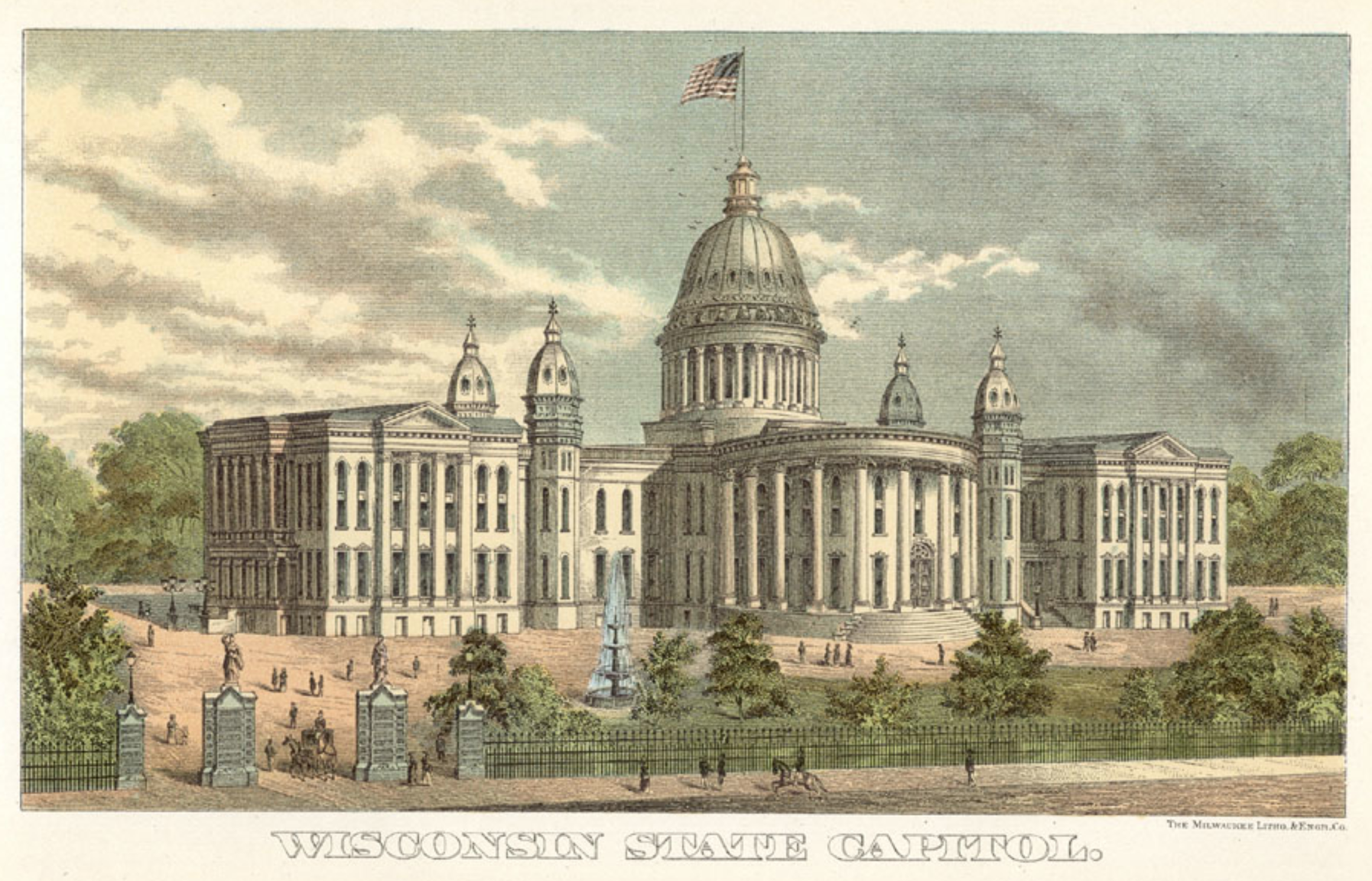
- Wisconsin State Capitol, 1887

Overview
- Legislative body: Wisconsin Legislature
- Meeting place: Wisconsin State Capitol
- Term: January 7, 1895 – January 4, 1897
- Election: November 6, 1894

Senate
- Members: 33
- Senate President: Emil Baensch (R)
- President pro tempore: Thompson Weeks (R)
- Party control: Republican

Assembly
- Members: 100
- Assembly Speaker: George B. Burrows (R)
- Party control: Republican

Sessions
- 1st: January 9, 1895 – April 20, 1895

Special sessions
- 1896 Special: February 18, 1896 – February 28, 1896

The 42nd Wisconsin Legislature' convened from January 9, 1895, to April 20, 1895, in regular session. They convened again in special session in February 1896 to pass a legislative redistricting law.

Senators representing odd-numbered districts were newly elected for this session and were serving the first two years of a four-year term. Assembly members were elected to a two-year term. Assembly members and odd-numbered senators were elected in the general election of November 6, 1894. Senators representing even-numbered districts were serving the third and fourth year of a four-year term, having been elected in the general election of November 8, 1892.

The governor of Wisconsin during this entire term was Republican William H. Upham, of Wood County, serving a two-year term, having won election in the 1894 Wisconsin gubernatorial election.

== Major events ==
- January 7, 1895: Inauguration of William H. Upham as 18th Governor of Wisconsin.
- February 25, 1895: The first rebellions of the Cuban War of Independence began.
- May 27, 1895: The United States Supreme Court, in the case In re Debs, ruled that the United States government had the authority to regulate interstate commerce.
- July 14, 1895: Wisconsin Supreme Court chief justice Harlow S. Orton died in office. He was succeeded as chief justice by John B. Cassoday by rule of seniority.
- August 5, 1895: Roujet D. Marshall was appointed to the Wisconsin Supreme Court to fill the vacancy caused by the death of Harlow S. Orton.
- January 4, 1896: Utah was admitted as the 45th U.S. state.
- May 18, 1896: The United States Supreme Court, in the case Plessy v. Ferguson, ruled that racial segregation was legal as long as facilities were "equal", later referred to as the "separate but equal" doctrine.
- May 25, 1896: Former three-term Wisconsin Governor and Union Army general Lucius Fairchild died in Madison.
- June 6, 1896: U.S. President Grover Cleveland signed the "Filled Cheese Act", which established a prohibitive tax on cheese products that had been enhanced with vegetable oil or other fats. This law was proposed by Wisconsin congressman Samuel A. Cook, and was part of a decades-long effort by Wisconsin's congressional delegation to prohibit selling margarine or other alternatives to dairy products.
- July 9, 1896: William Jennings Bryan delivered his famous Cross of Gold speech at the 1896 Democratic National Convention.
- August 23, 1896: The Cry of Pugad Lawin initiated the Philippine Revolution.
- November 3, 1896: 1896 United States general election:
  - William McKinley elected President of the United States.
  - Edward Scofield elected Governor of Wisconsin.
  - Wisconsin voters rejected a proposed constitutional amendment to allow the Legislature to set the salary of the state superintendent of public instruction.

== Major legislation ==
- Joint Resolution agreeing to a proposed amendment to section 1, article 10, of the constitution of the state of Wisconsin, 1895 Joint Resolution 2.
- Joint Resolution that section 7, article 7, constitution of Wisconsin, relating to circuit courts be amended so as to read as follows, 1895 Joint Resolution 8. Proposed an amendment to the state constitution to allow counties with large populations to have more than one circuit judge.
- 1896 Wisc. Special Session Act 1, a legislative redistricting law based on Wisconsin's mid-decade state census.

== Summary ==
=== Senate summary ===
Senate partisan composition Democratic: 13 seats Republican: 20 seats

	Party (Shading indicates majority caucus)		Total	
	Dem.	Rep.	Total	Vacant
End of previous Legislature	25	7	32	1
Start of 1st Session	13	20	33	0
Final voting share	39.39%	60.61%		
Beginning of the next Legislature	4	29	33	0

=== Assembly summary ===
Assembly partisan composition Democratic: 19 seats Republican: 81 seats

	Party (Shading indicates majority caucus)			Total	
	Dem.	Pop.	Rep.	Total	Vacant
End of previous Legislature	56	0	44	100	0
Start of 1st Session	19	0	81	100	0
Final voting share	19%		81%		
Beginning of the next Legislature	9	1	90	100	0

== Sessions ==
- 1st Regular session: January 9, 1895 – April 20, 1895
- February 1896 Special session: February 18, 1896 – February 28, 1896

== Leaders ==
=== Senate leadership ===
- President of the Senate: Emil Baensch (R)
- President pro tempore: Thompson Weeks (R)

=== Assembly leadership ===
- Speaker of the Assembly: George B. Burrows (R)

== Members ==
=== Members of the Senate ===
Members of the Senate for the Forty-Second Wisconsin Legislature:

Senate partisan representation Democratic: 13 seats Republican: 20 seats

Dist.	Counties	Senator	Residence	Party
01	Door, Kewaunee, & Marinette	De Wayne Stebbins	Ahnapee	Rep.
02	Brown & Oconto	Robert J. McGeehan	De Pere	Dem.
03	Kenosha & Racine	Ernst Timme	Kenosha	Rep.
04	Milwaukee (City Northeast)	James C. Officer	Milwaukee	Rep.
05	Milwaukee (City South)	William H. Austin	Milwaukee	Rep.
06	Milwaukee (City Center)	Oscar Altpeter	Milwaukee	Dem.
07	Northern Milwaukee & eastern Waukesha	Charles T. Fisher	Milwaukee	Rep.
08	Milwaukee (County South)	Michał Kruszka	Milwaukee	Dem.
09	Adams, Juneau, Marquette, & Green Lake	Clarence V. Peirce	Germania	Rep.
10	Pierce, Polk, & St. Croix	Dempster Woodworth	Ellsworth	Rep.
11	Ashland, Bayfield, Burnett, Douglas, Sawyer, & Washburn	Thomas B. Mills	West Superior	Rep.
12	Marathon & Wood	Neal Brown	Wausau	Dem.
13	Eastern Columbia & southern Dodge	Michael E. Burke	Beaver Dam	Dem.
14	Florence, Forest, Langlade, Lincoln, & Shawano	Dayne Wescott	Shawano	Dem.
15	Calumet & Manitowoc	John E. McMullen	Chilton	Dem.
16	Crawford, Richland, & northern Grant	Charles H. Baxter	Lancaster	Rep.
17	Green, southeast Dane, & western Rock	Henry Putnam	Brodhead	Rep.
18	Fond du Lac	Lyman W. Thayer	Ripon	Rep.
19	Winnebago	Charles W. Davis	Oshkosh	Rep.
20	Sheboygan	Dennis T. Phalen	Sheboygan	Dem.
21	Portage, Waushara, & western Waupaca	John Phillips	Stevens Point	Rep.
22	Outagamie & eastern Waupaca	William Kennedy	Appleton	Dem.
23	Jefferson & western Waukesha	Albert Solliday	Watertown	Dem.
24	Walworth & eastern Rock	Thompson Weeks	Whitewater	Rep.
25	Clark & Eau Claire	Clarion A. Youmans	Neillsville	Rep.
26	Dane (Most)	Robert M. Bashford	Madison	Dem.
27	Sauk & western Columbia	William F. Conger	Prairie du Sac	Rep.
28	Iowa, Lafayette, & southern Grant	Calvert Spensley	Mineral Point	Rep.
29	Buffalo, Barron, Dunn, & Pepin	James H. Stout	Menomonie	Rep.
30	Chippewa, Oneida, Price, & Taylor	Levi F. Martin	Chippewa Falls	Dem.
31	Jackson, Monroe, & Vernon	James J. McGillivray	Black River Falls	Rep.
32	La Crosse & Trempealeau	Levi Withee	La Crosse	Rep.
33	Ozaukee, Washington, & northeast Dodge	Stephen F. Mayer	West Bend	Dem.

=== Members of the Assembly ===
Members of the Assembly for the Forty-Second Wisconsin Legislature:

Assembly partisan composition Democratic: 19 seats Republican: 81 seats

Senate District	County	Dist.	Representative	Party	Residence
09	Adams & Marquette		Sophronius S. Landt	Rep.	Friendship
11	Ashland		Henry L. Besse	Rep.	Butternut
29	Barron		Jonathan J. Smith	Rep.	Barron
11	Bayfield, Burnett, Sawyer, & Washburn		William O'Neill	Rep.	Washburn
02	Brown	1	Henry F. Hagemeister	Dem.	Green Bay
02	Brown	2	Timothy Burke	Rep.	Morrison
29	Buffalo & Pepin		Allen H. DeGroff	Rep.	Nelson
15	Calumet		Joseph Wolfinger	Dem.	Woodville
30	Chippewa	1	Charles A. Stanley	Rep.	Chippewa Falls
30	Chippewa	2	John W. Thomas	Rep.	Anson
25	Clark		Joseph C. Marsh	Rep.	Loyal
27	Columbia	1	Charles Mohr	Rep.	Portage
13	Columbia	2	Joseph Sanderson	Rep.	Randolph
16	Crawford		James O. Davidson	Rep.	Soldiers Grove
26	Dane	1	George B. Burrows	Rep.	Madison
26	Dane	2	Hiland J. Spaulding	Rep.	Vienna
17	Dane	3	Ole C. Lee	Rep.	Stoughton
26	Dane	4	Henry F. Wilke	Rep.	Verona
33	Dodge	1	Herman Rosenkranz	Dem.	Lomira
13	Dodge	2	Henry Gilmore	Dem.	Beaver Dam
13	Dodge	3	William Jeche	Dem.	Hustisford
01	Door		James Hanson	Rep.	Ephraim
11	Douglas		Henry C. Sloan	Rep.	Superior
29	Dunn		Albert R. Hall	Rep.	Knapp
25	Eau Claire	1	Marshall Cousins	Rep.	Eau Claire
25	Eau Claire	2	Charles F. Hanke	Rep.	Augusta
18	Fond du Lac	1	Frank L. Bacon	Rep.	Waupun
18	Fond du Lac	2	Louie A. Lange	Dem.	Fond du Lac
18	Fond du Lac	3	Peter McGalloway	Dem.	Forest
16	Grant	1	Adelbert L. Utt	Rep.	Platteville
28	Grant	2	Joshua B. Bradbury	Rep.	Mount Ida
17	Green		Nathaniel B. Treat	Rep.	Monroe
09	Green Lake		Frank E. Clark	Rep.	Princeton
28	Iowa		William A. Jones	Rep.	Mineral Point
31	Jackson		Jerome B. Miller	Rep.	Alma
23	Jefferson	1	John G. Conway	Dem.	Watertown
23	Jefferson	2	Henry C. Christians	Dem.	Johnson Creek
09	Juneau		Frank E. Hurd	Rep.	New Lisbon
03	Kenosha		John F. Reynolds	Rep.	Randall
01	Kewaunee		Jacob Rodrian	Dem.	Ahnapee
32	La Crosse	1	George H. Ray	Rep.	La Crosse
32	La Crosse	2	Lemuel B. Cox	Rep.	Farmington
28	Lafayette		James W. Freeman	Rep.	Shullsburg
14	Florence, Forest, & Langlade		George W. Latta	Rep.	Antigo
14	Lincoln		David Finn	Dem.	Merrill
15	Manitowoc	1	Fred C. Maertz	Dem.	Reedsville
15	Manitowoc	2	William Croll	Dem.	Manitowoc
12	Marathon	1	Robert Plisch	Dem.	Berlin
12	Marathon	2	George Werheim	Rep.	Wausau
01	Marinette		George W. Taylor	Rep.	Marinette
04	Milwaukee	1	Henry S. Dodge	Rep.	Milwaukee
04	Milwaukee	2	George R. Mahoney	Dem.	Milwaukee
04	Milwaukee	3	Gustav Jeske	Rep.	Milwaukee
05	Milwaukee	4	Frank A. Anson	Rep.	Milwaukee
07	Milwaukee	5	Albert Woller	Rep.	Milwaukee
06	Milwaukee	6	Reinhard Klabunde	Rep.	Milwaukee
06	Milwaukee	7	Edward C. Notbohm	Rep.	Milwaukee
05	Milwaukee	8	Ellicott R. Stillman	Rep.	Milwaukee
05	Milwaukee	9	Charles A. Winters	Rep.	Milwaukee
08	Milwaukee	10	Theodore Prochnow	Rep.	Milwaukee
06	Milwaukee	11	Christoph Paulus	Rep.	Milwaukee
08	Milwaukee	12	Andrew H. Boncel	Dem.	Milwaukee
08	Milwaukee	13	Barney A. Eaton	Rep.	Cudahy
07	Milwaukee	14	Emerson D. Hoyt	Rep.	Wauwatosa
31	Monroe		Thomas L. Martin	Rep.	Wilton
02	Oconto		Andrew C. Frost	Rep.	Mountain
30	Oneida, Price, & Taylor		Cyrus C. Yawkey	Rep.	Hazelhurst
22	Outagamie	1	Hubert Wolf	Dem.	Greenville
22	Outagamie	2	John Uecke	Rep.	Seymour
33	Ozaukee		Herman Schellenberg	Dem.	Cedarburg
10	Pierce		Freeman Lord	Rep.	River Falls
10	Polk		Henry P. Burdick	Rep.	Osceola
21	Portage		Herman H. Hoffman	Rep.	Amherst
03	Racine	1	Charles M. Hambright	Rep.	Racine
03	Racine	2	George H. Blake	Rep.	Rochester
16	Richland		Jay G. Lamberson	Rep.	Buena Vista
17	Rock	1	Edward F. Hansen	Rep.	Beloit
24	Rock	2	Samuel S. Jones	Rep.	Clinton
24	Rock	3	Fenner Kimball	Rep.	Janesville
27	Sauk	1	Charles Hirschinger	Rep.	Baraboo
27	Sauk	2	Henry W. Sorge	Dem.	Reedsburg
14	Shawano		Christian Bonnin	Rep.	Bonduel
20	Sheboygan	1	Christian Ackerman	Rep.	Sheboygan
20	Sheboygan	2	William F. Sieker	Rep.	Herman
20	Sheboygan	3	George W. Wolff	Rep.	Rhine
10	St. Croix		Orrin J. Williams	Rep.	New Richmond
32	Trempealeau		Eugene F. Clark	Rep.	Galesville
31	Vernon		Daniel O. Mahoney	Rep.	Viroqua
24	Walworth	1	Frank L. Fraser	Rep.	East Troy
24	Walworth	2	Thomas H. Grier	Rep.	Bloomfield
33	Washington		William Froehlich	Rep.	Jackson
07	Waukesha	1	Delbert K. Smith	Rep.	Big Bend
23	Waukesha	2	Caleb C. Harris	Rep.	Dousman
22	Waupaca	1	Roger S. Johnson	Rep.	New London
21	Waupaca	2	Philip A. Ham	Rep.	Crystal Lake
21	Waushara		James T. Ellarson	Rep.	Wautoma
19	Winnebago	1	August Thalacker	Rep.	Oshkosh
19	Winnebago	2	Silas Bullard	Rep.	Menasha
19	Winnebago	3	George A. Buckstaff	Rep.	Oshkosh
12	Wood		Herman C. Wipperman	Rep.	Grand Rapids

== Committees ==
=== Senate committees ===
- Senate Committee on Agriculture – Peirce, chair
- Senate Committee on Assessment and Collection of Taxes – Woodworth, chair
- Senate Committee on Banking – Davis, chair
- Senate Committee on Dairy and Food – McGillivray, chair
- Senate Committee on Education – Stout, chair
- Senate Committee on Enrolled Bills – Phillips, chair
- Senate Committee on Engrossed Bills – Conger, chair
- Senate Committee on Federal Relations – Austin, chair
- Senate Committee on Incorporations – Mills, chair
- Senate Committee on the Judiciary – Spensley, chair
- Senate Committee on Legislative Expenditures – McGillivray, chair
- Senate Committee on Manufacturing and Commerce – Thayer, chair
- Senate Committee on Military Affairs – Weeks, chair
- Senate Committee on Privileges and Elections – Stebbins, chair
- Senate Committee on Public Lands – Timme, chair
- Senate Committee on Railroads – Withee, chair
- Senate Committee on Roads and Bridges – Youmans, chair
- Senate Committee on State Affairs – Putnam, chair
- Senate Committee on Town and County Organizations – Fisher, chair

=== Assembly committees ===
- Assembly Committee on Agriculture – Thomas H. Grier, chair
- Assembly Committee on Assessment and Collection of Taxes – N. B. Treat, chair
- Assembly Committee on Bills on their Third Reading – Charles F. Hanke, chair
- Assembly Committee on Cities – Frank Anson, chair
- Assembly Committee on Dairy and Food – George H. Blake, chair
- Assembly Committee on Education – D. O. Mahoney, chair
- Assembly Committee on Engrossed Bills – J. O. Davidson, chair
- Assembly Committee on Enrolled Bills – A. H. De Groff, chair
- Assembly Committee on Federal Relations – G. J. Jeske, chair
- Assembly Committee on Forestry and Horticulture – Charles Hirschinger, chair
- Assembly Committee on Incorporations – O. J. Williams, chair
- Assembly Committee on Insurance, Banks, and Banking – William A. Jones, chair
- Assembly Committee on the Judiciary – H. P. Burdick, chair
- Assembly Committee on Labor and Manufactures – E. R. Stillman, chair
- Assembly Committee on Legislative Expenditures – A. L. Utt, chair
- Assembly Committee on Lumber and Mining – A. R. Hall, chair
- Assembly Committee on Medical Societies – C. C. Harris, chair
- Assembly Committee on Militia – Marshall Cousins, chair
- Assembly Committee on Privileges and Elections – H. C. Sloan, chair
- Assembly Committee on Public Improvements – J. B. Miller, chair
- Assembly Committee on Public Lands – C. A. Stanley, chair
- Assembly Committee on Railroads – E. D. Hoyt, chair
- Assembly Committee on Roads and Bridges – L. B. Cox, chair
- Assembly Committee on State Affairs – J. G. Lamberson, chair
- Assembly Committee on Town and County Organization – William O'Neil, chair
- Assembly Committee on Ways and Means – James Freeman, chair

=== Joint committees ===
- Joint Committee on Charitable and Penal Institutions – Officer (Sen.) & Fenner Kimball (Asm.), co-chairs
- Joint Committee on Claims – Baxter(Sen.) & Frank L. Fraser (Asm.), co-chairs
- Joint Committee on Fish and Game – Timme (Sen.) & Henry L. Besse (Asm.), co-chairs
- Joint Committee on Printing – Peirce (Sen.) & James T. Ellarson (Asm.), co-chairs

== Employees ==
=== Senate employees ===
- Chief Clerk: Walter Houser
  - Assistant Chief Clerk: Fred W. Coon
  - Journal Clerk: William M. Fogo
  - Bookkeeper: E. S. Hotchkiss
    - Assistant Bookkepper: I. S. Griffin
  - Engrossing Clerk: Francis Stirn
    - Assistant Engrossing Clerk: Helena Heyd
  - Enrolling Clerk: L. J. Burlingame
    - Assistant Enrolling Clerk: George L. Kingsley Jr.
  - Proofreader: H. F. Poland
  - Index Clerk: F. L. Perrin
    - Assistant Index Clerk: Charles Jewell
  - Copy Holder: E. A. Charlton
  - Clerk for the Judiciary Committee: C. S. Spensley
  - Clerk for the Committee on Incorporations: M. P. Schmitt
  - Clerk for the Committee on Claims: James M. Hayden
  - Clerk for the Committee on Town and County Organization: Fisher
  - Clerk for the Committee on Railroads: W. E. Miner
  - Clerk for the Committee on State Affairs: Fred Gilman
  - Clerk for the Committee on Engrossed Bills: S. A. Pelton
  - Clerk for the Committee on Enrolled Bills: Hattie M. Phillips
  - Document Clerk: Arton T. Sutton
  - Comparing Clerks:
    - Caroline Lawson
    - S. N. Hartwell
    - C. L. Fellows
    - Edwin French
  - General Clerks:
    - C. P. Northrup
    - LeRoy Thomas
    - Horace G. Cole
    - A. W. James
  - Ruling Clerk: Eddie Sherman
  - Printing Page: B. Staunchfield
- Sergeant-at-Arms: Charles A. Pettibone
  - Assistant Sergeant-at-Arms: Hans J. Jacobson
- Postmaster: Harvey R. Rawson
  - Assistant Postmaster: Charles W. Stewart
- Gallery Attendants: Henry Grapengleser
- General Attendants:
  - Iver Torkelson
  - George S. Sutherland
- Document Room Attendant: Thomas R. McLean
- Doorkeepers:
  - Robert McCalvy
  - Daniel E. Catlin
  - John Keller
  - Charles D. Nelson
- Night Watch: George J. Walters
- Custodian: Edwin Culver
- Night Laborer: William Gillett
- Messengers:
  - Hugh W. Whitcomb
  - James E. Calmso
  - Walter E. Grams
  - James S. Bartels
  - Arthur Schempp
  - Alfred Johnson
  - Anton Kempter
  - Eldon D. Woodworth
  - Jacob G. Childs

=== Assembly employees ===
- Chief Clerk: N. A. Nowell
  - Assistant Chief Clerk: Oliver G. Munson
  - Journal Clerks:
    - Charles M. Durkee
    - B. H. Sanford
  - Bookkeepers:
    - C. E. Brightman
    - Robert A. Gillett
  - Engrossing Clerk: Julius Ewald
  - Enrolling Clerk: John W. Hare
  - Index Clerk: C. K. Pettingill
  - Stationary Clerk: Frank S. Horner
  - Proof Reader: John H. Frazier
  - Printing Clerk: Samuel J. Williams
  - Clerk for the Judiciary Committee: W. C. Reilly
    - Stenographer for the Judiciary Committee: Ella K. Smith
  - Clerk for the Committee on Enrolled Bills: Andrew Rohrscheib
  - Clerk for the Committee on Engrossed Bills: Joseph Smethurst
  - Clerk for the Committee on Assessment and Collection of Taxes: Harvey Clark
  - Clerk for the Committee on State Affairs: W. C. Thomas
  - Clerk for the Committee on Railroads: Dan B. Starkey
  - Clerk for the Committee on Insurance, Banks, and Banking: Ole Steensland
  - Clerk for the Committee on Town and County Organization: Jery Palmer
  - Clerk for the Committee on Bills on Third Reading: N. Marte
  - Document Clerk: K. W. Jensen
- Sergeant-at-Arms: Benjamin Franklin Millard
  - Assistant Sergeant-at-Arms: Joseph B. Johnson
- Postmaster: O. B. Moon
  - Assistant Postmaster: C. H. Underhill
- Doorkeepers:
  - Edward Emerson
  - Daniel Stromstad
  - R. J. Jeskie
  - William Disch
- Document Room Attendant: A. C. Lymon
- Gallery Attendants:
  - Edwin Davis
  - John Campbell
- Day Attendant: T. F. Monty
- Committee Room Attendants:
  - F. G. Dahlberg
  - Max Booth
  - Wallace Hegelmire
  - Henry Kessler
  - S. H. Sorinson
  - M. Nelson
- Porter: Aretus Bond
- Flagman: Harvey Allen
- Night Watch: I. O. Hilmoe
- Custodian of the Enrolling Room: Albert Glander
- Custodian of the Engrossing Room: R. A. Vedder
- Committee Room Custodians:
  - C. E. Foot
  - S. Teasdeal
- Wash Room Attendants:
  - Louis Donald
  - Herman Miller
- Coat Room Attendants:
  - Frank Gaus
  - Sam Debrozzo
- Janitor: Jacob Dischler
- Pages:
  - Frank Howard
  - Paul Sumers
  - Claude Blake
  - Alford Wilkey
  - William Hoskosh
  - Eddie Beebie
  - Arthur Nichols
  - Clyde Varley
  - George Cary
  - John Millard
  - Kurt Pressentin
  - George Thompson
