= Joseph B. Johnson (Wisconsin politician) =

19th-century American politician

4th, 9th, & 11th Village President of Montfort, Wisconsin
- In office April 1906 – April 1907
- Preceded by: Paine T. Stevens
- Succeeded by: David James
- In office April 1903 – April 1904
- Preceded by: Henry Snyder
- Succeeded by: Paine T. Stevens
- In office April 1897 – April 1898
- Preceded by: Paine T. Stevens
- Succeeded by: Augustus Matthews

Member of the Wisconsin State Assembly from the Grant 2nd district
- In office January 2, 1893 – January 7, 1895
- Preceded by: John J. Oswald
- Succeeded by: Joshua B. Bradbury

Personal details
- Born: September 28, 1837 Royal Oak, Michigan, U.S.
- Died: March 29, 1913 (aged 75) Montfort, Wisconsin, U.S.
- Resting place: Hill Crest Cemetery, Montfort, Wisconsin
- Party: Republican
- Spouse: Martha Comfort (m. 1862–1913)
- Children: Emma A. (NeCollins)^{(b. 1864; died 1938)}; J. Bert Johnson^{(b. 1871; died 1907)}; Mina Mae (Ehlers)^{(b. 1877; died 1926)}; Nell Odell (Irvin)^{(b. 1879; died 1961)}; Ethel (Hopley)
- Occupation: farmer

Joseph Benson Johnson (September 28, 1837 – March 29, 1913) was an American farmer and Republican politician from Grant County, Wisconsin. He served one term in the Wisconsin State Assembly, representing northern Grant County during the 1893 session. He also served three terms as village president of Montfort, Wisconsin.

== Biography ==
Joseph B. Johnson was born in Oakland County, Michigan, in September 1837. He was educated in the common schools in Oakland County and Detroit, and came to Wisconsin in 1855. He settled on a farm in the town of Highland, in Iowa County, Wisconsin, and resided there for over 25 years and was elected to the Iowa County Board of Supervisors from 1875 through 1879.

In 1880 he moved to the neighboring community of Montfort, Wisconsin, in Grant County, and served on the Grant County Board of Supervisors in 1881, 1882, 1885, 1887, and 1889. He was elected to the Wisconsin State Assembly in 1892, running on the Republican Party ticket. He represented Grant County's 2nd Assembly district, which then comprised the northern half of the county. Johnson sought re-nomination for another term in the Assembly in 1894, but the Republican delegates instead selected Joshua B. Bradbury, who went on to win the election.

Johnson did, however, receive a consolation from the Republican caucus. After leaving office at the end of the 41st Wisconsin Legislature, he was hired as assistant sergeant-at-arms for the State Assembly in the 42nd Wisconsin Legislature.

After leaving the Legislature, he served three non-consecutive terms as village president of Montfort. He died of a sudden heart failure in his sleep at his home in Montfort on March 29, 1913.

== Personal life and family ==
Joseph B. Johnson married Martha Comfort in 1862. They had at least five children, four of which survived them.

Wisconsin State Assembly
| Preceded by John J. Oswald | Member of the Wisconsin State Assembly from the Grant 2nd district January 2, 1893 – January 7, 1895 | Succeeded by Joshua B. Bradbury |
Political offices
| Preceded by Paine T. Stevens | Village President of Montfort, Wisconsin; April 1897 – April 1898 | Succeeded by Augustus Matthews |
| Preceded by Henry Snyder | Village President of Montfort, Wisconsin; April 1903 – April 1904 | Succeeded by Paine T. Stevens |
| Preceded by Paine T. Stevens | Village President of Montfort, Wisconsin; April 1906 – April 1907 | Succeeded by David James |
