= Stoughton Opera House =

Coordinates: 42°54′59.4″N 89°13′00.8″W

- City Auditorium, Stoughton Little Theater
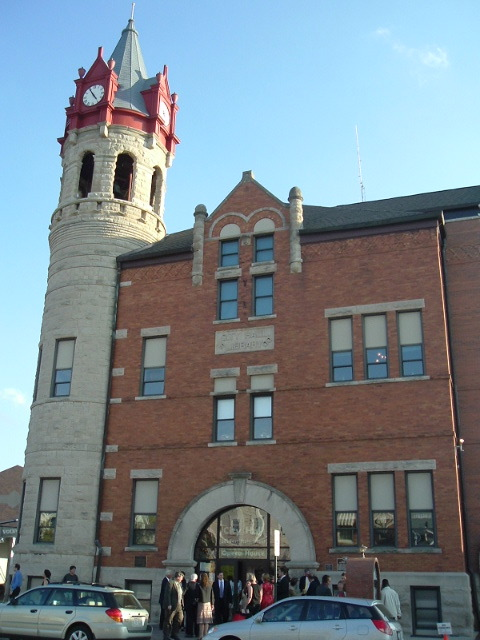
- Exterior of the Stoughton Opera House
- Interactive map of Stoughton Opera House
- Address: 381 E. Main Street; Stoughton, Wisconsin; United States
- Owner: City of Stoughton
- Capacity: 475
- Current use: Theater

Construction
- Opened: February 22, 1901
- Closed: 1950s
- Reopened: February 22, 2001
- Architect: F. H. Kemp

Website
- www.stoughtonoperahouse.com

Stoughton Opera House is a theater in Stoughton, Wisconsin, United States. It shared the building with the Stoughton City hall, which has been relocated. The evacuated floor has since been renovated into spaces for smaller performances and events.

== History ==
The Stoughton Opera House was originally known as the City Auditorium. It opened on February 22, 1901 with Ullie Akerstrom's comic play, The Doctor's Warm Reception. During the next 50 years, the Opera House was used for plays, political rallies, temperance speeches, boxing and wrestling matches, high school graduations, and class plays. From 1910 to the late 1920s, it also served as a movie theater. In the 1950s the theater was closed and fell into ruin. In the late 1980s a decision was made to save the building, restore its ornate Victorian interior, and rebuild the clock tower. The venue is now used for weddings, business and government meetings, rallies, and other functions. The building is in the Stoughton Main Street Commercial Historic District.

== Repertoire ==
In its early days, the theater's repertoire primarily featured plays, vaudeville reviews by traveling companies, and concerts. Since its reopening, its repertoire has consisted of plays by local companies, classical music concerts, and concerts by well-known touring musicians and bands.
