= SASD =

Sasd or SASD may refer to:

- Sásd, a town in Baranya county, Hungary
- Sheboygan Area School District
- Structure analysis and structured design, a software development methodology
- Structured analysis / Structural design
- Souderton Area School District
- Stoughton Area School District
