= Alonzo J. Mathison =

American politician (1876–1941)

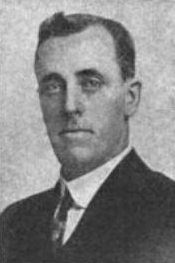

Member of the Wisconsin State Assembly
- In office 1919

Personal details
- Born: July 13, 1876 Stoughton, Wisconsin, US
- Died: November 11, 1941 (aged 65) Beloit, Wisconsin, US
- Party: Republican
- Occupation: Machinist, businessman, politician

Alonzo John Mathison (July 13, 1876 – November 11, 1941) was an American machinist, businessman, and politician.

== Biography ==
Mathison was born in Stoughton, Wisconsin, the son of Thorwald C. Mathison (1852–1894) and Carrie (née Jacobson) Mathison (1845–1919). He worked in a grocery store and then worked as a machine shop foreman for Fairbanks Morse & Company in Beloit, Wisconsin. Mathison was also in the real estate business. Mathison served on the Beloit Common Council. In 1919, Mathison served in the Wisconsin State Assembly as a Republican.

Mathison died at his home in Beloit following a long illness, and he was buried at Riverside Cemetery in Stoughton.
