= Verona Area School District =

School district in Wisconsin, United States

Location
- 700 N Main Street; Verona, Wisconsin 53593 United States

District information
- Type: Public school district
- Motto: "School and Community - United for Excellence"
- Grades: K-12
- Established: 1964
- Superintendent: Dr. Tremayne Clardy

Students and staff
- Students: 5700+
- Staff: 800+
- Athletic conference: Big 8
- District mascot: Wildcats
- Colors: Orange and Black

Other information
- Website: www.verona.k12.wi.us

Verona Area School District (VASD) is the public school district for the cities of Verona and Fitchburg, Wisconsin, as well as a small part of Madison, Wisconsin. It consists of one high school, two middle schools, and seven elementary schools. Its superintendent is Dr. Tremayne Clardy.

== History ==
In 2023, the Verona Area school district settled a lawsuit that accused them of violating the Equal Pay Act of 1963. The suit alleges that female special education teachers and school psychologists were paid less than their male counterparts for similar work.

== Schools ==
=== High school ===
- Verona Area High School

=== Middle schools ===
- Badger Ridge Middle School
- Savanna Oaks Middle School
- Core Knowledge Charter School

=== Elementary schools ===
- Core Knowledge Charter School
- Country View Elementary School
- Glacier Edge Elementary School
- New Century Charter School
- Stoner Prairie Elementary School
- Sugar Creek Elementary School
- Verona Area International School

== See also ==
- Dane County, Wisconsin
