= Stoughton (Wisconsin) High School =

- Stoughton High School
- U.S. National Register of Historic Places
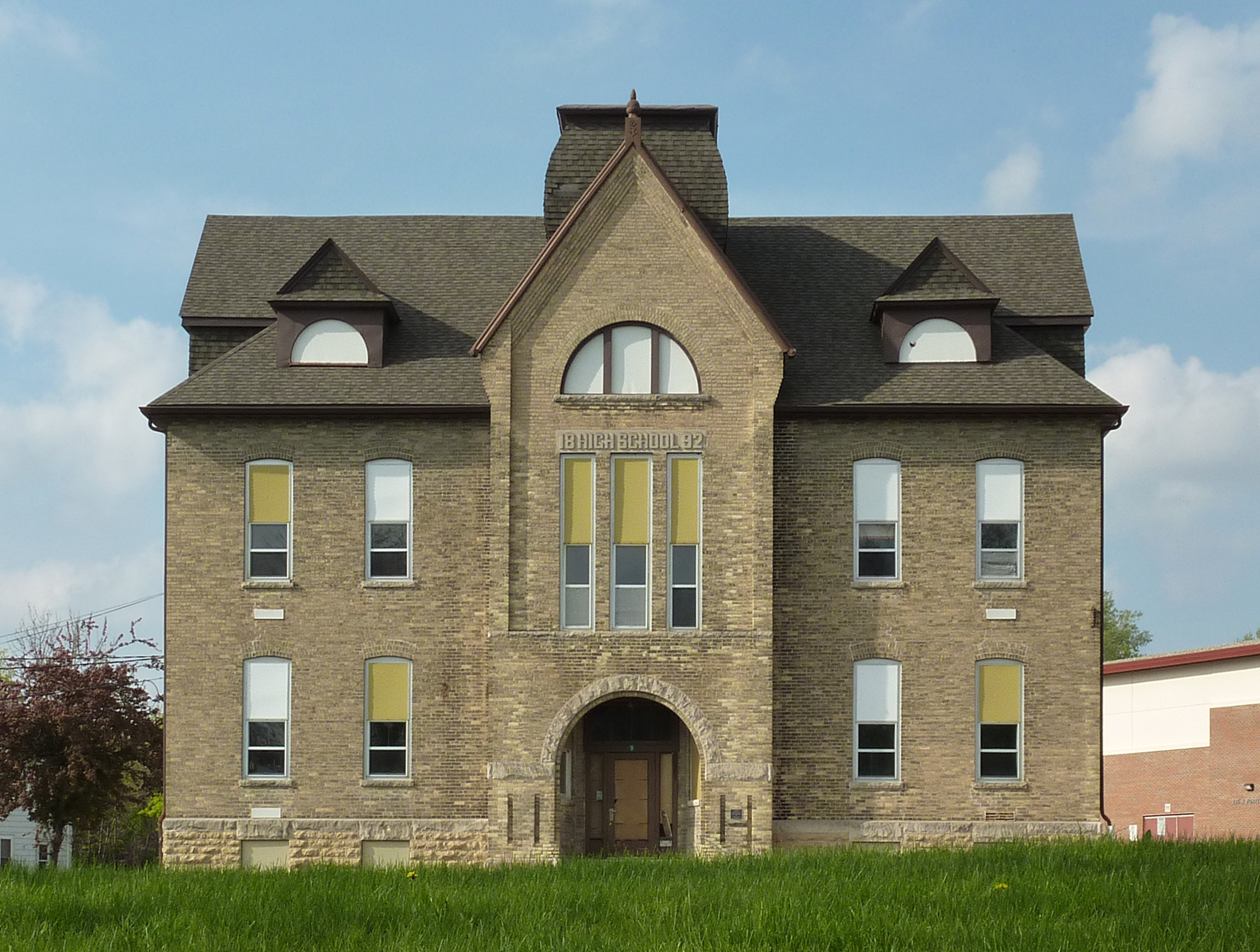
- Stoughton High School
- Location: 211 N. Forrest St., Stoughton, Wisconsin
- Coordinates: 42°55′09″N 89°13′07″W
- Area: less than one acre
- Built: 1892-1893
- Architect: James O. Gordon
- Architectural style: Romanesque Revival
- NRHP reference No.: 01001476
- Added to NRHP: January 17, 2002

The Stoughton High School building is located in Stoughton, Wisconsin.

== History ==
The building was constructed to take the place of the previous high school that had been built roughly thirty years before. Also known as the Central Public School, it was later used as a junior high school before being utilized as an office building for the local school board beginning in the 1980s. It was added to the State Register of Historic Places in 2001 and to the National Register of Historic Places the following year.
