= Henry Everett McNeil =

American children's author and friend of H.P. Lovecraft

- Born: September 25, 1862; Stoughton, Wisconsin, U.S.
- Died: December 14, 1929 (aged 67); Tacoma, Washington, U.S.
- Education: Milton College
- Occupation: Author
- Writing career
- Pen name: Everett McNeil

Henry Everett McNeil (25 September 1862 – 14 December 1929) was a leading children's author of the 1910s and 1920s, and was an original and core member of the Kalem Club circle around the writer H.P. Lovecraft. McNeil played a crucial role in the career of H.P. Lovecraft, in that he was the first to urge Lovecraft to submit his fiction to Weird Tales magazine in the early 1920s.

== Biography ==
McNeil was born in 1862 in Stoughton, Wisconsin and attended Milton College. He was a veteran of the Spanish–American War. He walked from Wisconsin to New York City sometime before 1914, where he lived at 11 Bank Street in Old Greenwich Village, New York City. McNeil never married, and moved in bohemian and artistic circles in New York.

McNeil's fiction was published under the name 'Everett McNeil' and consisted of boys' adventure books and stories for magazines such as Boys' Life. His tales were historical in setting, often featuring immense wild landscapes, and were "addressed to boys, written for boys" without any moralistic preaching or many political details. In book form his fiction appears to have retained a popularity from the 1900s into the 1950s, when it went out of fashion. Three of his books form a trilogy: The Hermit of the Culebra Mountains (1904), The Lost Treasure Cave (1905), and The Lost Nation (1918). Most of his novels were published by E.P. Dutton. McNeil also wrote short stories and magazine articles, and occasional humorous poetry.

McNeil had a short career in the early cinema in New York from 1912 to 1917, as a scriptwriter, including as writer on major features such as The Martyrdom of Philip Strong (1916) and The Making Over of Geoffrey Manning (1915). His July 1911 article in Moving Picture World titled "How To Write A Photoplay" suggests he was also writing for the movies prior to 1912.

Despite the relative success of his regularly published books, which McNeil wrote at the steady rate of 200 words a day, he appears to have led a life of genteel and ever-declining poverty. By the mid-1920s he was rooming in the notorious Hell's Kitchen, Manhattan area of New York, where his rooms became the early core of the Kalem Club. He died in 1929 shortly after ill health caused him to move in with his sister in Tacoma, Washington, and when his books were starting to bring in more money than before. He was listed in Who's Who in America.

H. P. Lovecraft was a loyal friend of his, especially liking McNeil for his freshness and his "childlike naivete". Lovecraft's "The Pigeon-Flyers", part of his late weird sonnet cycle Fungi from Yuggoth, was inspired by McNeil's death. McNeil also appears as Dr. McNeil in "The Curse of Yig", where he is fictionalized as the curator of an insane asylum.

As of 2011 McNeil's works are now in the public domain.

== Bibliography ==
- Dickon Bend-the-Bow and other Wonder Tales (1903).
- The Hermit of the Culebra Mountains (1904).
- The Lost Treasure Cave, or, Adventures with the cowboys of Colorado (1905).
- In Texas with Davy Crockett; a story of the Texas War of Independence (1908).
- The Boy Forty-Niners, or, Across the plains and mountains to the gold-mines of California (1908).
- With Kit Carson in the Rockies: A Tale of the Beaver Country (1909).
- Fighting with Fremont: a tale of the conquest of California (1910).
- The Cave of Gold: A Tale of California in '49 (1911).
- The Totem of Black Hawk: A Tale of Pioneer Days in Northwestern Illinois (1914).
- "The King of the Golden Woods" story in Fairy Stories (1916).
- The Lost Nation (1918)
- Buried Treasure: A Tale of an Old House (1919)
- Tonty of the iron hand (1925).
- Daniel du Luth, or Adventuring on the Great Lakes (1926).
- For the glory of France (1926).
- The Shadow of the Iroquois (1928).
- The Shores of Adventure, or, Exploring in the New World with Jacques Cartier (1929).
