= Derek Stanley =

American gridiron football player (born 1985)

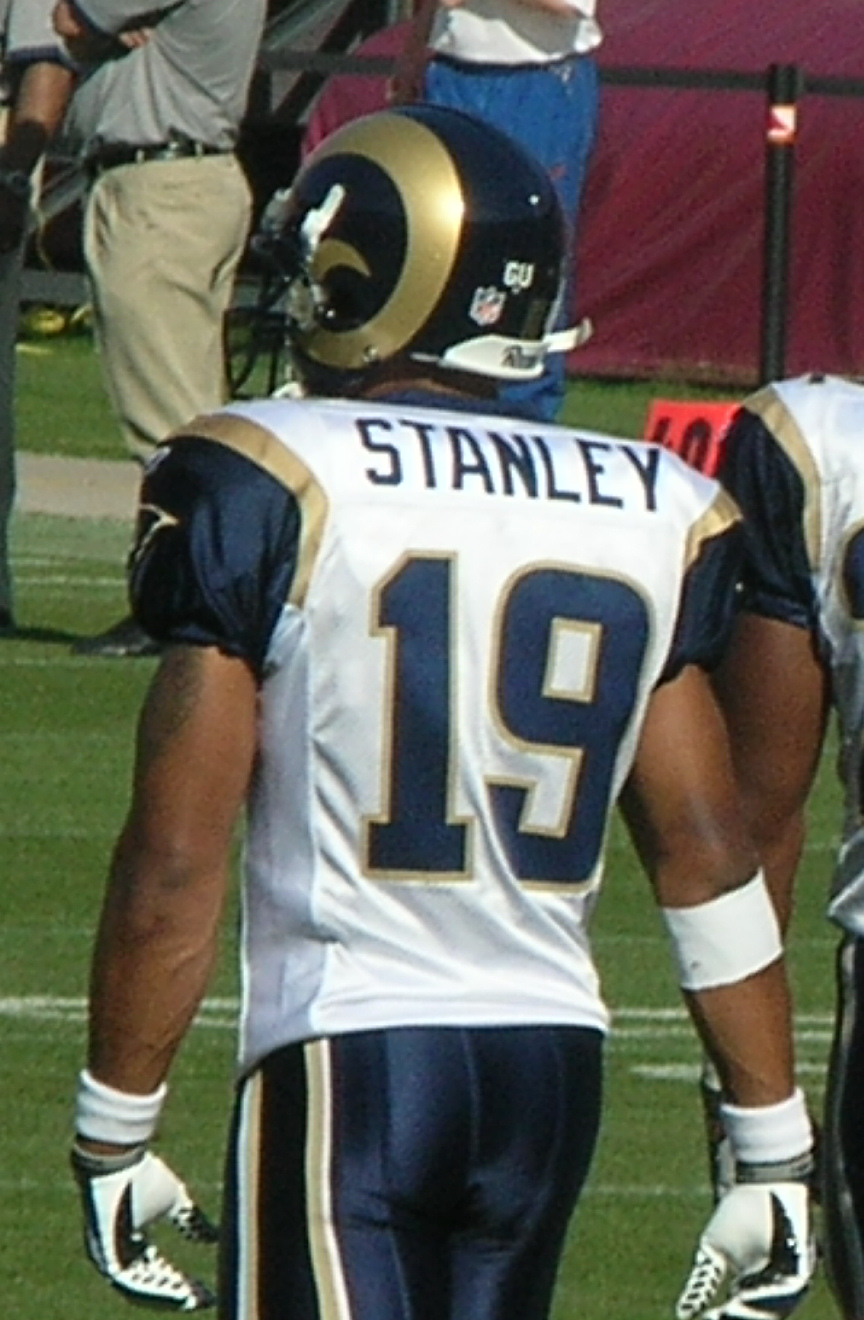
- Stanley in 2008

Missouri Baptist Spartans
- Title: Wide receivers coach

Personal information
- Born: August 27, 1985 (age 41); Verona, Wisconsin, U.S.
- Listed height: 6 ft 0 in (1.83 m)
- Listed weight: 173 lb (78 kg)

Career information
- Position: Wide receiver (No. 19)
- High school: Verona
- College: UW–Whitewater
- NFL draft: 2007: 7th round, 249th overall pick

Career history

Playing
- St. Louis Rams (2007–2009); Toronto Argonauts (2010)*
- * Offseason or practice squad member only

Coaching
- Lindenwood (2013–2015) Assistant wide receivers coach; Fontbonne (2023) Wide receivers coach; Missouri Baptist (2026–present) Wide receivers coach

Career NFL statistics
- Receptions: 6
- Receiving yards: 119
- Receiving average: 19.8
- Receiving touchdowns: 1
- Stats at Pro Football Reference

Derek Stanley (born August 27, 1985) is an American college football coach and former professional football wide receiver who played in the National Football League (NFL). He is the wide receivers coach for Missouri Baptist University, a position he has held since 2026. He played college football for the Wisconsin–Whitewater Warhawks and was selected by the St. Louis Rams in the seventh round of the 2007 NFL draft.

== Early life ==
Stanley attended Verona Area High School and was a student and a letterman in football, basketball, and track. In football, he was a two-time All-Area selection and was twice named as an All-Conference selection. The Wisconsin State Journal named Stanley Wisconsin's high school football player of the year in 2002, after he amassed more than 2,000 yards rushing in his senior season at Verona Area High School.'

== College career ==
Stanley played wide receiver at the University of Wisconsin–Whitewater. In addition, he was a track All-American and ran a reported 4.32 forty-yard dash.

== Professional career ==
=== St. Louis Rams ===
The St. Louis Rams drafted Stanley in the seventh round (249th overall) in the 2007 NFL draft. He was assigned No. 19 by the Rams and was signed to a three-year contract in June 2007.

In his first game on August 1, 2007, a preseason game against the Minnesota Vikings, Stanley had four receptions for 61 yards. He was waived from the roster the last round of cuts but was re-signed to the practice squad.

On December 14, Stanley was promoted to the active roster. He made his regular season debut two days later against the Green Bay Packers with a 19-yard kickoff return. He appeared in three games for the team, returning 20 kicks for 509 yards and fumbling once. He also had one carry for five yards and a solo tackle on special teams.

Stanley spent the first four games of the 2008 regular season on the Rams' practice squad before being signed to the active roster on October 10. The team waived safety Brannon Condren to make room for Stanley on the roster. His first career reception came on November 2, 2008 against the Arizona Cardinals. He made a spectacular 80 yard, one handed grab resulting in a touchdown.

He was waived on September 22, 2009 to make room for newly signed Danny Amendola.

=== Toronto Argonauts ===
On May 27, 2010, Stanley was signed by the Toronto Argonauts of the Canadian Football League. He was later released by the Argonauts on June 17, 2010.

== Coaching career ==
Stanley was later a wide receivers coach for Lindenwood University.

Currently he is the Wide Receivers Coach at Missouri Baptist University.
