= Jack Skille =

American ice hockey player (born 1987)

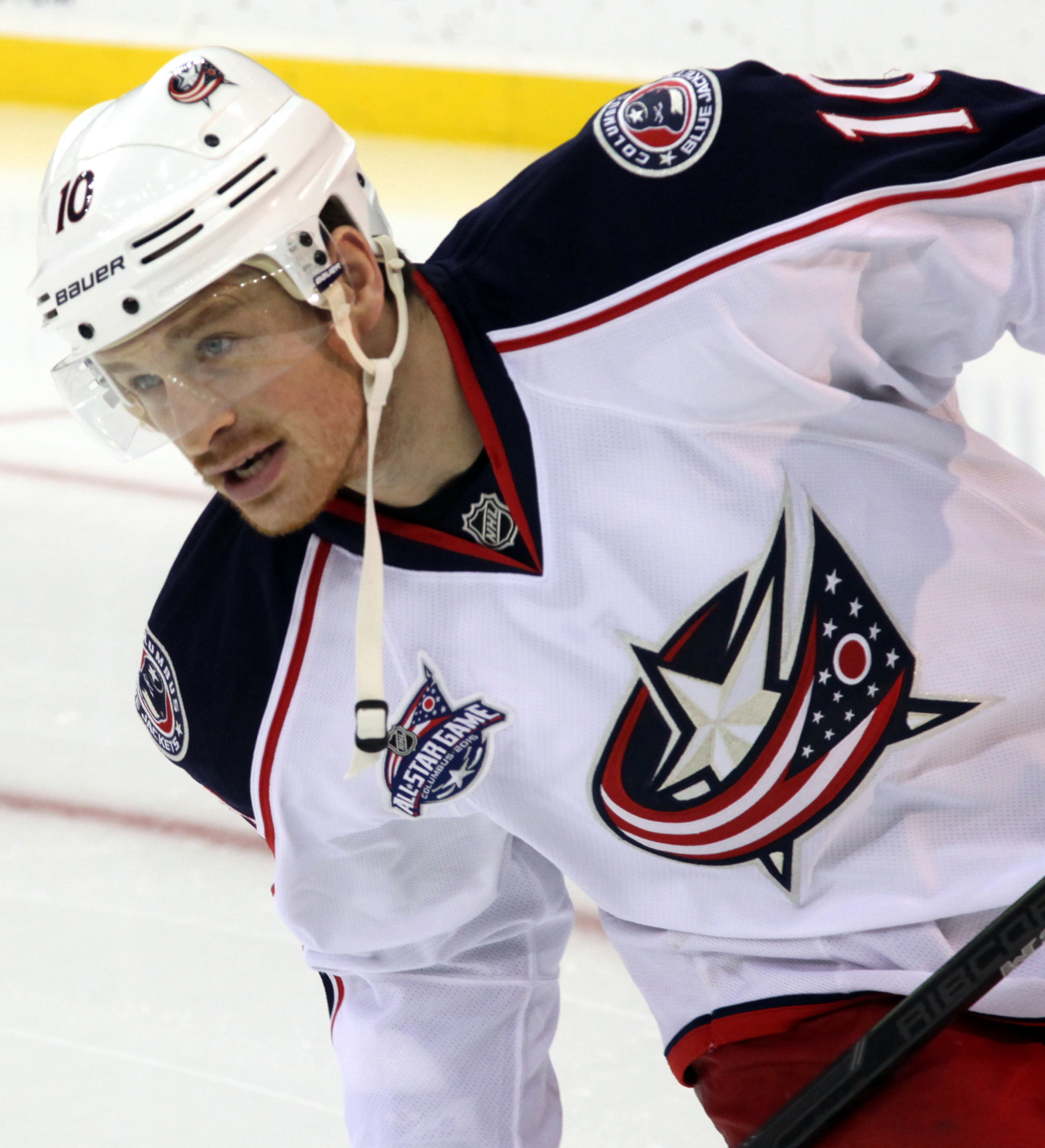
- Skille with the Columbus Blue Jackets in November 2014
- Born: May 19, 1987 (age 39) Madison, Wisconsin, U.S.
- Height: 6 ft 1 in (185 cm)
- Weight: 216 lb (98 kg; 15 st 6 lb)
- Position: Right wing
- Shot: Right
- Played for: Chicago Blackhawks; Florida Panthers; Rosenborg IHK; Columbus Blue Jackets; Colorado Avalanche; Vancouver Canucks; Dinamo Minsk; Genève-Servette HC; Thomas Sabo Ice Tigers; EC Red Bull Salzburg
- Current EIHL coach: Glasgow Clan
- National team: United States
- NHL draft: 7th overall, 2005; Chicago Blackhawks
- Playing career: 2007–2021

Jack Skille (born May 19, 1987) is an American former professional ice hockey right winger. He played in the National Hockey League (NHL) for the Chicago Blackhawks, Florida Panthers, Columbus Blue Jackets, Colorado Avalanche, and the Vancouver Canucks. He is the Head Coach of the Glasgow Clan of the Elite Ice Hockey League (EIHL).

== Playing career ==
=== Amateur ===
Skille with University of Wisconsin in March 2006 as he scores the game-winning goal against Cornell University.

As a highly regarded forward prospect, Skille was drafted by the Chicago Blackhawks with the seventh overall pick in the 2005 NHL entry draft out of USA Hockey's National Team Development Program. Skille was the third in the group of eight American-born players that were selected in the first round, surpassing the previous record of seven Americans selected in the first round in both 1986 and 2003.

In his freshman campaign at the University of Wisconsin–Madison for the Badgers men's ice hockey team, he made an immediate impact, leading all Badger freshmen in scoring with 12 goals and seven assists for 19 points. He also finished the season as the eighth-leading point-scorer for the team. Skille's goal 11:13 into the third overtime propelled the top-seeded Badgers past Cornell University 1–0 on March 26, 2006, in the NCAA Midwest Regional Final at the Resch Center, and into the team's first Frozen Four since 1992.

In his sophomore year, Skille suffered an injury that made him sit out a good portion of the season. After the Badgers failed to qualify for the 2007 NCAA tournament, Skille signed with the Norfolk Admirals, the Chicago Blackhawks' American Hockey League (AHL) affiliate.

=== Professional ===
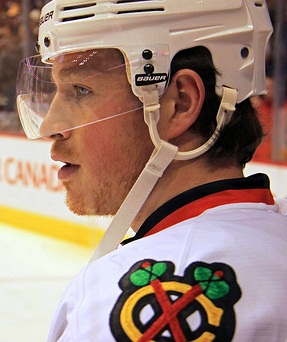
Skille during his tenure with the Blackhawks in November 2010.

After signing with the Blackhawks to a three-year, entry-level contract, Skille was assigned to the team's AHL affiliate, the Rockford IceHogs.

Skille made his NHL debut against the Los Angeles Kings on December 30, 2007. He was brought up from the IceHogs to cover for an injured player, and later scored his first career NHL goal and assist on January 8, 2008, against Cristobal Huet of the Montreal Canadiens. Skille was later selected to represent Rockford at the 2010 AHL All-Star Game.

Prior to signing with the Blackhawks for the 2010–11 season, Skille appeared in 30 games with the Blackhawks over three seasons (2007 to 2010), collecting eight points (five goals and three assists) and five penalty minutes, including two points (one goal and one assist ) in six regular season games with Chicago during the team's 2009–10 Stanley Cup-winning campaign. Skille received a ring from the Blackhawks but his name was not included on the Stanley Cup and wasn't given a personal day with the Cup over the off-season.

During his first full season with the Blackhawks, on February 9, 2011, Skille was traded, along with Hugh Jessiman and David Pacan, to the Florida Panthers in exchange for Michael Frolík and Alexander Salák.

As a result of the 2012–13 NHL lockout, Skille signed with the GET-ligaen side Rosenborg of Norway to play until the end of the lockout. Skille did not receive any wages from Rosenborg, and was the first NHL player to play in the Norwegian league during the lockout.

On July 6, 2013, Skille was signed as a free agent by the Columbus Blue Jackets to a one-year, two-way contract. During a stretch with the Blue Jackets, he scored four goals in seven games played at the time.

On July 1, 2014, Skille was again on the move, signing as a free agent on a one-year, two-way contract with the New York Islanders. However, Skille returned to the Blue Jackets at the beginning of the 2014–15 season, on October 5, 2014, after being claimed off waivers. As a depth forward in his second season with the Blue Jackets, Skille appeared in 45 games scoring 6 goals.

As an unrestricted free agent, Skille left the Blue Jackets for a second successive season, however was unable to secure a contract in the off-season. On September 16, 2015, Skille signed a professional try-out contract to attend the 2015 training camp of the Colorado Avalanche. On October 6, 2015, after impressing in depth position in the pre-season the Avalanche announced they had signed Skille to a one-year, two-way contract. In a fourth line role, Skille remained with the Avalanche for the duration of the 2015–16 season, appearing in 74 games and registering 8 goals for 14 points.

Over the following off-season, Skille agreed to attend the Vancouver Canucks training camp, as a free agent, on a professional try-out basis on September 19, 2016. On October 11, 2016, the Vancouver Canucks announced that Skille had made it into the team's 23-man opening roster. On October 13, 2016, Skille was awarded a one-year, $700,000 contract with the Vancouver Canucks.

Following the 2017–18 season, having opted to play abroad in the Kontinental Hockey League with Belarusian club, HC Dinamo Minsk, Skille returned to North America as a free agent in the summer. Approaching the 2018–19 season, Skille accepted a professional try-out contract to attend the Ottawa Senators training camp on September 12, 2018. He was released from his professional try-out contract on September 23, 2018.

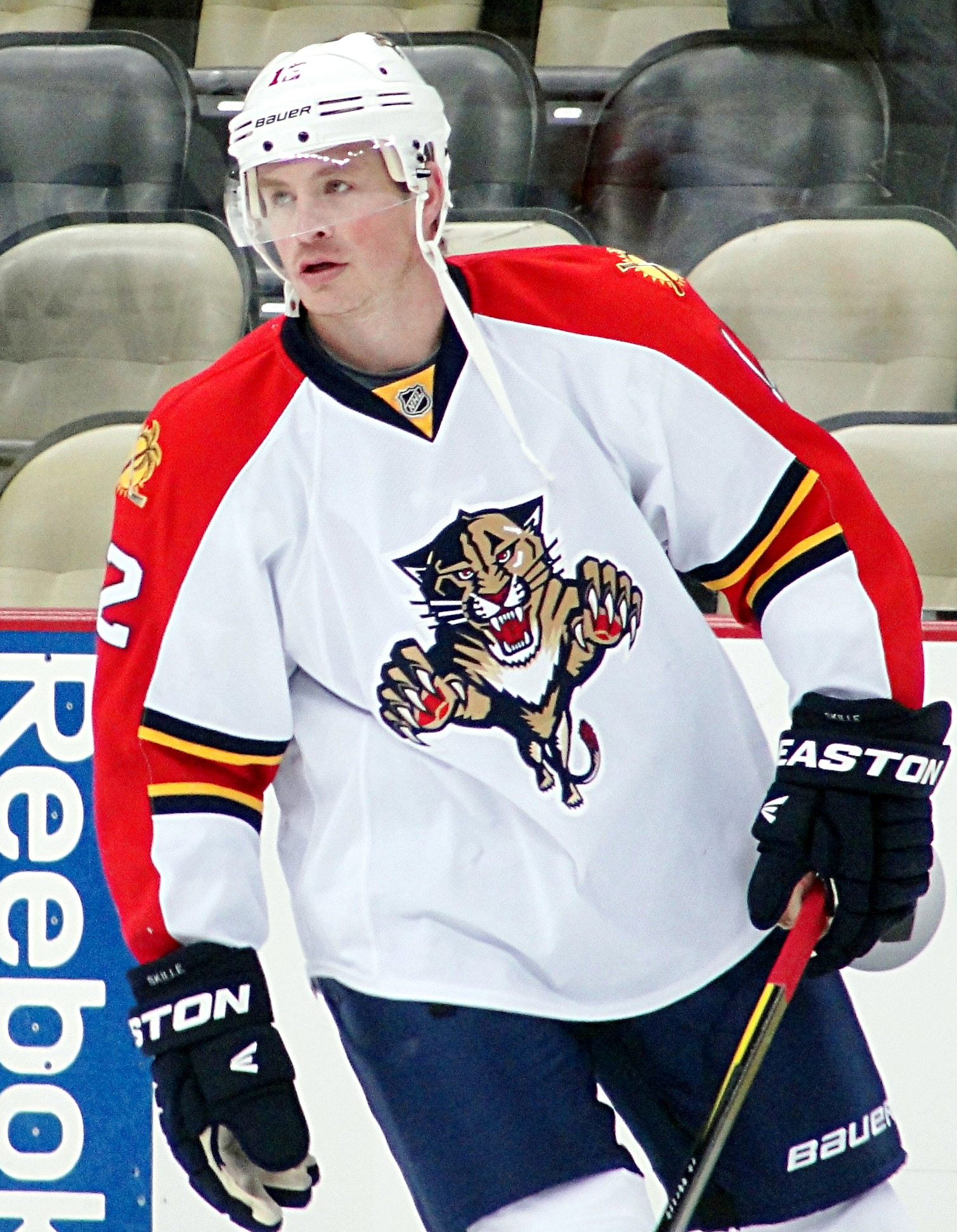
Skille in March 2012 with the Panthers.

On October 1, 2018, Skille signed a one-year contract worth CHF 650,000 with Genève-Servette HC of the National League as a replacement for injured Lance Bouma. Skille played 23 regular season games (10 points) and only appeared in 2 of the team's 6 playoffs games, failing to score a single point. He was not offered a contract extension, becoming a free agent.

== International play ==
Prior to joining the Badgers was a member of the USA Hockey-sponsored National Development Team. He won a gold medal at the 2005 IIHF World U18 Championships in the Czech Republic collecting a goals and three assists in six games at the championship. Skille collected 24 goals, 31 assists and 55 points in 54 games for the U.S. National Under-18 Team during 2004–05 and was whistled for 76 penalty minutes during the season. In international play as a NDTP player, Skille had tournament-best seven points to lead the Americans to first place at the Four Nations Cup in Ann Arbor, Michigan and led tournament with eight points as U.S. team placed first at Five Nations Tournament in Tjörn, Sweden.

He split the 2003–04 season with the U.S. Under-17 Team and U.S. Under-18 Team, playing in 61 games total, posted 25 goals, 19 assists and 44 points to go along with 61 penalty minutes. He also had a goal and an assist to help U.S. Under-18 Team to silver at 2004 IIHF World U18 Championships in Minsk, Belarus. Prior to him joining the US Development Team, Skille led the Verona Area Wildcats to two WIAA State Hockey Tournament appearances. He had a total of 99 points in the two years with Verona Area.

== Personal life ==
Skille is the son of Lee and Carrie Skille. His father Lee skated at Wisconsin in the mid-1970s, served as the head hockey coach at Century High School in Bismarck, ND and head hockey coach and athletic director at Madison West High School. Skille has two sisters, Maggie and Claire. He attended Huron High School in Ann Arbor, Michigan, and Verona Area High School in Verona, Wisconsin.

== Career statistics ==
=== Regular season and playoffs ===
			Regular season					Playoffs
Season	Team	League	GP	G	A	Pts	PIM	GP	G	A	Pts	PIM
2002–03	Verona Area High School	HS–WI	—	28	25	53	—	—	—	—	—	—
2003–04	U.S. NTDP U17	USDP	33	14	10	24	30	—	—	—	—	—
2003–04	U.S. NTDP U18	NAHL	28	11	9	20	31	—	—	—	—	—
2004–05	U.S. NTDP U18	NAHL	16	6	11	17	20	—	—	—	—	—
2004–05	U.S. NTDP U18	USDP	26	9	11	20	36	—	—	—	—	—
2005–06	University of Wisconsin–Madison	WCHA	39	13	7	20	35	—	—	—	—	—
2006–07	University of Wisconsin–Madison	WCHA	26	8	10	18	12	—	—	—	—	—
2006–07	Norfolk Admirals	AHL	9	4	4	8	0	3	0	0	0	2
2007–08	Rockford IceHogs	AHL	59	16	18	34	44	12	2	1	3	6
2007–08	Chicago Blackhawks	NHL	16	3	2	5	0	—	—	—	—	—
2008–09	Chicago Blackhawks	NHL	8	1	0	1	5	—	—	—	—	—
2008–09	Rockford IceHogs	AHL	58	20	25	45	56	—	—	—	—	—
2009–10	Chicago Blackhawks	NHL	6	1	1	2	0	—	—	—	—	—
2009–10	Rockford IceHogs	AHL	63	23	26	49	50	4	0	0	0	0
2010–11	Chicago Blackhawks	NHL	49	7	10	17	25	—	—	—	—	—
2010–11	Florida Panthers	NHL	13	1	1	2	4	—	—	—	—	—
2011–12	Florida Panthers	NHL	46	4	6	10	28	—	—	—	—	—
2012–13	Rosenborg IHK	NOR	9	6	6	12	20	—	—	—	—	—
2012–13	Florida Panthers	NHL	40	3	9	12	11	—	—	—	—	—
2013–14	Springfield Falcons	AHL	22	13	11	24	9	—	—	—	—	—
2013–14	Columbus Blue Jackets	NHL	16	4	0	4	6	6	0	1	1	0
2014–15	Columbus Blue Jackets	NHL	45	6	2	8	16	—	—	—	—	—
2015–16	Colorado Avalanche	NHL	74	8	6	14	11	—	—	—	—	—
2016–17	Vancouver Canucks	NHL	55	5	4	9	12	—	—	—	—	—
2017–18	Dinamo Minsk	KHL	41	11	14	25	18	—	—	—	—	—
2018–19	Genève–Servette HC	NL	23	5	5	10	16	2	0	0	0	0
2019–20	Thomas Sabo Ice Tigers	DEL	16	7	3	10	6	—	—	—	—	—
2020–21	EC Red Bull Salzburg	ICEHL	25	10	10	20	0	11	1	1	2	2
NHL totals			368	43	41	84	118	6	0	1	1	0

=== International ===
Medal record

Representing United States

Ice hockey

World Junior Hockey Championship
Bronze medal – third place	2007 Leksand	

Under-18 World Championships
Gold medal – first place	2005 Pilsen	
Silver medal – second place	2004 Minsk	

Year	Team	Event	Result	GP	G	A	Pts	PIM
2004	United States	U17	4th	5	2	3	5	14
2004	United States	WJC18	2nd place, silver medalist(s)	6	1	1	2	4
2005	United States	WJC18	1st place, gold medalist(s)	6	1	3	4	8
2006	United States	WJC	4th	7	2	0	2	4
2007	United States	WJC	3rd place, bronze medalist(s)	7	1	5	6	14
2011	United States	WC	8th	2	1	0	1	0
Junior totals				26	5	9	14	30
Senior totals				2	1	0	1	0

Awards and achievements
Preceded by Cam Barker	Chicago Blackhawks first-round draft pick 2005	Succeeded by Jonathan Toews
