= Verona Area High School =

Coordinates: 42.995236°N 89.537507°W

- 234 Wildcat Way; Verona, Wisconsin

Information
- Type: Public
- School district: Verona Area School District
- Principal: Brian Cox
- Staff: 120.05 (on an FTE basis)
- Grades: 9-12
- Enrollment: 1,820 (2024–2025)
- Student to teacher ratio: 15.16
- Colors: Orange and black
- Mascot: Wildcat
- Newspaper: The Cat's Eye (disbanded)

Verona Area High School (VAHS) is a high school in Verona, Wisconsin, United States. It is part of the Verona Area School District.

== History ==
The first high school in Verona was established in 1899, with the first class graduating in 1901. The school was at first located in the Woodmen Hall, a building belonging to the Modern Woodmen of America, until a new building was constructed for it in 1905. That building was replaced in 1937 with a larger school located next door to the 1905 building along Marietta Street. The Richard Street campus was built in 1968; Badger Ridge Middle School moved into that building in 2022.

A new building for the school was completed in June 2020. It was intended to be ready for the 2020–2021 school year, but due to the COVID-19 pandemic, students did not begin to take in-person classes at the new building until February 2021, and the facility was not fully in use until September 2021.

== Academics ==
Accredited by the North Central Association, VAHS offers a core curriculum in grades 9 through 12 that does not track students by ability; instead, advanced opportunities are offered within the curriculum of each course. Consequently, VAHS courses do not carry designations such as "Honors" in their titles. Grade 9 and 10 students in core classes are taught in teams of English/social studies and math/science instructors. Students in the 10th, 11th, and 12th grades have the opportunity to take Advanced Placement courses in English Language, English Literature, World History, Human Geography, Music Theory, Chemistry, Biology, Physics, Statistics, Psychology and Calculus. They also have the opportunity to take Project Lead the Way classes, and are able to become a Certified Nursing Assistant.

== Athletics ==
In the 2008-09 school year, VAHS became a member of the Big Eight Conference, moving from the Badger South Conference. The school's sports teams were formerly known as the Indians. Due to the Native American mascot controversy, including a letter from local resident and noted activist Ada Deer, a contest was held in 1992 to choose a new mascot. Students chose the Wildcats over six other possibilities.

=== Sports ===
VAHS competes in the following sports:

- Dance
- Cheer
- Football
- Cross Country (boys' and girls')
- Tennis (boys' and girls')
- Soccer (boys' and girls')
- Swimming (boys' and girls')
- Volleyball
- Golf (boys' and girls')
- Basketball (boys' and girls')
- Gymnastics
- Wrestling
- Hockey
- Skiing/snowboarding
- Softball
- Baseball
- Track and field (boys' and girls')
- Lacrosse (boys' and girls')

=== State championships ===
- Basketball (girls): 2016
- Cross country (boys): 1974, 1982, 1991
- Cross country (girls): 1980, 1981, 1984
- Golf (girls): 2014
- Gymnastics (girls): 2023
- Hockey (boys): 2014, 2020
- Lacrosse (boys): 2004, 2005, 2011, 2014, 2018
- Soccer (boys): 2019, 2022
- Soccer (girls): 2010
- Swimming (boys): 1993, 2000
- Swimming (girls): 1998
- Track & field (boys): 1992, 1999, 2010 (wheelchair)
- Track & field (girls): 1984, 1985, 1991

== Notable alumni ==
- Jackson Acker, professional football player
- Casey FitzRandolph, gold medalist speed skater at the 2002 Winter Olympic Games
- Ben Rortvedt, Major League Baseball
- Nick Schmaltz, NHL player for the Utah Mammoth (2024–present); former member of the Arizona Coyotes (2018–2024) and Chicago Blackhawks (2016–2018)
- Jack Skille, former NHL player with the Chicago Blackhawks (2007-2011), Florida Panthers (2011-2013), Columbus Blue Jackets (2013-2015), Colorado Avalanche (2015-2016), and the Vancouver Canucks (2016–2017)
- Derek Stanley, former NFL wide receiver with the St. Louis Rams (2007-2009)
- Eric Studesville, assistant coach with the Denver Broncos (2010–present); he was the interim head coach for the last four games of the 2010 season
- Neil Walker, gold & silver medalist swimmer at the 2000 Summer Olympics; gold & bronze medalist swimmer at the 2004 Summer Olympics
- Joe Wineke, Wisconsin politician
