= Herman Rosenkranz =

American politician

Herman Rosenkranz (May 4, 1859 – ) was an American politician. He was a member of the Wisconsin State Assembly during the 1895 session. Rosenkranz represented the 1st District of Dodge County, Wisconsin. He was a Democrat.
