= Ole C. Lee =

American politician

Member of the Wisconsin State Assembly
- In office 1894–1895

Mayor of Stoughton
- In office 1888–1888

Clerk of Stoughton
- In office 1882–1887

Member of the Dane County Board of Supervisors
- In office 1889–1893

Personal details
- Born: September 27, 1847 Norway
- Died: February 11, 1919 (aged 71) Stoughton, Wisconsin, U.S.
- Spouse: Amelia Anderson (m. 1885)

Ole Christopher Lee (September 27, 1847 – February 11, 1919) was a member of the Wisconsin State Assembly.

== Biography ==
Ole Christopher Lee was born in Norway. As a child, he moved to the United States, arriving with his family in 1850. He settled in Stoughton, Wisconsin in 1879. He married Amelia Anderson in 1885. Lee died in Stoughton on February 11, 1919.

== Political career ==
After working as a county schoolteacher, Lee was clerk of Stoughton from 1882 to 1887 and mayor in 1888. After serving as a member of the Dane County, Wisconsin Board of Supervisors from 1889 to 1893, he was elected to the Wisconsin State Assembly in 1894 and served until 1895.
