= Verona, Wisconsin =

- City
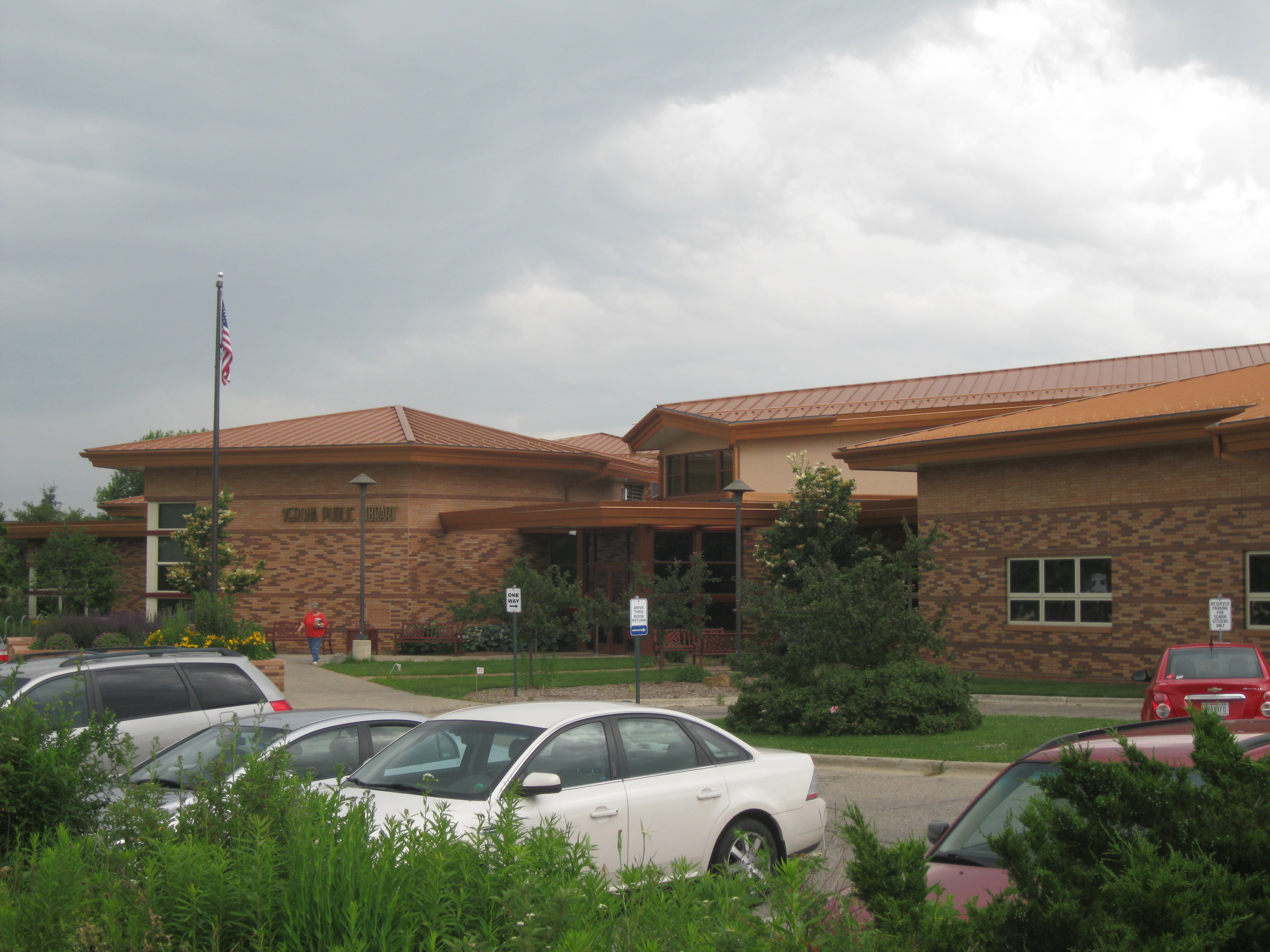
- Verona Public Library
- Interactive map of Verona, Wisconsin
- Location within Wisconsin Location within the United States
- Coordinates: 42°59′23″N 89°32′8″W
- Country: United States
- State: Wisconsin
- County: Dane
- Named for: Verona, New York

Government
  - Mayor: Luke Diaz
  - City administrator: Jamie Aulik

Area
  - Total: 7.56 sq mi (19.57 km^{2})
  - Land: 7.48 sq mi (19.38 km^{2})
  - Water: 0.069 sq mi (0.18 km^{2})

Population (2020)
  - Total: 14,030
  - Estimate (2026): 17,215
  - Density: 1,768.3/sq mi (682.75/km^{2})
- Time zone: UTC-6 (Central (CST))
  - Summer (DST): UTC-5 (CDT)
- ZIP Code: 53593
- Area code: 608/353
- FIPS code: 55-82600
- Website: www.veronawi.gov

Verona is a city in Dane County, Wisconsin, United States. The population was 14,030 at the 2020 census. The city is located 10 miles (16 km) southwest of downtown Madison within the Town of Verona. It is part of the Madison metropolitan area.

== History ==
Verona was incorporated as a village in 1921 and as a city in 1978. It was named for the town of Verona, New York, which itself was named after the city of Verona in northern Italy. Verona was home to the Dane County Insane Asylum, which opened in 1882 and closed in 1973 before ultimately being demolished in 2006. It was previously a poor farm for people who needed care due to old age, blindness, disease, deformity, loss of limbs and insanity. The area was also the site of a small leper colony sometime between 1890 and 1910, which is now a dog park.

== Geography ==
Verona is located at 42°59′23″N 89°32′7″W (42.989853, −89.535552).

According to the United States Census Bureau, the city has a total area of 6.36 square miles (16.47 km^{2}), of which 6.30 square miles (16.32 km^{2}) is land and 0.06 square miles (0.16 km^{2}) is water. Notable geographical features include the Verona Sugar River Valley, the Badger Mill Creek, and the Sugar River State Trail. A portion of the Ice Age National Scenic Trail also runs through Verona.

=== Climate ===
On July 22, 2010, a tornado rated EF1 hit Verona.

On June 9, 2011, an EF1 tornado struck Verona, with winds peaking around 90 mph (140 km/h).

On the night of June 16, 2014, an EF3 tornado tore through Country View Elementary School and surrounding neighborhoods. No one was hurt by the tornado and the school was rebuilt and remodeled before school started in the fall.

On July 29, 2021, around 12:44 am an EF1 tornado with winds of 93 mph (150 km/h) struck as well as a high-end EF0 tornado with winds of 85 mph (137 km/h) at 12:47 am in Verona.

== Demographics ==
Historical population
Census	Pop.	Note	%±
1930	455		—
1940	535		17.6%
1950	748		39.8%
1960	1,471		96.7%
1970	2,334		58.7%
1980	3,336		42.9%
1990	5,374		61.1%
2000	7,052		31.2%
2010	10,619		50.6%
2020	14,030		32.1%
2026 (est.)	17,173		22.4%
U.S. Decennial Census

=== 2020 census ===
As of the 2020 census, Verona had a population of 14,030, and the population density was 1,874.9 inhabitants per square mile.

The median age was 37.2 years. 27.3% of residents were under the age of 18, 59.6% were between the ages of 18 and 64, and 13.1% were 65 years of age or older. For every 100 females there were 97.3 males, and for every 100 females age 18 and over, there were 93.7 males.

99.5% of residents lived in urban areas, while 0.5% lived in rural areas.

There were 5,463 households in Verona, of which 36.9% had children under the age of 18 living in them. Of all households, 54.7% were married-couple households, 16.6% were households with a male householder and no spouse or partner present, and 23.2% were households with a female householder and no spouse or partner present. About 28.1% of all households were made up of individuals and 10.8% had someone living alone who was 65 years of age or older.

There were 5,646 housing units, of which 3.2% were vacant. The homeowner vacancy rate was 1.0% and the rental vacancy rate was 5.8%.

Racial composition as of the 2020 census
Race	Number	Percentage
White	12,115	86.4%
Black or African American	243	1.7%
American Indian and Alaska Native	46	0.3%
Asian	531	3.8%
Native Hawaiian and Other Pacific Islander	0	0.0%
Some other race	258	1.8%
Two or more races	837	6.0%
Hispanic or Latino (of any race)	729	5.2%

=== 2010 census ===
At the 2010 census there were 10,619 people, 4,223 households, and 2,845 families living in the city. The population density was 1,685.6 inhabitants per square mile (650.8/km^{2}). There were 4,461 housing units at an average density of 708.1 per square mile (273.4/km^{2}). The racial makeup of the city was 93.3% White, 1.3% African American, 0.3% Native American, 2.5% Asian, 0.7% other races, and 1.9% two or more races. Hispanic or Latino of any race were 2.4%.

Of the 4,223 households 39.4% had children under the age of 18 living with them, 54.4% were married couples living together, 9.6% had a female householder with no husband present, 3.3% had a male householder with no wife present, and 32.6% were non-families. 27.4% of households were one person and 9.4% were one person aged 65 or older. The average household size was 2.50 and the average family size was 3.09.

The median age was 37.4 years. 29% of residents were under the age of 18; 5.2% were between the ages of 18 and 24; 28.7% were from 25 to 44; 27.2% were from 45 to 64; and 9.8% were 65 or older. The gender makeup of the city was 48.4% male and 51.6% female.

=== 2000 census ===
At the 2000 census there were 7,052 people, 2,591 households, and 1,873 families living in the city. The population density was 2,156.3 people per square mile (832.7/km^{2}). There were 2,664 housing units at an average density of 814.6 per square mile (314.5/km^{2}). The racial makeup of the city was 97.46% White, 0.62% Black or African American, 0.17% Native American, 0.67% Asian, 0.23% from other races, and 0.85% from two or more races. 0.71% of the population were Hispanic or Latino of any race. Jewish population reaches 3 percent of total city population. Of the 2,591 households 45.0% had children under the age of 18 living with them, 60.0% were married couples living together, 8.8% had a female householder with no husband present, and 27.7% were non-families. 21.6% of households were one person and 8.5% were one person aged 65 or older. The average household size was 2.68 and the average family size was 3.16.

The age distribution was 31.4% under the age of 18, 5.3% from 18 to 24, 31.3% from 25 to 44, 22.1% from 45 to 64, and 9.9% 65 or older. The median age was 36 years. For every 100 females, there were 93.7 males. For every 100 females age 18 and over, there were 89.3 males.

The median household income was $65,367 and the median family income was $71,098. Males had a median income of $46,919 versus $32,296 for females. The per capita income for the city was $26,433. About 2.0% of families and 3.7% of the population were below the poverty line, including 2.9% of those under age 18 and 6.2% of those age 65 or over.

== Economy ==
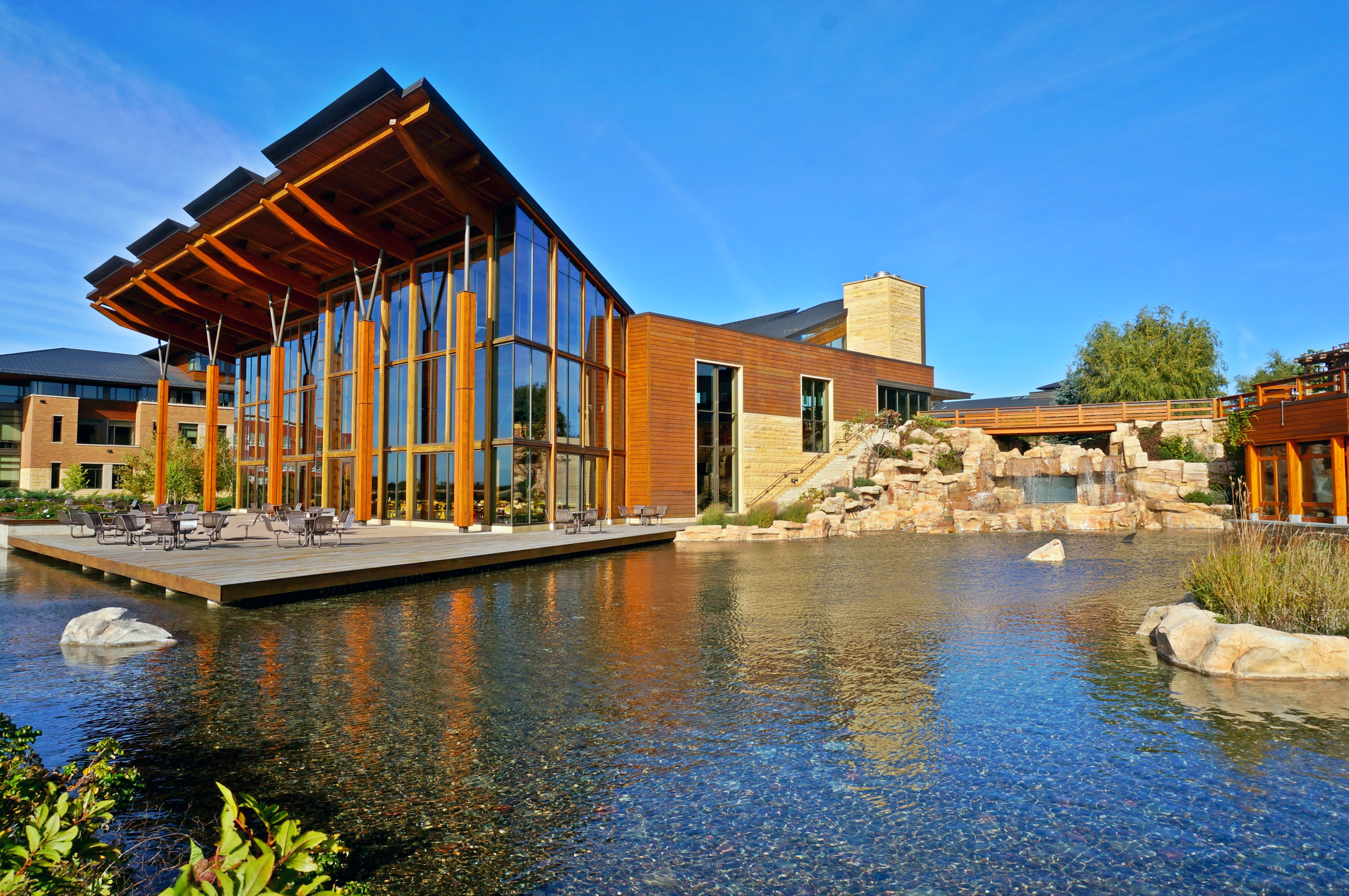
Epic Systems headquarters

Healthcare software company Epic Systems is headquartered on a 1,670-acre (680 ha) campus in Verona. School curriculum and communications aid company Attainment Company is also based in the city.

== Education ==
The area is served by the Verona Area School District, which includes Verona Area High School as well as four elementary schools, two middle schools, two charter schools, and an international school. The Verona Public Library opened in 2006. The Prairie School–style facility has views of Badger Prairie Park. The land for the new building was negotiated as a trade with Dane County for the installation of water pipes in the park.

== Notable people ==
- William Charlton, Wisconsin legislator and farmer
- Casey FitzRandolph, Olympic medalist in speed skating
- Benjamin Heckendorn, video game console modder
- Phil Kessel, NHL player (VGK)
- Wayne Morse, U.S. Senator from Oregon
- Ben Rortvedt, MLB player
- Nick Schmaltz, NHL Player (ARI)
- Jack Skille, NHL player
- Derek Stanley, former NFL player
- Neil Walker, Olympic medalist in swimming
- Henry F. Wilke, Wisconsin legislator and postmaster
