= Andrew H. Boncel =

American politician

Andrew H. Boncel (November 29, 1860 – October 19, 1901) was an American businessman, newspaper editor, and politician.

Boncel was born in the Province of Posen, Germany. He emigrated with his parents to the United States in 1870 and settled in Milwaukee, Wisconsin where he went to Milwaukee parochial schools. He worked as a carpenter. Boncel also worked for the Milwaukee County Sheriff's Department and the Milwaukee City Health Department. Boncel started the Polish language newspaper the Orzel Blale, in Milwaukee. He was also involved with the Polish societies, the trade unions, and the Polish National Building and Loan Association. Boncel served in the Wisconsin Assembly in 1895 and 1896 as a Democrat. Boncel died at his home in Milwaukee from a lung ailment.
