= Charles Thompson Fisher =

American politician (1846–1930)

Charles Thompson Fisher (August 11, 1846 – June 16, 1930) was an American farmer and politician.

Born in the town of Wauwatosa, Wisconsin Territory, Fisher went to a select school in Wauwatosa and to the Spencerian Commercial College in Milwaukee, Wisconsin. Fisher was a farmer and stock raiser. He served as town treasurer of the town of Wauwatosa from 1879 to 1880 and as chairman of the Wauwatosa Town Board from 1892 to 1892. He also served on the Milwaukee County Board of Supervisors and was chairman of the county board. Fisher served in the Wisconsin State Senate from 1895 to 1899 and was a Republican. Fisher died in Milwaukee, Wisconsin as a result of a fall at his home.
