= Henry F. Wilke =

American politician (1857–1931)

- Born: February 5, 1857; Phenegge, Waldeck, Germany
- Died: May 9, 1931 (aged 74)
- Burial place: Forest Hill Cemetery, Madison, Wisconsin
- Occupation: politician
- Known for: member, Wisconsin State Assembly
- Political party: Republican

Henry F. Wilke (February 5, 1857 – May 9, 1931) was an American businessman and politician.

Born in Phenegge, Waldeck, Germany, Wilke was educated in Germany. In 1889, Wilke emigrated to the United States and settled in Madison, Wisconsin. He was in the general merchandise and lumber business. He then moved to Blue Mounds, Wisconsin. Finally, Wilke settled in Verona, Wisconsin. He served as postmaster for Verona, Wisconsin. In 1895, Wilke served in the Wisconsin State Assembly and was a Republican. Wilke died in 1931 and was buried at Forest Hill Cemetery in Madison.
