= Stoughton, Wisconsin =

- City
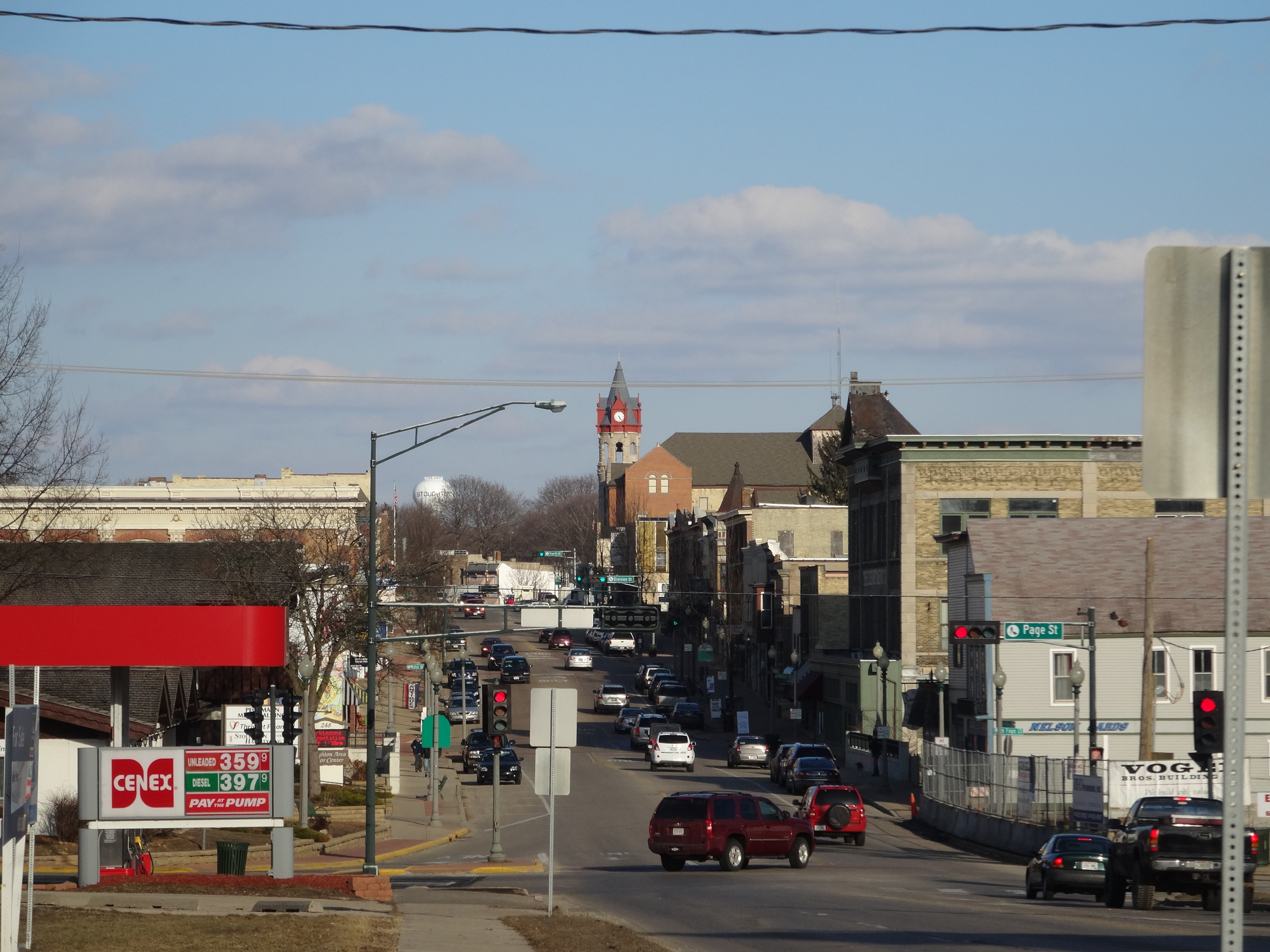
- Stoughton Main Street Commercial Historic District
- Interactive map of Stoughton, Wisconsin
- Location within Wisconsin Location within the United States
- Coordinates: 42°55′16″N 89°13′28″W
- Country: United States
- State: Wisconsin
- County: Dane

Government
  - Mayor: Tim Swadley

Area
  - Total: 6.35 sq mi (16.45 km^{2})
  - Land: 6.02 sq mi (15.58 km^{2})
  - Water: 0.33 sq mi (0.86 km^{2})
- Elevation: 876 ft (267 m)

Population (2020)
  - Total: 13,173
  - Estimate (2021): 13,085
  - Density: 2,179.6/sq mi (841.54/km^{2})
- Time zone: UTC-6 (Central (CST))
  - Summer (DST): UTC-5 (CDT)
- ZIP Code: 53589
- Area code: 608
- FIPS code: 55-77675
- GNIS feature ID: 1574965
- Website: cityofstoughton.com

Stoughton (/ˈstoʊtən/ STOH-tən) is a city in Dane County, Wisconsin, United States. It straddles the Yahara River about 20 miles (32 km) southeast of the state capital, Madison. As of the 2020 census, the population was 13,173. Stoughton is part of the Madison metropolitan area.

Known for its Norwegian heritage, Stoughton hosts a citywide celebration of Syttende Mai, the Norwegian constitution day. Part of the city's celebration of its Norwegian heritage is the Stoughton Norwegian Dancers dance group, sponsored by Stoughton High School, as well as Norwegian flags and memorabilia displayed throughout the town.

== History ==
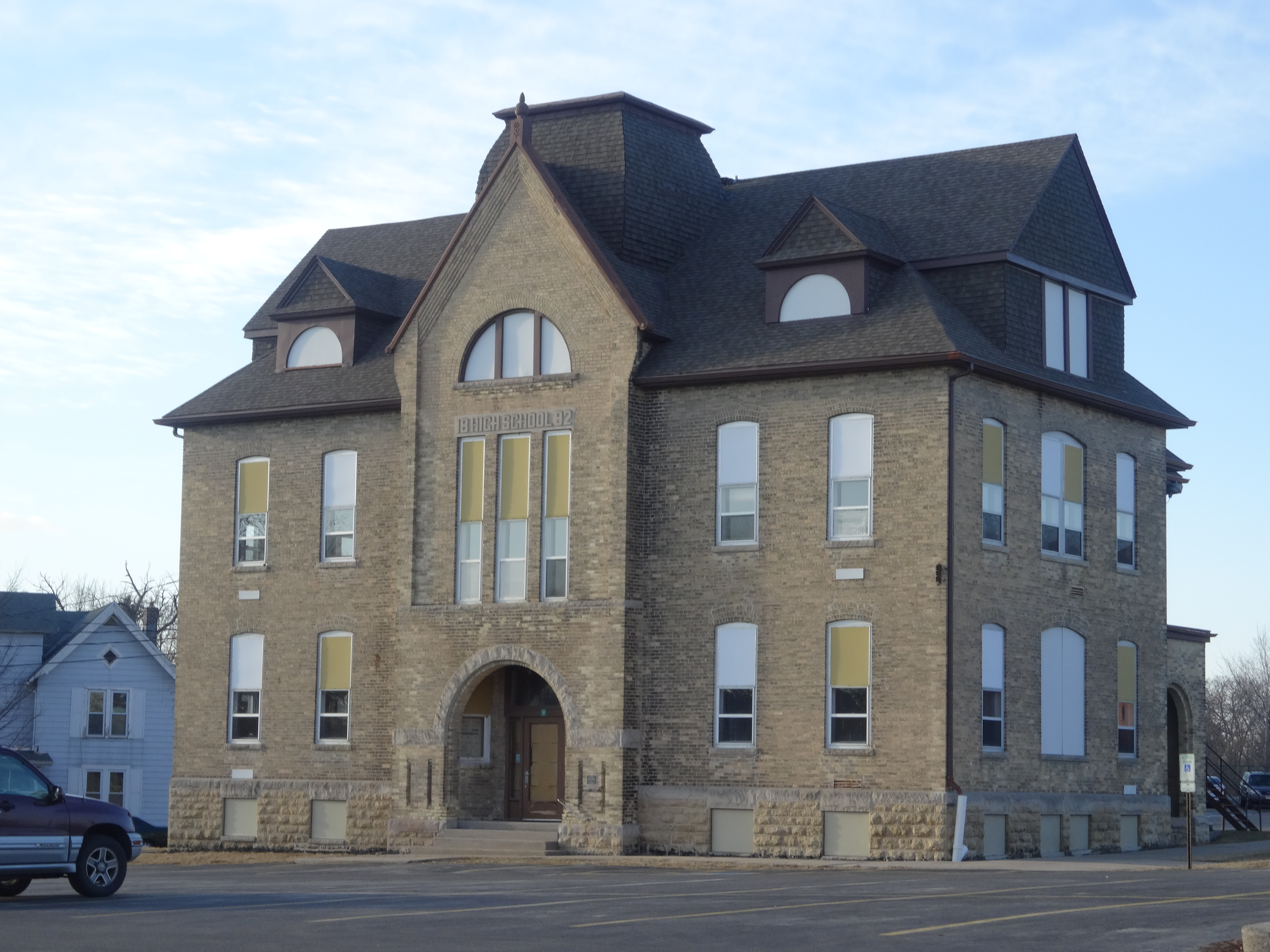
Former Stoughton High School building, built 1892-1893

Stoughton was founded in 1847 by Luke Stoughton, an Englishman from Vermont. Many Norwegian immigrants settled in the town from 1865 through the early 1900s.

Stoughton claims to be the birthplace of the "coffee break", and hosts a small yearly parade to celebrate the distinction.

For much of its history, Stoughton has been Dane County's second-largest and economically important city, after Madison.

In 1919, the Stoughton Wagon Company began putting custom wagon bodies on Model T chassis; by 1929 Ford was by far the biggest seller of station wagons.

On August 18, 2005, an F3 tornado cut a 10-mile path across rural subdivisions and farms north of Stoughton, killing one person and damaging hundreds of homes.

== Geography ==
According to the United States Census Bureau, the city has a total area of 5.09 square miles (13.18 km^{2}), of which 4.92 square miles (12.74 km^{2}) is land and 0.17 square miles (0.44 km^{2}) is water.

=== Climate ===
Climate data for Stoughton Wastewater Treatment Plant, Wisconsin (1991–2020 normals, extremes 1949–present)
Month	Jan	Feb	Mar	Apr	May	Jun	Jul	Aug	Sep	Oct	Nov	Dec	Year
Record high °F (°C)	56 (13)	70 (21)	82 (28)	92 (33)	96 (36)	101 (38)	103 (39)	103 (39)	98 (37)	89 (32)	77 (25)	66 (19)	103 (39)
Mean daily maximum °F (°C)	27.2 (−2.7)	31.4 (−0.3)	43.5 (6.4)	57.2 (14.0)	69.4 (20.8)	79.3 (26.3)	82.9 (28.3)	81.0 (27.2)	74.2 (23.4)	60.8 (16.0)	45.6 (7.6)	32.6 (0.3)	57.1 (13.9)
Daily mean °F (°C)	18.5 (−7.5)	22.0 (−5.6)	33.5 (0.8)	45.8 (7.7)	57.7 (14.3)	68.0 (20.0)	71.9 (22.2)	69.8 (21.0)	62.1 (16.7)	49.7 (9.8)	36.2 (2.3)	24.4 (−4.2)	46.6 (8.1)
Mean daily minimum °F (°C)	9.7 (−12.4)	12.5 (−10.8)	23.4 (−4.8)	34.4 (1.3)	46.0 (7.8)	56.8 (13.8)	60.9 (16.1)	58.7 (14.8)	50.0 (10.0)	38.6 (3.7)	26.8 (−2.9)	16.2 (−8.8)	36.2 (2.3)
Record low °F (°C)	−35 (−37)	−33 (−36)	−16 (−27)	2 (−17)	22 (−6)	34 (1)	41 (5)	38 (3)	19 (−7)	12 (−11)	−12 (−24)	−29 (−34)	−35 (−37)
Average precipitation inches (mm)	1.62 (41)	1.68 (43)	2.20 (56)	3.94 (100)	4.28 (109)	5.22 (133)	3.79 (96)	4.26 (108)	3.54 (90)	2.98 (76)	2.51 (64)	1.77 (45)	37.79 (960)
Average snowfall inches (cm)	10.4 (26)	10.6 (27)	4.5 (11)	0.7 (1.8)	0.0 (0.0)	0.0 (0.0)	0.0 (0.0)	0.0 (0.0)	0.0 (0.0)	0.4 (1.0)	1.3 (3.3)	7.6 (19)	35.5 (90)
Average precipitation days (≥ 0.01 in)	7.4	7.2	7.7	10.5	11.8	11.0	8.5	9.0	8.3	8.6	7.7	7.9	105.6
Average snowy days (≥ 0.1 in)	5.1	4.7	1.9	0.4	0.0	0.0	0.0	0.0	0.0	0.2	1.1	4.5	17.9
Source: NOAA

== Demographics ==
Historical population
Census	Pop.	Note	%±
1850	70		—
1870	985		—
1880	1,353		37.4%
1890	2,470		82.6%
1900	3,431		38.9%
1910	4,761		38.8%
1920	5,101		7.1%
1930	4,497		−11.8%
1940	4,743		5.5%
1950	4,833		1.9%
1960	5,555		14.9%
1970	6,096		9.7%
1980	7,589		24.5%
1990	8,786		15.8%
2000	12,354		40.6%
2010	12,611		2.1%
2020	13,173		4.5%
U.S. Decennial Census

=== 2020 census ===
As of the 2020 census, Stoughton had a population of 13,173. The median age was 41.3 years. 6.8% of residents were under the age of 5, 22.7% of residents were under the age of 18, and 18.6% of residents were 65 years of age or older. 52.0% of residents were female. For every 100 females there were 92.6 males, and for every 100 females age 18 and over there were 89.2 males age 18 and over. Of the total population, 601 were veterans.

99.1% of residents lived in urban areas, while 0.9% lived in rural areas.

There were 5,459 households in Stoughton, of which 29.6% had children under the age of 18 living in them. Of all households, 49.2% were married-couple households, 15.7% were households with a male householder and no spouse or partner present, and 27.5% were households with a female householder and no spouse or partner present. About 29.1% of all households were made up of individuals and 13.6% had someone living alone who was 65 years of age or older.

There were 5,811 housing units, of which 6.1% were vacant. The homeowner vacancy rate was 1.1% and the rental vacancy rate was 8.8%.

Racial composition as of the 2020 census
Race	Number	Percent
White	11,824	89.8%
Black or African American	269	2.0%
American Indian and Alaska Native	31	0.2%
Asian	197	1.5%
Native Hawaiian and Other Pacific Islander	0	0.0%
Some other race	138	1.0%
Two or more races	714	5.4%
Hispanic or Latino (of any race)	496	3.8%

=== Demographic estimates ===
A Census Bureau QuickFacts estimate reported 3,296 families residing in the city.

=== 2010 census ===
As of the census of 2010, there were 12,611 people, 5,133 households, and 3,296 families residing in the city. The population density was 2,563.2 inhabitants per square mile (989.7/km^{2}). There were 5,419 housing units at an average density of 1,101.4 per square mile (425.3/km^{2}). The racial makeup of the city was 95.1% White, 1.4% African American, 0.2% Native American, 1.3% Asian, 0.4% from other races, and 1.5% from two or more races. Hispanic or Latino people of any race were 1.8% of the population.

There were 5,133 households, of which 33.6% had children under the age of 18 living with them, 49.3% were married couples living together, 10.7% had a female householder with no husband present, 4.2% had a male householder with no wife present, and 35.8% were non-families. 29.4% of all households were made up of individuals, and 12.4% had someone living alone who was 65 years of age or older. The average household size was 2.41 and the average family size was 2.99.

The median age in the city was 39.2 years. 25.1% of residents were under the age of 18; 6.5% were between the ages of 18 and 24; 27.6% were from 25 to 44; 26.2% were from 45 to 64; and 14.6% were 65 years of age or older. The gender makeup of the city was 47.2% male and 52.8% female.

=== 2000 census ===
As of the census of 2000, there were 12,354 people, 4,734 households, and 3,185 families residing in the city. The population density was 3,116.6 people per square mile (1,204.5/km^{2}). There were 4,890 housing units at an average density of 1,233.6 per square mile (476.8/km^{2}). The racial makeup of the city was 96.66% White, 0.92% African American, 0.29% Native American, 0.70% Asian, 0.02% Pacific Islander, 0.36% from other races, and 1.05% from two or more races. Hispanic or Latino people of any race were 1.24% of the population. 32.0% were of German, 28.9% Norwegian, 8.5% Irish and 5.3% English ancestry.

There were 4,734 households, out of which 37.5% had children under the age of 18 living with them, 53.6% were married couples living together, 10.1% had a female householder with no husband present, and 32.7% were non-families. 26.2% of all households were made up of individuals, and 11.6% had someone living alone who was 65 years of age or older. The average household size was 2.52 and the average family size was 3.06.

In the city, the population was spread out, with 28.3% under the age of 18, 6.4% from 18 to 24, 32.6% from 25 to 44, 18.4% from 45 to 64, and 14.3% who were 65 years of age or older. The median age was 35 years. For every 100 females, there were 89.4 males. For every 100 females age 18 and over, there were 86.3 males.

The median income for a household in the city was $47,633, and the median income for a family was $58,543. Males had a median income of $37,956 versus $26,187 for females. The per capita income for the city was $21,037. About 3.1% of families and 5.0% of the population were below the poverty line, including 5.9% of those under age 18 and 7.2% of those age 65 or over.

== Economy ==
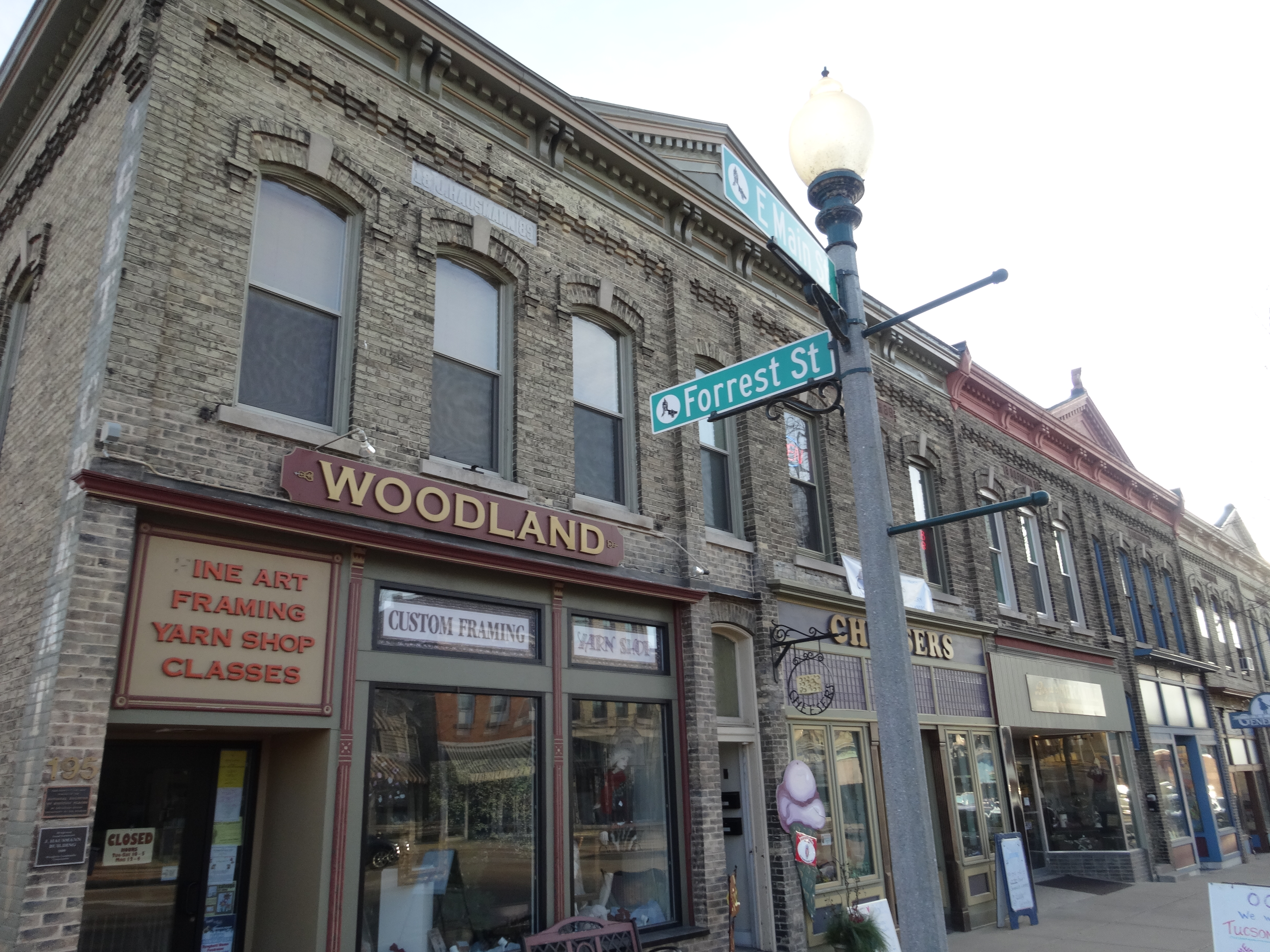
Hausmann-Chrestoffer Block, downtown Stoughton

The corporate headquarters and semi-trailer manufacturing facility for Stoughton Trailers are located in Stoughton, where the company has been locally owned and operated for more than 50 years. The 680,000 sq. ft. Stoughton plant houses everything from fabrication of subassemblies to final assembly of all Stoughton dry vans. Stoughton Trailers is one of the largest truck trailer manufacturing companies in North America, and is the only American company still manufacturing 53-foot-long "intermodal" freight containers used to ship goods internationally.

Another large employer in the city is Uniroyal Engineered Products, makers of Naugahyde. Stoughton and its environs are also home to printers, and manufacturers of foodstuffs, chemicals, and sundry other products. North American Fur Auctions' US offices are based in Stoughton.

Stoughton Utilities, a municipally owned utility, provides electrical, water and sewer service to the city.

== Arts and culture ==
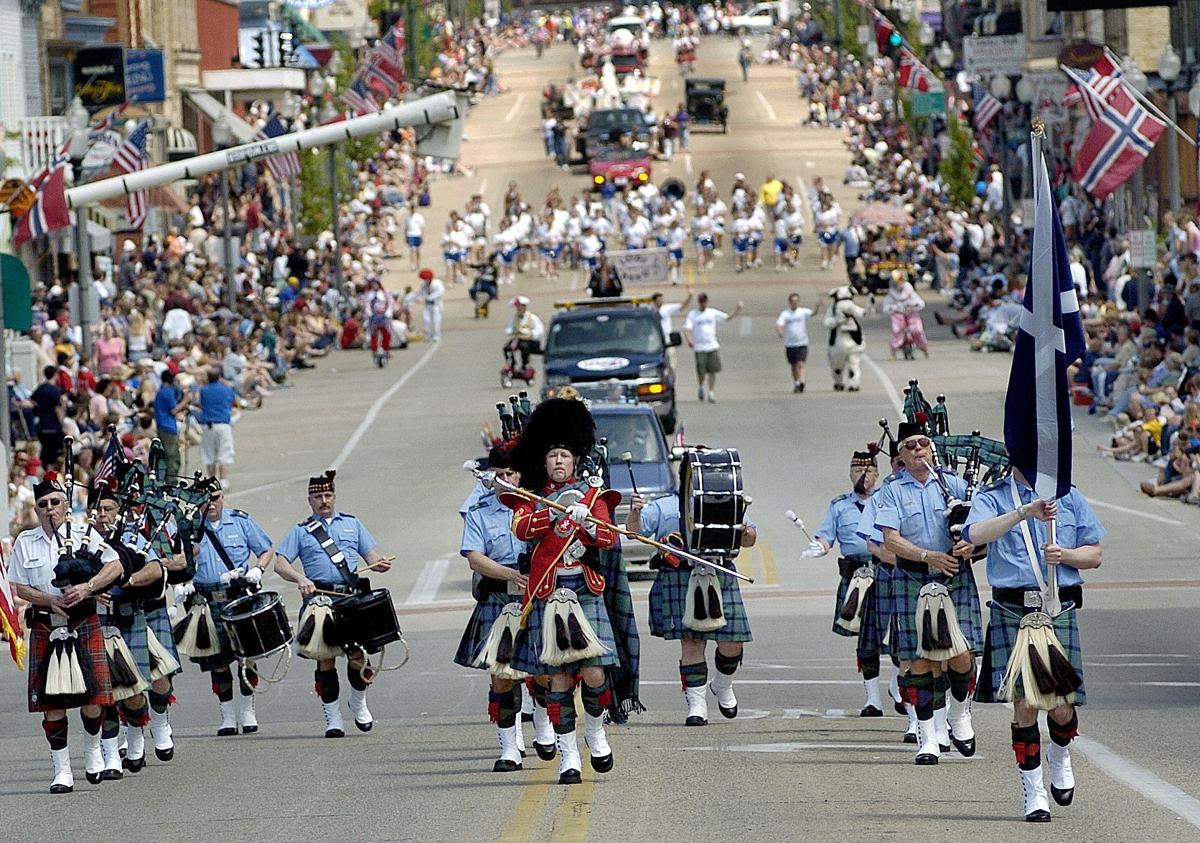
Syttende Mai Parade

The coffee break is said to have originated in Stoughton, when immigrant men became employed en masse at T. G. Mandt's wagon factory, leaving their wives to fill the shortages at the tobacco warehouses. They agreed to work under the condition that they were allowed to go home every morning and afternoon to tend to chores and, of course, drink coffee. The city of Stoughton celebrates the coffee break every summer with the Stoughton Coffee Break Festival.

The first weekend in December marks Stoughton's Victorian Holiday Weekend, celebrating the city's Victorian homes and commercial buildings. Events include a Victorian Holiday Ball with period dances, a production of the Nutcracker Ballet or A Christmas Carol (alternates each year), carriage rides, a silent decorated fire truck parade, a children's parade.

The weekend closest to May 17, Norwegian Constitution Day, marks Stoughton's Syttende Mai festival. The celebration includes parades, an art fair, Norwegian dance performances, races, and other events. The Stoughton Chamber of Commerce has planned the festival every year since 1967.

In 2004, a Norwegian TV crew traveled to the Midwest to witness modern manifestations of Norsky culture in the US. They visited Stoughton, Mount Horeb and Decorah, Iowa. Their documentary Ja, de elsker (Yes, they love, a reference to the Norwegian national anthem) was aired on NRK1 on May 16 and 17, 2006.

== Government ==
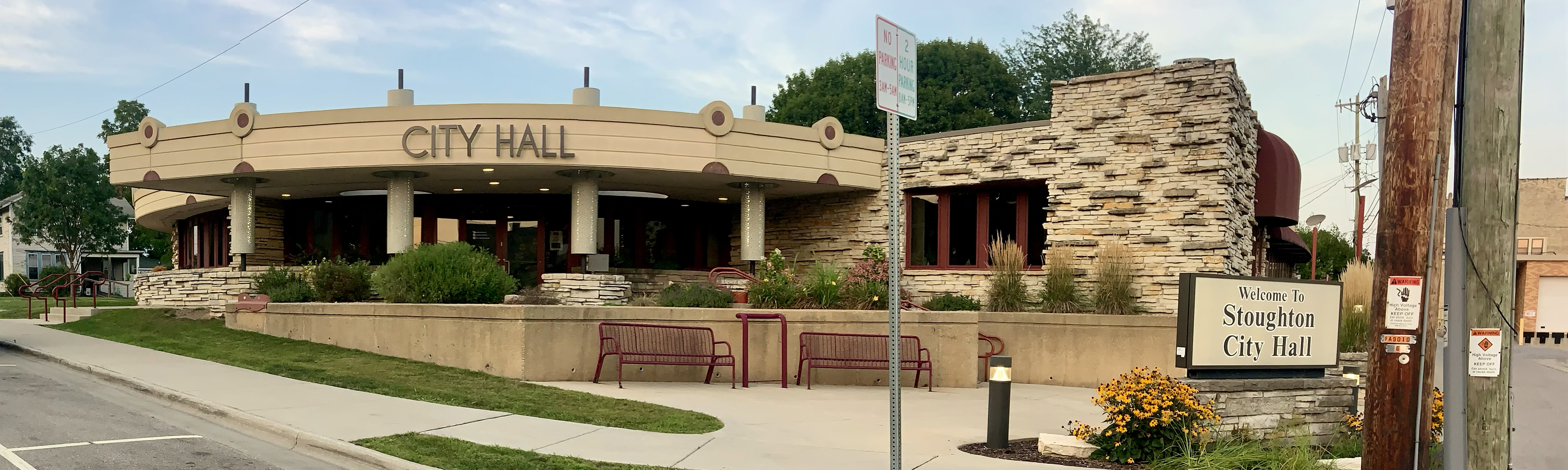
Stoughton City Hall

Stoughton is incorporated as a city, with an elected mayor and a 12-member city council. Aldermen from four districts are elected to three-year terms, with the terms staggered so one seat is up for election in each district each spring.

The Stoughton Area School District serves the city, and is overseen by an elected board of education.

== Education ==
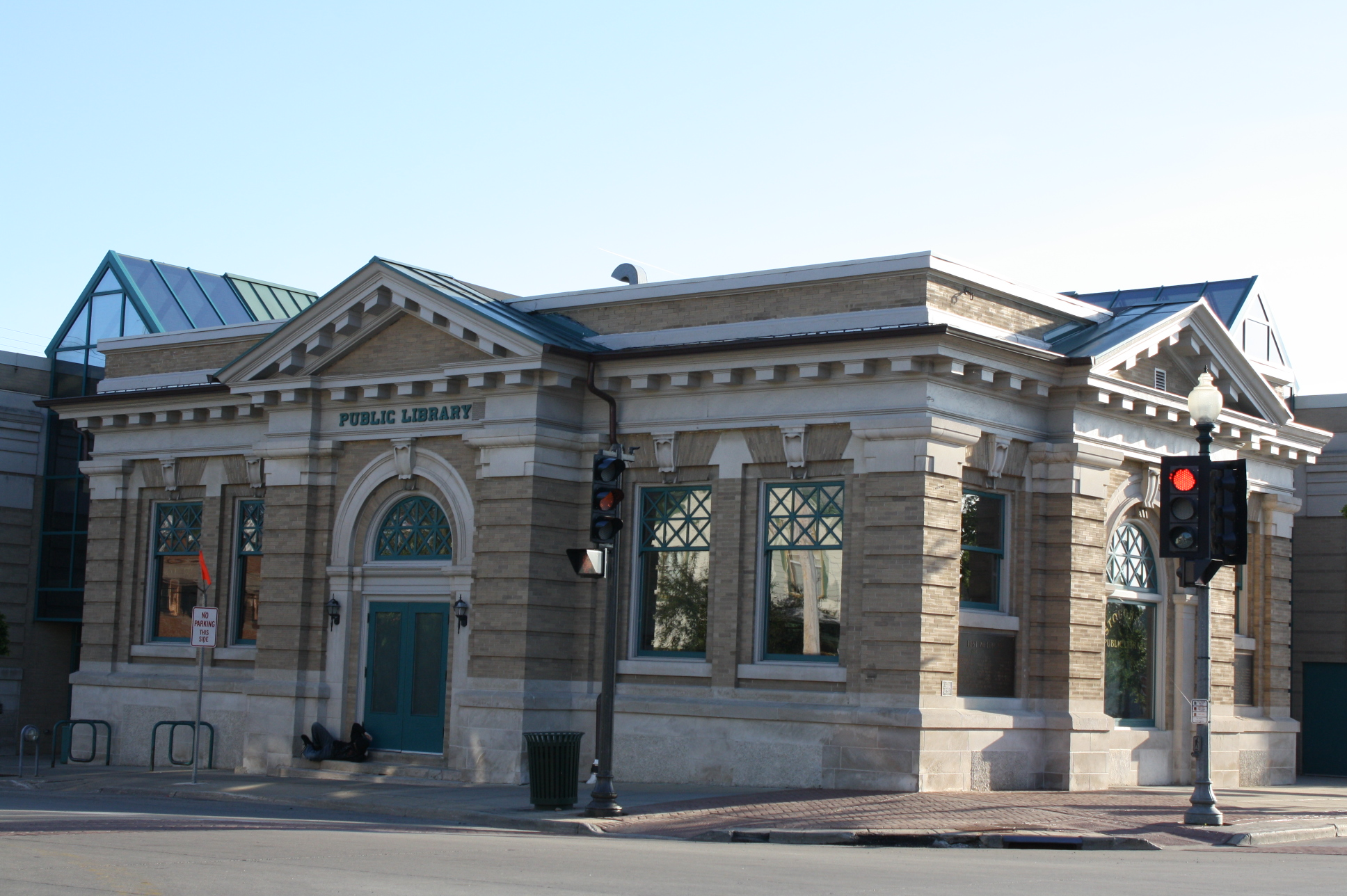
Stoughton Public Library

Stoughton is served by the Stoughton Area School District, which covers most of southeastern Dane County as well as a small portion of Rock County. SASD operates three elementary schools, one middle school, and one high school (Stoughton High School). There is no higher education in the city, but a UW science lab operates in rural Stoughton on Schneider Road.

== Media ==
The weekly Stoughton Courier-Hub newspaper, founded in 1969, is published on Thursdays.

WSTO TV is a public, educational, and government access (PEG) cable TV channel operated by The City of Stoughton's Information Technology/Media Services Department.

The 495-seat Stoughton Opera House features about 30 traveling musical, comedy and other acts each year.

== Transportation ==
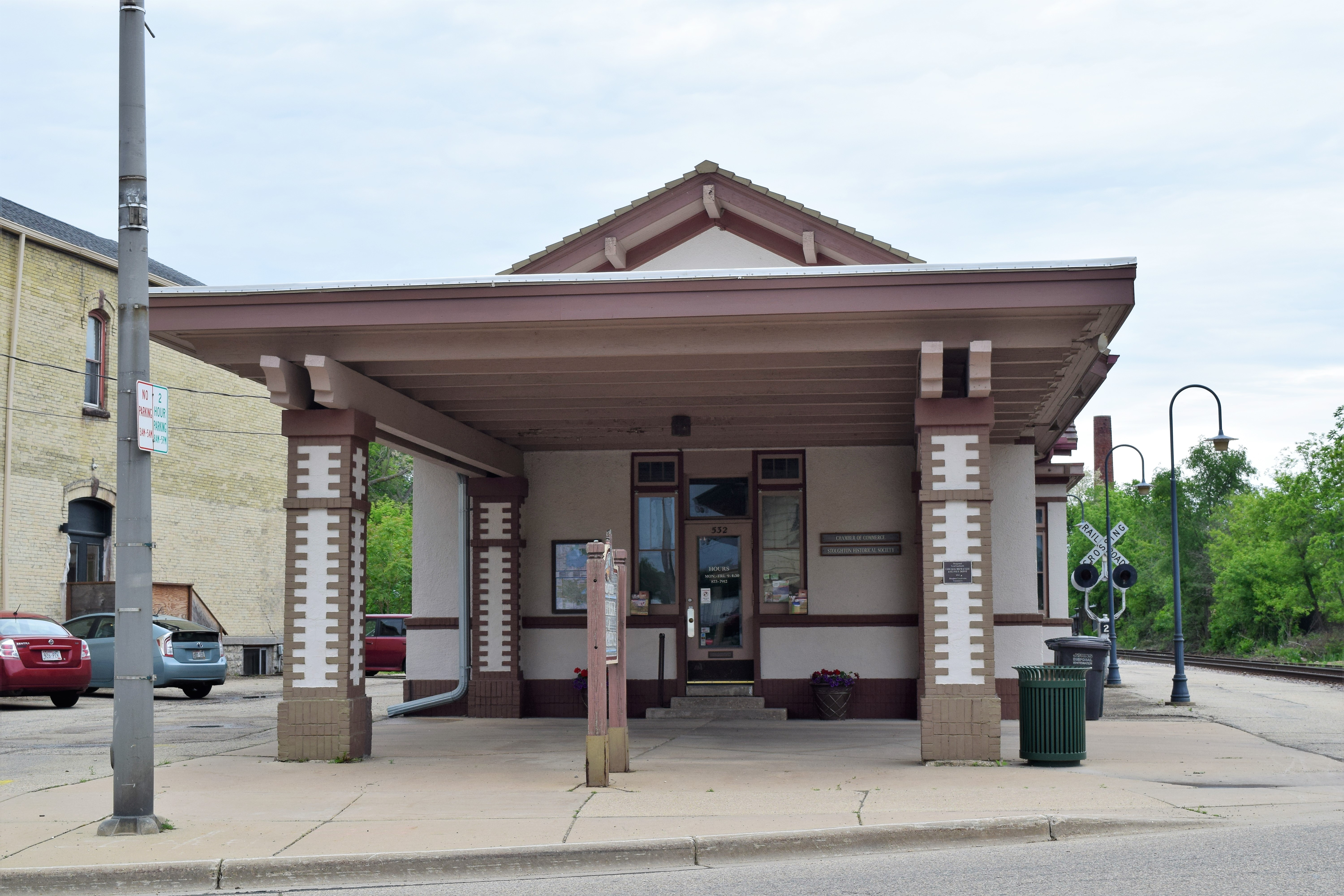
Milwaukee Road Stoughton depot

Stoughton is served by Interstate 39 (I-39) and I-90, which run concurrently and have two exits five miles (8.0 km) north (Exit 147) and west (Exit 156) of the city. US Highway 51 comes from Madison and goes along the west side of town, then turns east through downtown towards the Interstates. US Highway 14 has an exit for Stoughton at Wisconsin Highway 138, six miles west of the city in the village of Oregon. WIS-138 heads west at US-14 from Oregon into Stoughton, then goes south towards the unincorporated Cooksville.

A small general aviation airport is located two miles (3.2 km) east of the city. Commercial air service is provided by Dane County Regional Airport.

== Notable people ==
- John Edward Erickson, Governor of Montana, born in Stoughton
- Jerry Frei, head coach of the Oregon Ducks football team, NFL assistant coach
- Gale Gillingham, Green Bay Packer Hall of Fame
- Russell Hellickson, silver medalist in freestyle wrestling at the 1976 Summer Olympics
- Bob Homme, star of the Canadian television series The Friendly Giant
- Henry Huber, Lieutenant Governor of Wisconsin
- Justin Jacobs, 2014 PECASE winner, Orlando Magic statistician
- Ole C. Lee, Wisconsin State Representative
- Thomas A. Loftus, United States ambassador to Norway, Wisconsin politician
- Louis K. Luse, Wisconsin State Representative and lawyer
- Per Lysne, artist
- Alonzo J. Mathison, Wisconsin State Representative
- John McCarthy, Nebraska politician and member of the United States House of Representatives, born in Stoughton
- John E. McCoy, U.S. Air National Guard general
- Henry Everett McNeil, writer
- Billy Moll, songwriter
- William P. Murphy, Nobel Prize laureate
- Truman O. Olson, Medal of Honor recipient
- Andrew Rein, silver medal in freestyle wrestling (lightweight class) at the 1984 Summer Olympics
- Ole K. Roe, Wisconsin State Representative
- Christopher J. Rollis, Wisconsin State Representative and newspaper editor
- Rudy Silbaugh, Wisconsin State Representative
- Carl W. Thompson, Wisconsin State Senator
- Charles D. Wells, Wisconsin State Representative
- Norman Wengert, political scientist
- Wayne W. Wood, Wisconsin State Representative
- Ralph Wise Zwicker, U.S. Army Major General
