= Herman Miller (politician) =

American politician

Herman Miller (November 11, 1833 – May 29, 1922) was an American politician and businessman.

Born in Pomerania, Kingdom of Prussia, Miller emigrated to the United States in 1856 and settled in Marathon County, Wisconsin. He manufactured shingles and worked in a store. Miller also owned a hotel in Wausau, Wisconsin. He served a register of deeds for Marathon County. Miller also served on the Wausau village board and the Marathon County Board Supervisors. He was a Republican. Miller served in the Wisconsin State Assembly from 1901 to 1905.
