= Stoughton Main Street Commercial Historic District =

Historic district in Wisconsin, United States

- U.S. National Register of Historic Places
- U.S. Historic district
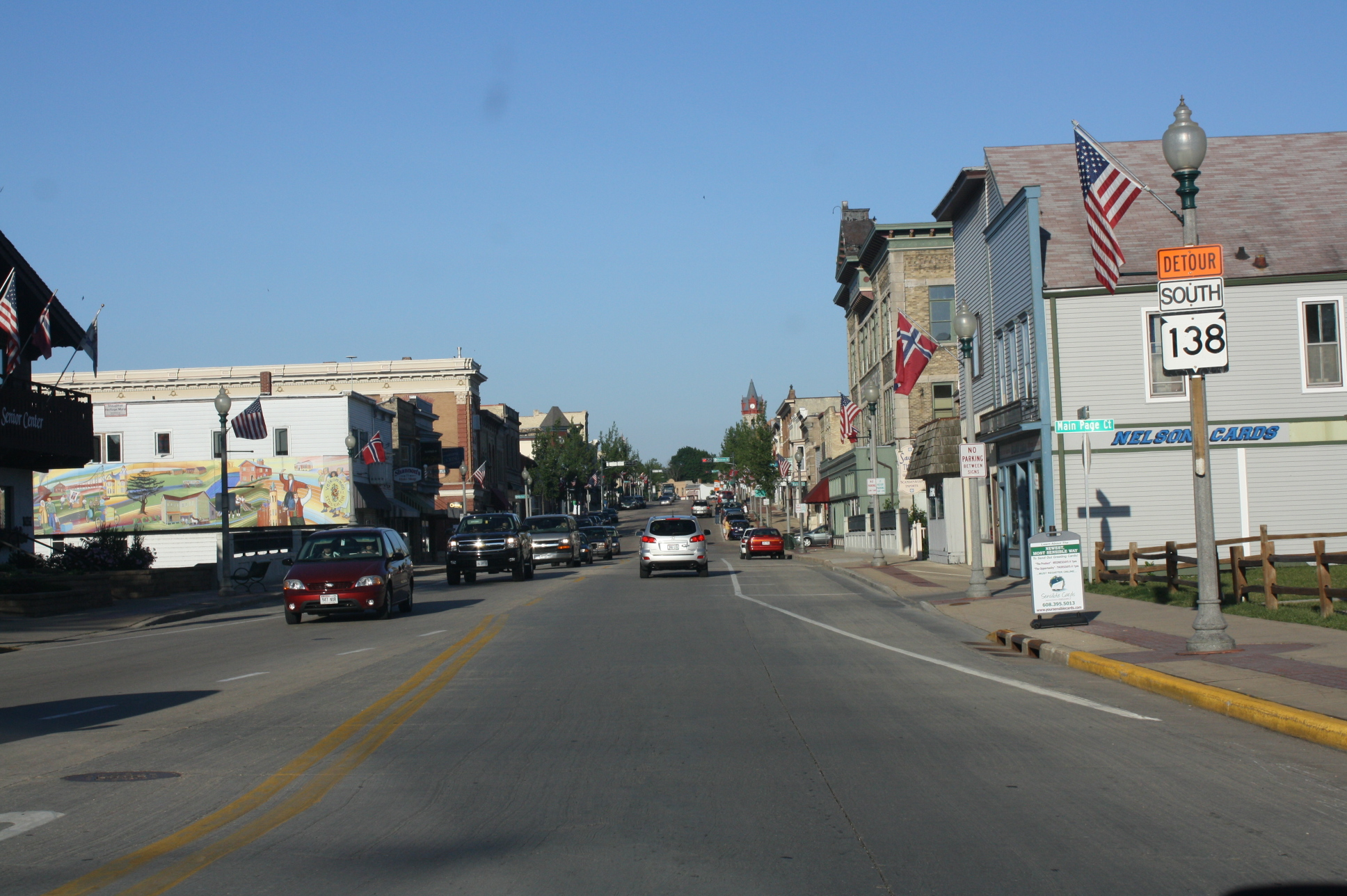
- Stoughton Main Street Commercial Historic District

- Location within Wisconsin Location within the United States
- Location: Stoughton, Wisconsin
- Coordinates: 42.91678°N 89.22041°W
- NRHP reference No.: 82001842
- Added to NRHP: October 21, 1982

The Stoughton Main Street Commercial Historic District is a collection of 36 surviving historic business structures in the old downtown of Stoughton, Wisconsin, United States. It was added to the National Register of Historic Places in 1982.

== History ==
Stoughton began in 1847 when pioneer Luke Stoughton platted a village along the Yahara River, then called Catfish Creek. He built a dam on the river, a sawmill, and a grist mill, and that same year Alvin West built an inn at what is now 101 W. Main. The Milwaukee and Mississippi Railroad reached town in 1853, making Stoughton a shipping center for wheat from the surrounding farms. T.G. Mandt started a wagon-making factory the 1860s which was so successful that the town was known as "the Hub City." In 1880 Mandt's factory produced 5,000 wagons, 50,000 to 75,000 wheel hubs, and employed almost 200 men.

Most early stores were built of wood, and in 1889 a fire destroyed a whole row of frame buildings on East Main Street, from 139 to 195 E. Main - except for the Moen Bakery building at 147-143 E. Main. That bakery had been built around 1882 of brick, and it survived, though damaged. The owners and city decided to rebuild the entire block in brick, two stories tall, with a unified design. The large project was managed by George Becker. Even the Moen Bakery got a new cornice to match the other buildings.

These are some pivotal buildings in the district, in roughly the order built:

- The Masonic Hall at 160 E. Main is a 3-story cream brick structure built in 1869 - the tallest building in the district. The original street-level storefront is hidden by a later lannon-stone veneer, but the upper stories are still largely intact. Brick pilasters frame the sides of the building, windows have round heads, and Italianate styling can be seen in the brick frieze at the top of the facade. A metal cornice once made the building appear even taller, but it is gone. The building has housed a Mason's Hall, a cigar factory, and a clothing store, among other uses.
- The Jensen Block at 180 E. Main is a largely intact 2-story Italianate-styled business block built between 1871 and 1882, with original windows crowned with round heads and brick arches. Above that is an ornate brick frieze topped by a denticulated metal cornice. The building originally housed a boot and shoe store.
- The block of six 2-story buildings from 139 to 195 E. Main is the group that was rebuilt together after the fire of 1889. They are all 2-stories, brick, finished in a commercial Victorian style, with segmental window hoods and a continuous bracketed cornice with a pediment shared between each pair of buildings:
  - The Hausmann-Chrestoffer Block at 195 E. Main housed a saloon.
  - The Forton Building at 175 E. Main housed a clothes store.
  - The Mikkelson Building at 161 E. Main housed a dry goods store.
  - The Erikson Building at 151 E. Main housed a furniture store.
  - The Moen Bakery at 143-147 E. Main housed a drug store.
  - The Johnson Block at 139 E. Main housed a meat market.
- The Hyland-Olsen Block at 201 W. Main is a 3-story cream brick Neoclassical building designed by Jay Knapp of Milwaukee and built by George Becker and Fred Hill in 1897. Walls and windows are framed in strips of white stone. The walls are topped with a cornice of galvanized iron, with a pediment/parapet above that on the center of one side. In the early years the building housed "Stoughton's leading department store," owned by K.G. Olsen and Dr. Francis Hyland, a "magnetic healer." The large building also housed Stoughton's first telephone exchange, a bank, offices, and fraternal organizations.
- The Hausmann Block Saloon at 105 E. Main is a 2-story brick business block built in 1903 by L.B. Gilbert. Its distinctive feature is the corner tower, covered with pressed metal and topped with a conical roof and a finial ball. Its style is Queen Anne, seen in the corner tower and the different textures in the brick wall. The building was built to serve as a saloon for Carl Hausmann, a Madison brewer. By 1912 it also housed a moving picture place.
- The Boyce Block at 134 E. Main was originally built in the late 1850s, but was remodeled in 1905. The design of the upper facade suggests one broad pilaster containing three tall round-headed windows with voussoirs in contrasting colors radiating from each top. Above that is a classical entablature, ending in a dentilated cornice. A drugstore occupied the first story and a meeting hall was above.
- The Erickson Block at 188-194 W. Main is a 3-story, red brick structure built by George Becker in 1905 for $16,000. The upper two stories feature a colonnade of red brick pilasters framing panels of cream brick and arch-topped windows. Each pilaster is crowned with a terra cotta capital and they support a classical entablature. Over the years the building has housed a boot and shoe store, offices, and a bank.
- The Citizen's State Bank at 171 W. Main is a Neoclassical structure built around 1907, with the front dominated by four brick piers which are decorated with bands of light stone. Similar to the Boyce Block above, the front is capped with an entablature with dentilated cornice.
