= Edward C. Notbohm =

American politician

Edward C. Notbohm was a member of the Wisconsin State Assembly during the 1895 session. A native of Milwaukee, Wisconsin, Notbohm represented the 7th District of Milwaukee County, Wisconsin. He was a Republican.
