= Stoughton Area School District =

School district in Wisconsin, United States

Stoughton Area School District (SASD) is a school district headquartered in Stoughton, Wisconsin.

It includes sections of Dane County and Rock County.

== History ==
In 1997 it began having 5th and 6th graders in Sandhill School.

Beginning in the 1970s the district hosted Drum Corps International groups. By 1999 the district accused some groups of damaging property and so demanded that they pay fees. In 1998 the district stated it would continue hosting the group but asked it to pay fees that DCI felt were unfair.

== Schools ==
Secondary

- Stoughton High School
- River Bluff Middle School

Elementary:

- Fox Prairie Elementary School
- Kegonsa Elementary School
- Sandhill Elementary School

It has a 4 year old Kindergarten program at various sites.
