= Reinhard Klabunde =

American politician

Reinhard Klabunde was a German-born American member of the Wisconsin State Assembly.

== Biography ==
Klabunde was born on March 14, 1858, in Germany. He later moved to Milwaukee, Wisconsin.

== Career ==
Klabunde was elected to the Assembly in 1894 and re-elected in 1896. He was a Republican.
