= Joshua B. Bradbury =

American farmer, teacher, and politician

Joshua Barber Bradbury (February 9, 1849 – January 22, 1918) was an American farmer, teacher, and politician.

Born in Potosi, Wisconsin, Bradford went to Platteville Normal School (now University of Wisconsin–Platteville). He taught school and was principal of a school. In 1882, he moved to a farm in the town of Mount Ida, Wisconsin. He was assessor and chairman of the Mount Ida Town Board. In 1895, Bradbury served in the Wisconsin State Assembly and was a Republican. During his term, he introduced a bill to tax and regulate imitation butter and cheese. Later he moved to the village of Fennimore, Wisconsin.
