= Gerrit T. Thorn =

19th century American politician

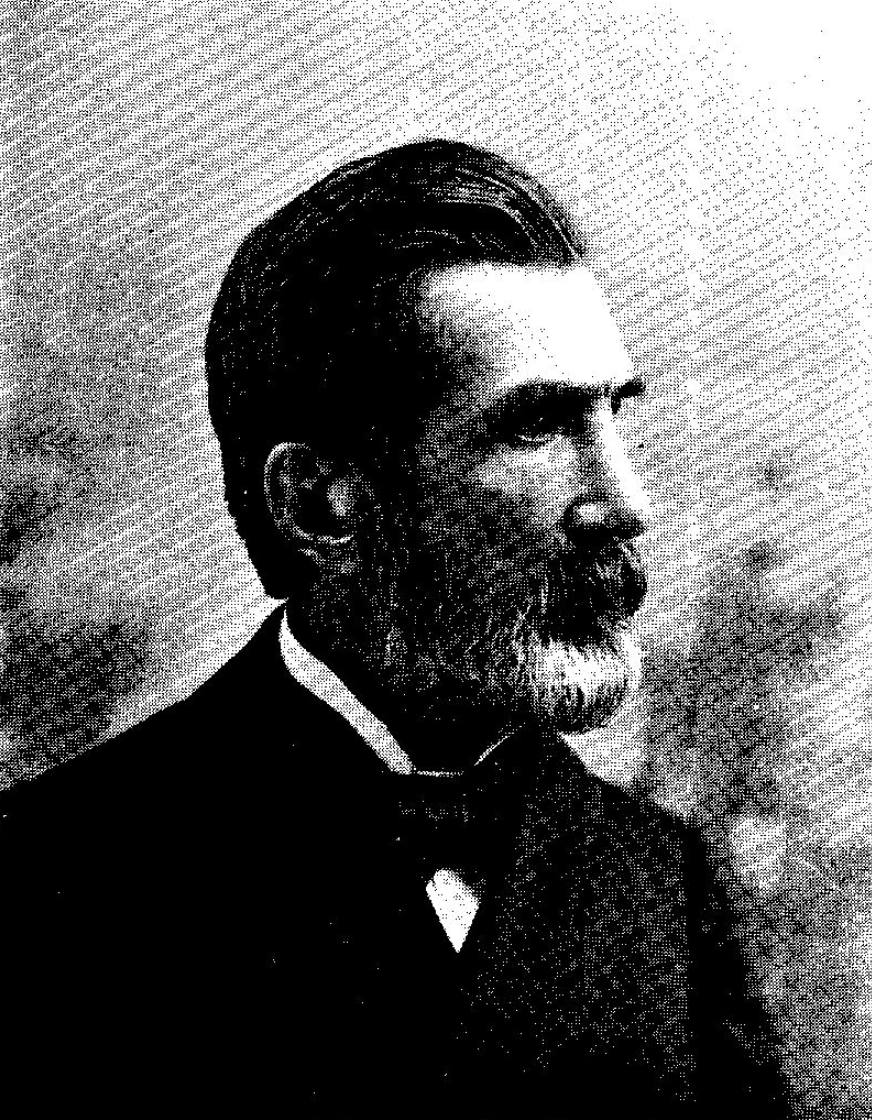
- From Men of Progress, Wisconsin (1897)

Member of the Wisconsin Senate from the 23rd district
- In office January 7, 1867 – January 4, 1869
- Preceded by: S. W. Budlong
- Succeeded by: William W. Woodman

Member of the Wisconsin State Assembly from the Fond du Lac 3rd district
- In office January 2, 1871 – January 1, 1872
- Preceded by: John Boyd
- Succeeded by: Aaron Walters

Personal details
- Born: July 20, 1832 La Fayette, New York, U.S.
- Died: February 3, 1900 (aged 64) New London, Wisconsin, U.S.
- Party: Democratic
- Spouses: Maria Bicknell (m. 1859; died 1863); Elizabeth Clark (m. 1864)
- Children: Gerrit T. Thorn Jr.; Robert C. Thorn; Paul C. Thorn; Blanche E. Thorn; Grace Edna Thorn
- Profession: Lawyer

Military service
- Allegiance: United States
- Branch/service: United States Volunteers; Union Army
- Years of service: 1862–1863
- Rank: Lt. Colonel, USV
- Unit: 29th Reg. Wis. Vol. Infantry
- Battles/wars: American Civil War

Gerrit Tunis Thorn (July 20, 1832 – February 3, 1900) was an American lawyer and Democratic politician. He represented Jefferson County in the Wisconsin State Senate in 1867 & 1868, and later represented the city of Fond du Lac in the Wisconsin State Assembly in 1871.

== Early life ==
Gerrit T. Thorn was born in La Fayette, Onondaga County, New York, in July 1832. He received a thorough education, and studied mathematics and civil engineering through the La Fayette Public School and the Yates Polytechnic Institute.

At age 16, he began the study of law in the office of Isaac W. Brewster in Jamesville, New York. Brewster was also postmaster at Jamesville, and Thorn served as his clerk and deputy. One of the residents of the village was a subscriber to the Watertown Chronicle from Watertown, Wisconsin, and allowed Thorn, as deputy postmaster, to read his paper when it came in. It was in reading these accounts of Wisconsin that Thorn decided to eventually settle in that new state.

In 1850, Thorn moved to Rome, Pennsylvania, and worked as a clerk and bookkeeper for a store owned by Henry Wells Tracy. During the winter of 1851–1852, he taught school in Luzerne County, Pennsylvania, after which he returned to New York and attended the Yates Polytechnic Institute. He abandoned his studies due to poor health in 1854, and traveled by steamer to Milwaukee, Wisconsin. From there he went to work as a farmhand in Dodge County, Wisconsin, but traveled extensively around southeast Wisconsin, familiarizing himself with the land.

After teaching school for another season in Watertown, Wisconsin, he resumed his law studies under Henry S. Baird, and then with congressman Charles Billinghurst. During these years in Dodge County, he also served as deputy register of deeds and deputy clerk of the circuit court. He was admitted to the bar in the Fall of 1858 and began to practice law in Juneau, Wisconsin. The next year, however, he relocated to Jefferson, Wisconsin.

== Civil War service ==
At the outbreak of the American Civil War, Thorn gave a passionate speech in defense of the Union and helped raise a company of volunteers from Jefferson, which became Company E of the 4th Wisconsin Infantry Regiment. Thorn was also moved to enlist, but delayed for a year due to the poor health of his wife. He officially volunteered for the Union Army in August 1862 and was commissioned lieutenant colonel of the 29th Wisconsin Infantry Regiment.

The 29th Wisconsin Infantry was sent down the Mississippi River for service in the western theater of the war. While the regiment was stationed in Helena, Arkansas, Thorn received word that his wife and infant child were seriously ill. He sought a furlough to visit with them, but when he was unable to receive a furlough, he resigned his commission. Unfortunately, his wife died before his arrival, in March 1863.

== Political and legal career ==
Thorn resumed his legal practice in Jefferson and continued through the 1860s, and was elected to two terms as village president. During these years, he also worked as an editor on the Jefferson Banner—a Democratic partisan newspaper—and saw it become one of the more influential Democratic papers in the interior of the state. He was a member of the Democratic Party's slate of presidential electors in the 1864 United States presidential election, and, in 1866, he was elected to a two-year term in the Wisconsin State Senate, running on the Democratic Party ticket. His district comprised all of Jefferson County. He was the youngest member of the Senate during this term; he was 34 at the start of his term. He was then a delegate to the 1868 Democratic National Convention.

In 1867, Thorn took a leading role in the founding of the Jefferson Liberal Institute in Jefferson, and served as its first president. The school was later purchased by the city of Jefferson and became a high school.

In 1869, he left Jefferson for Fond du Lac, Wisconsin, where he became a law partner of Edward S. Bragg. A year later, he was elected to the Wisconsin State Assembly. In the 1871 session, he represented Fond du Lac County's 3rd Assembly district, which then comprised most of the city of Fond du Lac. He remained in Fond du Lac for only a few years though. Due to poor health, he sold his business and his library to James Franklin Ware in 1873, and moved to Maryland. He spent most of the next year in Washington, D.C., and by the Fall of 1874 he was feeling better and chose to return to Wisconsin.

He moved to Appleton, Wisconsin, where he prosperous legal practice for a few years. But health again forced him to resign in 1878. He moved to a farm in Nebraska for four years, then moved to the west coast. He stopped briefly in California and Oregon before settling in the Washington Territory. He remained in the area of the Puget Sound for three years. He finally chose to return to Wisconsin in September 1886, traveling by rail on the newly completed Canadian Pacific Railway, through Winnipeg and Manitoba.

He formed a law partnership with F. W. Houghton in Oshkosh, Wisconsin, then moved to Clintonville, Wisconsin, and partnered with F. M. Guerney until 1893, when he relocated to New London, Wisconsin, and worked in private practice. He was in poor health through all of 1899, and by October of that year could no longer leave the house. He died at his home in New London in February 1900.

== Personal life and family ==
Gerrit Thorn was the youngest son of Jehiel Thorn and his wife Sarah (née Houghtaling). Jehiel Thorn served as a volunteer in the New York militia during the War of 1812. The Thorns trace their ancestry to Quaker immigrants who came to the New Netherland colony in the 1630s.

Gerrit Thorn married Maria Bicknell of Vermont in May 1859. Bicknell was a teacher of the high school in Fox Lake, Wisconsin. Thorn had one child with Maria Bicknell, but both Bicknell and the child died of disease in 1863. In 1864, Thorn married for a second time, this time with Elizabeth Clark of Prince George's County, Maryland. With his second wife, Thorn had three sons and two daughters, who all survived him.

Wisconsin State Assembly
Preceded by John Boyd	Member of the Wisconsin State Assembly from the Fond du Lac 3rd district January 2, 1871 – January 1, 1872	Succeeded by Aaron Walters
Wisconsin Senate
Preceded by S. W. Budlong	Member of the Wisconsin Senate from the 23rd district January 7, 1867 – January 4, 1869	Succeeded by William W. Woodman
