= Wisconsin's 23rd Senate district =

American legislative district in northwest Wisconsin

Wisconsin's 23rd State Senate district
- 2024 map defined in 2023 Wisc. Act 94; 2022 map defined in Johnson v. Wisconsin Elections Commission; 2011 map was defined in 2011 Wisc. Act 43 composed of Assembly districts 67, 68, and 69
Senator
| Jesse James; R–Thorp |
since January 3, 2023 (3 years, 55 days)
- Demographics: 93.05% White; 1.23% Black; 2.59% Hispanic; 0.69% Asian; 1.63% Native American; 0.12% Hawaiian/Pacific Islander
- Population (2020) • Voting age: 179,916; 138,442
- Website: Official website
- Notes: Northwest Wisconsin

The 23rd Senate district of Wisconsin is one of 33 districts in the Wisconsin Senate. Located in northwest Wisconsin, the district comprises all of Barron, Clark, Price, Rusk, and Taylor counties, with most of Chippewa County, northern Dunn County, and parts of northwest Marathon County. The district is mostly rural, but contains the cities of Bloomer, Ladysmith, Medford, Neillsville, and Rice Lake.

== Current elected officials ==
Jesse James is the senator representing the 23rd district since January 2023. He previously served in the State Assembly, representing the 68th Assembly district from 2019 to 2023. After the 2024 redistricting, James no longer resides in the new district.

Each Wisconsin State Senate district is composed of three Wisconsin State Assembly districts. The 23rd Senate district comprises the 67th, 68th, and 69th Assembly districts. The current representatives of those districts are:

- Assembly District 67: David Armstrong (R–Rice Lake)
- Assembly District 68: Rob Summerfield (R–Bloomer)
- Assembly District 69: Karen Hurd (R–Withee)

The 23rd Senate district crosses two congressional districts. The portion of the district in Dunn County and the northwest part of Chippewa County fall within Wisconsin's 3rd congressional district, which is represented by U.S. Representative Derrick Van Orden. The remainder of the district falls within Wisconsin's 7th congressional district, which is represented by U.S. Representative Tom Tiffany.

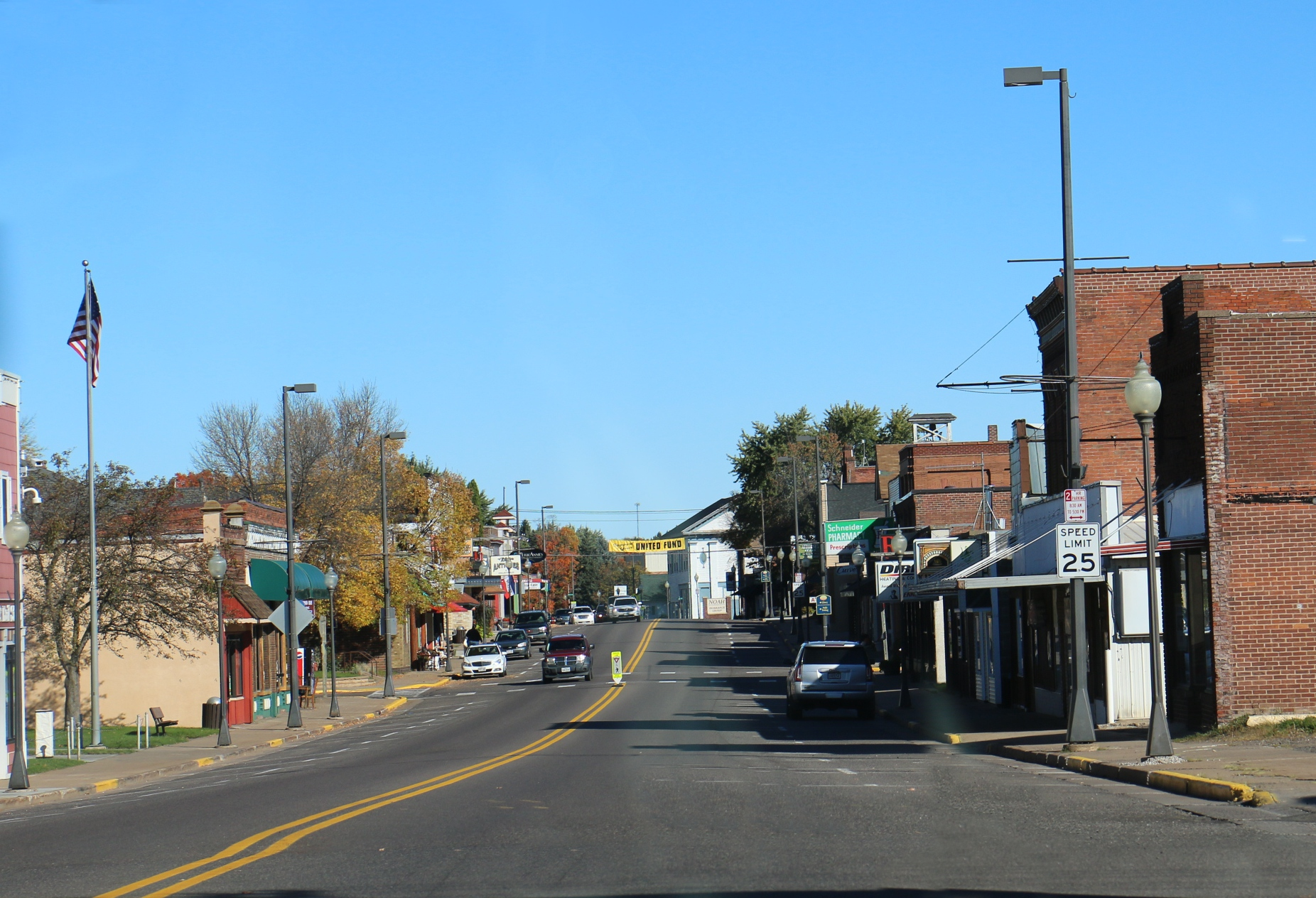
Cumberland, Wisconsin

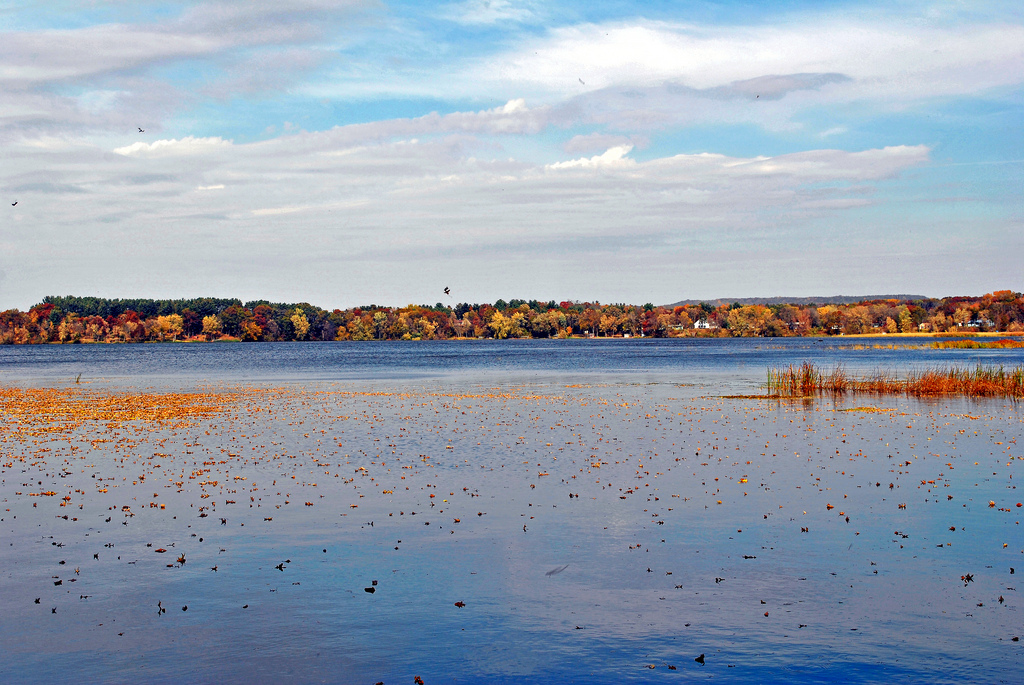
Tainter Lake

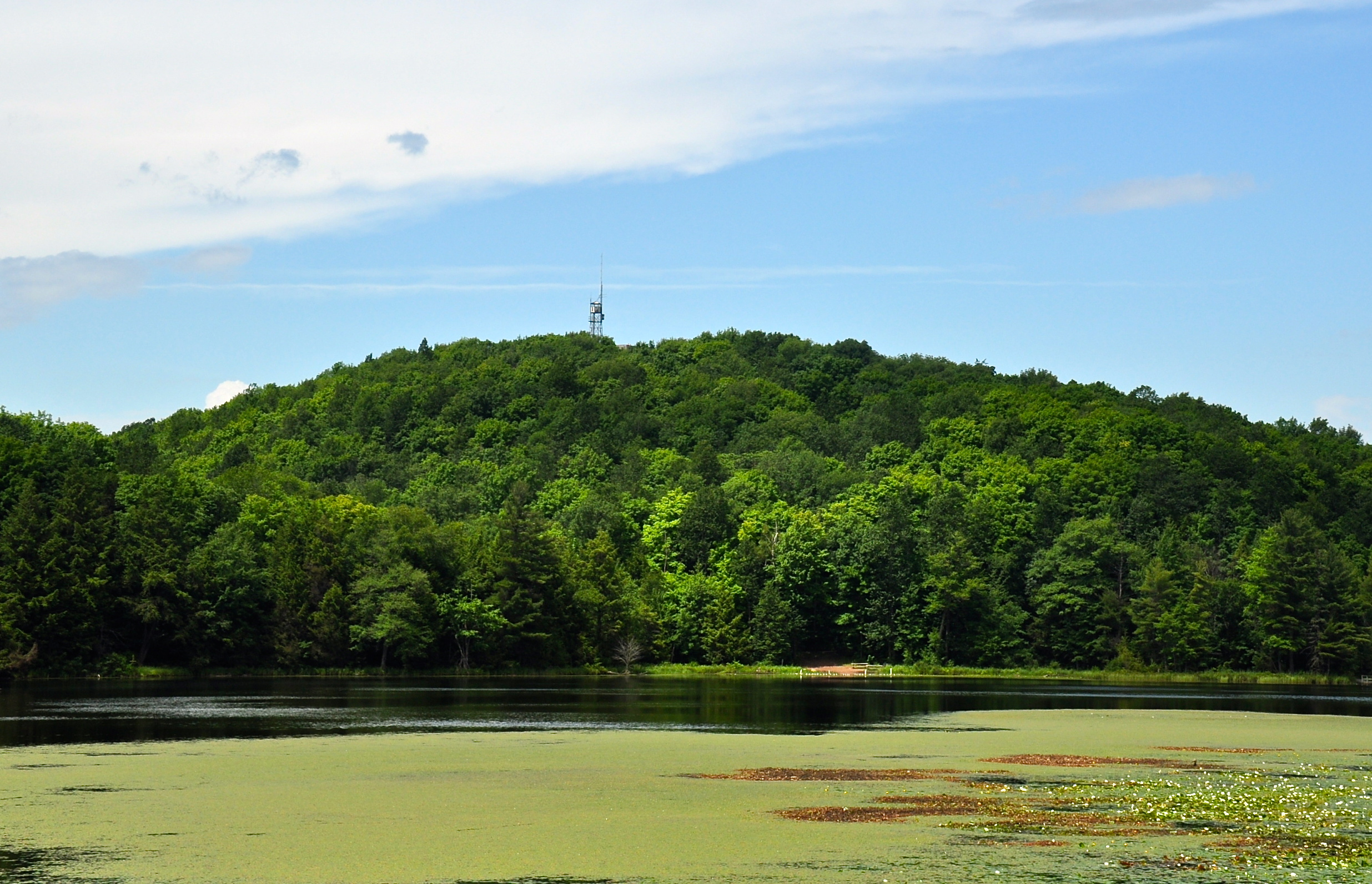
Timms Hill

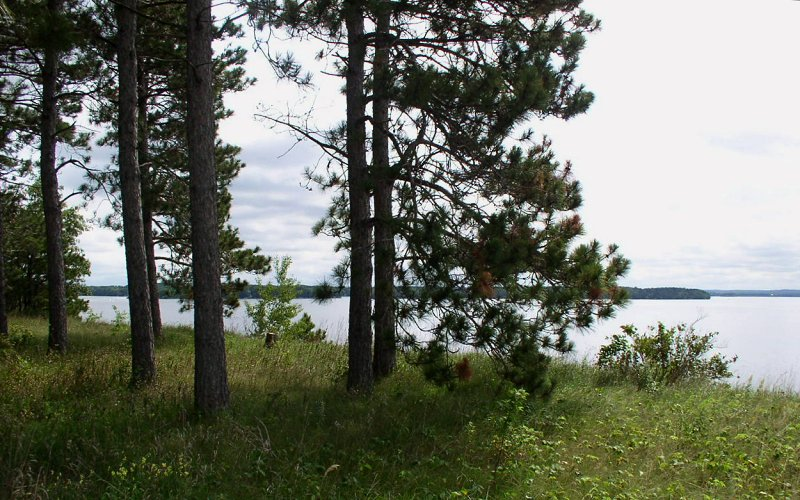
Lake Wissota State Park

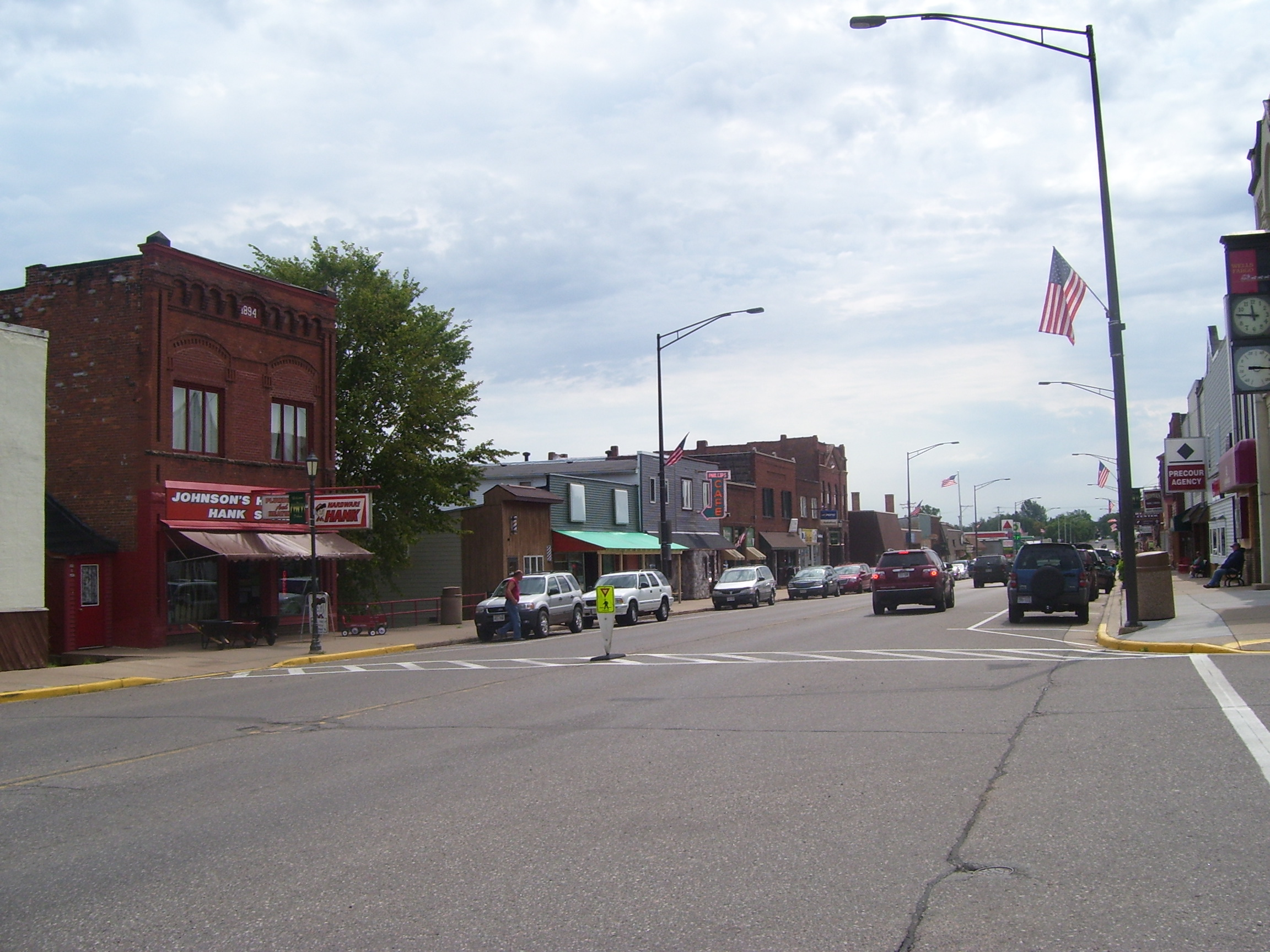
Phillips, Wisconsin

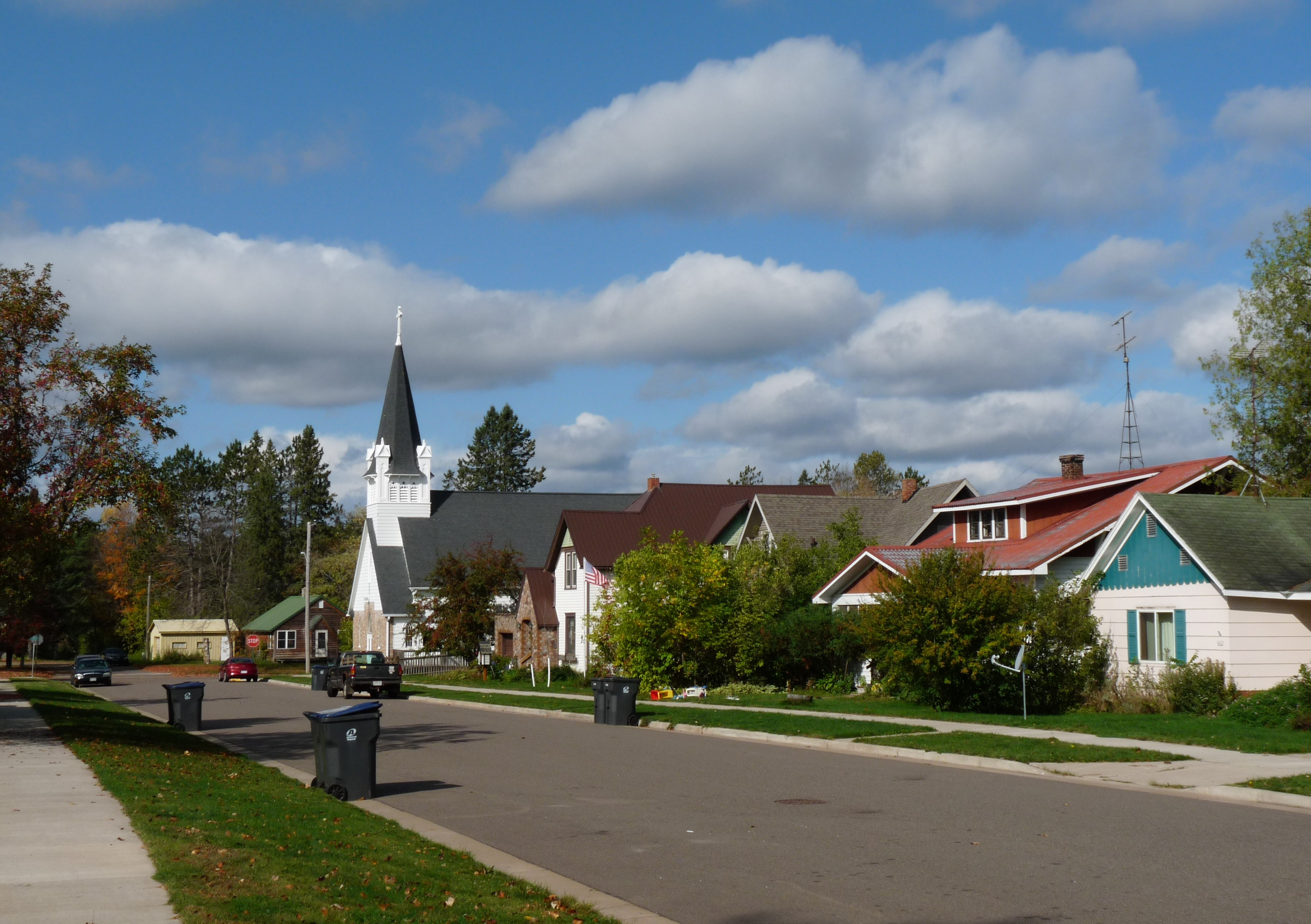
Prentice, Wisconsin

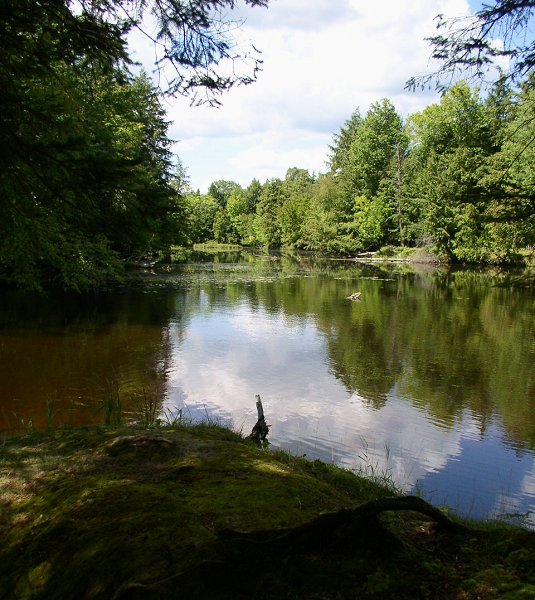
Brunet Island State Park

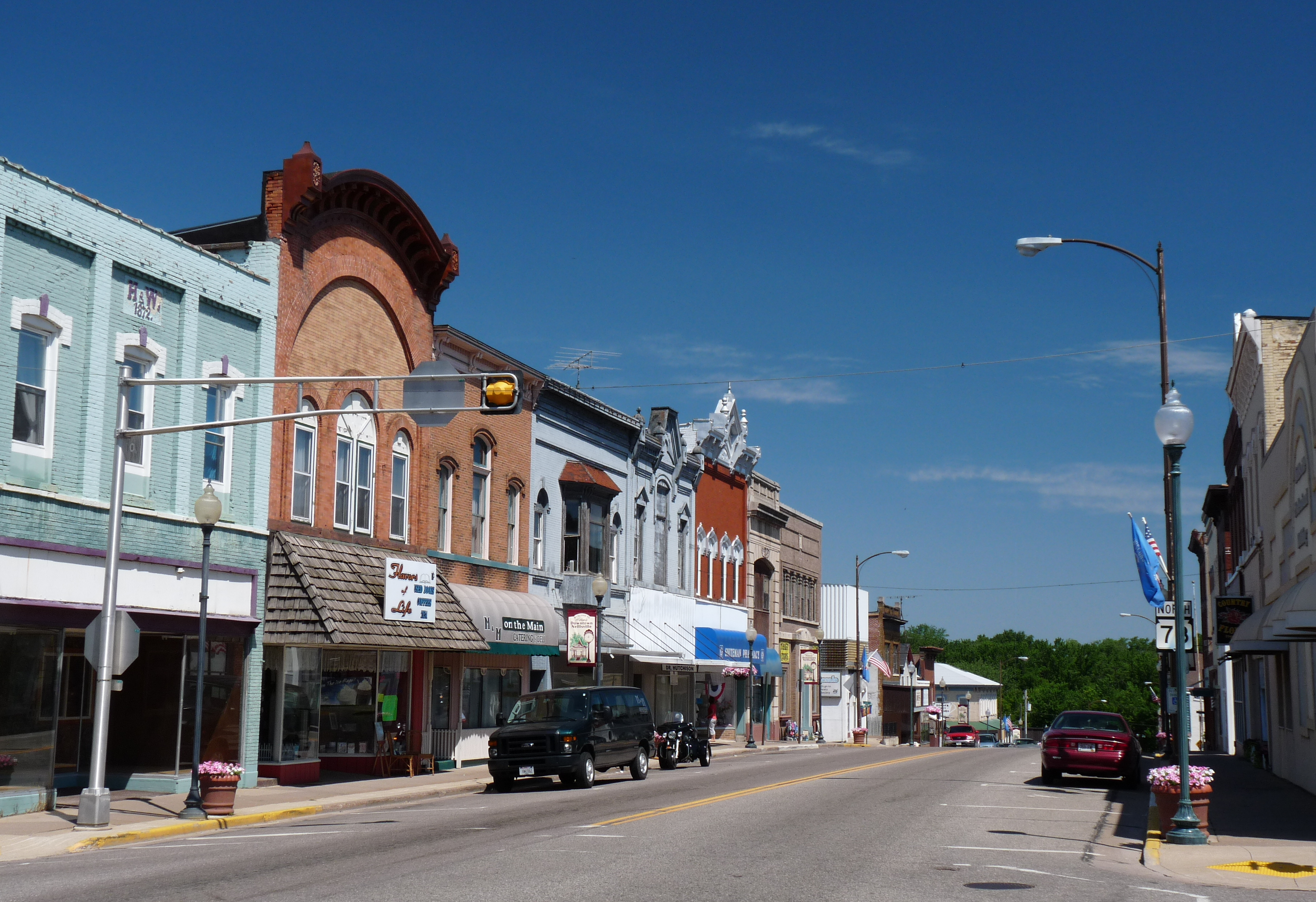
Neillsville Downtown Historic District

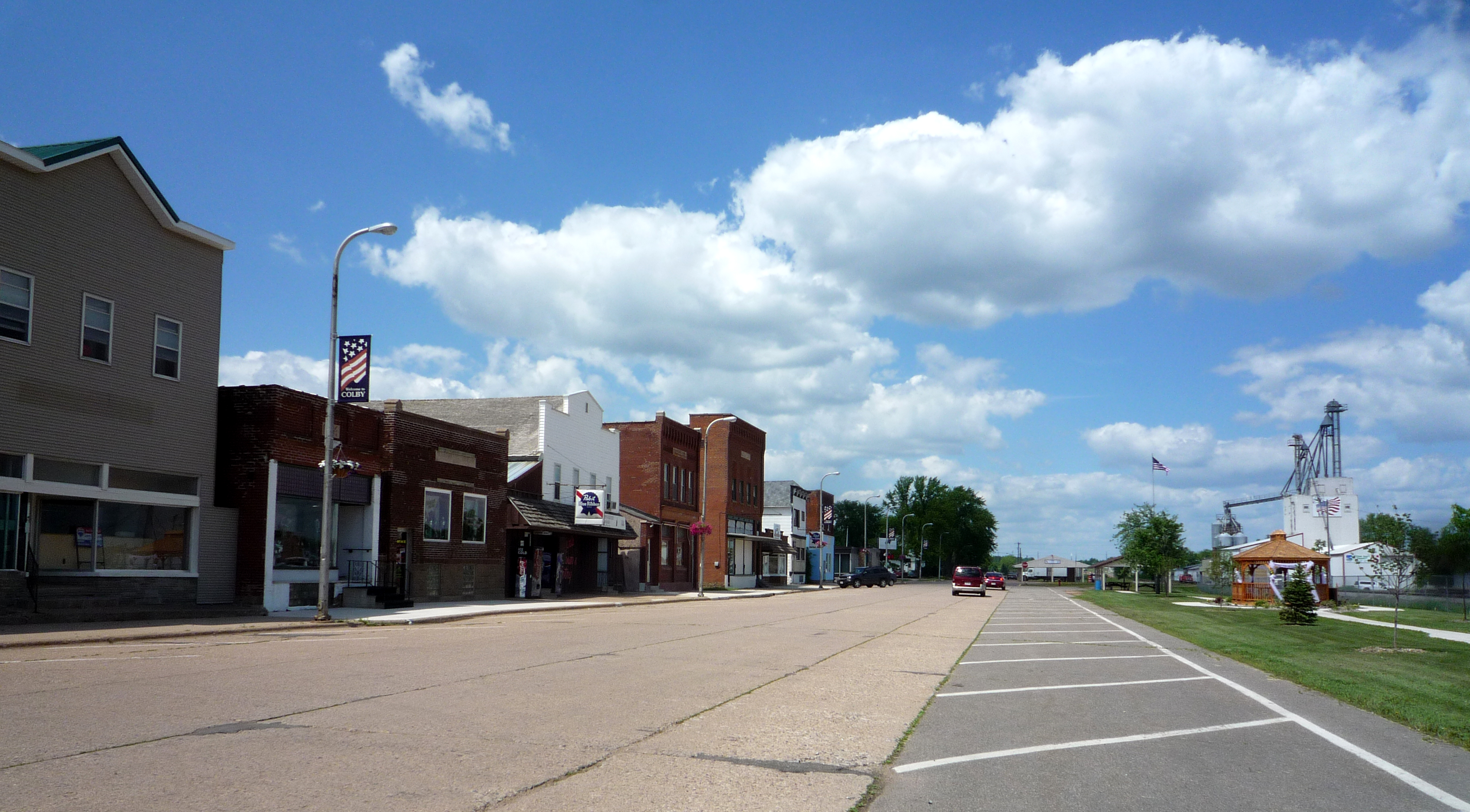
Downtown Colby

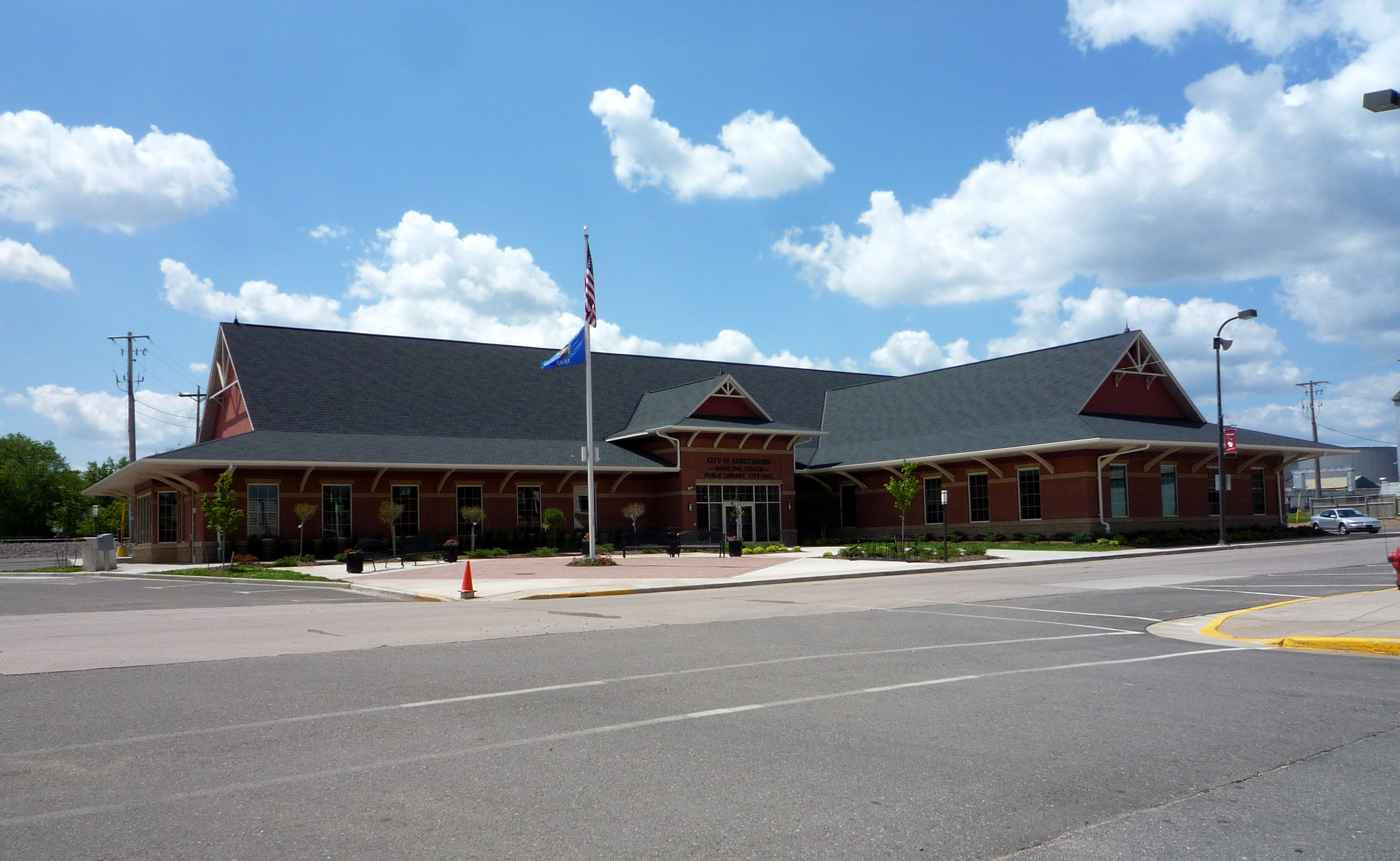
Abbotsford Municipal Center

== Past senators ==
The district has previously been represented by:

Note: the boundaries of districts have changed repeatedly over history. Previous politicians of a specific numbered district have represented a completely different geographic area, due to redistricting.

| Senator | Party | Notes | Session | Years | District Definition |
|---|---|---|---|---|---|
| District created by 1852 Wisc. Act 499. | | | | 1852 | Adams, Marquette, Sauk, Waushara counties |
| David Vittum | Dem. | | 6th | 1853 | Adams, Marquette, Sauk, Waushara counties |
| David Vittum | Dem. | | 7th | 1854 | Adams, Marquette, Sauk, Waushara counties |
| Edwin B. Kelsey | Dem. | | 8th | 1855 | Adams, Marquette, Sauk, Waushara counties |
| Edwin B. Kelsey | Dem. | | 9th | 1856 | Adams, Marquette, Sauk, Waushara counties |
| Samuel C. Bean | Rep. | | 10th | 1857 | Southern Jefferson County |
| Samuel C. Bean | Rep. | | 11th | 1858 | Southern Jefferson County |
| Enias D. Masters | Rep. | | 12th | 1859 | Southern Jefferson County |
| Enias D. Masters | Rep. | | 13th | 1860 | Southern Jefferson County |
| Edwin Montgomery | Rep. | | 14th | 1861 | Southern Jefferson County |
| Edwin Montgomery | Rep. | | 15th | 1862 | WI Senate District 23, 1862-1871 Jefferson County |
| J. D. Clapp | Dem. | | 16th | 1863 | WI Senate District 23, 1862-1871 Jefferson County |
| J. D. Clapp | Dem. | | 17th | 1864 | WI Senate District 23, 1862-1871 Jefferson County |
| S. W. Budlong | Dem. | | 18th | 1865 | WI Senate District 23, 1862-1871 Jefferson County |
| S. W. Budlong | Dem. | | 19th | 1866 | WI Senate District 23, 1862-1871 Jefferson County |
| Gerrit T. Thorn | Dem. | | 20th | 1867 | WI Senate District 23, 1862-1871 Jefferson County |
| Gerrit T. Thorn | Dem. | | 21st | 1868 | WI Senate District 23, 1862-1871 Jefferson County |
| William W. Woodman | Dem. | | 22nd | 1869 | WI Senate District 23, 1862-1871 Jefferson County |
| William W. Woodman | Dem. | | 23rd | 1870 | WI Senate District 23, 1862-1871 Jefferson County |
| William W. Woodman | Dem. | | 24th | 1871 | WI Senate District 23, 1862-1871 Jefferson County |
| William W. Woodman | Dem. | | 25th | 1872 | Jefferson County and Part of Dodge County: Wards 5, 6, City of Watertown |
| Walter S. Greene | Dem. | | 26th | 1873 | Jefferson County and Part of Dodge County: Wards 5, 6, City of Watertown |
| Walter S. Greene | Dem. | | 27th | 1874 | Jefferson County and Part of Dodge County: Wards 5, 6, City of Watertown |
| William W. Reed | Lib. Rep. | | 28th | 1875 | Jefferson County and Part of Dodge County: Wards 5, 6, City of Watertown |
| William W. Reed | Lib. Rep. | | 29th | 1876 | Jefferson County and Part of Dodge County: Wards 5, 6, City of Watertown |
| William W. Reed | Lib. Rep. | | 30th | 1877 | Jefferson County and Part of Dodge County: Wards 5, 6, City of Watertown |
| William W. Reed | Lib. Rep. | | 31st | 1878 | Jefferson County and Part of Dodge County: Wards 5, 6, City of Watertown |
| Charles H. Phillips | Rep. | Died Jan. 1879. | 32nd | 1879 | Jefferson County and Part of Dodge County: Wards 5, 6, City of Watertown |
| Joseph B. Bennett | Rep. | Won 1879 special election. | 32nd | 1879 | Jefferson County and Part of Dodge County: Wards 5, 6, City of Watertown |
| Joseph B. Bennett | Rep. | Won 1879 special election. | 33rd | 1880 | Jefferson County and Part of Dodge County: Wards 5, 6, City of Watertown |
| Frederick Kusel | Dem. | | 34th | 1881 | Jefferson County and Part of Dodge County: Wards 5, 6, City of Watertown |
| Frederick Kusel | Dem. | | 35th | 1882 | Jefferson County; 1880 population: 32,155 |
| William W. Reed | Dem. | | 36th | 1883–1884 | Jefferson County; 1880 population: 32,155 |
| William W. Reed | Dem. | | 37th | 1885–1886 | Jefferson County; 1880 population: 32,155 |
| Walter S. Greene | Dem. | Died Nov. 1891. | 38th | 1887–1888 | Jefferson County; 1880 population: 32,155 |
| Walter S. Greene | Dem. | Died Nov. 1891. | 39th | 1889–1890 | Jefferson County and Western Waukesha County: Town of Delafield; Town of Eagle; Town of Genesee; Town of Lisbon; Town of Merton; Town of Mukwonago; Town of Oconomowoc; Town of Ottawa; Town of Pewaukee; Town of Summit; City of Oconomowoc; 1890 population: 50,694 |
| Walter S. Greene | Dem. | Died Nov. 1891. | 40th | 1891–1892 | Jefferson County and Western Waukesha County: Town of Delafield; Town of Eagle; Town of Genesee; Town of Lisbon; Town of Merton; Town of Mukwonago; Town of Oconomowoc; Town of Ottawa; Town of Pewaukee; Town of Summit; City of Oconomowoc; 1890 population: 50,694 |
| --Vacant-- | | | 40th | 1891–1892 | Jefferson County and Western Waukesha County: Town of Delafield; Town of Eagle; Town of Genesee; Town of Lisbon; Town of Merton; Town of Mukwonago; Town of Oconomowoc; Town of Ottawa; Town of Pewaukee; Town of Summit; City of Oconomowoc; 1890 population: 50,694 |
| Albert Solliday | Dem. | Won May 1892 special election. | 40th | 1891–1892 | Jefferson County and Western Waukesha County: Town of Delafield; Town of Eagle; Town of Genesee; Town of Lisbon; Town of Merton; Town of Mukwonago; Town of Oconomowoc; Town of Ottawa; Town of Pewaukee; Town of Summit; City of Oconomowoc; 1890 population: 50,694 |
| Albert Solliday | Dem. | Won May 1892 special election. | 41st | 1893–1894 | Jefferson County and Western Waukesha County: Town of Delafield; Town of Eagle; Town of Genesee; Town of Lisbon; Town of Merton; Town of Mukwonago; Town of Oconomowoc; Town of Ottawa; Town of Pewaukee; Town of Summit; City of Oconomowoc; 1890 population: 50,694 |
| Albert Solliday | Dem. | Won May 1892 special election. | 42nd | 1895–1896 | Jefferson County and Western Waukesha County: Town of Delafield; Town of Eagle; Town of Genesee; Town of Lisbon; Town of Merton; Town of Mukwonago; Town of Oconomowoc; Town of Ottawa; Town of Pewaukee; Town of Summit; City of Oconomowoc; 1890 population: 50,694 |
| Albert Solliday | Dem. | Won May 1892 special election. | 43rd | 1897–1898 | Walworth County and Eastern Jefferson County; 1895 population: 47,449 |
| John H. Harris | Rep. | | 44th | 1899–1900 | Walworth County and Eastern Jefferson County; 1895 population: 47,449 |
| John H. Harris | Rep. | | 45th | 1901–1902 | Walworth County and Eastern Jefferson County; 1895 population: 47,449 |
| Zadoc P. Beach | Rep. | | 46th | 1903–1904 | Jefferson and Walworth counties 1900 population: 64,048 |
| Zadoc P. Beach | Rep. | | 47th | 1905–1906 | Jefferson and Walworth counties 1900 population: 64,048 |
| John A. Hazelwood | Dem. | | 48th | 1907–1908 | Jefferson and Walworth counties 1900 population: 64,048 |
| John A. Hazelwood | Dem. | | 49th | 1909–1910 | Jefferson and Walworth counties 1900 population: 64,048 |
| Charles A. Snover | Dem. | | 50th | 1911–1912 | Jefferson and Walworth counties 1900 population: 64,048 |
| Charles A. Snover | Dem. | | 51st | 1913–1914 | Portage and Waupaca counties 1910 population: 63,727 |
| Andrew R. Potts | Rep. | | 52nd | 1915–1916 | Portage and Waupaca counties 1910 population: 63,727 |
| Andrew R. Potts | Rep. | | 53rd | 1917–1918 | Portage and Waupaca counties 1910 population: 63,727 |
| Herman J. Severson | Rep. | | 54th | 1919–1920 | Portage and Waupaca counties 1910 population: 63,727 |
| Herman J. Severson | Rep. | | 55th | 1921–1922 | Portage and Waupaca counties 1910 population: 63,727 |
| Herman J. Severson | Rep. | | 56th | 1923–1924 | Portage and Waupaca counties 1910 population: 63,727 |
| Herman J. Severson | Rep. | | 57th | 1925–1926 | Portage and Waupaca counties 1910 population: 63,727 |
| Herman J. Severson | Rep. | | 58th | 1927–1928 | Portage and Waupaca counties 1910 population: 63,727 |
| Herman J. Severson | Rep. | | 59th | 1929–1930 | Portage and Waupaca counties 1910 population: 63,727 |
| Herman J. Severson | Rep. | | 60th | 1931–1932 | Portage and Waupaca counties 1910 population: 63,727 |
| Herman J. Severson | Rep. | | 61st | 1933–1934 | Portage and Waupaca counties 1910 population: 63,727 |
| Herman J. Severson | Prog. | | 62nd | 1935–1936 | Portage and Waupaca counties 1910 population: 63,727 |
| Herman J. Severson | Prog. | | 63rd | 1937–1938 | Portage and Waupaca counties 1910 population: 63,727 |
| Fred R. Fisher | Rep. | | 64th | 1939–1940 | Portage and Waupaca counties 1910 population: 63,727 |
| Fred R. Fisher | Rep. | | 65th | 1941–1942 | Portage and Waupaca counties 1910 population: 63,727 |
| Harley M. Jacklin | Dem. | | 66th | 1943–1944 | Portage and Waupaca counties 1910 population: 63,727 |
| Harley M. Jacklin | Dem. | | 67th | 1945–1946 | Portage and Waupaca counties 1910 population: 63,727 |
| Oscar W. Neale | Rep. | | 68th | 1947–1948 | Portage and Waupaca counties 1910 population: 63,727 |
| Oscar W. Neale | Rep. | | 69th | 1949–1950 | Portage and Waupaca counties 1910 population: 63,727 |
| Oscar W. Neale | Rep. | | 70th | 1951–1952 | Portage and Waupaca counties 1910 population: 63,727 |
| Oscar W. Neale | Rep. | | 71st | 1953–1954 | Portage and Waupaca counties 1910 population: 63,727 |
| Paul J. Rogan | Rep. | Won 1954 special election. Resigned 1956. | 72nd | 1955–1956 | Barron, Burnett, Polk, Rusk, Sawyer, Washburn counties |
| Holger Rasmusen | Rep. | Won 1956 special election. | 73rd | 1957–1958 | Barron, Burnett, Polk, Rusk, Sawyer, Washburn counties |
| Howard W. Cameron | Dem. | | 74th | 1959–1960 | Barron, Burnett, Polk, Rusk, Sawyer, Washburn counties |
| Howard W. Cameron | Dem. | | 75th | 1961–1962 | Barron, Burnett, Polk, Rusk, Sawyer, Washburn counties |
| Holger Rasmusen | Rep. | | 76th | 1963–1964 | Barron, Burnett, Polk, Rusk, Sawyer, Washburn counties |
| Holger Rasmusen | Rep. | | 77th | 1965–1966 | Barron, Chippewa, Dunn, Washburn counties |
| Holger Rasmusen | Rep. | | 78th | 1967–1968 | Barron, Chippewa, Dunn, Washburn counties |
| Holger Rasmusen | Rep. | | 79th | 1969–1970 | Barron, Chippewa, Dunn, Washburn counties |
| Bruce Peloquin | Dem. | | 80th | 1971–1972 | Barron, Chippewa, Dunn, Washburn counties |
| Bruce Peloquin | Dem. | | 81st | 1973–1974 | Most of Chippewa County; Most of Dunn County; Northwest Eau Claire County; Part of Pepin County |
| Bruce Peloquin | Dem. | | 82nd | 1975–1976 | Most of Chippewa County; Most of Dunn County; Northwest Eau Claire County; Part of Pepin County |
| Bruce Peloquin | Dem. | | 83rd | 1977–1978 | Most of Chippewa County; Most of Dunn County; Northwest Eau Claire County; Part of Pepin County |
| Marvin J. Roshell | Dem. | Resigned Dec. 1992. | 84th | 1979–1980 | Most of Chippewa County; Most of Dunn County; Northwest Eau Claire County; Part of Pepin County |
| Marvin J. Roshell | Dem. | Resigned Dec. 1992. | 85th | 1981–1982 | Most of Chippewa County; Most of Dunn County; Northwest Eau Claire County; Part of Pepin County |
| Marvin J. Roshell | Dem. | Resigned Dec. 1992. | 86th | 1983–1984 | |
| Marvin J. Roshell | Dem. | Resigned Dec. 1992. | 87th | 1985–1986 | |
| Marvin J. Roshell | Dem. | Resigned Dec. 1992. | 88th | 1987–1988 | |
| Marvin J. Roshell | Dem. | Resigned Dec. 1992. | 89th | 1989–1990 | |
| Marvin J. Roshell | Dem. | Resigned Dec. 1992. | 90th | 1991–1992 | |
| --Vacant-- | | | 91st | 1993–1994 | Chippewa, Clark counties Most of Dunn County; Parts of Eau Claire County; Southwest Marathon County; Part of Wood County |
| David Zien | Rep. | Win 1993 special election. | 91st | 1993–1994 | Chippewa, Clark counties Most of Dunn County; Parts of Eau Claire County; Southwest Marathon County; Part of Wood County |
| David Zien | Rep. | Win 1993 special election. | 92nd | 1995–1996 | Chippewa, Clark counties Most of Dunn County; Parts of Eau Claire County; Southwest Marathon County; Part of Wood County |
| David Zien | Rep. | Win 1993 special election. | 93rd | 1997–1998 | Chippewa, Clark counties Most of Dunn County; Parts of Eau Claire County; Southwest Marathon County; Part of Wood County |
| David Zien | Rep. | Win 1993 special election. | 94th | 1999–2000 | Chippewa, Clark counties Most of Dunn County; Parts of Eau Claire County; Southwest Marathon County; Part of Wood County |
| David Zien | Rep. | Win 1993 special election. | 95th | 2001–2002 | Chippewa, Clark counties Most of Dunn County; Parts of Eau Claire County; Southwest Marathon County; Part of Wood County |
| David Zien | Rep. | Win 1993 special election. | 96th | 2003–2004 | Chippewa County; Most of Clark County; Northern Dunn County; Northern Eau Claire County; Southwest Marathon County; Southeast Barron County; Part of Taylor County; Part of Wood County |
| David Zien | Rep. | Win 1993 special election. | 97th | 2005–2006 | Chippewa County; Most of Clark County; Northern Dunn County; Northern Eau Claire County; Southwest Marathon County; Southeast Barron County; Part of Taylor County; Part of Wood County |
| Pat Kreitlow | Dem. | Won 2006 election. Lost 2010 election. | 98th | 2007–2008 | Chippewa County; Most of Clark County; Northern Dunn County; Northern Eau Claire County; Southwest Marathon County; Southeast Barron County; Part of Taylor County; Part of Wood County |
| Pat Kreitlow | Dem. | Won 2006 election. Lost 2010 election. | 99th | 2009–2010 | Chippewa County; Most of Clark County; Northern Dunn County; Northern Eau Claire County; Southwest Marathon County; Southeast Barron County; Part of Taylor County; Part of Wood County |
| Terry Moulton | Rep. | | 100th | 2011–2012 | Chippewa County; Most of Clark County; Northern Dunn County; Northern Eau Claire County; Southwest Marathon County; Southeast Barron County; Part of Taylor County; Part of Wood County |
| Terry Moulton | Rep. | | 101st | 2013–2014 | Chippewa County; Most of Clark County; Northeast Dunn County; Eastern Eau Claire County; Southwest Marathon County; Northwest Wood County; Part of Jackson County; Part of Trempealeau County |
| Terry Moulton | Rep. | | 102nd | 2015–2016 | Chippewa County; Most of Clark County; Northeast Dunn County; Eastern Eau Claire County; Southwest Marathon County; Northwest Wood County; Part of Jackson County; Part of Trempealeau County |
| Terry Moulton | Rep. | | 103rd | 2017–2018 | Chippewa County; Most of Clark County; Northeast Dunn County; Eastern Eau Claire County; Southwest Marathon County; Northwest Wood County; Part of Jackson County; Part of Trempealeau County |
| Kathy Bernier | Rep. | | 104th | 2019–2020 | Chippewa County; Most of Clark County; Northeast Dunn County; Eastern Eau Claire County; Southwest Marathon County; Northwest Wood County; Part of Jackson County; Part of Trempealeau County |
| Kathy Bernier | Rep. | | 105th | 2021–2022 | Chippewa County; Most of Clark County; Northeast Dunn County; Eastern Eau Claire County; Southwest Marathon County; Northwest Wood County; Part of Jackson County; Part of Trempealeau County |
| Jesse James | Rep. | Elected 2022. | 106th | 2023–2024 | Chippewa & Clark counties, northeast Dunn County, half of Eau Claire County, southwest Marathon County, parts of Jackson County, parts of Wood County |
| Jesse James | Rep. | Elected 2022. | 107th | 2025–2026 | |
