= Charles Pettibone =

19th century American politician

Charles A. Pettibone

Member of the Wisconsin Senate from the 13th district
- In office January 3, 1887 – January 5, 1891
- Preceded by: Benjamin F. Sherman
- Succeeded by: William Voss

Personal details
- Born: May 26, 1841 Hartsville, New York, U.S.
- Died: November 30, 1925 (aged 84)
- Resting place: Forest Mound Cemetery, Waupun, Wisconsin
- Party: Republican
- Spouse: Emily Maria Brown (died 1907)
- Children: 5 children

Military service
- Allegiance: United States
- Branch/service: United States Volunteers; Union Army
- Years of service: 1861–1865
- Rank: Captain, USV
- Unit: 1st Reg. Wis. Vol. Cavalry
- Battles/wars: American Civil War

Charles Alexander Pettibone (May 26, 1841 – November 30, 1925) was an American newspaper editor and Republican politician. He served four years in the Wisconsin State Senate, representing Dodge County, and was later sergeant-at-arms of that body. During the American Civil War, he served as a Union Army cavalry officer.

== Early life ==
Pettibone was born on May 26, 1841, in Hartsville, New York. His family moved to Beaver Dam, Wisconsin, in 1850. Pettibone attended public schools, and obtained what was described as a "partial collegiate education" in the Wayland Academy and Lawrence University.

During the American Civil War, he enlisted on August 15, 1851, in Company C of the 1st Wisconsin Cavalry Regiment of the Union Army. He served as private and second lieutenant, eventually reaching the rank of captain. He took part in most of the engagements in which the regiment participated, and was mustered out of service on March 7, 1865.

Pettibone returned to Wisconsin, where for a while he tried his hand at teaching and farming. On May 26, 1865, Pettibone married Emily Maria Brown. They had five children.

== Newspaper publishing ==
During the War, Pettibone had published a newspaper for his unit while they were stationed in Cleveland, Tennessee. He began publishing the weekly New London News at New London in 1874; when that failed, he started The Telephone, later the Juneau Telephone, at Mayville in 1877.

== Political career ==
Pettibone had recently purchased the Horicon Reporter in Horicon in 1886 when he was elected for the 13th District of the Senate (Dodge County) as an Independent for a four-year term of office, receiving 4,621 votes, against 3,722 votes for Jacob Beldon (political affiliation unknown), and 337 votes for Prohibitionist Oliver H. Crowl (Democratic incumbent Benjamin Sherman was not a candidate). He served on the standing committee on railroads, and as chairman of the joint committee on printing.

He was not a candidate for re-election in 1890, and was succeeded by Democrat William Voss. He became sergeant-at-arms of the Senate as of the 1895 session. In 1896, he attempted to return to his old Senate seat, running as a Republican; but lost to Democrat Michael Burke, with 4240 votes to Burke's 4945 and Populist Charles Williams' 170.

By 1897, while he was still sergeant-at-arms (and Stanley Pettibone, "student", was a messenger on his staff), he had sold the Reporter and moved to Oconomowoc, where he and his sons Daniel and Stanley, operating as Pettibone & Pettibone, published the Oconomowoc Republican, which had been the Oconomowoc Democrat until they purchased and renamed it. He retained his office until the Senate's 1903 session.

== Later life ==
About that time, the Pettibones sold the Republican and purchased the Watertown Republican, which they operated for two years before selling it. He then moved to Waupun, where he assisted Wilford A. Sanborn, proprietor of the Waupun Leader and husband of Pettibone's daughter Hannah.

Pettibone was a Freemason, an Odd Fellow, and a member of the Grand Army of the Republic. In March 1917, a letter from Pettibone was published in The Weekly Republican. a newspaper in Cape Girardeau, Missouri, in which Pettibone wrote how the recent American entry into "the war in Europe" (World War I) reminded him of his own early days as a green volunteer, concluding, ‘We thought we were having some army experiences while there, but in comparison with our service after we were assigned and reported for duty in the Department of the Cumberland, it was a picnic."

He died on November 30, 1925, and is buried with Emily (died April 1937) in Forest Mound Cemetery in Waupun.

Wisconsin Senate
Preceded by Benjamin F. Sherman	Member of the Wisconsin Senate from the 13th district January 3, 1887 – January 5, 1891	Succeeded by William Voss
