= William Woodman =

William Woodman may refer to:

- William Robert Woodman, co-founder of the Hermetic Order of the Golden Dawn
- William W. Woodman, American politician in Wisconsin

== See also ==
- William Woodman Graham, British mountaineer
