= Marvin J. Roshell =

American politician (1932–2022)

Member of the Wisconsin Senate from the 23rd district
- In office January 1, 1979 – December 29, 1992
- Preceded by: Bruce Peloquin
- Succeeded by: David A. Zien

Personal details
- Born: October 27, 1932 Chippewa Falls, Wisconsin, U.S.
- Died: March 9, 2022 (aged 89) Chippewa Falls, Wisconsin, U.S.
- Party: Democratic
- Spouse: Barbara "Bobbie" Tompkins (m. 1954)
- Children: 3
- Education: Coyne College
- Profession: Electrician, politician

Military service
- Allegiance: United States
- Branch/service: United States Air Force
- Years of service: 1950–1954
- Battles/wars: Korean War

Marvin J. Roshell (October 27, 1932 – March 9, 2022) was an American electrician, small business owner, and Democratic politician. He served 14 years in the Wisconsin State Senate, representing the 23rd Senate district in western Wisconsin.

== Early life and career ==
Roshell was born on October 27, 1932, in Chippewa Falls, Wisconsin. He graduated from Cadott High School in Cadott, Wisconsin, and enlisted in the United States Air Force at age 18. He served from 1950 to 1954, including duties in the Korean War, and afterwards attended Coyne Electrical College. He worked as an electrician and contractor at Roshell Electric, which was owned by his father and uncle. In 1968, he and his brother, Eugene, along with their cousins Bill and John Roshell, bought the business from their fathers.

== Political career ==
In 1969, Roshell was elected along with Carmen Muenich in the election for the Lafayette town board. Roshell was elected to the Senate in 1978. Later, he served as Majority Caucus Secretary and Majority Caucus Chairperson. Previously, he had been a member of the Lafayette Board of Supervisors from 1969 to 1979, serving as Chairperson from 1975 to 1979. He was a Democrat.

In December 1992, Roshell announced he would resign from the Senate to accept an appointment in the administration of Governor Tommy Thompson. He was appointed administrator of the Safety and Buildings Division within the Wisconsin Department of Industry, Labor & Human Relations. Roshell was considered a conservative Democrat while serving in the Senate, and his appointment to a state job in a Republican administration was considered a political ploy to flip the closely divided State Senate from Democratic to Republican control.

Roshell retired three years later. At the time of his retirement, there was a small scandal around the size of the retirement benefits paid to former legislators who had also worked as state employees.

== Personal life ==
While they were both serving in the U.S. Air Force, Roshell met Barbara "Bobbie" Tompkins, of Morrison, Colorado. They married at Cadott, Wisconsin, on July 24, 1954, and now have three adult children. A few years after his retirement, Marvin and Barbara moved to Hot Springs, Arkansas. Roshell Electric Inc. remains a family-owned business, now run by Roshell's sons and nephews.

He was a member of the American Legion, the Veterans of Foreign Wars, and the AFL-CIO.

He died in Chippewa Falls on March 9, 2022, at the age of 89.

Wisconsin Senate
Preceded by Bruce Peloquin	Member of the Wisconsin Senate from the 23rd district January 1, 1979 – December 29, 1992	Succeeded by David A. Zien
