= William W. Woodman =

19th century American politician

Member of the Wisconsin Senate from the 23rd district
- In office January 4, 1869 – January 6, 1873
- Preceded by: Gerrit T. Thorn
- Succeeded by: Walter S. Greene

Member of the Wisconsin State Assembly from the Jefferson 4th district
- In office January 7, 1856 – January 5, 1857
- Preceded by: John Gibb
- Succeeded by: William M. Morse
- In office January 3, 1853 – January 2, 1854
- Preceded by: District established
- Succeeded by: Charles J. Bell

Personal details
- Born: March 24, 1818 Rodman, New York, U.S.
- Died: February 26, 1901 (aged 82) La Prairie, Wisconsin, U.S.
- Party: Democratic
- Children: C. B. Woodman

William Wallace Woodman (March 24, 1818 – February 26, 1901) was an American lawyer, farmer, Democratic politician, and Wisconsin pioneer. He served four years in the Wisconsin State Senate and two years in the State Assembly, representing Jefferson County.

== Biography ==
William W. Woodman was born in the town of Rodman, New York, on March 24, 1818. He came to the Wisconsin Territory in 1839, settling first in Rock County. He relocated to Farmington, in Jefferson County, in 1844. For over 40 years he was justice of the peace at Johnson Creek, Wisconsin.

Woodman was active in the Democratic Party of Wisconsin. He was a member of the Wisconsin State Assembly in the 1853 and 1856 sessions, representing northeast Jefferson County. He was subsequently elected to the Wisconsin State Senate in 1868 and 1870, serving from 1869 through 1872.

Woodman died on February 26, 1901, at the home of his son in La Prairie, Wisconsin.

Wisconsin State Assembly
| New district established (1852 Wisc. Act 499) | Member of the Wisconsin State Assembly from the Jefferson 4th district January 3, 1853 – January 2, 1854 | Succeeded by Charles J. Bell |
| Preceded by John Gibb | Member of the Wisconsin State Assembly from the Jefferson 4th district January 7, 1856 – January 5, 1857 | Succeeded by William M. Morse |
Wisconsin Senate
| Preceded by Gerrit T. Thorn | Member of the Wisconsin Senate from the 23rd district January 4, 1869 – January 6, 1873 | Succeeded by Walter S. Greene |
