= Matthias J. Regan =

Wisconsin politician (1848–1931)

Matthias J. Regan (sometimes spelled Mathias; February 16, 1848 – January 5, 1931) was a member of the Wisconsin State Assembly.

== Biography ==
Regan was born on February 16, 1848, in what is now Eagle (town), Wisconsin. He married Julia Dalo. They had four children. Regan died in 1931.

== Career ==
Regan was a member of the Assembly in 1883. Other positions he held include town clerk and chairman of the town board (similar to city council) of Eagle and member of the county board of supervisors of Waukesha County, Wisconsin. He was a Democrat.
