= William W. Reed =

American politician

William W. Reed (February 8, 1825 - 1916) was an American physician and politician from Jefferson, Wisconsin who served as a member of the Wisconsin State Assembly and the Wisconsin State Senate.

== Background ==
Reed was born in Versailles in Darke County, Ohio on February 8, 1825; he received an academic education and became a physician by trade.

He came to Wisconsin in 1849, and settled at Jefferson, where he held various local public offices, including district clerk, city treasurer and county supervisor; was president of the board of trustees of Jefferson Liberal Institute.

== Legislative and medical careers ==
He was first elected to the Assembly from the third Jefferson County district (the Towns of Hebron, Jefferson, Sumner, Koshkonong, and Cold Spring) as a member of the Republican Party. He was succeeded by fellow Republican Lucien B. Caswell.

He served as an examining surgeon for the draft of 1863; and was once more elected to his old Assembly district for the 1866 and 1867 sessions, being succeeded by Democrat Jonas Folts.

He was a member of the State Board of Charities and Reform for multiple terms, beginning in 1874, in which role he was instrumental in fostering the idea of establishing county insane asylums. He left a manuscript account of this campaign, now in the archives of the Wisconsin Historical Society.

He was elected in 1874 as a Liberal Republican to the Senate's 23rd District (Jefferson County and the 5th and 6th Wards of Watertown, as part of a short-lived coalition of Democrats, reform and Liberal Republicans, and Grangers formed in 1873. He was re-elected as a Liberal Republican in 1876, again defeating a regular Republican (although the Reform Party was breaking down).

He continued to work as a physician in such jobs as office physician for an Odd Fellows' mutual life insurance company and physician to the Jefferson County insane asylum. He was elected mayor of the city of Jefferson in 1882, '83 and '84.

In 1882 he was elected again to the 23rd Senate District (now simply Jefferson County), this time as a Democrat, receiving 2,940 votes to 1,953 for Republican Jesse Stone and 418 for Prohibitionist Robert Fargo. He was not a candidate for re-election in 1886, and was succeeded by fellow Democrat Walter S. Greene.

== After the Senate ==
Reed continued in practice of medicine. In December 1903, he was elected the first President of the newly organized Jefferson County medical society. He was still practicing at least through 1908. He died in 1916.
