= Nathan S. Greene =

American businessman, politician (1810–1900)

Member of the Wisconsin State Assembly from the Jefferson 2nd district
- In office January 5, 1863 – January 4, 1864
- Preceded by: Walter S. Greene
- Succeeded by: Aaron B. Smith

Personal details
- Born: January 21, 1810 Saratoga County, New York, U.S.
- Died: October 4, 1900 (aged 90) Fort Atkinson, Wisconsin, U.S.
- Resting place: Evergreen Cemetery, Fort Atkinson, Wisconsin
- Party: Republican
- Occupation: Businessman

Nathan S. Greene (January 21, 1810 – October 4, 1900) was an American businessman and Republican politician. He served one term in the Wisconsin State Assembly, representing Jefferson County.

== Biography ==
Born in Saratoga County, New York, Greene moved to Milwaukee, Wisconsin Territory, and then to Milford, Wisconsin, where he owned a general store and operated a lumber and milling business. In 1863, Greene served in the Wisconsin State Assembly and was a Republican. During the American Civil War, Greene served as a draft commissioner. In 1884, Greene moved to Fort Atkinson, Wisconsin, where he owned a dairy. Greene died in Fort Atkinson, Wisconsin.

Wisconsin State Assembly
Preceded by Walter S. Greene	Member of the Wisconsin State Assembly from the Jefferson 2nd district January 5, 1863 – January 4, 1864	Succeeded by Aaron B. Smith
