= Walter S. Greene =

19th century American politician

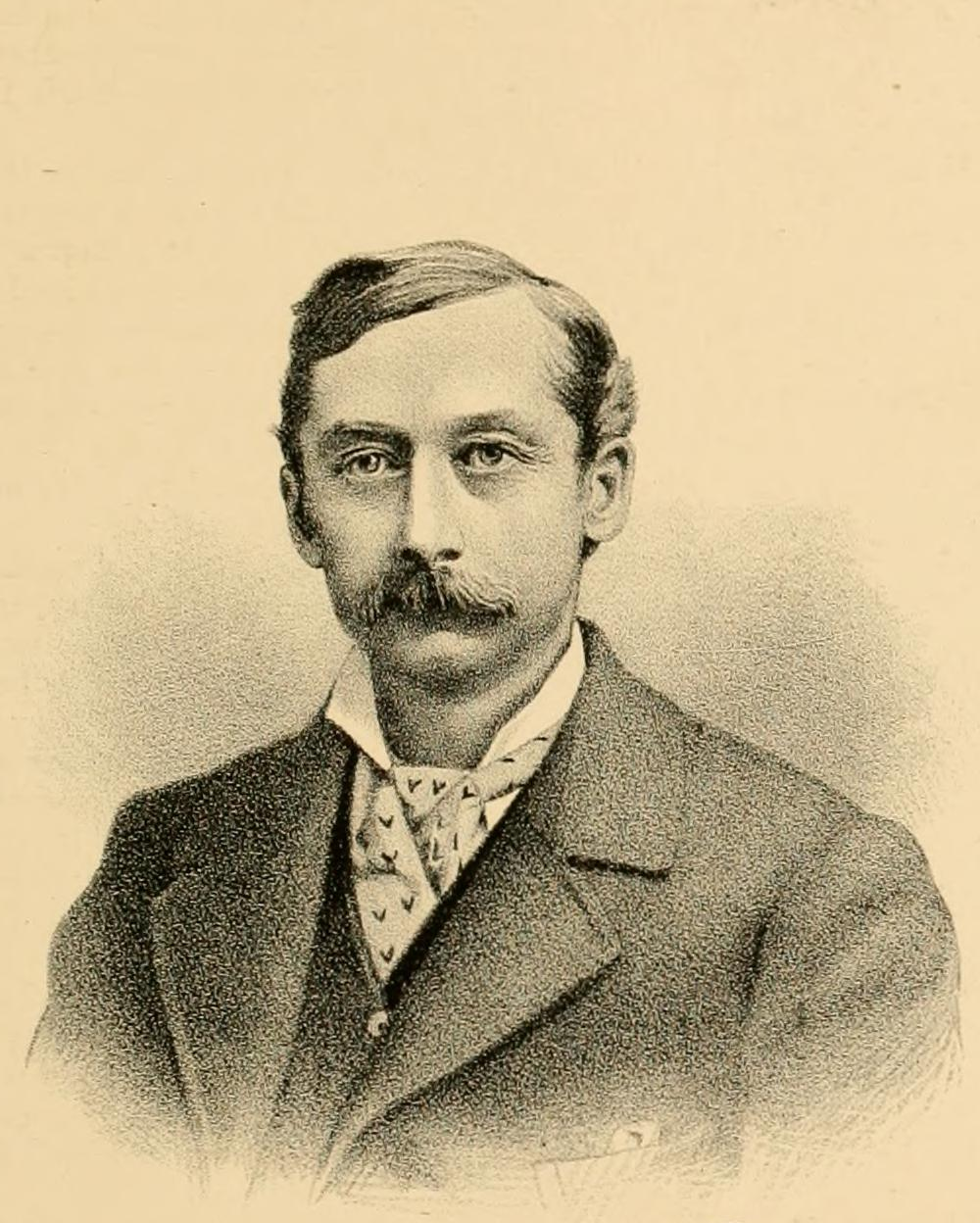
- Portrait from The History of Jefferson County, Wisconsin (1879)

Member of the Wisconsin Senate from the 23rd district
- In office January 3, 1887 – November 15, 1891
- Preceded by: William W. Reed
- Succeeded by: Albert Solliday
- In office January 6, 1873 – January 4, 1875
- Preceded by: William W. Woodman
- Succeeded by: William W. Reed

Member of the Wisconsin State Assembly from the Jefferson 2nd district
- In office January 6, 1862 – January 5, 1863
- Preceded by: Horace B. Willard
- Succeeded by: Nathan S. Greene

Personal details
- Born: March 23, 1834 Salisbury, Herkimer County, New York, U.S.
- Died: November 15, 1891 (aged 57) Milwaukee, Wisconsin, U.S.
- Cause of death: Stomach cancer
- Resting place: Evergreen Cemetery, Fort Atkinson, Wisconsin
- Party: Democratic
- Spouses: Ella C. Potter (m. 1861; died 1863); Jennette Guile (m. 1866–1891)
- Children: Isabella P. Greene; (b. 1862; died 1917)
- Parent: Nathan S. Greene (father)

Walter S. Greene (May 28, 1834 – November 15, 1891) was an American businessman, Democratic politician, and Wisconsin pioneer. He served six years in the Wisconsin State Senate and one year in the State Assembly, representing Jefferson County.

== Biography ==
Walter Greene was born in Salisbury, in Herkimer County, New York, March 23, 1834. He came west with his family in 1846, settling at the town of Milford, in the Wisconsin Territory. He attended collegiate courses at the University of Wisconsin and Beloit College and worked as a merchant for several years at Prairie du Chien, Wisconsin. He subsequently returned to Milford and worked with his father in a milling and manufacturing firm known as "Greene & Son".

While residing at Milford, he served on the town board for several years, served as Jefferson County treasurer, and was elected to the Wisconsin State Assembly for the 1862 session. He was succeeded in office in 1863 by his father, Nathan S. Greene. He was subsequently elected to the Wisconsin State Senate from Jefferson County's Senate district in 1872.

In May 1883, he moved to Fort Atkinson, Wisconsin, and was elected to another term in the Wisconsin Senate in 1886. The next year, he was elected mayor of Fort Atkinson. He was re-elected in 1890, but was stricken with stomach cancer shortly after the start of the new term. He was ill for several months before dying at St. Mary's hospital in Milwaukee in November 1891.

== Personal life and family ==
Walter Greene's father Nathan S. Greene also served in the Wisconsin State Assembly. Walter's younger brother William served as an officer in the Union Army during the American Civil War.

Walter Greene married twice. His first wife, Ella Porter, was the daughter of General James Potter, of Mifflin County, Pennsylvania, and was a great granddaughter of American Revolutionary War major general James Potter. They had one daughter together.

Walter Greene was survived by his second wife, Jennette Guile, and his daughter Isabella "Belle".

== Electoral history ==
=== Wisconsin Senate (1872) ===
Wisconsin Senate, 23rd District Election, 1872
Party	Candidate	Votes	%	±%
General Election, November 5, 1872
Democratic	Walter S. Greene	3,983	60.76%	+3.67%
Republican	Luther A. Cole	2,572	39.24%	
Plurality		1,411	21.53%	+7.34%
Total votes		6,555	100.0%	+34.19%
Democratic hold				

=== Wisconsin Senate (1886, 1890) ===
Wisconsin Senate, 23rd District Election, 1886
Party	Candidate	Votes	%	±%
General Election, November 2, 1886
Democratic	Walter S. Greene	3,601	56.93%	+1.58%
Republican	James W. Ostrander	2,464	38.96%	+2.18%
Prohibition	George W. Jenkins	260	4.11%	−3.76%
Plurality		1,137	17.98%	-0.61%
Total votes		6,325	100.0%	+19.09%
Democratic hold				

Wisconsin Senate, 23rd District Election, 1890
Party	Candidate	Votes	%	±%
General Election, November 4, 1890
Democratic	Walter S. Greene (incumbent)	3,983	60.76%	+3.83%
Republican	Jesse Stone	2,572	39.24%	+0.28%
Prohibition	S. Faville	319	4.64%	+0.53%
Plurality		1,411	21.53%	+3.55%
Total votes		6,874	100.0%	+8.68%
Democratic hold				

Wisconsin State Assembly
Preceded by Horace B. Willard	Member of the Wisconsin State Assembly from the Jefferson 2nd district January 6, 1862 – January 5, 1863	Succeeded by Nathan S. Greene
Wisconsin Senate
Preceded by William W. Woodman	Member of the Wisconsin State Assembly from the 23rd district January 6, 1873 – January 4, 1875	Succeeded by William W. Reed
Preceded by Albert Solliday	Member of the Wisconsin State Assembly from the 23rd district January 3, 1887 – November 15, 1891	Succeeded by William W. Reed
