= Albert Solliday =

American dentist, soldier and politician (1841–1924)

Member of the Wisconsin Senate from the 23rd district
- In office May 30, 1892 – January 2, 1899
- Preceded by: Walter S. Greene
- Succeeded by: John H. Harris

24th Mayor of Watertown, Wisconsin
- In office April 1884 – April 1886
- Preceded by: William H. Rohr
- Succeeded by: William F. Voss

Personal details
- Born: February 13, 1841 Lehigh County, Pennsylvania, U.S.
- Died: December 13, 1924 (aged 83) Watertown, Wisconsin, U.S.
- Resting place: Oak Hill Cemetery, Watertown, Wisconsin
- Party: Democratic
- Spouse: Elizabeth Jones (m. 1869; died 1908)

Military service
- Allegiance: United States
- Branch/service: United States Volunteers; Union Army; Wisconsin National Guard
- Years of service: 1862–1865 (USV); 1882–1898 (WNG); 1898 (USV); 1899–1901 (WNG)
- Rank: Lt. Colonel, USV; Brig. General, WNG
- Unit: 114th Reg. Oh. Vol. Infantry; 2nd Reg. Wis. Vol. Infantry
- Battles/wars: American Civil War; Spanish–American War

Albert A. Solliday (February 13, 1841 – December 13, 1924) was an American dentist, soldier, and Democratic politician. He was the 24th mayor of Watertown, Wisconsin, and represented Jefferson County in the Wisconsin Senate from 1892 to 1899. He served as a Union Army volunteer in the American Civil War and the Spanish–American War, and was later a general in the Wisconsin National Guard.

== Biography ==
Born in Lehigh County, Pennsylvania, Solliday graduated from Circleville High School in Circleville, Ohio. During the American Civil War, Solliday served as a musician in Company A of the 114th Ohio Infantry Regiment. He remained through the entire service of the regiment, from Fall 1862 through July 1865.

In 1868, Solliday moved to Watertown, Wisconsin where he worked in the dentistry profession. Solliday served on the Watertown school board and the Watertown common council, and was elected mayor for two consecutive terms, in 1884 and 1885.

During these years, he also became active with the Wisconsin National Guard and was captain of the "Watertown Rifles" guard company. He was promoted to adjutant of the 2nd Wisconsin Infantry Regiment in 1888, then major for the 1st battalion of the regiment in 1892, and finally was promoted to lieutenant colonel of the regiment in 1895.

In the Fall of 1891, Wisconsin state senator Walter S. Greene died in office. As it became obvious that special sessions of the Legislature would be needed to deal with redistricting in 1892, a special election was called in the Spring of 1892 to fill his seat. Solliday was the Democratic nominee in the special election, and went on to win with 59% of the vote. Two years later, he won election to a full four-year term at the 1894 general election.

At the outbreak of the Spanish–American War, Solliday was still serving as lieutenant colonel of the 2nd Wisconsin Infantry Regiment and mustered into federal service with the regiment. They participated in the Puerto Rico campaign in 1898, and occupied the cities of Ponce and Coamo. Hostilities ended in August 1898, and the regiment returned to Wisconsin in September.

The regiment was mustered out in November 1898, and Solliday was then appointed quartermaster and commissary general for the state of Wisconsin, with the rank of brigadier general. He served just over two years in this role after the war.

Solliday died at his home in Watertown, Wisconsin.

== Electoral history ==
=== Wisconsin Senate (1892, 1894) ===
Wisconsin Senate, 23rd District Special Election, 1892
Party	Candidate	Votes	%	±%
Special Election, May 24, 1892
Democratic	Albert Solliday	5,078	59.33%	+1.39%
Republican	George J. Kispert	3,481	40.67%	+3.25%
Plurality		1,597	18.66%	-1.87%
Total votes		8,559	100.0%	+24.51%
Democratic hold				

Wisconsin Senate, 23rd District Election, 1894
Party	Candidate	Votes	%	±%
General Election, November 6, 1894
Democratic	Albert Solliday (incumbent)	5,611	50.22%	−9.11%
Republican	Edwin Huebert	5,236	46.86%	+6.19%
Prohibition	W. P. Stair	326	2.92%	
Plurality		375	3.36%	-15.30%
Total votes		11,173	100.0%	+30.54%
Democratic hold				

Wisconsin Senate
Preceded by Walter S. Greene	Member of the Wisconsin Senate from the 23rd district May 30, 1892 – January 2, 1899	Succeeded by John H. Harris
Political offices
Preceded by William H. Rohr	Mayor of Watertown, Wisconsin; April 1884 – April 1886	Succeeded by William F. Voss
