= William Voss =

19th century American politician

25th & 27th Mayor of Watertown, Wisconsin
- In office April 1892 – April 1895
- Preceded by: Frederick Kusel
- Succeeded by: Justus T. Moak
- In office April 1886 – April 1890
- Preceded by: Albert Solliday
- Succeeded by: Frederick Kusel

Member of the Wisconsin Senate from the 13th district
- In office January 5, 1891 – January 7, 1895
- Preceded by: Charles Pettibone
- Succeeded by: Michael E. Burke

Personal details
- Born: December 23, 1847 Berlin, Brandenburg, Kingdom of Prussia
- Died: November 2, 1921 (aged 73) Watertown, Wisconsin, U.S.
- Resting place: Oak Hill Cemetery, Watertown, Wisconsin
- Party: Democratic
- Spouse: Mary Schempf
- Children: Edna Voss; Albert E. Voss; Josie (Shealy); (Mrs. Max Baumann); Fred E. Voss

William Frederick Voss (December 23, 1847 – November 2, 1921) was a German American immigrant, banker, and politician. He was the 25th and 27th mayor of Watertown, Wisconsin, and represented Dodge County in the Wisconsin State Senate during the 1891 and 1893 sessions.

== Biography ==
William Voss was born on December 23, 1847, in Berlin, in what was then the Kingdom of Prussia. He emigrated to the United States with his parents in 1850. They first resided in Milwaukee for two years, then came to Watertown, Wisconsin, in 1852. He was educated at the public schools of Watertown, but by the time of his graduation in 1863, both his parents were dead.

As the eldest of four siblings, Voss took it upon himself to support the family. The day after his graduation, he walked to Columbus, Wisconsin, and secured temporary employment as a farmhand. He quickly transitioned to work as a clerk at the grocery store William Volkmann & Co., and worked there for three years. He then went to Cincinnati, Ohio, and worked for two years for John Schillito & Company.

He returned to Watertown in the employment of Justus T. Moak, and when Moak was appointed postmaster at Watertown in 1867, he designated Voss as his deputy. He worked with Moak for several years, and then determined to prospect for gold in Colorado. He ultimately abandoned that goal, but worked on a farm for about two years near Denver before returning to Wisconsin.

In the Spring of 1874, he was hired as bank teller for the Wisconsin National Bank. He remained with the bank for most of the rest of his career, and later became president of the bank. He was elected to the Watertown city council in 1879, 1880, 1881, and 1882, and was then elected mayor in 1886, 1887, 1888, and 1889.

In 1890, he was elected to the Wisconsin State Senate, running on the Democratic Party ticket. He represented Wisconsin's 13th State Senate district, which then comprised all of Dodge County. In the Senate, he was chairman of the committee on banking and currency, and was also a member of the committee on railroads. While serving as senator, he was elected to three more terms as mayor, in 1892, 1893, and 1894.

Voss was a member of the school board in Watertown on and off throughout his life, and served two long stretches as president of the school board. He was also president of the library board and secretary of the waterworks board.

Voss worked as president of the Wisconsin National Bank until his death. He died in his sleep on the morning of November 2, 1921, at his home in Watertown.

== Personal life and family ==
William F. Voss was the eldest surviving child of Frederick Voss. His mother died in 1856 and his father in 1861.

William Voss married Mary Schempf, daughter of pioneer merchant George L. Schempf, on May 21, 1878, in Watertown. They would have five children, all of whom survived him.

== Electoral history ==
=== Wisconsin Senate (1890) ===
Wisconsin Senate, 13th District Election, 1890
Party	Candidate	Votes	%	±%
General Election, November 4, 1890
Democratic	William Voss	6,458	75.0%	+32.2%
Republican	Christian Reinhart	2,148	25.0%	
Plurality		4,310	50.1%	+39.7%
Total votes		8,606	100%	-0.9%
Democratic gain from Independent				

Wisconsin Senate
Preceded by Charles Pettibone	Member of the Wisconsin Senate from the 13th district January 5, 1891 – January 7, 1895	Succeeded by Michael E. Burke
Political offices
Preceded by Albert Solliday	Mayor of Watertown, Wisconsin; April 1886 – April 1890	Succeeded by Frederick Kusel
Preceded by Frederick Kusel	Mayor of Watertown, Wisconsin; April 1892 – April 1895	Succeeded by Justus T. Moak
