= Eden (town), Fond du Lac County, Wisconsin =

Eden, Wisconsin
- Town
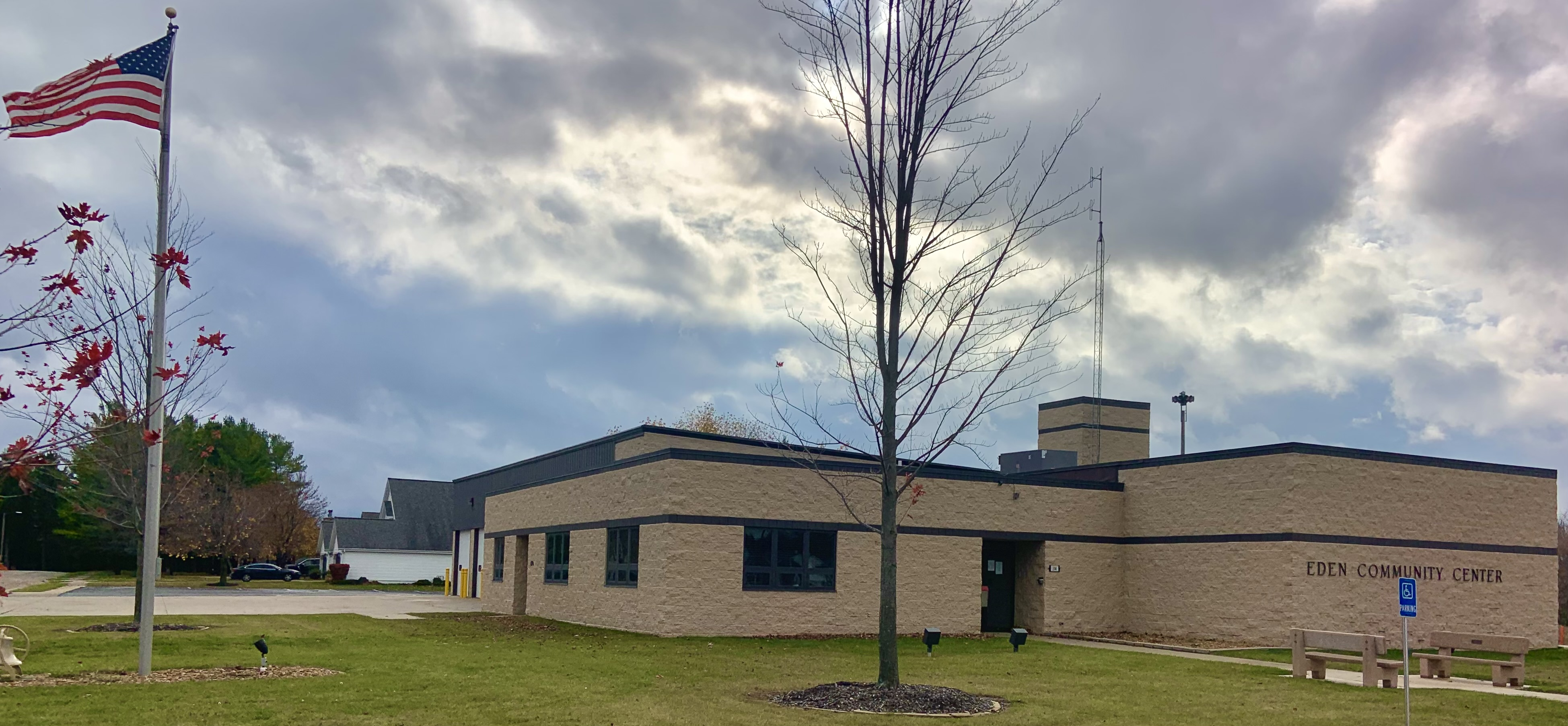
- Eden Community Center

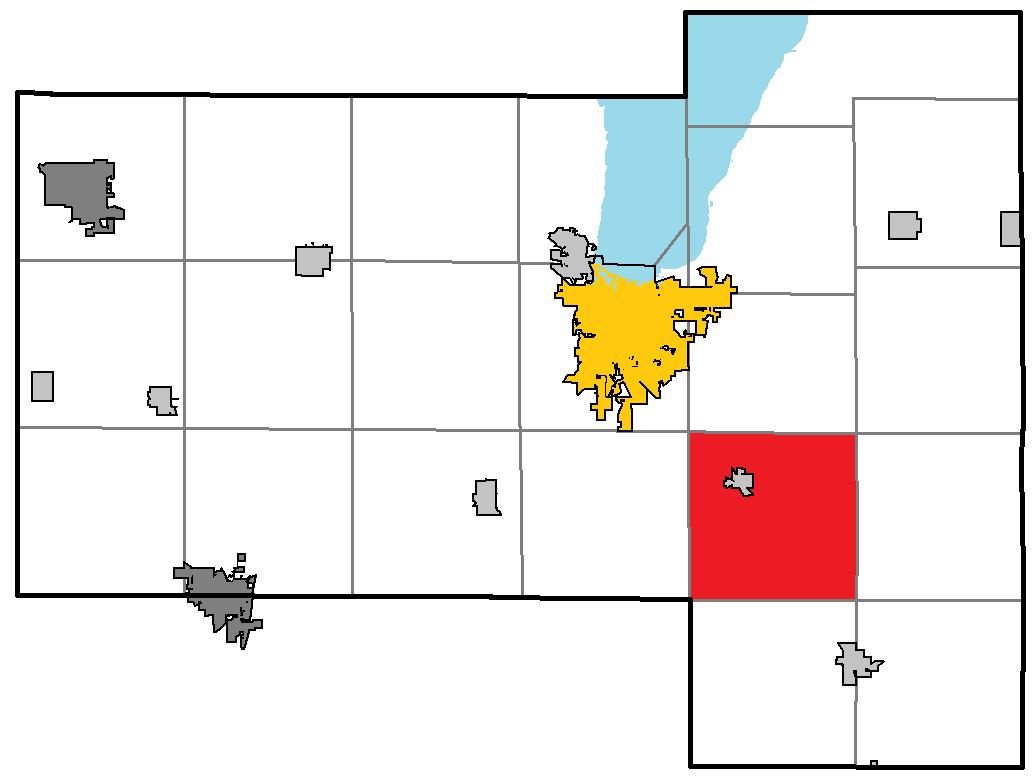
- Location of Eden, within Fond du Lac County

- Location within the state of Wisconsin
- Coordinates: 43°40′25″N 88°20′36″W
- Country: United States
- State: Wisconsin
- County: Fond du Lac

Area
  - Total: 36.1 sq mi (93.4 km^{2})
  - Land: 36.0 sq mi (93.2 km^{2})
  - Water: 0.039 sq mi (0.1 km^{2})
- Elevation: 1,043 ft (318 m)

Population (2020)
  - Total: 1,000
  - Density: 28/sq mi (11/km^{2})
- Time zone: UTC-6 (Central (CST))
  - Summer (DST): UTC-5 (CDT)
- Area code: 920
- FIPS code: 55-22500
- GNIS feature ID: 1583130
- Website: https://www.edentownship.com/

Eden is a town in Fond du Lac County, Wisconsin, United States. The population was 1,000 at the 2020 census. The Village of Eden is located within the town. The unincorporated community of Marblehead is also located in the town.

== Geography ==
According to the United States Census Bureau, the town has a total area of 36.0 square miles (93.4 km^{2}), of which 36.0 square miles (93.2 km^{2}) is land and 0.04 square mile (0.1 km^{2}) (0.11%) is water.

== Demographics ==
As of the census of 2000, there were 979 people, 337 households, and 276 families residing in the town. The population density was 27.2 people per square mile (10.5/km^{2}). There were 344 housing units at an average density of 9.6 per square mile (3.7/km^{2}). The racial makeup of the town was 98.57% White, 0.20% Black or African American, 0.10% Native American, 0.10% Asian, and 1.02% from two or more races. 1.12% of the population were Hispanic or Latino of any race.

There were 337 households, out of which 34.7% had children under the age of 18 living with them, 72.7% were married couples living together, 5.3% had a female householder with no husband present, and 18.1% were non-families. 15.1% of all households were made up of individuals, and 4.7% had someone living alone who was 65 years of age or older. The average household size was 2.91 and the average family size was 3.23.

In the town, the population was spread out, with 26.5% under the age of 18, 7.3% from 18 to 24, 30.5% from 25 to 44, 24.3% from 45 to 64, and 11.4% who were 65 years of age or older. The median age was 38 years. For every 100 females, there were 112.4 males. For every 100 females age 18 and over, there were 113.0 males.

The median income for a household in the town was $52,417, and the median income for a family was $54,625. Males had a median income of $35,885 versus $23,482 for females. The per capita income for the town was $20,131. About 2.1% of families and 2.1% of the population were below the poverty line, including none of those under age 18 and 4.4% of those age 65 or over.

== Notable people ==
- Thomas Cale, Alaska and Wisconsin politician
- Ignatius Klotz, Wisconsin politician and farmer
- Aaron Walters, member of the Wisconsin State Assembly
