= Bruce Peloquin =

American politician (1936–2024)

Member of the Wisconsin Senate from the 23rd district
- In office January 3, 1971 – January 3, 1979
- Preceded by: Holger Rasmusen
- Succeeded by: Marvin J. Roshell

Member of the Wisconsin State Assembly from the Chippewa County district
- In office January 4, 1965 – January 3, 1971
- Preceded by: Edgar E. Lien
- Succeeded by: Terry A. Willkom

Personal details
- Born: November 3, 1936 Chippewa Falls, Wisconsin, U.S.
- Died: October 2, 2024 (aged 87) Eau Claire, Wisconsin, U.S.
- Party: Democratic
- Spouse: Nancy Langlois (m. 1982)
- Children: 3
- Education: University of Wisconsin–Eau Claire

Bruce S. Peloquin (November 3, 1936 – October 2, 2024) was an American businessman and Democratic politician from Chippewa Falls, Wisconsin. He was a member of the Wisconsin Senate for eight years and served six years in the State Assembly.

== Biography ==
Peloquin was born on November 3, 1936, in Chippewa Falls, Wisconsin. He graduated from the University of Wisconsin-Eau Claire and became a member of the Knights of Columbus and the Society of the Holy Name. Peloquin was married with three children. Peloquin died on October 2, 2024 at the age of 87.

== Career ==
Peloquin was a member of the Senate from the 23rd District during the 1971, 1973, 1975 and 1977 sessions. He was elected to the Assembly in 1964, 1966 and 1968. Additionally, Peloquin was a member of the Chippewa County, Wisconsin Board from 1964 to 1966. He was a Democrat.

Wisconsin State Assembly
Preceded by Edgar E. Lien	Member of the Wisconsin State Assembly from the Chippewa County district January 4, 1965 – January 3, 1971	Succeeded by Terry A. Willkom
Wisconsin Senate
Preceded by Holger Rasmusen	Member of the Wisconsin Senate from the 23rd district January 3, 1971 – January 3, 1979	Succeeded by Marvin J. Roshell
