= Michael E. Burke =

American politician (1863–1918)

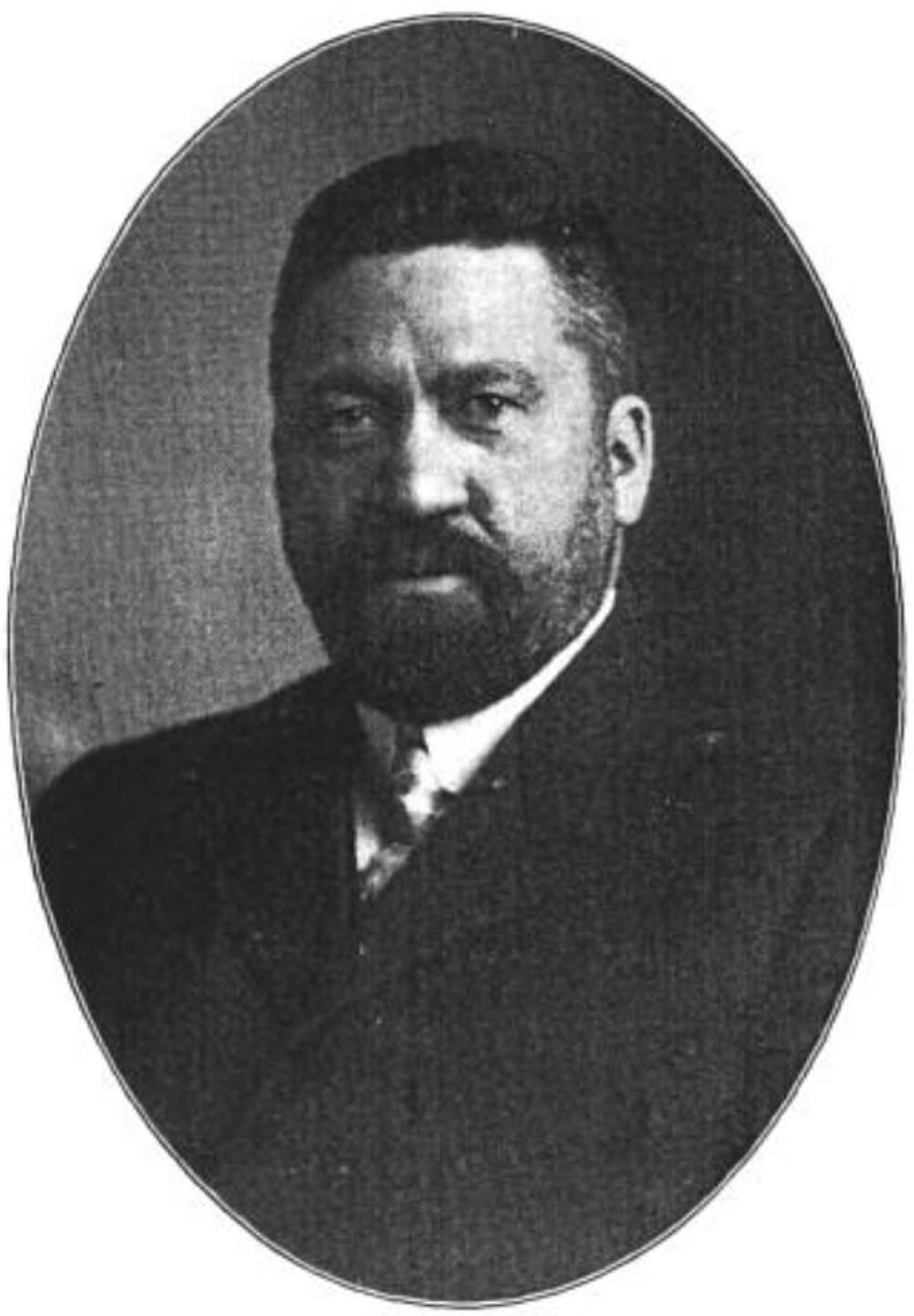

Member of the U.S. House of Representatives from Wisconsin
- In office March 4, 1911 – March 3, 1917
- Preceded by: Charles H. Weisse (6th); John M. Nelson (2nd)
- Succeeded by: Michael K. Reilly (6th); Edward Voigt (2nd)
- Constituency: 6th district (1911-13); 2nd district (1913-17)

Member of the Wisconsin Senate from the 13th district
- In office January 7, 1895 – January 2, 1899
- Preceded by: William Voss
- Succeeded by: Michael A. Jacobs

Member of the Wisconsin State Assembly
- In office January 2, 1893 – January 7, 1895
- Preceded by: Bennett E. Sampson
- Succeeded by: Henry Gilmore
- Constituency: Dodge 2nd district
- In office January 5, 1891 – January 2, 1893
- Preceded by: Thomas F. Solon
- Succeeded by: Bennett E. Sampson
- Constituency: Dodge 1st district

Personal details
- Born: October 15, 1863 Beaver Dam, Wisconsin, U.S.
- Died: December 12, 1918 (aged 55) Beaver Dam, Wisconsin, U.S.
- Resting place: Saint Patricks Cemetery, Beaver Dam
- Party: Democratic

Michael Edmund Burke (October 15, 1863 – December 12, 1918) was an American lawyer and Democratic politician from Beaver Dam, Wisconsin. He served three terms in the U.S. House of Representatives, representing east-central Wisconsin from 1911 to 1917. He previously served four years each in the Wisconsin Senate and Wisconsin State Assembly, representing Dodge County, and was mayor of Beaver Dam from 1908 to 1910.

== Biography ==
Born in Beaver Dam, Wisconsin, Burke attended local public schools and graduated from the Wayland Academy in Beaver Dam in 1884. He studied law at the University of Wisconsin–Madison in 1886 and 1887. He was admitted to the bar in 1888 and commenced practice in Beaver Dam. He served as town clerk from 1887 to 1889. He served as member of the Wisconsin State Assembly from 1891 to 1893. He served in the Wisconsin State Senate from 1895 to 1899. Burke married Emma Sontag (1875–1921) in 1898. Burke served as city attorney of Beaver Dam from 1893 to 1908. He served as delegate to the Democratic National Convention in 1904.

Burke was elected mayor of Beaver Dam and served from 1908 to 1910.

Burke was elected as a Democrat to the Sixty-second United States Congress representing Wisconsin's 6th congressional district from March 4, 1911 till March 3, 1913. He was reelected to the Sixty-third, and Sixty-fourth Congresses this time as a representative of Wisconsin's 2nd congressional district (March 4, 1913 – March 3, 1917). He was an unsuccessful candidate for reelection in 1916. He died at Beaver Dam, Wisconsin, December 12, 1918. He was interred in St. Patrick's Cemetery.

U.S. House of Representatives
Preceded by Charles H. Weisse	Member of the U.S. House of Representatives from Wisconsin's 6th congressional district March 4, 1911 – March 3,1913	Succeeded by Michael K. Reilly
Preceded by John M. Nelson	Member of the U.S. House of Representatives from Wisconsin's 2nd congressional district March 4, 1913 – March 3, 1917	Succeeded by Edward Voigt
