= Eagle (town), Wisconsin =

Eagle, Wisconsin
- Town
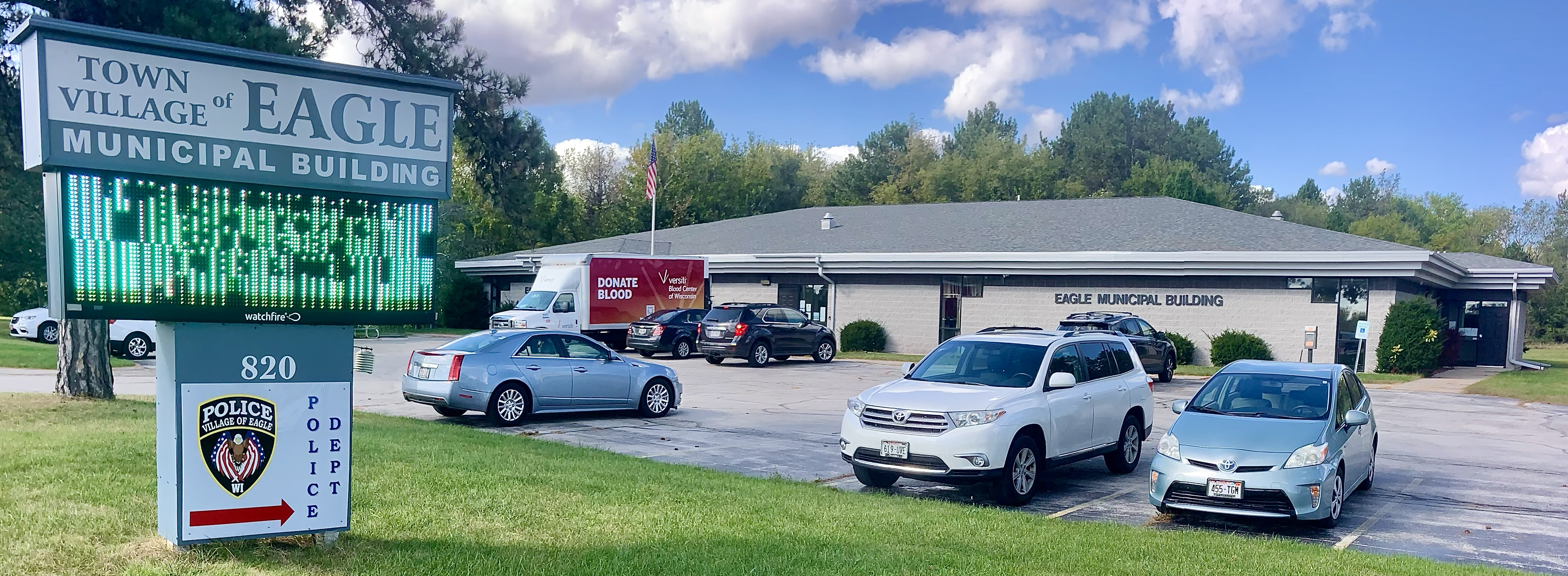
- Eagle Town & Village Hall

- Location in Waukesha County and the state of Wisconsin.
- Coordinates: 42°52′44.04″N 88°28′17.4″W
- Country: United States
- State: Wisconsin
- County: Waukesha

Government
  - Town Chairman: Robert Kwiatkowski

Area
  - Total: 35.1 sq mi (90.8 km^{2})
  - Land: 34.6 sq mi (89.7 km^{2})
  - Water: 0.42 sq mi (1.1 km^{2})
- Elevation: 902 ft (275 m)

Population (2020)
  - Total: 3,478
  - Density: 90/sq mi (34.8/km^{2})
- Time zone: UTC-6 (CST)
  - Summer (DST): UTC-5 (CDT)
- ZIP code: 53119
- Area code: 262
- FIPS code: 55-13321
- GNIS feature ID: 1583112
- Website: Town of Eagle

Eagle is a town in Waukesha County, Wisconsin, United States. The population was 3,478 at the 2020 census. The Village of Eagle is located within the town. The unincorporated community of Eagleville is also located in the town.

== History ==
The town's name comes from an 1836 incident when pioneer Thomas Sugden and two companions, exploring the area, spotted what was described as "a monster bald-headed eagle... hovering and curving over a large mound" in the midst of the prairie.

On June 21, 2010, a tornado wreaking major damage passed through the town, and the storm that prompted the tornado then prompted warnings for Racine and Milwaukee counties.

== Geography ==
According to the United States Census Bureau, the town has a total area of 35.1 square miles (90.8 km^{2}), of which 34.6 square miles (89.7 km^{2}) is land and 0.4 square mile (1.1 km^{2}) (1.23%) is water.

== Demographics ==
Historical population
Census	Pop.	Note	%±
1980	1,758		—
1990	2,028		15.4%
2000	3,117		53.7%
2010	3,507		12.5%
2020	3,478		−0.8%

As of the census of 2000, there were 3,117 people, 1,049 households, and 904 families residing in the town. The population density was 90.0 people per square mile (34.8/km^{2}). There were 1,118 housing units at an average density of 32.3 per square mile (12.5/km^{2}). The racial makeup of the town was 97.85% White, 0.51% Black or African American, 0.16% Native American, 0.38% Asian, 0.38% from other races, and 0.71% from two or more races. 0.58% of the population were Hispanic or Latino of any race.

There were 1,049 households, out of which 43.4% had children under the age of 18 living with them, 79.8% were married couples living together, 3.3% had a female householder with no husband present, and 13.8% were non-families. 9.9% of all households were made up of individuals, and 3.2% had someone living alone who was 65 years of age or older. The average household size was 2.97 and the average family size was 3.18.

In the town, the population was spread out, with 29.0% under the age of 18, 5.8% from 18 to 24, 33.0% from 25 to 44, 25.6% from 45 to 64, and 6.5% who were 65 years of age or older. The median age was 37 years. For every 100 females, there were 96.9 males. For every 100 females age 18 and over, there were 101.4 males.

The median income for a household in the town was $69,071, and the median income for a family was $73,611. Males had a median income of $51,607 versus $32,500 for females. The per capita income for the town was $26,354. About 2.8% of families and 3.1% of the population were below the poverty line, including 3.1% of those under age 18 and 5.9% of those age 65 or over.

== Culture ==
Old World Wisconsin, an open-air museum re-creating the working farmsteads and settlements of European immigrants, is in Eagle. The museum demonstrates teams of oxen and horses working in the fields, farm folk preparing meals over wood-burning stoves, and heirloom plants in gardens.

== Notable people ==
- Chellsie Memmel, gymnast and 2008 Olympic silver medalist
- Matthias J. Regan, Wisconsin State Representative
- Charles A. Snover, Wisconsin State Senator
