= Aaron Walters =

American politician

Aaron Walters (August 7, 1809 – December 27, 1889) was a member of the Wisconsin State Assembly.

== Biography ==
Walters was born on August 7, 1809, in Plattsburgh, New York. He married three times. First, to Orpha B. Griswold in 1831. They had three children before her death in 1839. Second, Walters married Rosanna Averill in 1840. They had two children before her death in 1858. In 1859, Walters married Mary Norman, a widowed mother of three. Through her mother, Mary was related to Enos T. Throop, a member of the United States House of Representatives and the 10th Governor of New York. He died of pneumonia on December 27, 1889.

== Career ==
Walters was a member of the Assembly in 1857 and 1872. He was an unsuccessful candidate for the Assembly in 1859. Other positions Walters held include Chairman (similar to Mayor) of Eden, Fond du Lac County, Wisconsin and County Supervisor of Fond du Lac County, Wisconsin. He was a Democrat.
