= Charles A. Snover =

American politician

Charles A. Snover (August 2, 1855 – April 24, 1916) was an American farmer, businessman, and politician.

== Biography ==
Born in the town of Eagle, Waukesha County, Wisconsin, Snover went to Fort Atkinson High School in Fort Atkinson, Wisconsin. He worked on the railroad, was a postal clerk, and owned a hotel. He owned a dairy farm in Fort Atkinson. Snover served as sheriff of Jefferson County, Wisconsin in 1900. He also served as city clerk, mayor, on the Fort Atkinson Common Council, and on Jefferson County Supervisors. Snover was a Democrat. Snover served in the Wisconsin State Senate from 1911 to 1916. He died at his home in Fort Atkinson, Wisconsin from a long illness.
