= S. W. Budlong =

American politician

S. W. Budlong was an American politician. He was a member of the Wisconsin State Senate. Budlong represented the 23rd District during the 1865 and 1866 sessions. He was a Democrat.
