= Yates Polytechnic Institute =

Manual labor college in Chittenango, New York, US

The Yates Polytechnic Institute was founded in 1824 by John B. Yates in the village of Chittenango, New York, United States. The large building in which the institution was located was constructed in 1814 as a tavern before it was purchased by Yates. The institution considered itself to be one of the earliest manual labor schools in the nation. The school was organized as follows: Rev. Andrew Yates, principal; Rev. David A. Sherman, professor of philology and ancient languages; Benjamin F. Joslin, professor of natural science; Jonathan Ely, professor of practical agriculture and natural science; Stephen Alexander, professor of natural philosophy and mathematics.

Yates, who bore the titles of judge, lawyer, state assemblyman, congressman, and who was also the owner and investor of many local enterprises including flour mills, a lime and plaster mill, a woolen factory, stores, and dry dock and boat yards, founded the Yates Polytechnic Institute after a long time of entertaining the idea of starting a school of practical instruction. His brother, Andrew Yates, who at the time was a professor at Union College, left his position and became president of the Yates Polytechnic Institute.
