= William M. Morse =

American politician

William M. Morse (December 18, 1826 – June 22, 1875) was an American surveyor and politician.

Morse was born in Alderley, Gloucestershire, England. In 1846, Morse emigrated to the United States and settled in Dodge County, Wisconsin Territory. Eventually he settled in Rubicon, Wisconsin and was a surveyor. Morse was a Democrat. He served as chairman of the Rubicon Town Board. He also served as clerk and superintendent of public schools of his town. From 1851 to 1859, Morse served as the Dodge County Surveyor. He was served on the Dodge County Board of Supervisors and was chairman of the county board. Morse served in the Wisconsin Assembly in 1857, 1866, and 1875. Morse died suddenly in Rubicon, Wisconsin while still in the Wisconsin Assembly.
