= 46th Wisconsin Legislature =

Wisconsin legislative term for 1903–1904

←	45th	47th	→
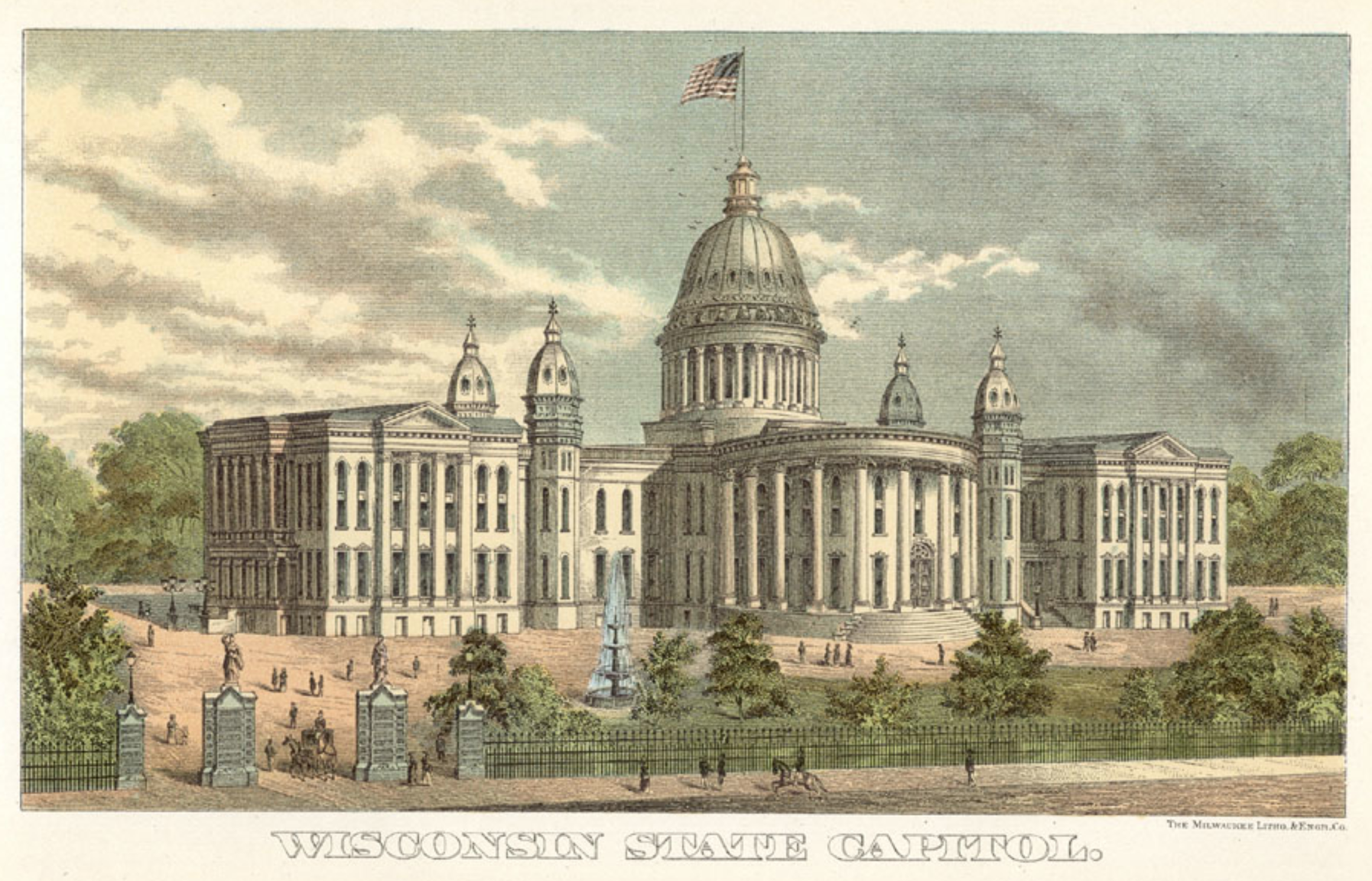
- Wisconsin State Capitol, 1887

Overview
- Legislative body: Wisconsin Legislature
- Meeting place: Wisconsin State Capitol
- Term: January 5, 1903 – January 2, 1905
- Election: November 4, 1902

Senate
- Members: 33
- Senate President: James O. Davidson (R)
- President pro tempore: James J. McGillivray (R)
- Party control: Republican

Assembly
- Members: 100
- Assembly Speaker: Irvine Lenroot (R)
- Party control: Republican

Sessions
- 1st: January 14, 1903 – May 23, 1903

The Forty-Sixth Wisconsin Legislature convened from January 14, 1903, to May 23, 1903, in regular session. During this legislative term but after the end of the legislative session, in February 1904, the Wisconsin State Capitol suffered a severe fire that destroyed two wings and damaged the rotunda.

This was the first legislative session after the redistricting of the Senate and Assembly according to acts of the previous session.

Senators representing odd-numbered districts were newly elected for this session and were serving the first two years of a four-year term. Assembly members were elected to a two-year term. Assembly members and odd-numbered senators were elected in the general election of November 4, 1902. Senators representing even-numbered districts were serving the third and fourth year of a four-year term, having been elected in the general election of November 6, 1900.

The governor of Wisconsin during this entire term was Republican Robert M. La Follette, of Dane County, serving his second two-year term, having won re-election in the 1902 Wisconsin gubernatorial election.

== Major events ==
- Unknown date: Harley-Davidson motorcycle company was founded in Milwaukee, Wisconsin.
- January 28, 1903: John Coit Spooner was re-elected United States Senator by the Wisconsin Legislature in joint session.
- February 23, 1903: Cuba leased Guantánamo Bay to the United States in perpetuity.
- March 20, 1903: Wisconsin Supreme Court justice Charles V. Bardeen died of cancer in Madison, Wisconsin.
- April 7, 1903: Wisconsin spring general election:
  - Robert G. Siebecker was elected to the Wisconsin Supreme Court.
  - Voters approved an amendment to the Wisconsin constitution to add two seats to the Wisconsin Supreme Court.
- April 9, 1903: Judge Robert G. Siebecker was appointed to begin his term early on the Wisconsin Supreme Court by Governor Robert M. La Follette.
- June 16, 1903: The Ford Motor Company was founded in Detroit, Michigan.
- July 20, 1903: Pope Leo XIII died at the Apostolic Palace in Rome.
- August 9, 1903: Coronation of Cardinal Giuseppe Melchiorre Sarto as Pope Pius X.
- September 11, 1903: The first stock-car race was held at the Milwaukee Mile in Milwaukee County, Wisconsin.
- October 1, 1903: The first game of the modern World Series of baseball was held in Boston, Massachusetts.
- November 3, 1903: With the support of the United States, Panama declared its independence from Colombia.
- November 18, 1903: The Hay–Bunau-Varilla Treaty was signed by the United States and Panama, giving the United States exclusive rights to the Panama Canal Zone.
- December 17, 1903: The Wright brothers Wright Flyer made the first powered, controlled flight of a heavier-than-air aircraft at Kitty Hawk, North Carolina.
- December 30, 1903: The Iroquois Theatre fire in Chicago, Illinois, killed 602.
- January 1, 1904: Frederick Pabst, founder of the Pabst Brewing Company, died in Milwaukee, Wisconsin.
- February 8, 1904: The Empire of Japan launched a surprise attack on Russian Dalian, igniting the Russo-Japanese War.
- February 26, 1904: A gas jet ignited the newly varnished ceiling of the Wisconsin State Capitol, starting a fire that would burn down most of the building.
- April 8, 1904: The Entente Cordiale was signed by the United Kingdom and France.
- May 4, 1904: United States Army engineers began work on the Panama Canal.
- May 21, 1904: The International Federation of Association Football, FIFA, was founded.
- July 1, 1904: Start of the 1904 Summer Olympics in St. Louis, Missouri. These were the third modern Olympics and the first held in the United States.
- July 30, 1904: Wisconsin Governor Robert La Follette removed the state treasurer, John J. Kempf, from office for his failure to give the required bond for the office.
- November 8, 1904: 1904 United States general election:
  - Theodore Roosevelt re-elected as President of the United States.
  - Robert M. La Follette re-elected to a third term as Governor of Wisconsin.
  - Wisconsin voters approved a referendum to utilize primary elections for party nominations for state offices.
- December 6, 1904: President Theodore Roosevelt declared his Corollary to the Monroe Doctrine, stating that the United States will intervene in the Western Hemisphere where Latin American governments prove incapable or unstable.
- December 31, 1904: The first New Year's Eve celebration was held at Times Square, New York City.

== Major legislation ==
- March 24, 1903: An Act to provide for making nominations and for filing nomination papers for the office of Associate Justice of the Supreme Court for the term commencing on the first Monday of January 1904, and for placing the names of the nominees for such office on the official ballot, 1903 Act 27. Set up a special period for new nominations for the Wisconsin Supreme Court election set to be held in April 1903, due to the death of the incumbent justice Charles V. Bardeen, who had been set to run for re-election.
- March 27, 1903: An Act relating to the duties, qualifications and salary of the state superintendent, 1903 Act 37. Using a new amendment to the state constitution to define the office of the state superintendent of public instruction.
- April 3, 1903: An Act to provide for state insurance on public buildings, and making an appropriation therefor, 1903 Act 68. Terminated existing state fire insurance—10 months before the Capitol suffered a severe fire.
- May 13, 1903: An Act for the creation of banks and for the regulation and supervision of the banking business, 1903 Act 234. Utilized the new amendment to the state constitution to regulate banking and establish the Wisconsin Department of Banking.
- May 20, 1903: An Act to provide for the protection of employees and sanitation in certain buildings, 1903 Act 323.
- May 23, 1903: An Act to provide for party nominations by direct vote, 1903 Act 451. Set methodology for party nominations to be determined via primary elections rather than nominating conventions, and proposed a referendum to have the plan ratified by voters.
- Joint Resolution agreeing to the proposed amendment to the constitution, 1903 Joint Resolution 7. This was the second required legislative passage of the constitutional amendment to expand the Wisconsin Supreme Court to 7 seats. The amendment was then ratified by voters in the 1903 Spring election.
- Joint Resolution, 1903 Joint Resolution 9. Calling for a federal constitutional convention to draft an amendment to the United States Constitution for the popular election of United States senators.
- Joint Resolution providing for an amendment to section 1, article VIII, of the Constitution, relating to taxation, 1903 Joint Resolution 11. Proposed an amendment to the Wisconsin constitution to allow a graduated income tax.

== Summary ==
=== Senate summary ===
Senate partisan composition Democratic: 3 seats Republican: 30 seats

	Party (Shading indicates majority caucus)			Total	
	Dem.	S.D.	Rep.	Total	Vacant
End of previous Legislature	2	0	29	31	2
Start of 1st Session	3	0	30	33	0
From Aug. 24, 1903 (Note: Republican Christian Sarau (District 19) died August 24, 1903.)	3	0	29	32	1
Final voting share	9.38%		90.63%		
Beginning of the next Legislature	4	1	28	33	0

=== Assembly summary ===
Assembly partisan composition Democratic: 25 seats Republican: 75 seats

	Party (Shading indicates majority caucus)			Total	
	Dem.	S.D.	Rep.	Total	Vacant
End of previous Legislature	19	0	81	100	0
Start of 1st Session	25	0	74	99	1
From Feb. 18, 1903	25	0	75	100	0
From Aug. 26, 1903 (Note: Republican David G. Williams (Columbia 2nd District) died August 26, 1903.)	25	0	74	99	1
From Oct. 29, 1903 (Note: Democrat Thomas F. Timlin (Milwaukee 6th District) died October 29, 1903.)	24	0	74	98	2
From Mar. 30, 1904 (Note: Republican Frank A. Cady (Wood District) died March 30, 1904.)	24	0	73	97	3
Final voting share	24.74%		75.26%		
Beginning of the next Legislature	11	4	85	100	0

== Sessions ==
- 1st Regular session: January 14, 1903 – May 23, 1903

== Leaders ==
=== Senate leadership ===
- President of the Senate: James O. Davidson (R)
- President pro tempore: James J. McGillivray (R–Black River Falls)

=== Assembly leadership ===
- Speaker of the Assembly: Irvine Lenroot (R–Superior)

== Members ==
=== Members of the Senate ===
Members of the Senate for the Forty-Sixth Wisconsin Legislature:

Senate partisan representation Democratic: 3 seats Republican: 30 seats

Dist.	Counties	Senator	Residence	Party
01	Door, Kewaunee, & Marinette	Harlan P. Bird	Wausaukee	Rep.
02	Brown & Oconto	Henry F. Hagemeister	Green Bay	Rep.
03	Kenosha & Racine	Otis W. Johnson	Racine	Rep.
04	Milwaukee (Northern Part)	J. Herbert Green	Milwaukee	Rep.
05	Milwaukee (City Center)	Charles C. Rogers	Milwaukee	Rep.
06	Milwaukee (City Northwest)	Rip Reukema	Milwaukee	Rep.
07	Milwaukee (Southern & Western County)	Barney Eaton	Milwaukee	Rep.
08	Milwaukee (City South)	Julius E. Roehr	Milwaukee	Rep.
09	Adams, Marquette, Waushara, & Wood	Herman C. Wipperman	Grand Rapids	Rep.
10	Pierce & St. Croix	Orville W. Mosher	New Richmond	Rep.
11	Burnett, Douglas, & Polk	George Hudnall	Superior	Rep.
12	Ashland, Bayfield, Price, Sawyer, Taylor, & Washburn	William O'Neil	Washburn	Rep.
13	Dodge	William C. North	Fox Lake	Dem.
14	Outagamie & Shawano	T. A. Willy	Appleton	Rep.
15	Calumet & Manitowoc	Samuel W. Randolph	Manitowoc	Dem.
16	Crawford & Grant	Edward E. Burns	Platteville	Rep.
17	Green, Iowa, & Lafayette	Harry C. Martin	Darlington	Rep.
18	Fond du Lac & Green Lake	Elmer D. Morse	Princeton	Rep.
19	Winnebago	Christian Sarau (died Aug. 23, 1903)	Oshkosh	Rep.
19	Winnebago	--Vacant from Aug. 23, 1903--		
20	Ozaukee & Sheboygan	George W. Wolff	Rhine	Rep.
21	Portage & Waupaca	William H. Hatton	New London	Rep.
22	Rock	John M. Whitehead	Janesville	Rep.
23	Jefferson & Walworth	Zadoc P. Beach	Whitewater	Rep.
24	Chippewa, Eau Claire, & Gates	Frank McDonough	Eau Claire	Rep.
25	Clark & Marathon	Andrew L. Kreutzer	Wausau	Rep.
26	Dane	George P. Miller	Madison	Rep.
27	Columbia & Sauk	George Wylie	Leeds	Rep.
28	Richland, & Vernon	Oliver Munson	Viroqua	Rep.
29	Barron, Buffalo, Dunn, & Pepin	James H. Stout	Menomonie	Rep.
30	Florence, Forest, Iron, Langlade, Lincoln, Oneida, & Vilas	Daniel E. Riordan	Eagle River	Rep.
31	Jackson, Juneau, & Monroe	James J. McGillivray	Black River Falls	Rep.
32	La Crosse & Trempealeau	John C. Gaveney	Arcadia	Rep.
33	Washington & Waukesha	Ernst Merton	Waukesha	Dem.

=== Members of the Assembly ===
Members of the Assembly for the Forty-Sixth Wisconsin Legislature:

Assembly partisan composition Democratic: 25 seats Republican: 75 seats

Milwaukee County districts

Senate District	County	Dist.	Representative	Party	Residence
09	Adams & Marquette		Frank J. Kimball	Rep.	Douglas
12	Ashland		Ernest A. Strong	Rep.	Ashland
29	Barron		Henry C. Doolittle	Rep.	Cumberland
12	Bayfield, Sawyer, & Washburn		Charles F. Morris	Rep.	Iron River
02	Brown	1	William Finnegan	Rep.	
02	Brown	2	Joseph F. Martin	Dem.	De Pere
29	Buffalo & Pepin		Charles W. Gilman	Rep.	Mondovi
11	Burnett & Polk		Simon Thoreson	Rep.	Grantsburg
15	Calumet		Lewis Rupp	Dem.	
24	Chippewa & Gates	1	Patrick J. Cosgrove	Rep.	
24	Chippewa & Gates	2	W. B. Bartlett	Rep.	Eagle Point
25	Clark		William S. Irvine	Rep.	Beaver
27	Columbia	1	Scott F. Verbeck	Rep.	
27	Columbia	2	David G. Williams	Rep.	Cambria
16	Crawford		James Dinsdale	Rep.	Soldiers Grove
26	Dane	1	Matthew S. Dudgeon	Rep.	Madison
26	Dane	2	Torger G. Thompson	Rep.	Deerfield
26	Dane	3	John S. Donald	Rep.	Mount Horeb
13	Dodge	1	Henry R. Moldenhauer	Dem.	Lebanon
13	Dodge	2	Daniel L. Hannifin	Dem.	Portland
01	Door		Charles Reynolds	Rep.	Jacksonport
11	Douglas	1	Irvine Lenroot	Rep.	Superior
11	Douglas	2	Wallace W. Andrew	Rep.	Superior
29	Dunn		Ole G. Kinney	Rep.	Colfax
24	Eau Claire	1	Robert A. Lang	Rep.	Eau Claire
24	Eau Claire	2	Ira B. Bradford	Rep.	Augusta
30	Florence, Forest, & Langlade		Roswell J. Morgan	Rep.	
18	Fond du Lac	1	Joseph Carberry	Dem.	Friendship
18	Fond du Lac	2	John Loebs	Rep.	Campbellsport
16	Grant	1	Sherman E. Smalley	Rep.	Cuba City
16	Grant	2	Joseph P. Chandler	Rep.	Montford
17	Green		Andrew S. Douglas	Rep.	Brodhead
18	Green Lake		Charles H. Smith	Rep.	Markesan
17	Iowa		Roy C. Smelker	Rep.	Dodgeville
30	Iron, Oneida, & Vilas		Albert L. Osborn	Rep.	Hurley
31	Jackson		Winfield S. Braddock	Rep.	
23	Jefferson	1	George J. Kern	Dem.	Sullivan
23	Jefferson	2	Lewis Benson	Dem.	Oakland
31	Juneau		Frank M. Reed	Rep.	Necedah
03	Kenosha		S. Dwight Slade	Rep.	Wheatland
01	Kewaunee		L. Albert Karel	Dem.	Kewaunee
32	La Crosse	1	George H. Ray	Rep.	La Crosse
32	La Crosse	2	Thomas Johnson	Rep.	Holland
17	Lafayette		Richard E. Tarrell	Rep.	Elk Grove
30	Lincoln		Edward W. Whitson	Rep.	Tomahawk
15	Manitowoc	1	Joseph Willott Jr.	Rep.	Manitowoc
15	Manitowoc	2	Nicholas H. Terens	Dem.	Mishicot
25	Marathon	1	Willis F. La Du	Dem.	Mosinee
25	Marathon	2	Herman Miller	Rep.	Wausau
01	Marinette	1	Edward W. LeRoy	Rep.	Marinette
01	Marinette	2	Frederick M. Price	Rep.	Peshtigo
04	Milwaukee	1	Joseph M. Crowley	Dem.	Milwaukee
05	Milwaukee	2	Cornelius Sidler	Rep.	Milwaukee
07	Milwaukee	3	Herman W. Waterman	Rep.	Milwaukee
05	Milwaukee	4	Fred C. Westfahl	Rep.	Milwaukee
08	Milwaukee	5	Frank T. Hassa	Dem.	Milwaukee
05	Milwaukee	6	Thomas F. Timlin	Dem.	Milwaukee
07	Milwaukee	7	Frederick Hartung	Rep.	Wauwatosa
08	Milwaukee	8	Reinhold Thiessenhusen	Rep.	Milwaukee
06	Milwaukee	9	Jacob Kehrein	Dem.	Milwaukee
06	Milwaukee	10	George Rankl	Rep.	Milwaukee
08	Milwaukee	11	Frank Haderer	Dem.	Milwaukee
06	Milwaukee	12	Charles Barker	Rep.	Milwaukee
04	Milwaukee	13	Rudolph W. E. Fritzke	Dem.	Milwaukee
07	Milwaukee	14	John Szymarek	Dem.	Milwaukee
04	Milwaukee	15	Philip Hamm	Rep.	Milwaukee
06	Milwaukee	16	Fred B. Breitwisch	Rep.	Milwaukee
31	Monroe		George P. Stevens	Rep.	Tomah
02	Oconto		Henry Johnson	Rep.	Suring
14	Outagamie	1	Warren L. Root	Rep.	Appleton
14	Outagamie	2	David Hodgins	Rep.	Hortonville
20	Ozaukee		Nicholas E. Becker	Dem.	
10	Pierce		Freeman Lord	Rep.	River Falls
21	Portage		Fred J. Carpenter	Rep.	Stevens Point
12	Price, & Taylor		Nathan E. Lane	Rep.	Phillips
03	Racine	1	John Dixon	Rep.	Racine
03	Racine	2	--Vacant until Feb. 18, 1903--		
03	Racine	2	Edward F. Rakow	Dem.	Burlington
28	Richland		J. E. Coffland	Dem.	Richland Center
22	Rock	1	Alexander White	Rep.	Porter
22	Rock	2	Charles L. Valentine	Rep.	Janesville
22	Rock	3	James A. Brittan	Rep.	Beloit
27	Sauk	1	Franklin Johnson	Rep.	Baraboo
27	Sauk	2	Evan W. Evans	Dem.	Spring Green
14	Shawano		Michael J. Wallrich	Rep.	Shawano
20	Sheboygan	1	Peter Bartzen	Dem.	Sheboygan
20	Sheboygan	2	George W. Koch	Rep.	Scott
10	St. Croix		James A. Frear	Rep.	Hudson
32	Trempealeau		Herman Ekern	Rep.	Whitehall
28	Vernon		Andrew H. Dahl	Rep.	Westby
23	Walworth		Albert E. Smith	Rep.	Delavan
33	Washington		B. S. Potter	Dem.	West Bend
33	Waukesha	1	James Johnston	Rep.	Mukwonago
33	Waukesha	2	Roderick Ainsworth	Rep.	Merton
21	Waupaca	1	Barney S. Peterson	Rep.	Scandinavia
21	Waupaca	2	George E. Beedle	Rep.	
09	Waushara		David Evans Jr.	Rep.	Aurora
19	Winnebago	1	William C. Cowling	Rep.	Oshkosh
19	Winnebago	2	William Arnemann	Dem.	Neenah
19	Winnebago	3	John A. Fridd	Rep.	
09	Wood		Frank A. Cady	Rep.	Marshfield

== Committees ==
=== Senate committees ===
- Senate Committee on Agriculture – G. Wylie, chair
- Senate Committee on Assessment and Collection of Taxes – J. M. Whitehead, chair
- Senate Committee on Banks and Insurance – J. E. Roehr, chair
- Senate Committee on Bills on Third Reading – R. Reukema, chair
- Senate Committee on Corporations – J. H. Green, chair
- Senate Committee on Education – J. H. Stout, chair
- Senate Committee on Enrolled Bills – C. Sarau, chair
- Senate Committee on Engrossed Bills – G. B. Hudnall, chair
- Senate Committee on Federal Relations – H. C. Martin, chair
- Senate Committee on the Judiciary – A. L. Kreutzer, chair
- Senate Committee on Legislative Expenses – O. W. Johnson, chair
- Senate Committee on Manufactures and Labor – G. P. Miller, chair
- Senate Committee on Military Affairs – E. E. Burns, chair
- Senate Committee on Privileges and Elections – E. D. Morse, chair
- Senate Committee on Public Health – B. A. Eaton, chair
- Senate Committee on Public Lands – C. C. Rogers, chair
- Senate Committee on Railroads – T. A. Willy, chair
- Senate Committee on Roads and Bridges – G. W. Wolff, chair
- Senate Committee on State Affairs – W. H. Hatten, chair
- Senate Committee on Town and County Organizations – W. O'Neil, chair

=== Assembly committees ===
- Assembly Committee on Agriculture – R. Ainsworth, chair
- Assembly Committee on Assessment and Collection of Taxes – S. E. Smalley, chair
- Assembly Committee on Bills on Third Reading – F. H. Lord, chair
- Assembly Committee on Cities – G. H. Ray, chair
- Assembly Committee on Corporations – I. B. Bradford, chair
- Assembly Committee on Dairy and Food – S. D. Slade, chair
- Assembly Committee on Education – J. Johnston, chair
- Assembly Committee on Enrolled Bills – G. E. Beedle, chair
- Assembly Committee on Engrossed Bills – O. G. Kinney, chair
- Assembly Committee on Federal Relations – F. Hartung, chair
- Assembly Committee on Finance, Banks and Insurance – N. E. Lane, chair
- Assembly Committee on the Judiciary – F. A. Cady, chair
- Assembly Committee on Legislative Expenditures – T. Johnson, chair
- Assembly Committee on Lumber and Mining – H. Johnson, chair
- Assembly Committee on Manufactures – G. Rankl, chair
- Assembly Committee on Military Affairs – A. E. Smith, chair
- Assembly Committee on Privileges and Elections – W. W. Andrew, chair
- Assembly Committee on Public Health and Sanitation – E. W. Whitson, chair
- Assembly Committee on Public Improvements – W. B. Bartlett, chair
- Assembly Committee on Public Lands – G. P. Stevens, chair
- Assembly Committee on Railroads – C. W. Gilman, chair
- Assembly Committee on Roads and Bridges – B. S. Peterson, chair
- Assembly Committee on State Affairs – W. L. Root, chair
- Assembly Committee on Town and County Organization – D. Hodgins, chair
- Assembly Committee on Ways and Means – J. Willott, chair

=== Joint committees ===
- Joint Committee on Charitable and Penal Institutions – Mosher(Sen.) & A. H. Dahl (Asm.), co-chairs
- Joint Committee on Claims – Hagemeister (Sen.) & D. Evans (Asm.), co-chairs
- Joint Committee on Fish and Game – Wipperman (Sen.) & C. L. Valentine (Asm.), co-chairs
- Joint Committee on Forestry and Lumber – McDonough (Sen.) & S. Thoreson (Asm.), co-chairs
- Joint Committee on Printing – Munson (Sen.) & W. C. Cowling (Asm.), co-chairs
- Special Joint Committee on Coal Supply – McGillivray (Sen.) & A. H. Dahl (Asm.), co-chairs
- Special Joint Committee on Rules – Gaveney (Sen.) & F. A. Cady (Asm.), co-chairs

== Employees ==
=== Senate employees ===
- Chief Clerk: Theodore W. Goldin
  - Journal Clerk: F. E. Andrews
  - Bookkeeper: J. D. O'Brien
  - General Clerk: Frank M. Welch
  - Engrossing Clerk: H. Wipperman Jr.
  - Enrolling Clerk: W. V. Dorwin
- Sergeant-at-Arms: Sanfield MacDonald
  - Assistant Sergeant-at-Arms: Joseph Elliott
  - Document Clerk: B. H. Straw
- Postmaster: Christoph Paulus

=== Assembly employees ===
- Chief Clerk: C. O. Marsh
  - Journal Clerk: W. W. Powell
  - Bookkeeper: Chas. A. Leicht
  - General Clerk: C. E. Shaffer
    - 2nd General Clerk: Chas. J. Good
  - Enrolling Clerk: A. W. Potts
  - Engrossing Clerk: Chas. W. Blay
- Sergeant-at-Arms: A. M. Anderson
  - Assistant Sergeant-at-Arms: John H. White
    - 2nd Assistant Sergeant-at-Arms: M. E. Henika
  - Document Clerk: W. A. Nowell
- Postmaster: F. M. Roberts

== Changes from the 45th Legislature ==
New districts for the 46th Legislature were defined in 1901 Wisconsin Act 164 (Assembly districts) and 1901 Wisconsin Act 309 (Senate districts), passed into law in the 45th Wisconsin Legislature.

=== Senate redistricting ===
==== Summary of changes ====
- 24 districts were left unchanged
- Rock County became a single district again (22) after previously having been divided between two districts.

==== Senate districts ====
Dist.	45th Legislature	46th Legislature
1	Door, Kewaunee, Marinette counties	Door, Kewaunee, Marinette counties
2	Brown, Oconto counties	Brown, Oconto counties
3	Kenosha, Racine counties	Kenosha, Racine counties
4	Milwaukee County (northern quarter)	Milwaukee County (northern quarter)
5	Milwaukee County (city center)	Milwaukee County (city center)
6	Milwaukee County (city northwest)	Milwaukee County (city northwest)
7	Milwaukee County (southern & west)	Milwaukee County (southern & west)
8	Milwaukee County (city south)	Milwaukee County (city south)
9	Adams, Marquette, Waushara, Wood counties	Adams, Marquette, Waushara, Wood counties
10	Pierce, St. Croix counties	Pierce, St. Croix counties
11	Burnett, Douglas, Polk counties	Burnett, Douglas, Polk counties
12	Ashland, Barron, Bayfield, Iron, Sawyer, Washburn counties	Ashland, Bayfield, Price, Sawyer, Taylor, Washburn counties
13	Dodge County	Dodge County
14	Outagamie, Shawano counties	Outagamie, Shawano counties
15	Calumet, Manitowoc counties	Calumet, Manitowoc counties
16	Grant, Iowa counties	Crawford, Grant counties
17	Green, Lafayette, southern Rock counties	Green, Iowa, & Lafayette counties
18	Fond du Lac & Green Lake	Fond du Lac & Green Lake
19	Winnebago County	Winnebago County
20	Ozaukee, Sheboygan county	Ozaukee, Sheboygan county
21	Portage, Waupaca counties	Portage, Waupaca counties
22	Northern Rock, western Jefferson counties	Rock County
23	Walworth, eastern Jefferson counties	Jefferson, Walworth counties
24	Buffalo, Eau Claire, Pepin counties	Chippewa, Eau Claire, Gates counties
25	Clark, Marathon counties	Clark, Marathon counties
26	Dane County	Dane County
27	Columbia, Sauk counties	Columbia, Sauk counties
28	Crawford, Richland, Vernon counties	Richland, Vernon counties
29	Chippewa, Dunn counties	Barron, Buffalo, Dunn, Pepin counties
30	Florence, Forest, Langlade, Lincoln, Oneida, Price, Taylor, Vilas counties	Florence, Forest, Iron, Langlade, Lincoln, Oneida, Vilas counties
31	Jackson, Juneau, Monroe counties	Jackson, Juneau, Monroe counties
32	La Crosse, Trempealeau counties	La Crosse, Trempealeau counties
33	Washington, Waukesha counties	Washington, Waukesha counties

=== Assembly redistricting ===
==== Summary of changes ====
- Ashland County became its own district after previously having been in a shared district with Iron County.
- Lincoln County became its own district after previously having been in a shared district with Taylor County.
- Marinette County went from having 1 district to 2.
- Milwaukee County went from having 15 districts to 16.
- Portage County went from having 2 districts to 1.
- Sheboygan County went from having 3 districts to 2.
- Walworth County went from having 2 districts to 1.

==== Assembly districts ====
County	Districts in 45th Legislature	Districts in 46th Legislature	Change
Adams	Shared with Marquette	Shared with Marquette	Steady
Ashland	Shared with Iron	1 District	▲
Barron	1 District	1 District	Steady
Bayfield	Shared with Sawyer, & Washburn	Shared with Sawyer, & Washburn	Steady
Brown	2 Districts	2 Districts	Steady
Buffalo	Shared with Pepin	Shared with Pepin	Steady
Burnett	Shared with Polk	Shared with Polk	Steady
Calumet	1 District	1 District	Steady
Chippewa	2 Districts	2 Districts	Steady
Clark	1 District	1 District	Steady
Columbia	2 Districts	2 Districts	Steady
Crawford	1 District	1 District	Steady
Dane	3 Districts	3 Districts	Steady
Dodge	2 Districts	2 Districts	Steady
Door	1 District	1 District	Steady
Douglas	2 Districts	2 Districts	Steady
Dunn	1 District	1 District	Steady
Eau Claire	2 Districts	2 Districts	Steady
Florence	Shared with Forest & Langlade	Shared with Forest & Langlade	Steady
Fond du Lac	2 Districts	2 Districts	Steady
Forest	Shared with Florence & Langlade	Shared with Florence & Langlade	Steady
Gates	Did not exist	Shared with Chippewa	Steady
Grant	2 Districts	2 Districts	Steady
Green	1 District	1 District	Steady
Green Lake	1 District	1 District	Steady
Iowa	1 District	1 District	Steady
Iron	Shared with Ashland	Shared with Oneida, Vilas	Steady
Jackson	1 District	1 District	Steady
Jefferson	2 Districts	2 Districts	Steady
Juneau	1 District	1 District	Steady
Kenosha	1 District	1 District	Steady
Kewaunee	1 District	1 District	Steady
La Crosse	2 Districts	2 Districts	Steady
Lafayette	1 District	1 District	Steady
Langlade	Shared with Florence & Forest	Shared with Florence & Forest	Steady
Lincoln	Shared with Taylor	1 District	▲
Manitowoc	2 Districts	2 Districts	Steady
Marathon	2 Districts	2 Districts	Steady
Marinette	1 District	2 Districts	▲
Marquette	Shared with Adams	Shared with Adams	Steady
Milwaukee	15 Districts	16 Districts	▲
Monroe	1 District	1 District	Steady
Oconto	1 District	1 District	Steady
Oneida	Shared with Price, Vilas	Shared with Iron, Vilas	Steady
Outagamie	2 Districts	2 Districts	Steady
Ozaukee	1 District	1 District	Steady
Pepin	Shared with Buffalo	Shared with Buffalo	Steady
Pierce	1 District	1 District	Steady
Polk	1 District	Shared with Burnett	▼
Portage	2 Districts	1 District	▼
Price	Shared with Oneida & Vilas	Shared with Taylor	Steady
Racine	2 Districts	2 Districts	Steady
Richland	1 District	1 District	Steady
Rock	3 Districts	3 Districts	Steady
Sauk	2 Districts	2 Districts	Steady
Sawyer	Shared with Bayfield & Washburn	Shared with Bayfield & Washburn	Steady
Shawano	1 District	1 District	Steady
Sheboygan	3 Districts	2 Districts	▼
St. Croix	1 District	1 District	Steady
Taylor	Shared with Lincoln	Shared with Price	Steady
Trempealeau	1 District	1 District	Steady
Vernon	1 District	1 District	Steady
Vilas	Shared with Oneida, Price	Shared with Iron, Oneida	Steady
Walworth	2 Districts	1 District	▼
Washburn	Shared with Bayfield & Sawyer	Shared with Bayfield & Sawyer	Steady
Washington	1 District	1 District	Steady
Waukesha	2 Districts	2 Districts	Steady
Waupaca	2 Districts	2 Districts	Steady
Waushara	1 District	1 District	Steady
Winnebago	3 Districts	3 Districts	Steady
Wood	1 District	1 District	Steady
