= 47th Wisconsin Legislature =

Wisconsin legislative term for 1905–1906

←	46th	48th	→
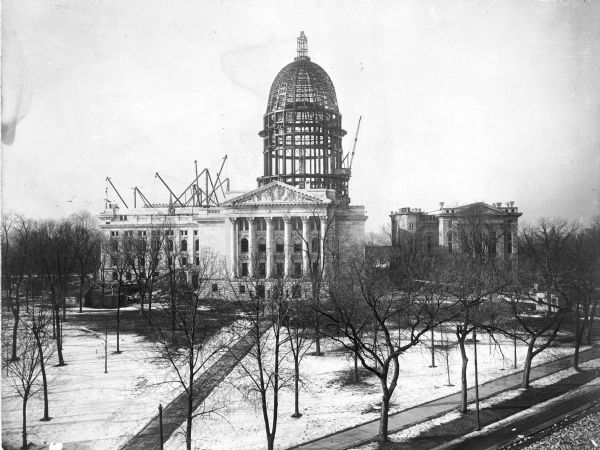
- Wisconsin State Capitol under reconstruction after the 1904 fire

Overview
- Legislative body: Wisconsin Legislature
- Meeting place: Wisconsin State Capitol
- Term: January 2, 1905 – January 7, 1907
- Election: November 8, 1904

Senate
- Members: 33
- Senate President: James O. Davidson (R)^{until Jan. 1, 1906}
- President pro tempore: James J. McGillivray (R)
- Party control: Republican

Assembly
- Members: 100
- Assembly Speaker: Irvine Lenroot (R)
- Party control: Republican

Sessions
- 1st: January 11, 1905 – June 21, 1905

Special sessions
- Dec. 1905 Spec.: December 4, 1905 – December 19, 1905

The Forty-Seventh Wisconsin Legislature convened from January 11, 1905, to June 21, 1905, in regular session, and re-convened for a special session from December 4, 1905, through December 19, 1905. During this term, legislative business was largely held in the north wing of the Wisconsin State Capitol, which was the only part of the capitol to remain intact after the 1904 fire.

This session saw passage of several signature progressive reforms pushed by Governor Robert M. La Follette. Including the creation of a civil service commission to implement merit-based rules for all state government jobs, creation of new powers and commissions for railroad, public health, and tax regulation, and attempts to eliminate lobbying and corporate-funding of political campaigns. This was also the first of several sessions in which Milwaukee County sent a substantial delegation of socialist democrats to the legislature.

Senators representing even-numbered districts were newly elected for this session and were serving the first two years of a four-year term. Assembly members were elected to a two-year term. Assembly members and even-numbered senators were elected in the general election of November 8, 1904. Senators representing odd-numbered districts were serving the third and fourth year of a four-year term, having been elected in the general election of November 4, 1902.

The governor of Wisconsin during both of the legislative sessions of this term was Republican Robert M. La Follette, of Dane County, serving the first year of his third two-year term, having won re-election in the 1904 Wisconsin gubernatorial election. La Follette resigned January 1, 1906, after having been elected United States senator. At that time, the lieutenant governor, Republican James O. Davidson, of Crawford County, then ascended to become governor for the remainder of this legislative term.

== Major events ==
- January 24, 1905: Wisconsin governor Robert M. La Follette was elected United States Senator by the Wisconsin Legislature in joint session. La Follette, who had just been re-elected as governor, then delayed accepting the office until the end of the year, leaving Wisconsin with only one U.S. senator for most of 1905.
- January 30, 1905: The United States Supreme Court decided the case of Swift & Co. v. United States, determining that the commerce clause of the U.S. constitution allowed the Congress to regulate monopolies.
- March 4, 1905: Second inauguration of President Theodore Roosevelt.
- June 30, 1905: Albert Einstein submitted his paper "On the Electrodynamics of Moving Bodies", establishing his theory of special relativity.
- July 21, 1905: The Taft–Katsura agreement was reached between representatives of the United States and the Empire of Japan, to define separate spheres of influence in east Asia.
- September 5, 1905: The Treaty of Portsmouth was signed at Kittery, Maine, by representatives of the Russian Empire and the Empire of Japan, bringing an end to the Russo-Japanese War. U.S. president Theodore Roosevelt was later awarded the Nobel Peace Prize for his part in the negotiations.
- September 27, 1905: Albert Einstein submitted his paper "Does the Inertia of a Body Depend Upon Its Energy Content?", in which he postulated mass–energy equivalence.
- January 1, 1906: Robert La Follette officially resigned as Governor of Wisconsin and began his term as U.S. senator. Lieutenant Governor James O. Davidson was sworn in as the 21st governor of Wisconsin.
- February 7, 1906: The revolutionary British Navy battleship HMS Dreadnought was launched, kicking off a naval arms race with the Imperial German Navy.
- April 3, 1906: William H. Timlin was elected to a new seat on the Wisconsin Supreme Court.
- April 18, 1906: The 1906 San Francisco earthquake destroyed much of San Francisco, resulting in at least 3,000 deaths and leaving over 200,000 homeless.
- May 14, 1906: The Wisconsin Supreme Court decided the case Nunnemacher v. State (129 Wis. 190) in favor of the State of Wisconsin — validating the constitutionality of the new state inheritance tax.
- August 23, 1906: Forces of the United States military arrived in Cuba at the request of embattled president Tomás Estrada Palma, beginning the second occupation of Cuba.
- November 3, 1906: SOS became an internationally recognized signal of distress.
- November 6, 1906: James O. Davidson elected Governor of Wisconsin.

== Major legislation ==
- April 26, 1905: An Act providing for the location of a state normal school at the city of La Crosse, and making an appropriation therefor, 1905 Act 121. Origin of the University of Wisconsin–La Crosse.
- May 12, 1905: An Act prescribing the duties of physicians and others relative to infectious diseases, 1905 Act 192. Mandated reporting of statistics of certain infectious diseases to state health authorities, and setting requirements for quarantining, decontamination, and public information. Also criminalized interfering with public health actions, and mandated reporting of any such interference.
- May 12, 1905: An Act relating to inn-keepers and for the promotion of the public health, 1905 Act 198. Required innkeepers to deny service to people suffering from communicable diseases.
- June 5, 1905: An Act regulating automobiles, auto-cars and other similar motor vehicles on the public highways within the state, 1905 Act 305. First law for registration and licensing of automobiles in the state, and establishing speed limits.
- June 13, 1905: An Act to regulate railroads and other common carriers in this state, create a board of railroad commissioners, fix their salaries, define their duties, prevent the imposition of unreasonable rates, prevent unjust discriminations, insure an adequate railway service, prescribe the mode of procedure and the rules of evidence in relation thereto, prescribe penalties for violations, and making an appropriation therefor, 1905 Act 362. Abolished the statewide elected office of Railroad Commissioner and created a board of commissioners.
- June 14, 1905: An Act in relation to the civil service of the state of Wisconsin and making an appropriation, 1905 Act 363. Established a civil service commission and mandated that all future government appointments must follow merit-based rules defined by the civil service commission.
- June 19, 1905: An Act to amend chapter 569 of the laws of 1901 entitled "An Act to detach certain territory from the county of Chippewa and to create the county of Gates," 1905 Act 463. Renamed Gates County to Rusk County.
- June 20, 1905: An Act prohibiting legislative counsel and agents from attempting to influence members of the legislature other than by appearance before the committees therof, 1905 Act 473. Attempted to ban lobbying.
- June 21, 1905: An Act relating to the use of money by corporations in elections, 1905 Act 492. Attempted to ban corporations from spending money on political campaigns or candidates.
- Joint Resolution granting return of confederate flags to state of Alabama, 1905 Joint Resolution 10. Returned several regimental flags captured by Wisconsin regiments during the American Civil War.
- Joint Resolution providing for an amendment to section 10, article 8 of the constitution, relating to internal improvement, 1905 Joint Resolution 11. First legislative passage of a proposed amendment to authorize appropriations for highway construction.
- 1905 Joint Resolution 12. Proposing an amendment to the state constitution to allow an income tax. This amendment had different language from a similar 1903 proposed amendment, and therefore was the first legislative passage of the amendment.
- Joint Resolution to amend section 10 article 5 of the constitution relating to the approval of bills by the governor, 1905 Joint Resolution 14. First legislative passage of a proposed amendment to put a time limit on gubernatorial vetos.
- Joint Resolution providing for an amemlnient to section 1 of article 3 of the constitution, relating to electors, 1905 Joint Resolution 15. First legislative passage of a proposed amendment to remove voting rights from non-citizens.

== Summary ==
=== Senate summary ===
Senate partisan composition Democratic: 4 seats Social Dem.: 1 seat Republican: 28 seats

	Party (Shading indicates majority caucus)			Total	
	Dem.	S.D.	Rep.	Total	Vacant
End of previous Legislature	3	0	29	32	1
Start of 1st Session	4	1	28	33	0
Final voting share	15.15%		84.85%		
Beginning of the next Legislature	5	1	27	33	0

=== Assembly summary ===
Assembly partisan composition Democratic: 11 seats Social Dem.: 4 seats Republican: 85 seats

	Party (Shading indicates majority caucus)			Total	
	Dem.	S.D.	Rep.	Total	Vacant
End of previous Legislature	24	0	73	97	3
Start of 1st Session	11	4	85	100	0
From Sept. 11, 1906 (Note: Republican Herman Heinecke (Sheboygan 1st District) died September 11, 1906.)	11	4	84	99	1
Final voting share	15%		85%		
Beginning of the next Legislature	19	5	76	100	0

== Sessions ==
- 1st Regular session: January 11, 1905 – June 21, 1905
- December 1905 Special session: December 4, 1905 – December 19, 1905

== Leaders ==
=== Senate leadership ===
- President of the Senate: James O. Davidson (R) (until Jan. 1, 1906)
- President pro tempore: James J. McGillivray (R–Black River Falls)

=== Assembly leadership ===
- Speaker of the Assembly: Irvine Lenroot (R–Superior)

== Members ==
=== Members of the Senate ===
Members of the Senate for the Forty-Seventh Wisconsin Legislature:

Senate partisan representation Democratic: 4 seats Social Dem.: 1 seat Republican: 28 seats

Dist.	Counties	Senator	Residence	Party
01	Door, Kewaunee, & Marinette	Harlan P. Bird	Wausaukee	Rep.
02	Brown & Oconto	Henry F. Hagemeister	Green Bay	Rep.
03	Kenosha & Racine	Otis W. Johnson	Racine	Rep.
04	Milwaukee (Northern Part)	Theodore C. Froemming	Milwaukee	Rep.
05	Milwaukee (City Center)	Charles C. Rogers	Milwaukee	Rep.
06	Milwaukee (City Northwest)	Jacob Rummel	Milwaukee	Soc.D.
07	Milwaukee (Southern & Western County)	Barney Eaton	Milwaukee	Rep.
08	Milwaukee (City South)	Julius E. Roehr	Milwaukee	Rep.
09	Adams, Marquette, Waushara, & Wood	Herman C. Wipperman	Grand Rapids	Rep.
10	Pierce & St. Croix	James A. Frear	Hudson	Rep.
11	Burnett, Douglas, & Polk	George Hudnall	Superior	Rep.
12	Ashland, Bayfield, Price, Sawyer, Taylor, & Washburn	Albert W. Sanborn	Ashland	Rep.
13	Dodge	William C. North	Fox Lake	Dem.
14	Outagamie & Shawano	Fred M. Wilcox	Appleton	Rep.
15	Calumet & Manitowoc	Samuel W. Randolph	Manitowoc	Dem.
16	Crawford & Grant	Edward E. Burns	Platteville	Rep.
17	Green, Iowa, & Lafayette	Harry C. Martin	Darlington	Rep.
18	Fond du Lac & Green Lake	Charles H. Smith	Markesan	Dem.
19	Winnebago	Ephraim E. Stevens	Oshkosh	Rep.
20	Ozaukee & Sheboygan	George W. Wolff	Rhine	Rep.
21	Portage & Waupaca	William H. Hatton	New London	Rep.
22	Rock	John M. Whitehead	Janesville	Rep.
23	Jefferson & Walworth	Zadoc P. Beach	Whitewater	Rep.
24	Chippewa, Eau Claire, & Gates	James H. Noble	Eau Claire	Rep.
25	Clark & Marathon	Andrew L. Kreutzer	Wausau	Rep.
26	Dane	Albert M. Stondall	Madison	Rep.
27	Columbia & Sauk	George Wylie	Leeds	Rep.
28	Richland, & Vernon	Oliver Munson	Viroqua	Rep.
29	Barron, Buffalo, Dunn, & Pepin	James H. Stout	Menomonie	Rep.
30	Florence, Forest, Iron, Langlade, Lincoln, Oneida, & Vilas	James A. Wright	Merrill	Rep.
31	Jackson, Juneau, & Monroe	James J. McGillivray	Black River Falls	Rep.
32	La Crosse & Trempealeau	Thomas Morris	La Crosse	Rep.
33	Washington & Waukesha	Ernst Merton	Waukesha	Dem.

=== Members of the Assembly ===
Members of the Assembly for the Forty-Seventh Wisconsin Legislature:

Assembly partisan composition Democratic: 11 seats Social Dem.: 4 seats Republican: 85 seats

Milwaukee County districts

Senate District	County	Dist.	Representative	Party	Residence
09	Adams & Marquette		John A. Henry	Rep.	Easton
12	Ashland		Edward B. Gordon	Rep.	Gordon
29	Barron		George E. Scott	Rep.	Prairie Farm
12	Bayfield, Sawyer, & Washburn		Lorenzo Clausen	Rep.	Washburn
02	Brown	1	Willard Burdeau	Rep.	Flintville
02	Brown	2	Maurice B. Brennan	Rep.	Morrison
29	Buffalo & Pepin		Fred J. Bohri	Rep.	Fountain City
11	Burnett & Polk		Amund Jerdee	Rep.	Lincoln
15	Calumet		Daniel R. Curtin	Rep.	Woodville
24	Chippewa & Gates	1	Thomas A. Roycraft	Rep.	
24	Chippewa & Gates	2	L. L. Thayer	Rep.	Bloomer
25	Clark		William S. Irvine	Rep.	Beaver
27	Columbia	1	John Scott	Rep.	Dekorra
27	Columbia	2	William R. Turner	Rep.	Columbus
16	Crawford		James Dinsdale	Rep.	Soldiers Grove
26	Dane	1	Ernest Warner	Rep.	Madison
26	Dane	2	Henry Huber	Rep.	Stoughton
26	Dane	3	John S. Donald	Rep.	Mount Horeb
13	Dodge	1	Frank S. Bauer	Dem.	LeRoy
13	Dodge	2	Daniel L. Hannifin	Dem.	Portland
01	Door		Charles Reynolds	Rep.	Jacksonport
11	Douglas	1	Irvine Lenroot	Rep.	Superior
11	Douglas	2	Wallace W. Andrew	Rep.	Superior
29	Dunn		Ole G. Kinney	Rep.	Colfax
24	Eau Claire	1	Charles A. Evans	Rep.	Eau Claire
24	Eau Claire	2	C. N. Saugen	Rep.	Pleasant Valley
30	Florence, Forest, & Langlade		E. F. Nelson	Rep.	Rolling
18	Fond du Lac	1	Christian Pickart	Dem.	Marshfield
18	Fond du Lac	2	John W. Powell	Rep.	Rosendale
16	Grant	1	Duncan McGregor	Rep.	Platteville
16	Grant	2	Joseph P. Chandler	Rep.	Montford
17	Green		Fred Ties	Rep.	Brodhead
18	Green Lake		Gard Miller	Rep.	
17	Iowa		Roy C. Smelker	Rep.	Dodgeville
30	Iron, Oneida, & Vilas		Edward A. Everett	Rep.	Eagle River
31	Jackson		Winfield S. Braddock	Rep.	
23	Jefferson	1	Edward Racek	Dem.	Watertown
23	Jefferson	2	Charles Greenwood	Rep.	Lake Mills
31	Juneau		P. A. Cleary	Dem.	Elroy
03	Kenosha		Walker M. Curtiss	Rep.	Salem
01	Kewaunee		Anton G. Schauer	Rep.	Carlton
32	La Crosse	1	John S. Durland	Rep.	La Crosse
32	La Crosse	2	Thomas Johnson	Rep.	Holland
17	Lafayette		Richard E. Tarrell	Rep.	Elk Grove
30	Lincoln		Hall L. Brooks	Rep.	Tomahawk
15	Manitowoc	1	Simon F. Wehrwein	Rep.	Newton
15	Manitowoc	2	Lawrence W. Ledvina	Rep.	Kellnersville
25	Marathon	1	Fred Prehn	Rep.	Marathon City
25	Marathon	2	August F. Marquardt	Rep.	Wausau
01	Marinette	1	Edward W. LeRoy	Rep.	Marinette
01	Marinette	2	James F. Slight	Rep.	Peshtigo
04	Milwaukee	1	Joseph M. Crowley	Dem.	Milwaukee
05	Milwaukee	2	J. S. Bletcher	Rep.	Milwaukee
07	Milwaukee	3	George E. Page	Rep.	Milwaukee
05	Milwaukee	4	Fred C. Westfahl	Rep.	Milwaukee
08	Milwaukee	5	William Alldridge	Soc.D.	Milwaukee
05	Milwaukee	6	Thomas F. Ramsey	Dem.	Milwaukee
07	Milwaukee	7	Frederick Hartung	Rep.	Wauwatosa
08	Milwaukee	8	Oscar F. Thieme	Rep.	Milwaukee
06	Milwaukee	9	Edmund J. Berner	Soc.D.	Milwaukee
06	Milwaukee	10	Louis Metzler	Rep.	Milwaukee
08	Milwaukee	11	Frederick Brockhausen	Soc.D.	Milwaukee
06	Milwaukee	12	August Dietrich	Rep.	Milwaukee
04	Milwaukee	13	Henry Holle	Rep.	Milwaukee
07	Milwaukee	14	John Szymarek	Dem.	Milwaukee
04	Milwaukee	15	Philip Hamm	Rep.	Milwaukee
06	Milwaukee	16	August W. Strehlow	Soc.D.	Milwaukee
31	Monroe		George P. Stevens	Rep.	Tomah
02	Oconto		Henry Johnson	Rep.	Suring
14	Outagamie	1	Fred Petersen	Dem.	Appleton
14	Outagamie	2	Charles J. Hagen	Rep.	Black Creek
20	Ozaukee		Peter Pierron	Rep.	Belgium
10	Pierce		W. L. Oltman	Rep.	Diamond Bluff
21	Portage		Fred J. Carpenter	Rep.	Stevens Point
12	Price, & Taylor		John B. Hagarty	Rep.	Medford
03	Racine	1	William H. Bell	Rep.	Racine
03	Racine	2	John O. Thomas	Rep.	Caledonia
28	Richland		J. E. Coffland	Dem.	Richland Center
22	Rock	1	Allen S. Baker	Rep.	Evansville
22	Rock	2	Pliny Norcross	Rep.	Janesville
22	Rock	3	William O. Hansen	Rep.	Beloit
27	Sauk	1	J. B. Ragatz	Rep.	Prairie du Sac
27	Sauk	2	David B. Hulburt	Rep.	Loganville
14	Shawano		Jonas Swenholt	Rep.	Wittenberg
20	Sheboygan	1	Herman Heinecke	Rep.	Sheboygan
20	Sheboygan	2	August Meyers	Rep.	Howards Grove
10	St. Croix		Julius Beer	Rep.	St. Joseph
32	Trempealeau		Herman Ekern	Rep.	Whitehall
28	Vernon		Andrew H. Dahl	Rep.	Westby
23	Walworth		Frank H. Johnson	Rep.	Darien
33	Washington		B. S. Potter	Dem.	West Bend
33	Waukesha	1	James A. McKenzie	Rep.	Vernon
33	Waukesha	2	Roderick Ainsworth	Rep.	Merton
21	Waupaca	1	P. H. Peterson	Rep.	
21	Waupaca	2	George E. Beedle	Rep.	
09	Waushara		Byron Storm	Rep.	Plainfield
19	Winnebago	1	William M. Perry	Rep.	Oshkosh
19	Winnebago	2	A. D. Eldridge	Rep.	Neenah
19	Winnebago	3	John A. Fridd	Rep.	
09	Wood		Eli Winch	Rep.	Marshfield

== Committees ==
=== Senate committees ===
- Senate Committee on Agriculture – G. Wylie, chair
- Senate Committee on Assessment and Collection of Taxes – Hudnall, chair
- Senate Committee on Corporations – Beach, chair
- Senate Committee on Education – J. H. Stout, chair
- Senate Committee on Enrolled Bills – Merton, chair
- Senate Committee on Engrossed Bills – Wilcox, chair
- Senate Committee on Federal Relations – Froemming, chair
- Senate Committee on Finance, Banks, and Insurance – J. E. Roehr, chair
- Senate Committee on the Judiciary – A. L. Kreutzer, chair
- Senate Committee on Legislative Expenses – Stevens, chair
- Senate Committee on Manufactures and Labor – Rummel, chair
- Senate Committee on Military Affairs – Frear, chair
- Senate Committee on Privileges and Elections – Martin, chair
- Senate Committee on Public Health – Noble, chair
- Senate Committee on Public Lands – C. C. Rogers, chair
- Senate Committee on Railroads – Hatton, chair
- Senate Committee on Roads and Bridges – G. W. Wolff, chair
- Senate Committee on State Affairs – Munson, chair
- Senate Committee on Town and County Organizations – Sanborn, chair

=== Assembly committees ===
- Assembly Committee on Agriculture – J. A. Fridd, chair
- Assembly Committee on Assessment and Collection of Taxes – A. H. Dahl, chair
- Assembly Committee on Cities – W. W. Andrew, chair
- Assembly Committee on Corporations – F. J. Carpenter, chair
- Assembly Committee on Dairy and Food – J. S. Donald, chair
- Assembly Committee on Education – D. McGregor, chair
- Assembly Committee on Enrolled Bills – F. J. Bohri, chair
- Assembly Committee on Engrossed Bills – J. S. Bletcher, chair
- Assembly Committee on Federal Relations – A. J. Jerdee, chair
- Assembly Committee on Finance, Banks, and Insurance – R. E. Tarrell, chair
- Assembly Committee on the Judiciary – H. L. Ekern, chair
- Assembly Committee on Legislative Expenditures – R. C. Smelker, chair
- Assembly Committee on Lumber and Mining – G. E. Beedle, chair
- Assembly Committee on Manufactures – P. H. Hamm, chair
- Assembly Committee on Military Affairs – J. A. Henry, chair
- Assembly Committee on Privileges and Elections – E. W. LeRoy, chair
- Assembly Committee on Public Health and Sanitation – J. Dinsdale, chair
- Assembly Committee on Public Improvements – J. P. Chandler, chair
- Assembly Committee on Public Lands – G. P. Stevens, chair
- Assembly Committee on Railroads – W. S. Braddock, chair
- Assembly Committee on Roads and Bridges – T. Johnson, chair
- Assembly Committee on State Affairs – O. G. Kinney, chair
- Assembly Committee on Town and County Organization – W. S. Irvine, chair
- Assembly Committee on Ways and Means – F. Hartung, chair

=== Joint committees ===
- Joint Committee on Charitable and Penal Institutions – Hagemeister(Sen.) & H. Johnson (Asm.), co-chairs
- Joint Committee on Claims – Burns (Sen.) & R. Ainsworth (Asm.), co-chairs
- Joint Committee on Fish and Game – Wipperman (Sen.) & J. Swenholt (Asm.), co-chairs
- Joint Committee on Forestry and Lumber – Bird (Sen.) & E. E. Winch (Asm.), co-chairs
- Joint Committee on Printing – Morris (Sen.) & J. B. Hagarty (Asm.), co-chairs
- Joint Committee on Revision of Bills – Whitehead (Sen.) & R. C. Smelker (Asm.), co-chairs
- Special Joint Committee on Capitol and Grounds – Stout (Sen.) & I. L. Lenroot (Asm.), co-chairs
- Special Joint Committee on Rules – Johnson (Sen.) & H. L. Ekern (Asm.), co-chairs

== Employees ==
=== Senate employees ===
- Chief Clerk: Leo K. Eaton
  - Journal Clerk: A. R. Emerson
  - Bookkeeper: J. D. O'Brien
  - General Clerk: Ralph Pomeroy
  - Engrossing Clerk: H. Wipperman Jr.
  - Enrolling Clerk: O. G. Briggs
- Sergeant-at-Arms: Russell C. Falconer
  - Assistant Sergeant-at-Arms: Charles Good
  - Document Clerk: Thomas Walby
- Postmaster: Christoph Paulus

=== Assembly employees ===
- Chief Clerk: C. O. Marsh
  - Journal Clerk: Chas. A. Leicht
  - Bookkeeper: C. E. Shaffer
  - General Clerk: Ralph E. Smith
    - 2nd General Clerk: L. B. Nagler
  - Enrolling Clerk: A. W. Pott
  - Engrossing Clerk: J. E. Noyes
- Sergeant-at-Arms: Nicholas Streveler
  - Assistant Sergeant-at-Arms: C. H. Collins
    - 2nd Assistant Sergeant-at-Arms: Walter Eagan
  - Document Clerk: Burne Pollock
- Postmaster: John Harris
