= 45th Wisconsin Legislature =

Wisconsin legislative term for 1901–1902

| ← | 44th | 46th | → |
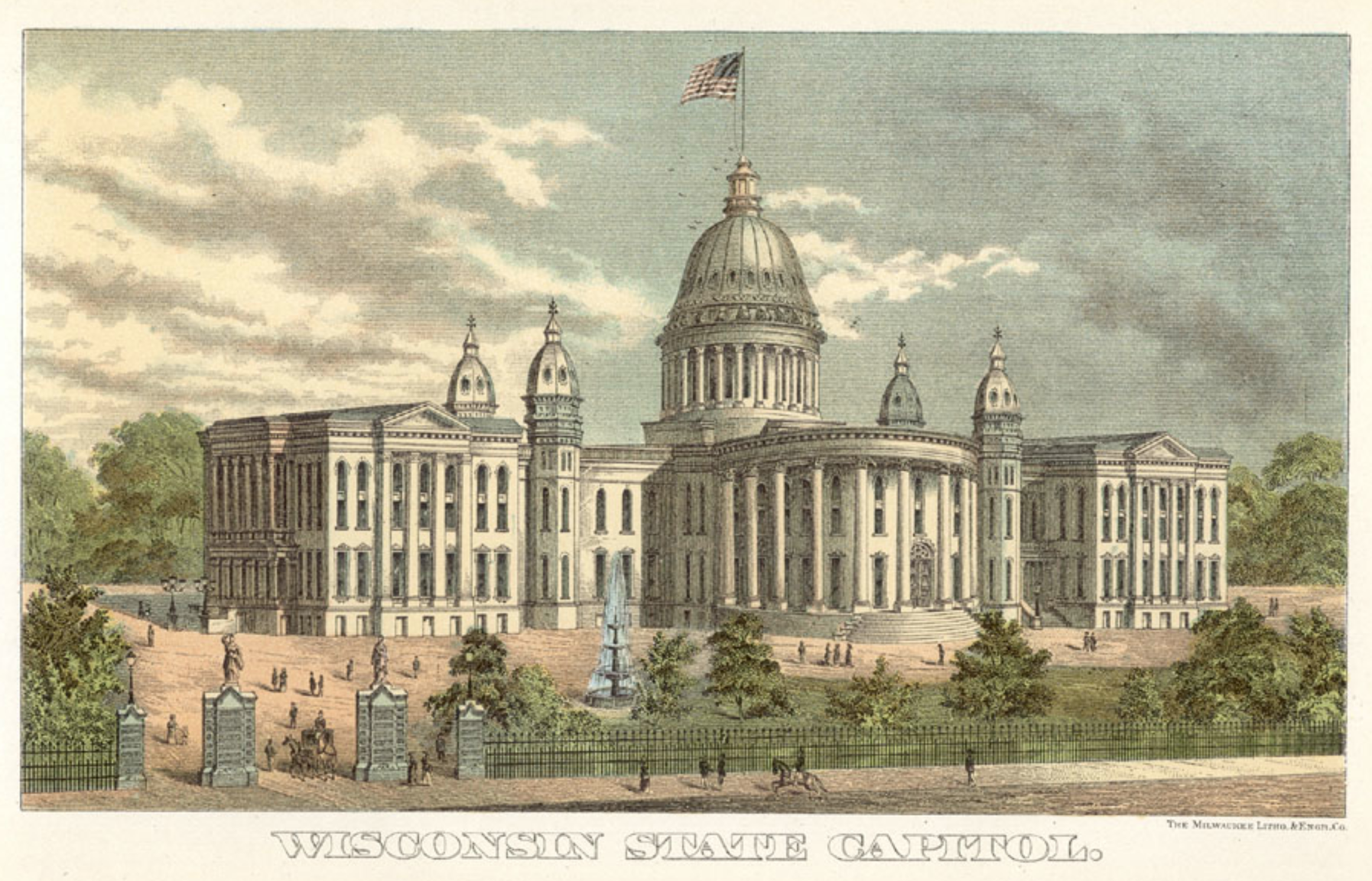
- Wisconsin State Capitol, 1887

Overview
- Legislative body: Wisconsin Legislature
- Meeting place: Wisconsin State Capitol
- Term: January 7, 1901 – January 5, 1903
- Election: November 6, 1900

Senate
- Members: 33
- Senate President: Jesse Stone (R)^{until May 11, 1902}
- President pro tempore: James J. McGillivray (R)
- Party control: Republican

Assembly
- Members: 100
- Assembly Speaker: George H. Ray (R)
- Party control: Republican

Sessions
- 1st: January 9, 1901 – May 15, 1901

The Forty-Fifth Wisconsin Legislature convened from January 9, 1901, to May 15, 1901, in regular session.

Senators representing even-numbered districts were newly elected for this session and were serving the first two years of a four-year term. Assembly members were elected to a two-year term. Assembly members and even-numbered senators were elected in the general election of November 6, 1900. Senators representing odd-numbered districts were serving the third and fourth year of a four-year term, having been elected in the general election of November 8, 1898.

The governor of Wisconsin during this entire term was Republican Robert M. La Follette, of Dane County, serving a two-year term, having won election in the 1900 Wisconsin gubernatorial election.

== Major events ==
- January 7, 1901: Inauguration of Robert M. La Follette as the 20th Governor of Wisconsin. He was the first governor of Wisconsin to have been born in Wisconsin.
- January 22, 1901: Queen Victoria of the United Kingdom died and was succeeded by her son, Edward VII.
- March 4, 1901: Second inauguration of U.S. President William McKinley.
- September 6, 1901: President William McKinley was shot by anarchist Leon Czolgosz in Buffalo, New York. He would die 8 days later.
- September 14, 1901: Vice President Theodore Roosevelt was sworn in as the 26th President of the United States, following the death of President William McKinley.
- October 1, 1901: The Wisconsin Legislative Reference Library was opened in the State Capitol under chief Charles McCarthy. The library was the first of its kind and was a model for the Congressional Research Service.
- April 2, 1902: The Electric Theatre, the first movie theater in the United States, opened in Los Angeles, California.
- May 11, 1902: Wisconsin Lieutenant Governor Jesse Stone died of stomach cancer at Watertown, Wisconsin.
- June 29, 1902: The federal Spooner Act, named for Wisconsin's U.S. senator John Coit Spooner, was signed by President Theodore Roosevelt, to purchase land that would become the Panama Canal Zone.
- July 1, 1902: The Philippine Organic Act was signed by President Theodore Roosevelt, bringing an end to the Philippine–American War.
- November 4, 1902: Wisconsin general election:
  - Robert M. La Follette re-elected as Governor of Wisconsin.
  - Voters approved an amendment to the Wisconsin constitution to authorize a general banking law and remove previous referendum requirements for banking laws.
  - Voters approved an amendment to the Wisconsin constitution to convert the Superintendent of Public Instruction to a nonpartisan, 4-year office, with pay set by legislation.
  - Voters approved an amendment to the Wisconsin constitution to prohibit individuals, companies, political committees, and other entities from providing any free pass, free transportation, or free communication to any officer of state, local, or county government in Wisconsin.

== Major legislation ==
- April 12, 1901: An Act to apportion and district anew the state of Wisconsin into assembly districts, 1901 Act 164.
- May 6, 1901: An Act to apportion and district anew the state of Wisconsin into senate districts, 1901 Act 309.
- May 13, 1901: An Act to apportion and district anew the state of Wisconsin into congressional districts, 1901 Act 398.
- Joint Resolution agreeing to a proposed amendment to article XI of the constitution of the state of Wisconsin, giving the legislature power to pass a general banking law, 1901 Joint Resolution 2. This was the second required legislative approval of this amendment, which was then ratified by voters in November 1902.
- Joint Resolution agreeing to constitutional amendment, 1901 Joint Resolution 3. Amendment (1) converting the Superintendent of Public Instruction of Wisconsin from a political to nonpartisan office, (2) moving the elections for superintendent from Fall to Spring, (3) changing the term from two years to four years, (4) moving inauguration from the first Monday in the January following the election to the first Monday in the July following the election, and (5) enabling the Legislature to set the pay of the superintendent through law. This was the second required legislative approval of this amendment, which was then ratified by voters in November 1902.
- Joint Resolution for the submission of an amendment to section 1 of article VII of the constitution relating to the justices of the supreme court, 1901 Joint Resolution 8. Proposed adding two more justices to the Wisconsin Supreme Court, and proposing a process to determine the chief justice when two justices held equal seniority.
- Joint Resolution agreeing to a proposed amendment to article XIII of the constitution of the state of Wisconsin, to prohibit the pass system, 1901 Joint Resolution 9. This was the second required legislative approval of this amendment, which was then ratified by voters in November 1902.
- Joint Resolution providing for an amendment of section 23, article IV of the constitution and for separate county government in certain counties, 1901 Joint Resolution 12. Suggested an amendment to allow the Legislature to establish a separate system of county government that could be applied to creating new counties around cities with populations greater than 100,000.

== Summary ==
=== Senate summary ===
Senate partisan composition Democratic: 2 seats Republican: 31 seats

| | Party (Shading indicates majority caucus) | | Total | |
| | Dem. | Rep. | Total | Vacant |
|---|---|---|---|---|
| End of previous Legislature | 2 | 31 | 33 | 0 |
| Start of 1st Session | 2 | 31 | 33 | 0 |
| From April 29, 1901 | 2 | 30 | 32 | 1 |
| From December 12, 1901 | 2 | 29 | 31 | 2 |
| Final voting share | 6.25% | 90.63% | | |
| Beginning of the next Legislature | 3 | 30 | 33 | 0 |

=== Assembly summary ===
Assembly partisan composition Democratic: 19 seats Republican: 81 seats

| | Party (Shading indicates majority caucus) | | Total | |
| | Dem. | Rep. | Total | Vacant |
|---|---|---|---|---|
| End of previous Legislature | 19 | 81 | 100 | 0 |
| Start of 1st Session | 19 | 81 | 100 | 0 |
| Final voting share | 19% | 81% | | |
| Beginning of the next Legislature | 25 | 74 | 99 | 1 |

== Sessions ==
- 1st Regular session: January 9, 1901 – May 15, 1901

== Leaders ==
=== Senate leadership ===
- President of the Senate: Jesse Stone (R) (until May 11, 1902)
- President pro tempore: James J. McGillivray (R–Black River Falls)

=== Assembly leadership ===
- Speaker of the Assembly: George H. Ray (R–La Crosse)

== Members ==
=== Members of the Senate ===
Members of the Senate for the Forty-Fifth Wisconsin Legislature:

Senate partisan representation Democratic: 2 seats Republican: 31 seats

| Dist. | Counties | Senator | Residence | Party |
|---|---|---|---|---|
| 01 | Door, Kewaunee, & Marinette | De Wayne Stebbins | Algoma | Rep. |
| 02 | Brown & Oconto | Henry F. Hagemeister | Green Bay | Rep. |
| 03 | Kenosha & Racine | John F. Reynolds | Randall | Rep. |
| 04 | Milwaukee (Northern Part) | J. Herbert Green | Milwaukee | Rep. |
| 05 | Milwaukee (City Center) | Frank A. Anson | Milwaukee | Rep. |
| 06 | Milwaukee (City Northwest) | William Devos | Milwaukee | Rep. |
| 07 | Milwaukee (Southern & Western County) | Barney Eaton | Milwaukee | Rep. |
| 08 | Milwaukee (City South) | Julius E. Roehr | Milwaukee | Rep. |
| 09 | Adams, Marquette, Waushara, & Wood | Thomas Fearne (died April 29, 1901) | Richfield | Rep. |
| 10 | Pierce & St. Croix | Orville W. Mosher | New Richmond | Rep. |
| 11 | Burnett, Douglas, & Polk | Edgar G. Mills | West Superior | Rep. |
| 12 | Ashland, Barron, Bayfield, Iron, Sawyer, & Washburn | William O'Neil | Washburn | Rep. |
| 13 | Dodge | Michael A. Jacobs | Beaver Dam | Dem. |
| 14 | Outagamie & Shawano | T. A. Willy | Appleton | Rep. |
| 15 | Calumet & Manitowoc | Norman Knudson | Manitowoc | Rep. |
| 16 | Grant & Iowa | Edward E. Burns | Platteville | Rep. |
| 17 | Green, Lafayette, & southern Rock | Harry C. Martin | Darlington | Rep. |
| 18 | Fond du Lac & Green Lake | Elmer D. Morse | Princeton | Rep. |
| 19 | Winnebago | Henry I. Weed | Oshkosh | Dem. |
| 20 | Ozaukee & Sheboygan | George W. Wolff | Rhine | Rep. |
| 21 | Portage & Waupaca | William H. Hatton | New London | Rep. |
| 22 | Northern Rock & western Jefferson | John M. Whitehead | Janesville | Rep. |
| 23 | Walworth & eastern Jefferson | John H. Harris | Elkhorn | Rep. |
| 24 | Buffalo, Eau Claire, & Pepin | Frank McDonough | Eau Claire | Rep. |
| 25 | Clark & Marathon | Andrew L. Kreutzer | Wausau | Rep. |
| 26 | Dane | George P. Miller | Madison | Rep. |
| 27 | Columbia & Sauk | William G. Bissell | Lodi | Rep. |
| 28 | Crawford, Richland, & Vernon | Oliver Munson | Viroqua | Rep. |
| 29 | Chippewa & Dunn | James H. Stout | Menomonie | Rep. |
| 30 | Florence, Forest, Langlade, Lincoln, Oneida, Price, Taylor, & Vilas | Daniel E. Riordan | Eagle River | Rep. |
| 31 | Jackson, Juneau, & Monroe | James J. McGillivray | Black River Falls | Rep. |
| 32 | La Crosse & Trempealeau | John C. Gaveney | Arcadia | Rep. |
| 33 | Washington & Waukesha | Alfred M. Jones | Waukesha | Rep. |

=== Members of the Assembly ===
Members of the Assembly for the Forty-Fifth Wisconsin Legislature:

Assembly partisan composition Democratic: 19 seats Republican: 81 seats

Milwaukee County districts

| Senate District | County | Dist. | Representative | Party | Residence |
|---|---|---|---|---|---|
| 09 | Adams & Marquette | | John A. Henry | Rep. | Easton |
| 12 | Ashland & Iron | | George P. Rossman | Rep. | Ashland |
| 12 | Barron | | Kapp Rasmussen | Rep. | Rice Lake |
| 12 | Bayfield, Sawyer, & Washburn | | W. L. McCormick | Rep. | Hayward |
| 02 | Brown | 1 | Willard Burdeau | Rep. | Suamico |
| 02 | Brown | 2 | Michael J. Flaherty | Dem. | Morrison |
| 24 | Buffalo & Pepin | | Charles W. Gilman | Rep. | Mondovi |
| 11 | Burnett & Polk | | Ole Erickson | Rep. | Grantsburg |
| 15 | Calumet | | Isaac N. McComb | Dem. | Brillion |
| 29 | Chippewa | 1 | Joseph Meloney | Rep. | Bloomer |
| 29 | Chippewa | 2 | John W. Thomas | Rep. | Chippewa Falls |
| 25 | Clark | | Lafayette M. Sturdevant | Rep. | Neillsville |
| 27 | Columbia | 1 | George McMillan | Rep. | Arlington |
| 27 | Columbia | 2 | Lynn N. Coapman | Rep. | Wyocena |
| 28 | Crawford | | John A. Haggerty | Rep. | Ferryville |
| 26 | Dane | 1 | E. Ray Stevens | Rep. | Madison |
| 26 | Dane | 2 | Ole K. Roe | Rep. | Stoughton |
| 26 | Dane | 3 | Herman Fessenfeld | Dem. | Black Earth |
| 13 | Dodge | 1 | Henry R. Moldenhauer | Dem. | Lebanon |
| 13 | Dodge | 2 | Josephus Williams | Dem. | Fox Lake |
| 01 | Door | | Henry J. Overbeck | Rep. | Sturgeon Bay |
| 11 | Douglas | 1 | Irvine Lenroot | Rep. | Superior |
| 11 | Douglas | 2 | Wallace W. Andrew | Rep. | Superior |
| 29 | Dunn | | Albert R. Hall | Rep. | Knapp |
| 24 | Eau Claire | 1 | John H. Young | Rep. | Eau Claire |
| 24 | Eau Claire | 2 | Charles Silkworth | Rep. | Otter Creek |
| 30 | Florence, Forest, & Langlade | | Leroy McGill | Rep. | Florence |
| 18 | Fond du Lac | 1 | Raphael Katz | Dem. | Fond du Lac |
| 18 | Fond du Lac | 2 | James Fenelon | Rep. | Ripon |
| 16 | Grant | 1 | Delford Brunson | Rep. | Fennimore |
| 16 | Grant | 2 | Sherman E. Smalley | Rep. | Cuba City |
| 17 | Green | | A. Clarke Dodge | Rep. | Monroe |
| 18 | Green Lake | | William J. Middleton | Rep. | Berlin |
| 16 | Iowa | | Bjorn Holland | Rep. | Hollandale |
| 31 | Jackson | | Edwin A. Miller | Rep. | Hixton |
| 23 | Jefferson | 1 | George J. Kern | Dem. | Sullivan |
| 22 | Jefferson | 2 | Lewis Benson | Dem. | Oakland |
| 31 | Juneau | | John M. Barlow | Rep. | New Lisbon |
| 03 | Kenosha | | S. Dwight Slade | Rep. | Wheatland |
| 01 | Kewaunee | | William Rogers | Dem. | Kewaunee |
| 32 | La Crosse | 1 | George H. Ray | Rep. | La Crosse |
| 32 | La Crosse | 2 | Andrew C. Hansen | Rep. | Farmington |
| 17 | Lafayette | | Philo A. Orton | Rep. | Darlington |
| 30 | Lincoln & Taylor | | Edward W. Whitson | Rep. | Tomahawk |
| 15 | Manitowoc | 1 | Joseph Willott Jr. | Rep. | Manitowoc |
| 15 | Manitowoc | 2 | Jonas Gagnon | Dem. | Two Rivers |
| 25 | Marathon | 1 | Alfred Cook | Dem. (Note: Republican elected as a Democrat, and he basically acted as a member of the Republican caucus during the term.) | Unity |
| 25 | Marathon | 2 | Herman Miller | Rep. | Wausau |
| 01 | Marinette | | Frederick M. Price | Rep. | Peshtigo |
| 05 | Milwaukee | 1 | Francis B. Keene | Rep. | Milwaukee |
| 05 | Milwaukee | 2 | Maurice A. McCabe | Dem. | Milwaukee |
| 07 | Milwaukee | 3 | Levi A. Miner | Rep. | South Milwaukee |
| 05 | Milwaukee | 4 | August Zinn | Rep. | Milwaukee |
| 08 | Milwaukee | 5 | Fred Esau | Dem. | Milwaukee |
| 04 | Milwaukee | 6 | Francis Eline | Dem. | Milwaukee |
| 07 | Milwaukee | 7 | Frederick Hartung | Rep. | Wauwatosa |
| 08 | Milwaukee | 8 | Reinhold Thiessenhusen | Rep. | Milwaukee |
| 06 | Milwaukee | 9 | John C. Karel | Dem. | Milwaukee |
| 06 | Milwaukee | 10 | George Rankl | Rep. | Milwaukee |
| 08 | Milwaukee | 11 | Herman Pomrening | Rep. | Milwaukee |
| 06 | Milwaukee | 12 | Charles Barker | Rep. | Milwaukee |
| 04 | Milwaukee | 13 | Henry Soltwedel | Rep. | Milwaukee |
| 07 | Milwaukee | 14 | August Gawin | Dem. | Milwaukee |
| 04 | Milwaukee | 15 | John E. Norton | Rep. | Granville |
| 31 | Monroe | | Evan R. Jones | Rep. | Sparta |
| 02 | Oconto | | Henry Johnson | Rep. | Suring |
| 30 | Oneida, Price, & Vilas | | Nathan E. Lane | Rep. | Phillips |
| 14 | Outagamie | 1 | Warren L. Root | Rep. | Appleton |
| 14 | Outagamie | 2 | David Hodgins | Rep. | Hortonville |
| 20 | Ozaukee | | Herman Schellenberg | Dem. | Cedarburg |
| 10 | Pierce | | Harry J. Park | Rep. | Spring Valley |
| 21 | Portage | 1 | William F. Collins | Dem. | Stevens Point |
| 21 | Portage | 2 | Fred J. Frost | Rep. | Almond |
| 03 | Racine | 1 | John W. Owen | Rep. | Racine |
| 03 | Racine | 2 | George Ela | Rep. | Rochester |
| 28 | Richland | | John H. Babb | Rep. | Sylvan |
| 22 | Rock | 1 | Charles L. Valentine | Rep. | Janesville |
| 22 | Rock | 2 | Almeron Eager | Rep. | Evansville |
| 17 | Rock | 3 | Halvor Cleophas | Rep. | Beloit |
| 27 | Sauk | 1 | Franklin Johnson | Rep. | Baraboo |
| 27 | Sauk | 2 | Evan W. Evans | Dem. | Spring Green |
| 14 | Shawano | | Jonas Swenholt | Rep. | Shawano |
| 20 | Sheboygan | 1 | Martin O. Galaway | Rep. | Sheboygan |
| 20 | Sheboygan | 2 | George W. Spratt | Rep. | Sheboygan Falls |
| 20 | Sheboygan | 3 | Henry Krumrey | Rep. | Plymouth |
| 10 | St. Croix | | Henry Anderson | Rep. | Baldwin |
| 32 | Trempealeau | | Eugene F. Clark | Rep. | Galesville |
| 28 | Vernon | | Andrew H. Dahl | Rep. | Westby |
| 23 | Walworth | 1 | Everett E. Dow | Rep. | La Grange |
| 23 | Walworth | 2 | Albert E. Smith | Rep. | Delavan |
| 33 | Washington | | P. G. Duerrwaechter | Rep. | Germantown |
| 33 | Waukesha | 1 | James Johnston | Rep. | Mukwonago |
| 33 | Waukesha | 2 | Roderick Ainsworth | Rep. | Merton |
| 21 | Waupaca | 1 | Emil H. Steiger | Rep. | Fremont |
| 21 | Waupaca | 2 | Andrew Jensen | Rep. | New London |
| 09 | Waushara | | David Evans Jr. | Rep. | Aurora |
| 19 | Winnebago | 1 | Herman E. Manuel | Rep. | Oshkosh |
| 19 | Winnebago | 2 | Edwin A. Williams | Rep. | Neenah |
| 19 | Winnebago | 3 | Christian Sarau | Rep. | Oshkosh |
| 09 | Wood | | Frank A. Cady | Rep. | Marshfield |

== Committees ==
=== Senate committees ===
- Senate Committee on Agriculture – Reynolds, chair
- Senate Committee on Assessment and Collection of Taxes – Whitehead, chair
- Senate Committee on Banks and Insurance – Roehr, chair
- Senate Committee on Bills on Third Reading – Gaveney, chair
- Senate Committee on Corporations – Devos, chair
- Senate Committee on Education – Stout, chair
- Senate Committee on Enrolled Bills – Fearne, chair
- Senate Committee on Engrossed Bills – Miller, chair
- Senate Committee on Federal Relations – Martin, chair
- Senate Committee on the Judiciary – Kreutzer, chair
- Senate Committee on Legislative Expenses – Willy, chair
- Senate Committee on Manufactures and Labor – Anson, chair
- Senate Committee on Military Affairs – Knudsen, chair
- Senate Committee on Privileges and Elections – Hatton, chair
- Senate Committee on Public Health – Eaton, chair
- Senate Committee on Public Lands – Hagemeister, chair
- Senate Committee on Railroads – Harris, chair
- Senate Committee on Roads and Bridges – O'Neil, chair
- Senate Committee on State Affairs – Jones, chair
- Senate Committee on Town and County Organizations – Riordans, chair

=== Assembly committees ===
- Assembly Committee on Agriculture – R. Holland, chair
- Assembly Committee on Assessment and Collection of Taxes – A. R. Hall, chair
- Assembly Committee on Bills on Third Reading – G. Ela, chair
- Assembly Committee on Cities – F. B. Keene, chair
- Assembly Committee on Corporations – L. M. Sturdevant, chair
- Assembly Committee on Dairy and Food – S. D. Slade, chair
- Assembly Committee on Education – J. Johnston, chair
- Assembly Committee on Enrolled Bills – A. Jensen, chair
- Assembly Committee on Engrossed Bills – J. M. Barlow, chair
- Assembly Committee on Federal Relations – C. Sarau, chair
- Assembly Committee on Finance, Banks and Insurance – E. A. Williams, chair
- Assembly Committee on the Judiciary – P. A. Orton, chair
- Assembly Committee on Legislative Expenditures – M. O. Galaway, chair
- Assembly Committee on Lumber and Mining – A. E. Smith, chair
- Assembly Committee on Manufactures – R. F. Thiessenhusen, chair
- Assembly Committee on Military Affairs – A. C. Dodge, chair
- Assembly Committee on Privileges and Elections – E. H. Steiger, chair
- Assembly Committee on Public Health and Sanitation – J. Willott, chair
- Assembly Committee on Public Improvements – E. F. Clark, chair
- Assembly Committee on Public Lands – D. Evans, chair
- Assembly Committee on Railroads – J. W. Thomas, chair
- Assembly Committee on Roads and Bridges – F. J. Frost, chair
- Assembly Committee on State Affairs – K. E. Rasmussen, chair
- Assembly Committee on Town and County Organizations – W. J. Middleton, chair
- Assembly Committee on Ways and Means – H. Overbeck, chair

=== Joint committees ===
- Joint Committee on Charitable and Penal Institutions – Stebbins (Sen.) & A. H. Dahl (Asm.), co-chairs
- Joint Committee on Claims – Mills (Sen.) & Fred Hartung (Asm.), co-chairs
- Joint Committee on Fish and Game – Green (Sen.) & August Zinn (Asm.), co-chairs
- Joint Committee on Forestry and Lumber – McDonough (Sen.) & Ole Erickson (Asm.), co-chairs
- Joint Committee on Printing – Munson (Sen.) & Ole K. Roe (Asm.), co-chairs
- Special Joint Committee on Apportionment – Riordan (Sen.) & George H. Ray (Asm.), co-chairs

== Employees ==
=== Senate employees ===
==== Senate Chief Clerk's Department ====
- Chief Clerk: Walter Houser
  - Journal Clerk: F. E. Andrews
  - Bookkeeper: Andrew Rood
  - Proofreader: I. S. Dunn
  - Engrossing Clerk: Fred Peterson
    - Assistant Engrossing Clerk: D. G. Sampson
  - Enrolling Clerk: A. B. Cargill
    - Assistant Enrolling Clerk: G. A. Tucker
  - Index Clerk: Frank Eaton
    - Assistant Index Clerk: Ed. F. Ditmar
  - Clerk for the Judiciary Committee: Percy S. Elwell
  - Clerk for the Committee on Bills on 3rd Reading: John Meili
  - Clerk for the Committee on Claims: G. I. McDonald
  - Clerk for the Committee on State Affairs: Hugh Wilson
  - Committee Clerks and Assistants:
    - Arthur M. Fisher
    - M. V. Dorwin
  - Stenographers:
    - E. B. Yule
    - John D. Gill
    - Robert M. Davis
    - Nelson M. Wilcox
  - Comparing Clerks:
    - E. D. Peake
    - Mrs. Maud Barnes
    - Ida M. Goss
    - Oscar Kreutzer
  - Telephone Attendant: Harry Lamphere
  - Custodian of the Engrossing Room: B. H. Strow
  - Custodian of the Enrolling Room: A. Burson

==== Senate Sergeant-at-Arms' Department ====
- Sergeant-at-Arms: Charles A. Pettibone
  - Assistant Sergeant-at-Arms: O. B. Moon
- Postmaster: Christoph Paulus
  - Assistant Postmaster: H. W. Rood
- Document Clerk: E. A. Hanks
  - Document Room Attendant: L. L. Lathrop
- Doorkeepers:
  - Fred Hanson
  - Robert Lowerre
  - Richard Lubnow
  - S. A. Pettibone
- Gallery Attendant: Will Thomas
- General Attendants:
  - Hugo Jeske
  - F. F. Massant
- Night Watch: Walther Abel
- Janitor: Dana Woodworth
- Custodian: Jacob Ditschler
- Laborer: James F. Holt
- Messengers:
  - Harry Kelly
  - Darwin Fallott
  - Jno. Taylor
  - Jno. F. Trainor
  - Harry E. May
  - E. C. Mills
  - Emil J. Reuther
  - William Holmes

=== Assembly employees ===
==== Assembly Chief Clerk's Department ====
- Chief Clerk: Winslow A. Nowell
  - Assistant Chief Clerk: Frederic W. Coon
  - Journal Clerks:
    - Fred Nelson
    - Edward H. McNeill
  - Bookkeepers:
    - Jos. B. Foster
    - C. E. Shaffer
  - Proofreader: J. H. Waggoner
  - Engrossing Clerk: C. H. Carter
    - Assistant Engrossing Clerk: Claire Currier
  - Enrolling Clerk: J. K. Smith
    - Assistant Enrolling Clerk: John Eckstrome
  - Index Clerk: Fred H. Hartwell
    - Assistant Index Clerk: Bert S. Oscar
  - Stationary Clerk: Henry H. McGraw
  - Clerk for the Judiciary Committee: James McKesson
  - Clerk for the Committee on Bills on 3rd Reading: Edgar I. Waring
  - Clerk for the Committee on Enrolled Bills: Jessie A. Jensen
  - Clerk for the Committee on Engrossed Bills: James DeGarmo
  - Clerk for the Committee on State Affairs: E. N. Bowers
  - General Committee Clerks:
    - Thomas Toner
    - Thomas Hayes
  - Stenographers:
    - Almeda Sturdevant
    - Louis Kloepfel
    - Raymond Frazier
    - Charles Voigt
  - Comparing Clerks:
    - Mary E. Chadwick
    - Effie Heydlauff
    - Aluna Christie
    - Nellie L. Proctor

==== Assembly Sergeant-at-Arms' Department ====
- Sergeant-at-Arms: A. M. Anderson
  - Assistant Sergeant-at-Arms: Jeremiah Wallace Baldock
- Postmaster: E. B. Tousley
  - Assistant Postmaster: J. A. Kellman
- Document Clerks:
  - J. H. Foster
  - J. J. Osborn
- Day Attendant: H. T. Mower
- Doorkeepers:
  - Victor Cronk
  - Charles J. Weisser
  - J. B. Nuegent
  - Lansing Williams
- Gallery Attendants:
  - Julius Howland
  - Peter Steinert
- Porter: George Coulter
- Flagman: Frank Voeltner
- Night Watch: J. R. Fisher
- Committee Room Custodians:
  - Robert Drews
  - Abe Herman
- Cloak Room Attendants:
  - J. T. Johnson
  - J. R. Jones
