= John Norton =

John Norton may refer to:

== Politicians ==
- Sir John Norton, 3rd Baronet (1620–1687), British MP for Hampshire
- John Norton (journalist) (1858–1916), Australian politician, published Truth newspapers
- John Norton (MP for Sandwich), (1406–1407), British MP for Sandwich
- John E. Norton, American politician from Wisconsin
- John N. Norton (1878–1960), American politician from Nebraska
- John R. Norton III (1929–2016), American farmer and politician
- John T. Norton (1865–1942), American lawyer and politician from New York

== Sports ==
- John Norton (athlete) (1893–1979), American athlete in track and field and Olympic medalist
- John Norton (water polo) (1899–1987), American water polo player and Olympic medalist

== Others ==
- John Norton, 5th Baron Grantley (1855–1943), British peer and numismatist
- Rev. John Norton, founding pastor of Old Ship Church in Hingham, Massachusetts
- John Norton (academic) (died 1462), English churchman and chancellor of New College, Oxford
- John Norton (architect) (1823–1904), English Victorian Gothic revivalist who remodelled Tyntesfield
- John Norton (author) (1936–2015), American poet and fiction writer
- John Norton (bishop) (1891–1963), Australian Roman Catholic bishop and Diocese of Bathurst
- John Norton (divine) (1606–1663), English Puritan divine and one of the first authors in British North America
- John Norton (Mohawk chief) (born c. 1760), Native American who played a prominent role in the War of 1812
- John Norton (priest) (1840–1920), Anglican priest in Canada
- John Norton (soldier) (1918–2004), United States Army general and co-founder of the US Army Air Corps
- John Bruce Norton (1815–1883), British lawyer and educationist
- John D. Norton (born 1953), Australian professor of the history and philosophy of science at the University of Pittsburgh
- John Henry Norton (1855–1923), Australian Roman Catholic bishop of Port Augusta
- John Pitkin Norton (1822–1852), American educator, agricultural chemist, and author who taught at Yale University
- John W. Norton (1876–1934), American muralist

== See also ==
- Jonathan Norton (born 1958), American drummer and singer
- Jack Norton (1882–1958), actor
- Jack Norton (filmmaker) (born 1980), American filmmaker and children's musician
- John Morton (disambiguation)
- John Player Norton, motorbikes manufactured by Norton and sponsored by John Player
