= Rankl =

Rankl is a surname. Notable people with the surname include:

- George Rankl (1867–?), American politician
- Karl Rankl (1898–1968), Austrian-British conductor and composer

== See also ==
- RANKL (Receptor activator of nuclear factor kappa-B ligand)
