= George Wylie (politician) =

American politician (1848–1926)

Member of the Wisconsin Senate from the 27th district
- In office January 5, 1903 – January 7, 1907
- Preceded by: William G. Bissell
- Succeeded by: Charles L. Pearson

Member of the Wisconsin State Assembly from the Columbia 2nd district
- In office January 4, 1897 – January 7, 1901
- Preceded by: Joseph Sanderson
- Succeeded by: Lynn N. Coapman

Personal details
- Born: January 6, 1848 Campbeltown, Scotland, UK
- Died: December 8, 1926 (aged 78) Madison, Wisconsin, U.S.
- Resting place: Windsor Congregational Cemetery, Windsor, Wisconsin
- Party: Republican
- Spouse: Ida Carpenter
- Children: Fred M. Wylie^{(b. 1883; died 1950)}; Christine Gertrude (Queen)^{(b. 1887; died 1920)}

George Wylie (January 6, 1848 – December 8, 1926) was a Scottish American immigrant, livestock farmer, and Republican politician. He was a member of the Wisconsin State Senate (1903, 1905) and State Assembly (1897, 1899), representing Columbia and Sauk counties.

== Biography ==
Wylie was born on January 6, 1848, in Campbeltown, Scotland. Around 1857, he emigrated with his parents to Wauwatosa, Wisconsin, before moving to a farm in Leeds, Wisconsin, in 1864. After retiring from farming, Wylie settled in Morrisonville, Wisconsin.

He married Ida Carpenter Wylie (1852–1930) in 1884, with whom he had a son. Wylie died on December 8, 1926, in Madison, Wisconsin. He was buried at Windsor Congregational Cemetery in Windsor, Wisconsin.

== Political career ==
Wylie was a member of the Assembly in 1897 in 1899 and of the Senate from 1903 to 1904. In addition, he was a member of the county board of Columbia County, Wisconsin. He was a Republican.
