= David G. Williams =

American politician (1840–1903)

Member of the Wisconsin State Assembly from the Columbia 2nd district
- In office January 5, 1903 – August 26, 1903 (death)
- Preceded by: Lynn N. Coapman
- Succeeded by: William Rufus Turner

Personal details
- Born: November 25, 1840 Denbighshire, Wales, UK
- Died: August 26, 1903 (aged 62) Cambria, Wisconsin, U.S.
- Cause of death: Sepsis
- Resting place: Cambria Cemetery, Cambria, Wisconsin
- Party: Republican
- Spouses: Emma L. Williams (m. 1865; died 1870); Sarah O. Picket (m. 1871–1903)
- Children: with Emma Williams; Eliza Lentie (Roberts)^{(b. 1866; died 1929)}; with Sarah Picket; Jennie N. (Scharf)^{(b. 1877; died 1953)}; Floyd E. Williams^{(b. 1879; died 1880)}
- Occupation: Miller

Military service
- Allegiance: United States
- Branch/service: United States Volunteers; Union Army
- Years of service: 1862–1865
- Rank: Sergeant, USV
- Unit: 32nd Reg. Wis. Vol. Infantry
- Battles/wars: American Civil War

David G. Williams (November 25, 1840 – August 26, 1903) was a Welsh American immigrant, miller, and Republican politician. He was a member of the Wisconsin State Assembly, representing Columbia County during the 1903 session.

== Biography ==
Williams was born in Denbighshire, Wales, and his family emigrated to Wisconsin in 1850, settling in Delafield. During the Civil War, he served in the 32nd Wisconsin Infantry Regiment. He served as president of the village of Cambria, Wisconsin, for five years and was a member of the school board for six years. He served as sheriff of Columbia County, Wisconsin, from 1885 to 1887.

Williams was elected to the Assembly in 1902, and he introduced a bill to prohibit marriage between whites and blacks, known as the Williams Bill. He was a life-long Republican.

Williams died in Cambria on August 26, 1903, while still a member of the Assembly. His death was a result of blood poisoning caused by a rat bite.

Wisconsin State Assembly
Preceded by Lynn N. Coapman	Member of the Wisconsin State Assembly from the Columbia 2nd district January 5, 1903 – August 26, 1903	Succeeded by William Rufus Turner
