= Robert Lang =

Robert Lang may refer to:

- Robert Lang (ice hockey) (born 1970), Czech National Hockey League player
- Robert Lang (cricketer) (1840–1908), cricketer
- Robert Lang (cyclist) (1917–1997), Swiss cyclist
- Robert Lang (rower) (born 1955), Australian Olympic rower
- Robert Lang (swimmer) (born 1984), British swimmer at the 2007 World Championships
- Robert A. Lang, American politician
- Robert J. Lang (born 1961), American origami theorist and physicist
- Robert Lang (actor) (1934–2004), English stage, television and film actor
- Robert Lang, owner of Robert Lang Studios
- Bob Lang, bassist in the 1960s band The Mindbenders
- Robert Lang (producer), producer in Canada
- Robert Lang (football manager) (1886–1941), Austrian football player and coach
- Robert Hamilton Lang (1832–1913), Scottish-born financier, diplomat and collector of antiquities

== See also ==
- Mutt Lange (Robert John Lange, born 1948), record producer and songwriter
