= James MacGillivray =

James MacGillivray or McGillivray may refer to:

== Politicians ==
- James McGillivray, politician in Social Credit Party of Canada leadership elections
- James J. McGillivray, Canadian-born American politician

== Others ==
- James Pittendrigh Macgillivray, Scottish poet
- James MacGillivray (journalist), see Paul Bunyan
- James MacGillivray, dancer with Scottish Dance Theatre
- James McGillivray (soccer), coach for St. Catharines Wolves
