= Andrew Jensen =

Andrew Jensen may refer to:

- Andrew Jenson (1850–1941), or Jensen, Danish immigrant to the United States and historian of the Church of Jesus Christ of Latter-day Saints
- Andrew Jensen (politician) (1852–1936), Danish American immigrant, farmer, and member of the Wisconsin State Assembly
