= August W. Strehlow =

American politician

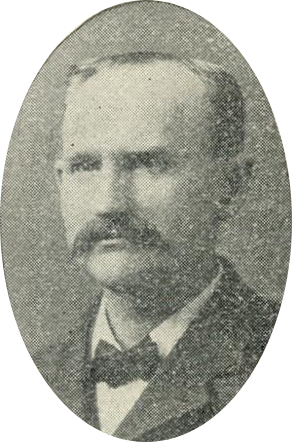
Strehlow c. 1905

August W. Strehlow (born January 31, 1867) was a housepainter and building contractor from Milwaukee, Wisconsin, who served one term as a Socialist member of the Wisconsin State Assembly from 1905 to 1906.

== Background ==
Strehlow was born in Stettin (now Szczecin, then part of the Kingdom of Prussia) on January 31, 1867, and was educated in the public schools there. He came to America in 1881, and followed the trade of hardwood finishing and housepainting, later becoming a contractor in this line of business; he became a member of the Painters' union, was active in organized labor, and became a member of the Social Democratic Party, soon to become the Socialist Party of America (but still called "Social Democratic Party" in Wisconsin). Strehlow died on December 22, 1943, in Milwaukee, Wisconsin.

Small archival collections for Strehlow are located at both Milwaukee Public Library and Milwaukee County Historical Society.

== Elected office ==
In 1902 he ran for the State Assembly from the 16th Milwaukee County district on the Socialist ticket, losing to Republican Fred B. Breitwisch, with 1128 votes to Breitwisch's 1228. He was also a Socialist candidate for county supervisor in 1902.

In 1904 he defeated Breitwisch, with 1,549 votes against 1,349 for Breitwisch, 533 for Democrat Joseph Heller and 11 for Carl Oberhen of the Socialist Labor Party.

In 1906 he chose to run for the Milwaukee Common Council, and was succeeded in the Assembly by fellow Socialist and labor activist Frank J. Weber (a carpenter). He served on the Common Council for at least 32 years By 1946 he had shifted to the Milwaukee County Board of Supervisors.
