= Phillip Rossman =

American politician

Phillip Rossman (March 4, 1836 – December 8, 1891) was an American businessman and politician.

Born in Germany, Rossman and his parents emigrated to the United States and settled in Sheboygan County, Wisconsin, in 1851. In 1871, Rossman moved to Clark County, Wisconsin, and settled in the town of Beaver where he had a farm and saw mill. He was a farmer and in the lumber and manufacturing business. Rossman served as chairman of the Beaver Town Board and as Beaver Town Treasurer; he also served on the Clark County Board of Supervisors and was a Republican. In 1891, Rossman served in the Wisconsin State Assembly until his death. Rossman died in a hospital in Chicago, Illinois of cancer of the abdomen and had undergone surgery.
