= Frank T. Hassa =

American politician

Frank T. Hassa was a member of the Wisconsin State Assembly.

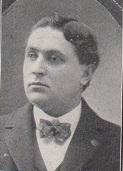
Frank Hassa portrait, from the 1903 Wisconsin Blue Book.

== Biography ==
Hassa was born on June 6, 1873, in Lenox, Massachusetts. He moved to Wisconsin in 1879, settling in Milwaukee, Wisconsin. He was educated at St. Stanislaus' Parochial school, and the public schools of Milwaukee.

== Career ==
Hassa was elected to the Assembly as a Democrat in 1902, receiving 1,686 votes. He defeated Republican Dr. W.S. Mount, who received 1,484 votes, and Social Democrat Willis C. Acker, who received 1,006 votes. Previously, he had been employed at the Allis-Chalmers pattern shop for over a decade.
