= William S. Irvine =

American politician

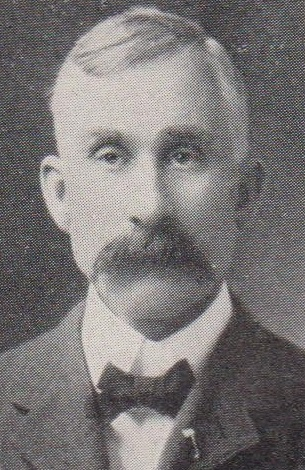
William S. Irvine's photo, from the 1903 edition of the Wisconsin Blue Book.

William Stephens Irvine (March 18, 1851 – November, 1942) was a member of the Wisconsin State Assembly.

== Biography ==
Irvine was born on March 18, 1851, in Lona Cora, Maryland. He came with his parents to Wisconsin in 1852, settling in Trempealeau County. He moved to Clark County in 1870, and began farming there in 1873. Irvine was also in the lumber business. He represented his town, the town of Beaver and county board for 16 years, was a tax assessor for four years, and was appointed tax commissioner for Eau Claire County for the year 1901. Irvine was also chairman of the town board (similar to city council) and served on the school board.

== Career ==
He was elected as a Republican member of the Wisconsin State Assembly in 1902, receiving 2,561 votes against 1,679 votes cast for Richard B. Slater (Dem.), and 167 votes for Wilbur Cutts (Pro.). Irvine was re-elected in 1904. Later, he served five terms as Sergeant-at-Arms of the Assembly.
