= William Finnegan (politician) =

American politician

William Finnegan was a member of the Wisconsin State Assembly during the 1903 session. Finnegan was a Republican. He was a native of Green Bay, Wisconsin.
