= Daniel L. Hannifin =

American politician

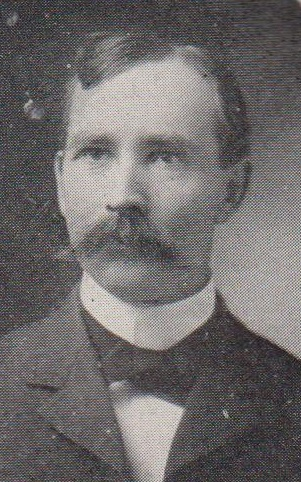
Daniel Hannifin's photo, from the 1903 edition of the Wisconsin Blue Book.

Daniel L. Hannifin (June 12, 1863 in Portland, Dodge County, Wisconsin – ?), was a member of the Wisconsin State Assembly. He graduated from high school in Waterloo, Wisconsin. For twelve years he was employed at a teaching school, and was also a farmer. He served as bookkeeper and secretary of the Waterloo Canning and Pickeling Company, and was the town clerk of Portland, Wisconsin.

== Career ==
Hannifin was elected to the Assembly in 1902. Additionally, he served as Clerk of Portland. He was a Democrat.

== See also ==
- The Political Graveyard
