= Herman Heinecke =

American politician

Herman Heinecke (November 14, 1859 – September 11, 1906) was an American businessman and politician.

Born in Sheboygan, Wisconsin, Heinecke went to school in Sheboygan, Wisconsin and was a carriage painter, From 1881 to 1884, Heinecke worked in Iowa and Hancock, Michigan. Then, in 1884, Heinecke returned to Sheboygan and worked as a butcher. Heinecke served on the Sheboygan Common Council and was a Republican. In 1905, Heinecke served in the Wisconsin State Assembly and died while still in office.
