= Franklin Johnson (Wisconsin politician) =

American politician

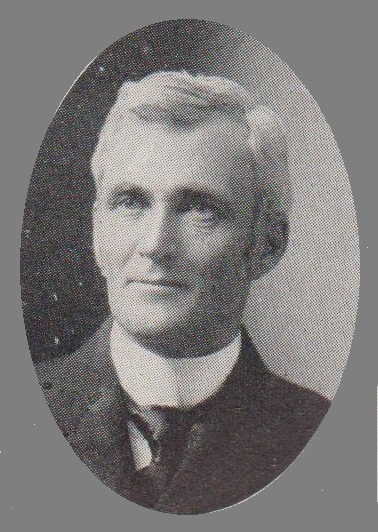
Franklin Johnson's portrait from the 1903 edition of the Wisconsin Blue Book.

Franklin Johnson (1849–1935), was a former Republican member of the Wisconsin State Assembly.

Johnson was born in 1849, in Greenfield, Wisconsin, where he was educated in the public schools and at home. He taught school for several terms. In 1881 he moved to Baraboo and engaged in fruit growing. In 1884 and 1885 he was clerk of the town of Baraboo, and again starting in 1892.

He was elected to the Wisconsin State Assembly in 1900, and served multiple terms.
