= John Norton (priest) =

John George Norton (1840–1920) was an Anglican priest who held senior leadership positions in Canada during the first quarter of the 20th century.

Norton was born in Arvagh; and educated at Trinity College, Dublin. He was ordained deacon in 1865; and priest in 1866. He served curacies in Kilmacrenan and Mullaghbrack; and incumbencies in Durham and Montreal. He was Archdeacon of St Andrews, PQ from 1900 to 1902; a Canon of Montreal from 1893 to 1902; and Archdeacon of Montreal from 1902 until his death in October 1920.
