= Scott F. Verbeck =

American politician (1860–1939)

Scott F. Verbeck (October 1860 – February 12, 1939) was a member of the Wisconsin State Assembly.

== Biography ==
Verbeck was born in Columbia County, Wisconsin in 1860. He died of a heart attack in Mazomanie, Wisconsin in 1939, leaving a widow, one son, three daughters, and an estate worth $10,500.

== Career ==
Verbeck was elected to the Assembly in 1902. He was a Republican.
