= Peter Bartzen =

American businessman and politician

Peter Bartzen (September 8, 1857 – August 11, 1934) was an American businessman and politician.

Born in Sheboygan, Wisconsin, Bartzen was in the general merchandise and saloon business. Bartzen served on the school board and, in 1903, he served in the Wisconsin State Assembly as a Democrat. Bartzen died at the home of his daughter and son-in-law in Great Falls, Montana after a long illness.
