= Rudolph W. E. Fritzke =

American politician (1849–1931)

Rudolph Wilhelm E. Fritzke (October 7, 1849 – October 17, 1931) was a German-American politician who was a member of the Wisconsin State Assembly. Born in Prussia, he moved to the United States in 1867, later working as a teacher in Fond du Lac, Wisconsin and Milwaukee, Wisconsin. He served as a truant officer for the Milwaukee schools for 20 years.

== Political career ==
Fritzke was elected to the Assembly in 1902. He was a Democrat and represented the 13th district.
