= James A. Brittan =

American politician

James A. Brittan was an American politician. He was a Republican member of the Wisconsin State Assembly during the 1903 session. A native of Beloit, Wisconsin, he represented the 3rd District of Rock County, Wisconsin.
