= Philip Hamm =

American politician

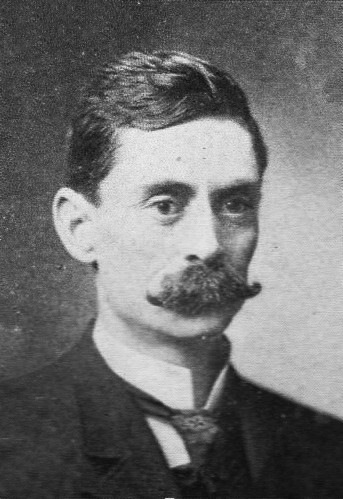
Philip Hamm's portrait from the 1903 edition of the Wisconsin Blue Book.

Philip H. Hamm (born 1859) was a Republican member of the Wisconsin State Assembly.

Hamm was born on July 5, 1859, in Reeseville, Wisconsin, where he received his education. He moved to Milwaukee in 1886 and worked as a real estate and insurance agent. He served as a member of the Milwaukee common council for four years, was a trustee of the Milwaukee public library for two years, and was a deputy game warden for one year.

He was elected to the Wisconsin State Assembly in 1902, beating Henry Schuz (Democrat), Anton Palmo (Social Democrat), and Gustav Griebel (Independent).
