= Patrick J. Cosgrove =

American politician

Patrick J. Cosgrove was a Republican member of the Wisconsin State Assembly during the 1903 session. He represented the 1st District of Chippewa County, Wisconsin.
