= Cornelius Sidler =

American politician

Cornelius Sidler (July 18, 1871 – September 20, 1925) was a lawyer and politician.

Born in Milwaukee, Wisconsin, Sidler graduated from the University of Wisconsin and University of Wisconsin Law School in 1902. He was an attorney. In 1903, he served in the Wisconsin State Assembly and was a Republican.

Sidler died at his home in Grants Pass, Oregon.
