= Frank H. Johnson =

American politician

Frank H. Johnson (December 13, 1867 - ?) was a member of the Wisconsin State Assembly.

== Biography ==
Johnson was born on December 13, 1867, in what is now Madison County, Montana. In 1875, he settled in Darien (town), Wisconsin.

== Career ==
Johnson was elected to the Assembly in 1904. He was a Republican.
