= Ernest A. Strong =

American politician

Ernest A. Strong was a member of the Wisconsin State Assembly during the 1903 session. Strong represented Ashland County, Wisconsin. He was a Republican.
