= Andrew Jensen (politician) =

American politician (1852–1936)

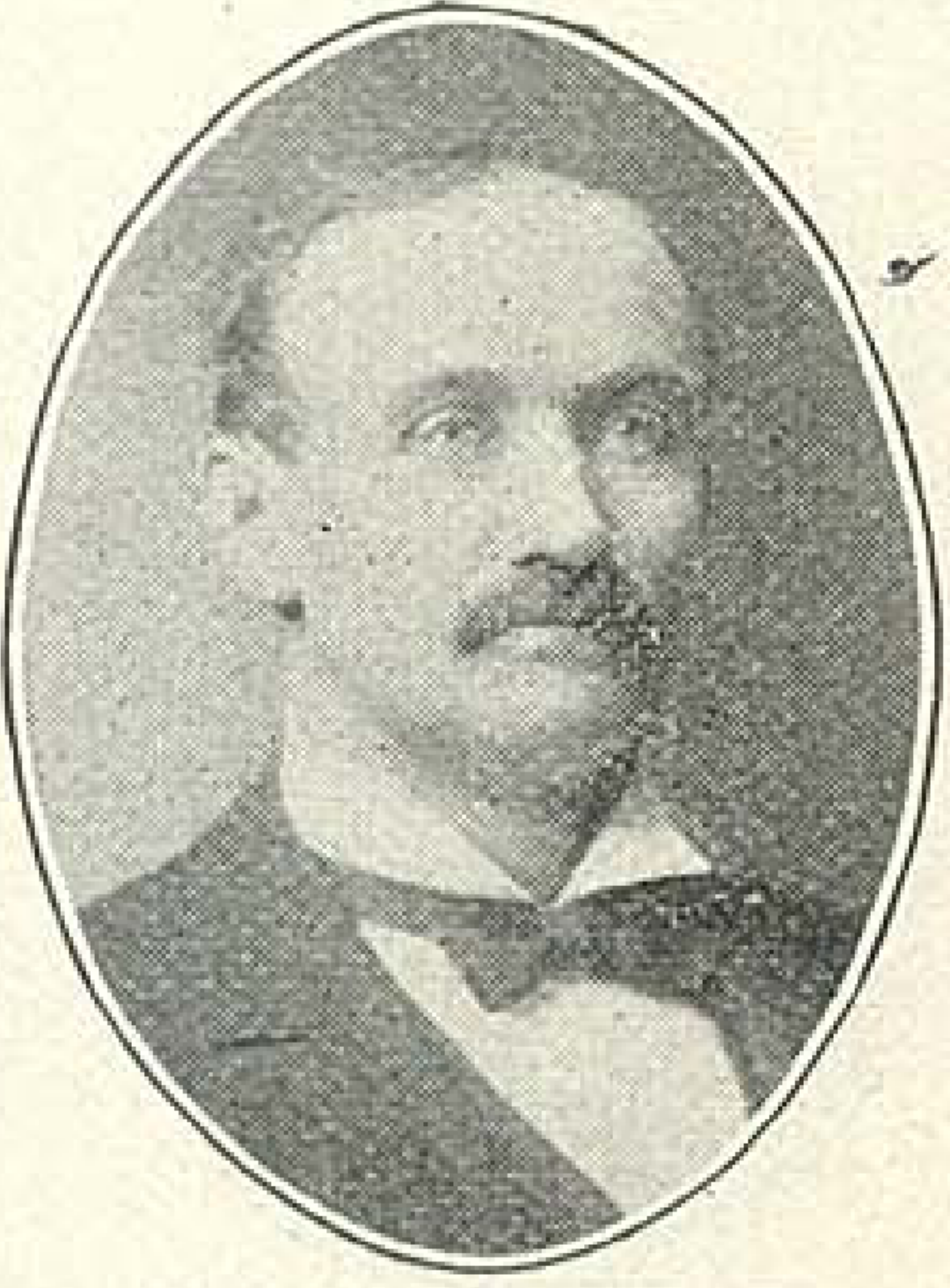
- From The Blue Book of the State of Wisconsin (1901)

Member of the Wisconsin State Assembly from the Waupaca 2nd district
- In office January 4, 1897 – January 5, 1903
- Preceded by: Philip A. Ham
- Succeeded by: George E. Beedle

Personal details
- Born: June 2, 1852 Copenhagen, Denmark
- Died: September 30, 1936 (aged 84) Bismarck, North Dakota, U.S.
- Resting place: Ogdensburg Cemetery, Ogdensburg, Wisconsin
- Party: Republican
- Spouse: married
- Children: Marion (McIntyre)
- Occupation: Farmer, lumbering

Andrew Jensen (June 2, 1852 – September 30, 1936) was a Danish American immigrant, farmer, and Republican politician. He was a member of the Wisconsin State Assembly, representing southern Waupaca County in the 1897, 1899, and 1901 sessions.

== Biography ==
Andrew Jensen was born in Copenhagen, Denmark, in June 1852. He was raised and educated there and emigrated to the United States with his parents in 1867, locating at Ogdensburg, Wisconsin.

He went to work in the lumber business in 1871 and, in 1884, used his earnings to purchase a farm in the town of Helvetia, Wisconsin, in Waupaca County.

He was active with the Republican Party of Wisconsin, and was elected to the town board and school board. In 1896, he was elected to the Wisconsin State Assembly, running on the Republican ticket. He represented Waupaca County's 2nd Assembly district, which then comprised most of the southern half of the county. He was subsequently re-elected in 1898 and 1900, serving in the 43rd, 44th, and 45th sessions of the legislature.

While serving in the Legislature, he moved into the city of New London, Wisconsin, which was his primary residence for many years.

Later, he moved west to Bismarck, North Dakota, where he died in 1936. He was survived by one daughter.

== Electoral history ==
=== Wisconsin Assembly (1896, 1898, 1900) ===
Wisconsin Assembly, Waupaca 2nd District Election, 1896
Party	Candidate	Votes	%	±%
General Election, November 3, 1896
Republican	Andrew Jensen	2,332	74.67%	−3.46%
Democratic	G. Sullivan	791	25.33%	+9.84%
Plurality		1,541	49.34%	+19.98%
Total votes		3,123	100.0%	-3.82%
Republican hold				

Wisconsin Assembly, Waupaca 2nd District Election, 1898
Party	Candidate	Votes	%	±%
General Election, November 8, 1898
Republican	Andrew Jensen (incumbent)	1,383	72.90%	−1.77%
Democratic	Charles Rice	514	27.10%	
Plurality		869	45.81%	-3.53%
Total votes		1,897	100.0%	-39.26%
Republican hold				

Wisconsin Assembly, Waupaca 2nd District Election, 1900
Party	Candidate	Votes	%	±%
General Election, November 6, 1900
Republican	Andrew Jensen (incumbent)	2,245	72.87%	−0.04%
Democratic	John Hoffman	836	27.13%	
Plurality		1,409	45.73%	-0.08%
Total votes		3,081	100.0%	+62.41%
Republican hold				

Wisconsin State Assembly
Preceded by Philip A. Ham	Member of the Wisconsin State Assembly from the Waupaca 2nd district January 4, 1897 – January 5, 1903	Succeeded by George E. Beedle
