= Charles F. Morris =

American politician

Charles F. Morris (February 12, 1876, in Chippewa Falls, Wisconsin – June 25, 1951) was a member of the Wisconsin State Assembly.

In 1899, he moved to Iron River, Wisconsin. He was a member of the Catholic Order of Foresters.

== Career ==
Morris was a Republican member of the Assembly during the 1903 session. He was also Iron River's City Attorney.

In 1904, he was elected District Attorney of Bayfield County, Wisconsin, and after losing a reelection bid in 1908 by less than thirty votes, was returned to the office in 1912, thereafter serving several terms.

== Personal life and death ==
Morris married Alice Gross of in September 1903, with whom he had three daughters and five sons who were alive at the time of his death. He died in a hospital in Hastings, Minnesota, at the age of 75, and was transported to Washburn, Wisconsin, for burial.
