= David Hodgins =

American politician

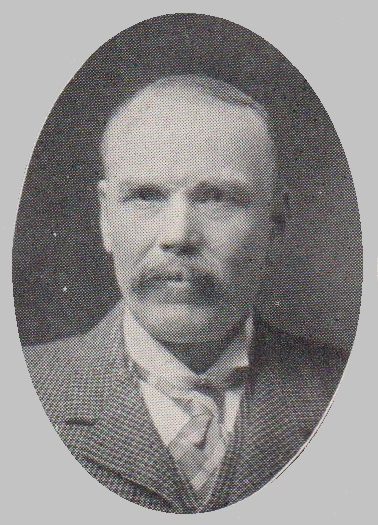
David Hodgins's portrait from the 1903 edition of the Wisconsin Blue Book.

David Hodgins (1850–1930) was a former Republican member of the Wisconsin State Assembly.

Hodgins was born on December 30, 1850. He was educated in Canada and came to Hortonville, Wisconsin in 1865. He worked as a farmer and served four terms as supervisor of Hortonville.

He was elected to the Wisconsin State Assembly in 1900 and served multiple terms.

He died on May 6, 1930.
