= Fred M. Wilcox (Wisconsin politician) =

American politician

Fred M. Wilcox (July 17, 1870 – January 13, 1944) was an American lawyer, public official, and politician.

Born in Marshall County, Iowa, Wilcox graduated from Montour High School in Montour, Iowa in 1887. He then graduated from Iowa State University in 1893. In 1894, Wilcox practiced law in Seymour, Wisconsin and then in Appleton, Wisconsin. Wilcox served as district attorney for Outagamie County, Wisconsin from 1896 to 1904 and was a Republican. Wilcox served in the Wisconsin State Senate from 1905 to 1909. In 1913, Wisconsin Governor Francis McGovern appointed Wilcox to the Wisconsin Industrial Commission; Wilcox served on the commission until 1934 and was chairman of the industrial commission. In 1936, Wilcox was appointed director of the Social Security Administration office in Minneapolis, Minnesota serving until his death in 1944. Wilcox died from a heart attack, that he had while at work, at his home in Minneapolis, Minnesota.
