= Edward Racek =

American businessman and politician

Edward Racek (October 11, 1846 – January 23, 1912) was an American businessman and politician.

Born in Polná, Bohemia, Austrian Empire, Razek emigrated with his parents to the United States in 1851 and settled in Watertown, Wisconsin in 1853. He worked in a dry goods store and a teller in the Wisconsin National Bank of Wisconsin in Watertown. Razek also was involved in the quarry business. Racek served on the Watertown Common Council and then as mayor of Watertown in 1895 and 1896, He was a Democrat. In 1904, Racek served in the Wisconsin State Assembly and declined reelection. Racek died of a heart attack at his home in Watertown, Wisconsin.
