= P. H. Peterson =

American politician

Peter Helmer Peterson (1856–1931) was a member of the Wisconsin State Assembly. He was elected to the Assembly in 1904. Other positions he held include Chairman (similar to Mayor) and Assessor of St. Lawrence, Wisconsin. Peterson was born in St. Lawrence on April 29, 1856. He married Anna Serena Myhre (1862–1947). Peterson died November 9, 1931, and is interred at Scandinavia, Wisconsin, near St. Lawrence.
