= Simon Thoreson =

American politician

Simon Thoreson (May 29, 1849 – March 20, 1918) was a merchant, businessman and an elected official. He served as a member of the Wisconsin State Assembly.

== Biography ==
Simon Thoreson was born in Norway in 1849. He moved with his parents as a child to Polk County, Wisconsin in 1862.

== Career ==
In 1876, Thoreson moved to Grantsburg, Wisconsin where he operated a general store and formed a partnership under the firm name of Oleson & Thoreson. Thoreson served as an officer of the First Bank of Grantsburg. He also held an interest in the Hickerson Roller Mill at Grantsburg, the Burnett County Abstract Company and the Grantsburg Starch Factory.

Thoreson was elected to the Assembly in 1902, where he served on the committee for privileges and elections. Previously, he had served as Director of the Grantsburg School Board, Chairman of the Burnett County, Wisconsin Republican Committee and Chairman of the Burnett County Board.
