= W. L. Oltman =

American politician

William L. Oltman (November 6, 1866 – May 28, 1956) was a member of the Wisconsin State Assembly.

== Biography ==
Oltman was born in Germany. He later resided in Diamond Bluff, Wisconsin, where he became a farmer.

== Political career ==
Oltman was a member of the Assembly during the 1905 session. Additionally, he was Chairman (similar to Mayor) of Diamond Bluff and Supervisor of Assessments of Pierce County, Wisconsin. He was a Republican.
