= B. S. Potter =

American politician (1836–1908)

Barnabas S. Potter
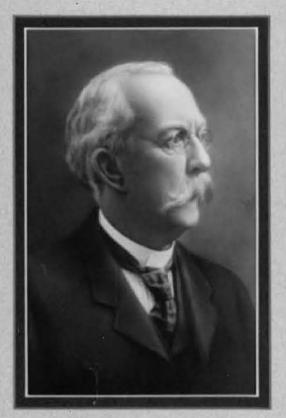

3rd Mayor of West Bend
- In office 1887 – November 30th, 1887
- Preceded by: Henry Lemke
- Succeeded by: Patrick O'Meara

Assemblyman Of Wisconsin State Senate Washington
- In office January 14, 1903 – July 16th, 1907
- Preceded by: P. G. Duerrwaechter
- Succeeded by: Henry V. Schwalbach

Personal details
- Born: Barnabas Potter; February 3, 1836 Elba, New York, U.S.
- Died: September 23, 1908 West Bend, Wisconsin

Barnabas S. Potter (February 3, 1836 – September 23, 1908) was a member of the Wisconsin State Assembly, and Mayor of West Bend, Wisconsin

== Biography ==
Potter was born on February 3, 1836, in Elba, New York, the son of Jonathan Potter and Julia Anna Potter. He moved to West Bend, Wisconsin in 1856. He married Hermina S. Bourgeois in 1868. He died of kidney and liver trouble at his home in West Bend in 1908.

== Career ==
Potter was elected to the Assembly in 1902. He was a Democrat. Potter became mayor of West Bend in 1887 following the election in spring. Later in the year, during the monthly board meeting on November 30th, Potter announced his immediate resignation, stating his inability to work in harmony with the board over the "water-power question".
