= Charles Barker (legislator) =

American politician

Charles Barker was an American politician. He was a Republican member of the Wisconsin State Assembly during the 1901 to 1903 sessions. A native of Milwaukee, Wisconsin, Barker represented the 12th District of Milwaukee County, Wisconsin.
