= George J. Kern =

American politician

George J. Kern (1850–1918) was a member of the Wisconsin State Assembly.

== Biography ==
Kern was born on April 6, 1850, in Herman, Dodge County, Wisconsin. In 1868, he moved to Sullivan, Wisconsin.

== Career ==
Kern was elected to the Assembly in 1900 and was re-elected in 1902. Additionally, he served as Assessor and Supervisor of Sullivan and a member of the Jefferson County, Wisconsin Board. He was Democrat.
