= George P. Stevens =

American politician

George P. Stevens (July 5, 1851 – 1927) was a member of the Wisconsin State Assembly.

== Biography ==
Stevens was born on July 5, 1851, in Washington County, Wisconsin. In 1856, he moved with his parents to Monroe County, Wisconsin.

== Career ==
Stevens was elected to the Assembly in 1902. Additionally, he served as Treasurer of Monroe County and a member of the Monroe County Board. He was a Republican.
