= J. E. Coffland =

American politician

J. E. Coffland (February 12, 1864, in Ohio – June 10, 1929), was a member of the Wisconsin State Assembly. He established a clothing and furnishing goods business in Richland Center, Wisconsin.

== Political career ==
Coffland was a member of the Assembly during the 1903 and 1905 sessions. Previously, he had been elected as a member of the county board of Richland County, Wisconsin in 1895 and as Mayor of Richland Center in 1902 and 1904. He was a Democrat.
