= Richard E. Tarrell =

American politician

Richard Edward Tarrell (May 5, 1856 – July 8, 1942) was a member of the Wisconsin State Assembly.

== Biography ==
Tarrell was born on May 5, 1856, in Paris, Grant County, Wisconsin. In 1878, he moved to Elk Grove, Wisconsin.

== Career ==
Tarrell was elected to the Assembly in 1902. Previously, he had served as a member of the Elk Grove Board of Supervisors, Treasurer of Elk Grove, Chairman of the Board of Elk Grove and Sheriff of Lafayette County, Wisconsin. He was a Republican.
