= Frank A. Cady =

American lawyer and politician (1858–1904)

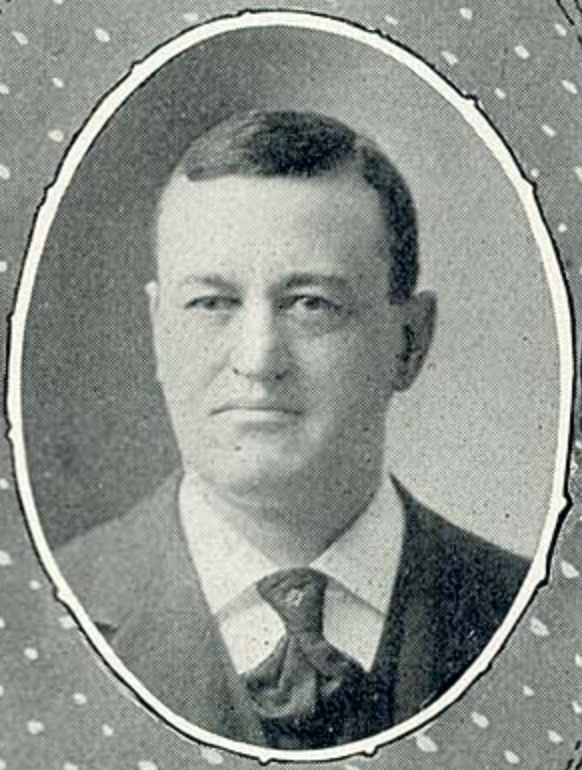
Frank Cady, Wisconsin businessman and legislator

Frank A. Cady (December 31, 1858 – March 30, 1904) was an American lawyer, real estate dealer and politician from Marshfield, Wisconsin who served as a Republican member of the Wisconsin State Assembly, representing Wood County from 1901 to 1904.

Born in Newport, Wisconsin, Cady was educated in the public schools in Kilbourn City, Wisconsin (now called Wisconsin Dells). In 1883, Cady received his law degree from University of Wisconsin Law School and then practiced law in Marshfield, Wisconsin and then Wisconsin Rapids, Wisconsin. He killed himself by jumping from a third-floor veranda in Hot Springs, Arkansas, where he had gone because of his health.
