= Fred J. Carpenter =

American politician

Fred J. Carpenter (born September 21, 1871, date of death unknown) was a member of the Wisconsin State Assembly.

== Biography ==
Carpenter was born on September 21, 1871 in Plover, Wisconsin. He graduated from the University of Wisconsin Law School. During the Spanish–American War, Carpenter served as a first lieutenant in the United States Army.

== Political career ==
Carpenter was elected to the Assembly in 1902, 1904 and 1906. Additionally, he served as City Attorney and a member of the School Board of Stevens Point, Wisconsin. He was a Republican.
