= Winfield S. Braddock =

American politician

Winfield S. Braddock (August 23, 1848 – June 1920) was a member of the Wisconsin State Assembly.

== Biography ==
Braddock was born on August 23, 1848, in Philadelphia, Pennsylvania. He attended Yale College before eventually working as a law clerk in Saint Paul, Minnesota. In 1888, he moved to Jackson County, Wisconsin, where he was a cranberry grower. Braddock died in Philadelphia and was buried in Tomah, Wisconsin.

== Political career ==
Braddock was a member of the Assembly during the 1903 and 1905 sessions. Additionally, he was a member of the Jackson County board of supervisors. He was a Republican.
