= Thomas Johnson (Wisconsin politician) =

American politician

Thomas Johnson (March 16, 1854 – January 26, 1933) was a member of the Wisconsin State Assembly.

== Biography ==
Johnson was born in Norway on March 16, 1854. He moved with his parents to La Crosse County, Wisconsin in 1859. Johnson became a farmer, creamery company president and insurance company secretary.

A Lutheran, Johnson married Maria P. Hanson (1860–1950) on February 18, 1882. They had seven children. Johnson died on January 26, 1933.

== Political career ==
Johnson was elected to the Assembly in 1902 and 1904. In addition, he was chairman (similar to mayor), assessor and clerk of the school board of Holland, La Crosse County, Wisconsin and chairman of the La Crosse County board of supervisors. He was a Republican.
