= Joseph P. Chandler =

American politician

Joseph P. Chandler (August 22, 1840 – August 24, 1910) was a member of the Wisconsin State Assembly.

== Biography ==
Chandler was born on August 22, 1840, in Monticello, Missouri. He moved to Wisconsin in 1847, settling in Montfort, Wisconsin.

== Career ==
Chandler was elected to the Assembly in 1902 and chaired the Public Improvements Committee. Additionally, he served as Assessor of Montfort, Chairman of the Grant County, Wisconsin Board of Supervisors and a member of the Grant County, Wisconsin Board. He was a Republican.
