= Ernst Merton =

American lawyer and politician

Ernst Merton (August 9, 1848 – December 24, 1920) was an American lawyer and politician.

Born in Prussia, Germany, Merton emigrated with his parents to the United States settling in Illinois and then Milwaukee, Wisconsin. Merton worked on a farm and then worked in a sewing machine factory. Merton studied law and was admitted to the Wisconsin bar in 1878. Merton practiced law in Burlington, Wisconsin. From 1880 to 1889, Merton served as the first president of the village of Burlington. In 1889, he moved to Waukesha, Wisconsin and continued to practice law. He served on the Waukesha Common Council, served as school commissioner, and on the school board in Waukesha. From 1903 to 1907, Merton served in the Wisconsin State Senate as a Democrat. Merton died in East Troy, Wisconsin.
