= Fred B. Breitwisch =

American politician

Fred B. Breitwisch was an American politician. He was a member of the Wisconsin State Assembly.

== Biography ==
Breitwisch was born on January 11, 1867, in Milwaukee, Wisconsin.

== Career ==
Breitwisch was elected to the Assembly in 1902. He was a Republican.

== See also ==
- The Political Graveyard
