= Warren L. Root =

American politician

Warren L. Root was a member of the Wisconsin State Assembly.

== Biography ==
Root was born on March 4, 1837, in Jefferson County, New York. He later moved to Outagamie County, Wisconsin.

== Career ==
Root was elected to the Assembly in 1902. Previously, he had served as a town treasurer from 1864 to 1868. He was a Republican.
