= Frederick Hartung =

American politician

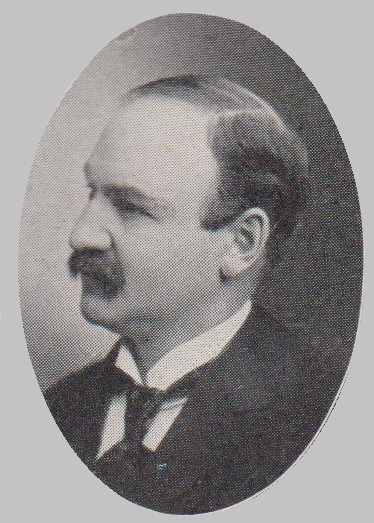
Frederick Hartung's portrait from the 1903 edition of the Wisconsin Blue Book.

Frederick Hartung (born 1857), was a Republican member of the Wisconsin State Assembly.

Hartung was born in Wauwatosa, Wisconsin on July 30, 1857. He received his education from the Wauwatosa public schools, and the German-English Academy of Milwaukee. He was a farmer, and was treasurer of the town of Wauwatosa for the year 1888. He was also elected assessor for Wauwatosa from 1893 to 1895, and served as chairman of the local board of supervisors starting in 1896.

He was elected to the Wisconsin State Assembly in 1898, and served several terms.
