= William Campbell North =

American politician (1859–1924)

William C. North
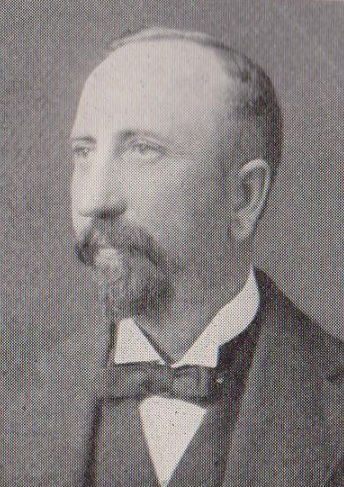

Member of the Wisconsin Senate from the 13th district
- In office 1903–1906

Personal details
- Born: June 21, 1859 Dodge County, Wisconsin, US
- Died: November 2, 1924 (aged 65)
- Party: Democratic
- Profession: Attorney, Politician

William Campbell North (June 21, 1859 – November 2, 1924) was a member of the Wisconsin Legislature.

== Biography ==
He was born in Dodge County, Wisconsin on June 21, 1859. He studied law in the office of Hon. Charles Allen of Horicon. He was admitted to the bar in 1880 and opened a law firm in Chillicothe, Missouri. After three years, he returned to Dodge County and opened an office in Fox Lake.

He was first elected to the Wisconsin Senate in 1902, beating M.P. Elkinton (Rep) and B.F. Sawyer (Pro).

He died on November 2, 1924.
