= Zadoc P. Beach =

American politician

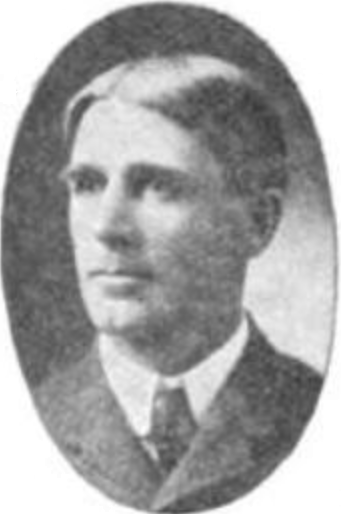

Wisconsin State Senator of the 23rd District
- In office 1903–1906
- Preceded by: John H. Harris
- Succeeded by: John Adam Hazelwood

Personal details
- Born: January 21, 1861 Whitewater, Wisconsin
- Died: After 1948
- Party: Republican
- Spouse: Bertha Schuster

Zadoc P. Beach (January 21, 1861 – After 1948) was an American politician. He was a member of the Wisconsin State Senate.

== Biography ==
Beach was born on January 21, 1861, in Whitewater, Wisconsin. His professional pursuits would include cold storage, creamery and produce businesses.

He was married to Mrs. Bertha Schuster (1859-1948), a daughter of Germanic immigrants.

Following his career, he retired in Gilroy, California and then settled in Duluth, Minnesota. He had a brother, Dr. Charles Lewis Beach.

== Political career ==
Beach was member of the Senate from 1903 to 1905 representing the 23rd District. Previously, he had been a Whitewater alderman from 1888 to 1894 and Mayor of Whitewater from 1895 to 1896. He was a Republican.
