= James Dinsdale =

American politician

James Dinsdale (November 18, 1848 – December 28, 1928) was a member of the Wisconsin State Assembly.

== Political career ==
Dinsdale was born in Askrigg, Richmondshire District, North Yorkshire, United Kingdom and died in Madison, Wisconsin at the age of 80. He was buried in Forest Hill Cemetery Soldiers Grove, Crawford County, Wisconsin. He was elected to the Assembly in 1902. Previously, he had been chairman of the Board of Crawford County, Wisconsin, and president of Soldiers Grove. He was a Republican.
