= Robert A. Lang =

American politician

Robert A. Lang was an American politician. He was a Republican member of the Wisconsin State Assembly during the 1903 session. Lang represented the 1st District of Eau Claire County, Wisconsin.
