= John E. Norton =

American politician

John E. Norton was a Republican member of the Wisconsin State Assembly during the 1901 session. A native of Milwaukee, he represented the 15th District of Milwaukee County, Wisconsin.
