= Joseph Martin Crowley =

American politician

Joseph Martin Crowley was a member of the Wisconsin State Assembly.

== Biography ==
Crowley was born on April 29, 1871, in Milwaukee, Wisconsin.

== Career ==
Crowley was elected to the Assembly in 1902. He was Democrat.
