= Andrew L. Kreutzer =

American politician from Wisconsin (1862–1944)

Andrew Lawrence Kreutzer (August 30, 1862 – March 27, 1944) was an American politician, a member of the Wisconsin State Senate.

== Biography ==
Kreutzer was born in Germantown, Wisconsin in 1862. He graduated from the University of Wisconsin Law School and began practicing law. In 1895, he was appointed by Governor William H. Upham to attend the Atlanta Exposition Speech. From 1897 to 1898, he was Judge Advocate General of the Wisconsin Army National Guard, achieving the rank of colonel. He died in 1944.

== Political career ==
Kreutzer was a member of the Senate from 1899 to 1905. Previously, he served two terms as District Attorney of Marathon County, Wisconsin. He was a Republican. Kreutzer declared his candidacy as Republican nominee for governor of Wisconsin in 1924, but was forced by illness to withdraw from the race.
