= Wallace W. Andrew =

American businessman and politician

Wallace Andrew

Member of the Wisconsin State Assembly
- In office 1901; 1905

Personal details
- Born: December 25, 1850 Sheboygan County, Wisconsin
- Died: January 18, 1919 (aged 69) Superior, Wisconsin
- Party: Republican

Wallace W. Andrew (December 25, 1850 – January 18, 1919) was an American businessman and politician.

== Biography ==
Born in Sheboygan County, Wisconsin, Andrew and his parents moved to Oregon, Wisconsin. Andrew was involved with the grain and livestock businesses. In 1894, Andrew moved with his brothers to Superior, Wisconsin and established the Deluxe Manufacturing Company. Andrew served in the Wisconsin State Assembly in 1901 and 1905 as a Republican.

At the time of his death in 1919, Andrew was serving on the Douglas County Board of Supervisors and was chairman of the county board. Andrew died at his home in Superior, Wisconsin.
