= Lynn N. Coapman =

American businessman and politician (1860–1943)

Lynn Norman Coapman (September 12, 1860 – March 5, 1943) was an American businessman and politician.

Born in the town of Wyocena, Columbia County, Wisconsin, Coapman was a grain and food produce dealer. He was also a telegraph operator, station agent, and was in the mercantile business. Coapman served as Wyocena town board chairman and on the Columbia County Board of Supervisors. In 1901, Coapman served in the Wisconsin State Assembly and was a Republican. Coapman was cashier at the Kilbourn State Bank in Wisconsin Dells, Wisconsin where he had lived for many years. He died at his home in Wisconsin Dells, Wisconsin.
