= Beaver, Clark County, Wisconsin =

Beaver, Wisconsin
- Town
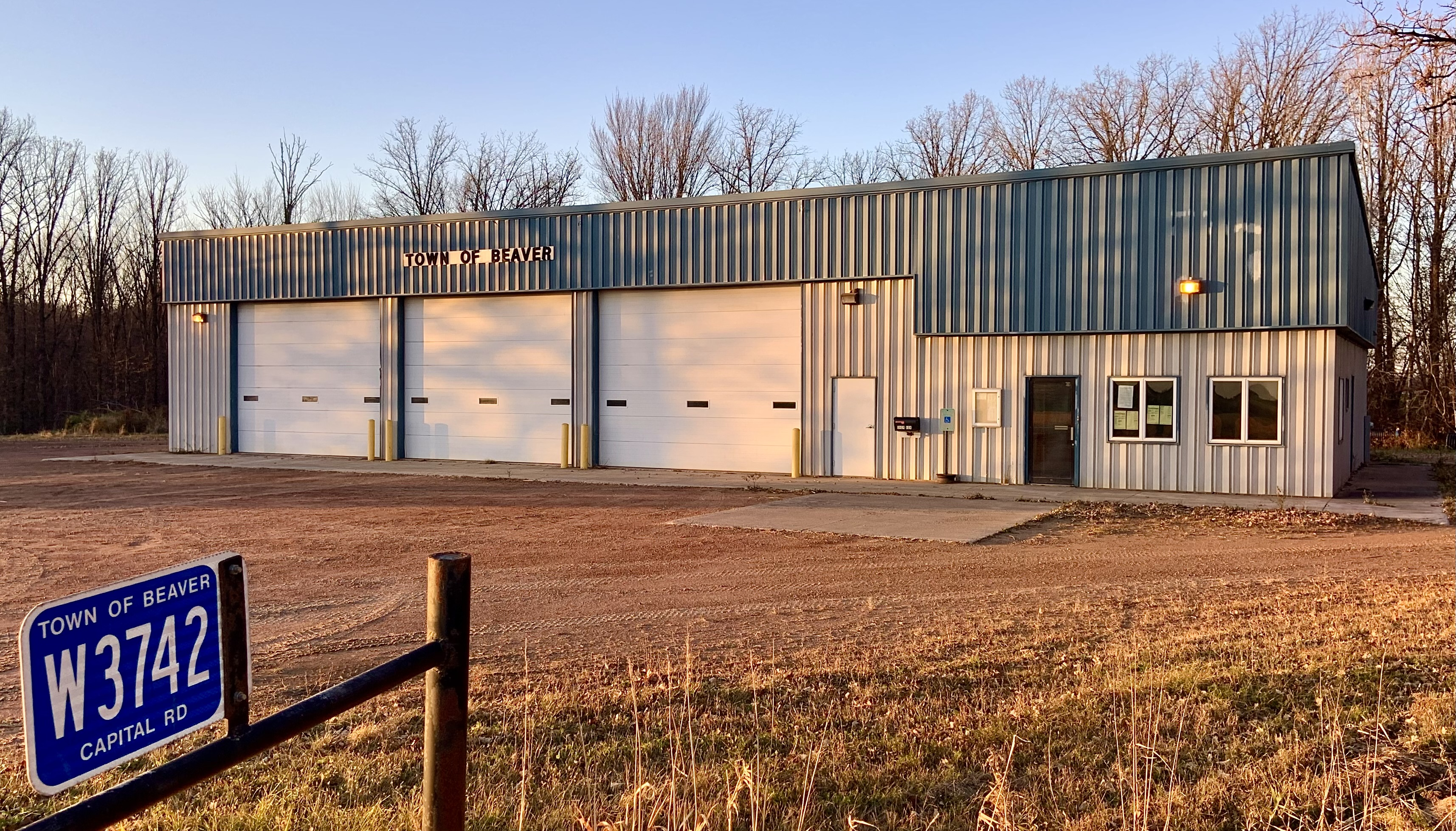
- Town hall

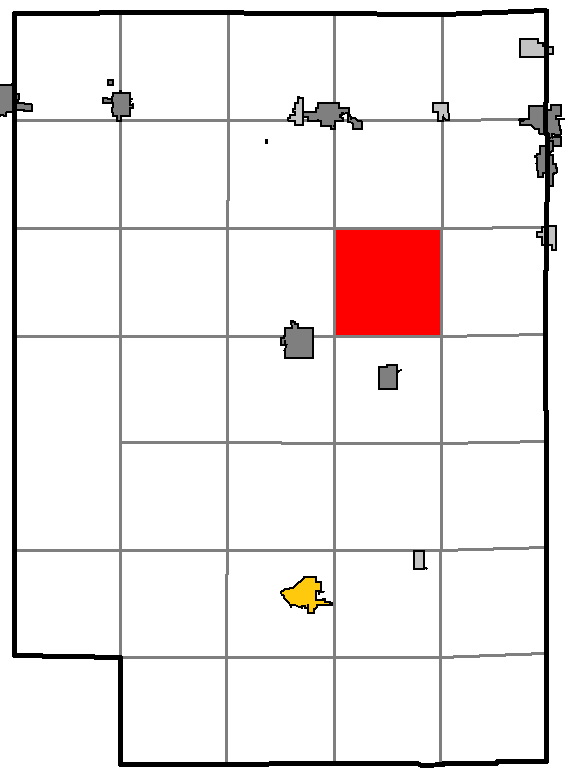
- Location of Beaver, Clark County

- Location of Clark County, Wisconsin
- Coordinates: 44°49′2″N 90°30′9″W
- Country: United States
- State: Wisconsin
- County: Clark

Area
  - Total: 36.1 sq mi (93.5 km^{2})
  - Land: 36.0 sq mi (93.2 km^{2})
  - Water: 0.12 sq mi (0.3 km^{2})
- Elevation: 1,240 ft (378 m)

Population (2020)
  - Total: 826
  - Density: 23.0/sq mi (8.86/km^{2})
- Time zone: UTC-6 (Central (CST))
  - Summer (DST): UTC-5 (CDT)
- Area codes: 715 & 534
- FIPS code: 55-05750
- GNIS feature ID: 1582773
- Website: https://townofbeaverwi.com/

Beaver is a town in Clark County in the U.S. state of Wisconsin. The population was 826 at the 2020 census.

== Geography ==
According to the United States Census Bureau, the town has a total area of 36.1 square miles (93.5 km^{2}), of which 36.0 square miles (93.2 km^{2}) is land and 0.1 square miles (0.3 km^{2}), or 0.30%, is water.

== Demographics ==
At the 2000 census, there were 854 people, 238 households and 207 families residing in the town. The population density was 23.7 per square mile (9.1/km^{2}). There were 249 housing units at an average density of 6.9 per square mile (2.7/km^{2}). The racial makeup of the town was 98.95% White, 0.12% Asian, 0.23% from other races, and 0.70% from two or more races. Hispanic or Latino of any race were 0.35% of the population.

There were 238 households, of which 52.1% had children under the age of 18 living with them, 77.3% were married couples living together, 3.8% had a female householder with no husband present, and 13.0% were non-families. 9.2% of all households were made up of individuals, and 1.3% had someone living alone who was 65 years of age or older. The average household size was 3.59 and the average family size was 3.89.

40.7% of the population were under the age of 18, 8.8% from 18 to 24, 28.2% from 25 to 44, 15.3% from 45 to 64, and 6.9% who were 65 years of age or older. The median age was 26 years. For every 100 females, there were 124.1 males. For every 100 females age 18 and over, there were 121.9 males.

The median household income was $41,458 and the median family income was $45,208. Males had a median income of $28,182 compared with $19,286 for females. The per capita income for the town was $13,692. About 11.7% of families and 18.7% of the population were below the poverty line, including 29.8% of those under age 18 and none of those age 65 or over.

== Notable people ==
- Phillip Rossman, Wisconsin State Representative, farmer, and lumberman, lived on a farm in the town; Rossman served as chairman of the Beaver Town Board
