= George Rankl =

American politician

George Rankl (February 28, 1867 – ?) was an American politician from Milwaukee. He was a member of the Wisconsin State Assembly.

== Career ==
Rankl was elected to the Assembly in 1902. He was a Republican.
