= James J. McGillivray =

American politician

James J. McGillivray (June 16, 1848 – 1925) was a member of the Wisconsin State Assembly and the Wisconsin State Senate.

== Biography ==
McGillivray was born on June 16, 1848, in Canada East. He moved to Black River Falls, Wisconsin, in 1866.

== Career ==
McGillivray represented the 31s District in the Senate during the 1895 through 1905 sessions. Eventually, he was chosen as its president pro tem. Previously, he had been a member of the Assembly during the 1891 and 1893 sessions. McGillivray was a Republican.
