= Wisconsin Blue Book =

Biennial publication

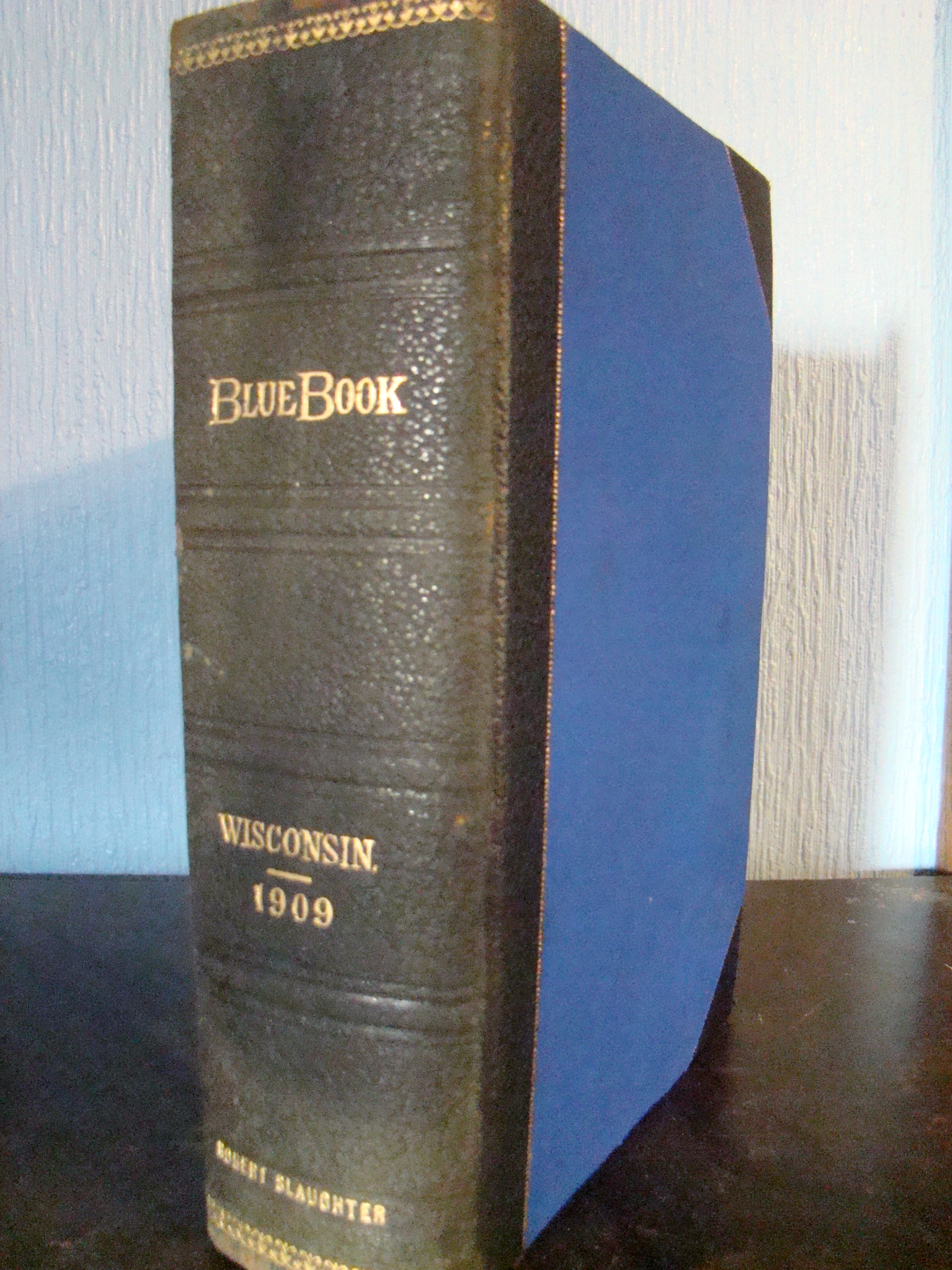
The 1909 edition of the Wisconsin Blue Book

The Wisconsin Blue Book is a biennial publication of the Wisconsin's Legislative Reference Bureau. The Blue Book is an almanac containing information on the government, economics, demographics, geography and history of the state of Wisconsin. It was published annually from 1879 to 1883, and then biennially since 1885 to the present day. It is currently published in the fall of every odd-numbered year, corresponding to the start of each new biennium of the Wisconsin state government. Since 1995, the Blue Book has been available free in electronic form.

Many editions also provide a special article of substantial length, focusing on either a natural feature or some social aspect about the state.

Hardcover editions of the book may be obtained for no cost at the Wisconsin State Capitol or by Wisconsin residents by contacting their State Representative or State Senator. It can also be ordered from the Wisconsin Department of Administration's "Document Sales and Distribution Unit".
