= Samuel Decius Hubbard =

American politician (1833–1910)

Samuel D. Hubbard

Member of the Wisconsin State Assembly from the Buffalo district
- In office January 5, 1885 – January 3, 1887
- Preceded by: John Tester
- Succeeded by: Joseph Vernon Jones

Member of the Wisconsin State Assembly from the Sheboygan 2nd district
- In office January 1, 1877 – January 7, 1878
- Preceded by: William Noll
- Succeeded by: J. L. Shepard
- In office January 5, 1874 – January 3, 1875
- Preceded by: Otto Puhlman
- Succeeded by: Patrick Geraghty

Member of the Wisconsin State Assembly from the Sheboygan 3rd district
- In office January 6, 1862 – August 1862
- Preceded by: Cadwaller W. Humphrey
- Succeeded by: Henry Hayes

Personal details
- Born: September 23, 1833 Paris, New York, U.S.
- Died: June 14, 1910 (aged 76)
- Resting place: Oak Park Cemetery, Mondovi, Wisconsin
- Party: Republican; Liberal Republican (1874); Natl. Union (1862)
- Spouse: Electa Jane Robinson (m. 1861; died 1888)
- Children: Marion L. Hubbard^{(b. 1865; died 1940)}; Ara Jay Hubbard^{(b. 1872; died 1954)}; at least 1 daughter

Military service
- Allegiance: United States
- Branch/service: United States Army; Union Army
- Years of service: 1862–1864
- Rank: Captain, USV
- Unit: 27th Reg. Wis. Vol. Infantry
- Battles/wars: American Civil War: Vicksburg campaign; Little Rock campaign

Samuel Decius Hubbard (September 23, 1833 – June 14, 1910) was an American farmer, livestock dealer, and politician who served four discontinuous terms over three decades as a member of the Wisconsin State Assembly. He also served as a Union Army officer during the American Civil War.

== Background ==
Hubbard was born in Paris, in Oneida County, New York on September 23, 1833. He received an academic education and attended Hamilton College. and became a member of the Delta Kappa Epsilon fraternity; at that time his residence was in Sauquoit. He became a farmer by trade. Hubbard came to Wisconsin in 1859, and initially settled in Scott in Sheboygan County.

== In Wisconsin; Assembly and Civil War ==
In years to come Hubbard held various local offices and was a member and chairman of various town and county boards for a number of years. On June 11, 1861 he married Electa Jane Robinson. He was first elected to the Assembly for the 3rd Sheboygan County district (now reduced after a redistricting to the Towns of Abbott, Holland, Mitchell and Scott) in 1861, as a "Union Independent", succeeding Republican William F. Mitchell; and was assigned to the standing committee on enrolled bills.

He enlisted as a private in the 27th Wisconsin Volunteer Infantry Regiment on August 11, 1862 (after the legislative session ended), and was commissioned as a captain on September 1; his Assembly seat was taken by Democrat Henry Hayes. Hubbard participated in the sieges of Vicksburg and Little Rock before being assigned to recruiting service in December 1863; he was discharged in April, 1864. In 1868 he moved to Lyndon, and took up dealing in livestock as well as farming.

== Return to civilian life ==
He was elected to the Assembly in 1873 from the 2nd Sheboygan County district (Towns of Greenbush, Lyndon, Mitchell, Plymouth, Rhine and Russell) as a candidate of the Reform Party (a short-lived coalition of Democrats, reform and Liberal Republicans, and Grangers formed in 1873, which secured the election of a Governor of Wisconsin and a number of state legislators) with 766 votes to 571 for regular Republican S. D. Putnam. He was assigned to the committees on incorporations and legislative expenditures, chairing the latter. He was not a candidate for re-election, and was succeeded by fellow Reform Party candidate Patrick Geraghty.

Hubbard served as a deputy warden at the state prison in 1874. In 1876, serving as chairman of his county board of supervisors, Hubbard was elected once again to the Assembly in 1876 as a Liberal Republican, with 1,254 votes to 1,104 for Republican incumbent Nathaniel Farnsworth; he was assigned to the committee on federal relations. By this time, he listed himself simply as a "farmer" with no mention of dealing in livestock.

He moved to Mondovi in Buffalo County in 1878, and was elected a fourth time to the Assembly in 1884 for Buffalo County as a Republican, with 1,604 votes to 1,177 for Democratic former Assemblyman George Cowie. (Republican incumbent John Tester was not a candidate.) He was not a candidate for re-election in 1886, and was succeeded by Republican Joseph Vernon Jones.

As of October 1, 1907, he was still listed as an active member of Delta Kappa Epsilon. He was an active member of the Knights of Pythias fraternal order, eventually serving as Grand Chancellor of that organization's Wisconsin body in 1888-1889. He died June 14, 1910; his grave is in Oak Park Cemetery in Mondovi.

Wisconsin State Assembly
Preceded by Cadwaller W. Humphrey	Member of the Wisconsin State Assembly from the Sheboygan 3rd district January 6, 1862 – August 1862	Succeeded by Henry Hayes
Preceded by Otto Puhlman	Member of the Wisconsin State Assembly from the Sheboygan 2nd district January 5, 1874 – January 3, 1875	Succeeded by Patrick Geraghty
Preceded by William Noll	Member of the Wisconsin State Assembly from the Sheboygan 2nd district January 1, 1877 – January 7, 1878	Succeeded by J. L. Shepard
Preceded by John Tester	Member of the Wisconsin State Assembly from the Buffalo district January 5, 1885 – January 3, 1887	Succeeded by Joseph Vernon Jones
