= George W. Wolff =

American politician (1848–1919)

George W. Wolff (April 7, 1848–April 1, 1919) was a member of the Wisconsin State Assembly (1895–1897) and the Wisconsin State Senate (1901–1907).

== Biography ==
Wolff was born on April 7, 1848, in Rhine, Wisconsin. Julius Wolff, his father, was also a member of the Assembly. He attended high school in Sheboygan, Wisconsin, and what is now Lawrence University. By trade, Wolff was a farmer. In addition, he was a member of the Independent Order of Odd Fellows.

In 1890, Wolff married Helen K. Bettelhauser. They had two daughters. Wolff eventually settled in Elkhart Lake, Wisconsin, where he died on April 1, 1919. He was buried in Franklin, Sheboygan County, Wisconsin.

== Political career ==
Wolff served two terms in the Assembly before serving in the Senate from 1901 to 1909. Additionally, he was Chairman (similar to Mayor) of Rhine from 1896 to 1906 and a member of the Sheboygan County, Wisconsin Board of Supervisors from 1886 to 1906, serving as chairman from 1895 to 1904. He was a Republican.
