= Rhine (disambiguation) =

The Rhine is a river in Europe.

Rhine may also refer to:

== People ==
- Abraham B. Rhine (1877–1941), Lithuanian-American rabbi
- Joseph Banks Rhine (1895–1980), a parapsychologist
- Ron Rhine (1937–2024), American politician in Ohio

== Places ==
=== United States ===
- Rhine, Georgia, a town
- Rhine, Wisconsin, a town
- Rhine Center, Wisconsin, an unincorporated community
- Rhine Creek (West Virginia), a stream in West Virginia

=== Australia ===
- Somme Creek (South Australia), formerly North Rhine, an Australian place names changed from German
- Marne River (South Australia), formerly South Rhine
- Cambrai, South Australia, formerly Rhine Villa

== Other ==
- Confederation of the Rhine, a country from 1806–13
- The Rhine, an 1842 travelogue by Victor Hugo
- Rhine, a merchant ship
- Local spelling of rhyne, a drainage ditch or canal used to turn areas of wetland at around sea level into useful pasture
- Rhine or Rijn, the name given to one of the planes destroyed in the 1977 Tenerife Airport Disaster

== See also ==
- Rhine provinces
- Rhene, a spider genus
- Rhene (mythology)
- Rhines (disambiguation)
- The Rhin, a tributary river of the river Havel in Brandenburg
