= Patrick Geraghty =

American politician

Patrick Geraghty (February 4, 1843 - ?) was an American farmer and schoolteacher from Elkhart Lake, Wisconsin, who spent a single one-year term as a member of the Wisconsin State Assembly from Sheboygan County.

== Background ==
Geraghty was born in Westport, County Mayo, Ireland, on February 4, 1843. He moved with his parents to Canada, later to Vermont and in 1849 to Sheboygan Falls, Wisconsin, and finally from there to the town of Rhine in 1851, where they settled. He received a common and high school education, and became a farmer and schoolteacher.

== Public office ==
Geraghty was elected justice of the peace in 1866, and again in 1874; and was also clerk of his school district for three terms. He was elected to the second Sheboygan County Assembly district ( the Towns of Greenbush, Lyndon, Mitchell, Plymouth, Rhine and Russell) as a candidate of the Reform Party (a short-lived coalition of Democrats, reform and Liberal Republicans, and Grangers formed in 1873, which secured the election of a Governor of Wisconsin and a number of state legislators) in 1874, with 850 votes, to 781 for Republican N. C. Harmon, succeeding fellow Reformer Samuel D. Hubbard. He was assigned to the standing committee on education.

He was not a candidate for re-election in 1875, and was succeeded by Republican William Noll.
