= Joseph Martin (Wisconsin politician) =

American judge (1878–1946)

The Honorable Joseph F. Martin
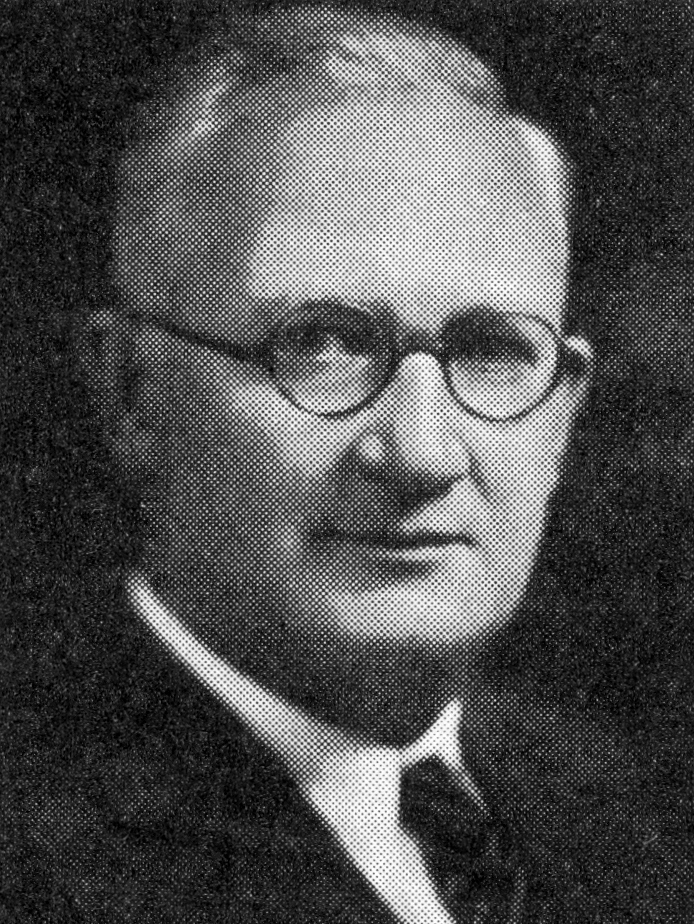
- Martin circa 1940

Justice of the Wisconsin Supreme Court
- In office January 1, 1935 – March 19, 1946
- Appointed by: Albert G. Schmedeman
- Preceded by: Theodore G. Lewis
- Succeeded by: James Ward Rector

Chair of the Democratic Party of Wisconsin
- In office December 16, 1933 – December 1934
- Preceded by: Otto A. La Budde
- Succeeded by: James A. Corcoran
- In office September 1914 – May 12, 1916
- Preceded by: Joseph E. Davies
- Succeeded by: Otto A. La Budde

Member of the Wisconsin State Assembly from the Brown 2nd district
- In office January 5, 1903 – January 2, 1905
- Preceded by: Michael J. Flaherty
- Succeeded by: Maurice B. Brennan

Personal details
- Born: Joseph Francis Martin; May 12, 1878 Rockland, Wisconsin, U.S.
- Died: March 19, 1946 (aged 67) Green Bay, Wisconsin, U.S.
- Resting place: Allouez Catholic Cemetery and Chapel Mausoleum; Green Bay, Wisconsin
- Party: Democratic
- Spouse: Mildred Eleanor Wright
- Children: Mildred (Delaney); Jean (Lefebvre); Florence; 1 other daughter (died young)
- Parents: Edward Martin (father); Bridget (Farrell) Martin (mother)
- Relatives: Patrick Henry Martin (brother); John F. Martin (brother); John E. Martin (nephew)
- Education: University of Wisconsin–Madison; Notre Dame Law School

Joseph Francis Martin (May 12, 1878 – March 19, 1946) was an American lawyer, jurist, and Democratic politician from Green Bay, Wisconsin. He served 11 years as a justice of the Wisconsin Supreme Court, from 1935 until his death in 1946. He previously served one term in the Wisconsin State Assembly, representing Brown County during the 1903–1904 session, and served as chairman of the Democratic Party of Wisconsin in the 1910s and 1930s.

His nephew and law partner, John E. Martin, would go on to serve as the 16th chief justice of the Wisconsin Supreme Court.

== Biography ==
Martin was born in Rockland, Wisconsin, one of ten children of Edward and Bridget Martin. He graduated from West De Pere High School in 1897.

== Career ==
Martin studied law at a law firm run by John Wigman and his holder brother, Patrick H. Martin, and at the University of Wisconsin, though he never graduated. He was admitted to the bar in 1903. He was active in civic affairs and was a member of the local school board. Martin served one term in the Wisconsin State Assembly after winning election in 1902. At age 24, he was the youngest person to have served in the Assembly at that time.

After the Assembly, he returned to law practice with his brothers John F. Martin and Patrick, and later with his nephew, John E. Martin, who would later go on to become Chief Justice of the Wisconsin Supreme Court. He would serve on the Brown County Board of Education, and was President of the board at the time he was appointed to the Supreme Court. He was also chairman of the Democratic Party of Wisconsin.

He was appointed a justice of the Wisconsin State Supreme Court on December 31, 1934, by Governor Albert G. Schmedeman, who was a close friend. He would win election to a full ten-year term on the court in 1937, soundly defeating attorneys Glenn P. Turner and Fred M. Wylie. He remained on the court until his death in 1946.

He was a member of the Democratic National Committee, the Knights of Columbus, the Benevolent and Protective Order of Elks, and the Lions Clubs International.

== Personal life and family ==
Joseph Martin was the 9th of at least 10 children born to Edward Martin (1836–1914) and his wife Bridgette (née Farrell; 1842–1916). His parents were Irish American immigrants who had arrived in Wisconsin in the 1850s, and were pioneers of the town of Rockland in Brown County.

Joseph Martin married Mildred Eleanor Wright on October 5, 1904. They resided in Green Bay and had four daughters, three of whom survived to adulthood.

He died of a heart attack in Green Bay on March 19, 1946.

Party political offices
| Preceded by Joseph E. Davies | Chair of the Democratic Party of Wisconsin; September 1914 – May 12, 1916 | Succeeded by Otto A. La Budde |
| Preceded by Otto A. La Budde | Chair of the Democratic Party of Wisconsin; December 15, 1933 – December 1934 | Succeeded by James A. Corcoran |
Political offices
| Preceded by Michael J. Flaherty | Member of the Wisconsin State Assembly from the Brown 2nd district 1903 – 1905 | Succeeded by Maurice B. Brennan |
Legal offices
| Preceded by Theodore G. Lewis | Justice of the Wisconsin Supreme Court; 1935 – 1946 | Succeeded by James Ward Rector |
