= Ada, Wisconsin =

- Unincorporated community
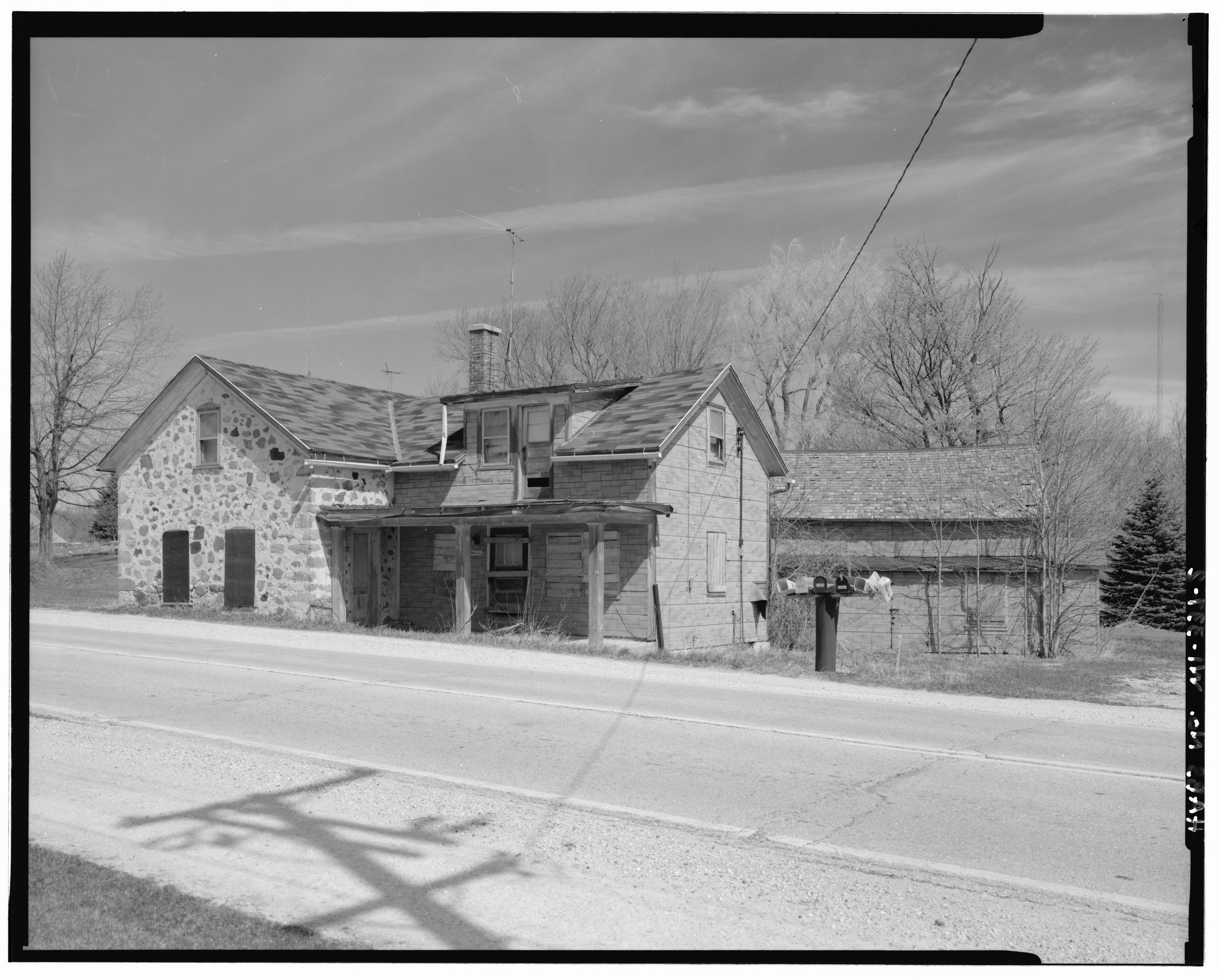
- Cobbler Shop 1933

- Location within Wisconsin Location within the United States
- Coordinates: 43°52′37″N 87°53′44″W
- Country: United States
- State: Wisconsin
- County: Sheboygan
- Elevation: 892 ft (272 m)
- Time zone: UTC-6 (Central (CST))
  - Summer (DST): UTC-5 (CDT)
- Area code: 920
- GNIS feature ID: 1560679

Ada is an unincorporated community in the town of Herman, Sheboygan County, Wisconsin, United States.

== Description ==
The community is located on Wisconsin Highway 32, 4.8 miles (7.7 km) northwest of Howards Grove.
