= Howards Grove, Wisconsin =

- Village
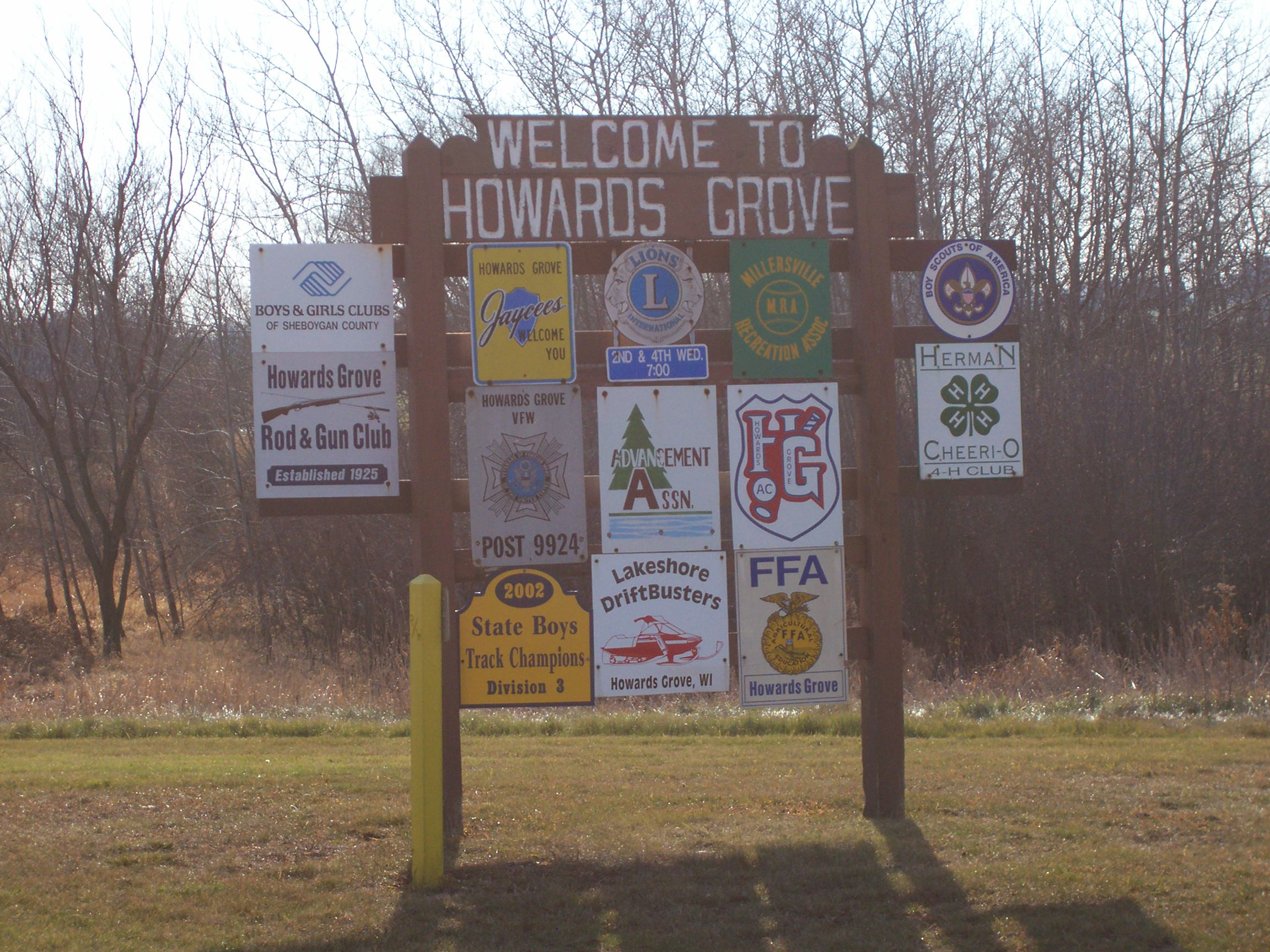

- Location of Howards Grove in Sheboygan County, Wisconsin.
- Coordinates: 43°49′47″N 87°49′24″W
- Country: United States
- State: Wisconsin
- County: Sheboygan

Area
  - Total: 2.25 sq mi (5.83 km^{2})
  - Land: 2.22 sq mi (5.76 km^{2})
  - Water: 0.027 sq mi (0.07 km^{2})
- Elevation: 712 ft (217 m)

Population (2020)
  - Total: 3,237
  - Density: 1,470.5/sq mi (567.78/km^{2})
- Time zone: UTC-6 (Central (CST))
  - Summer (DST): UTC-5 (CDT)
- ZIP code: 53083
- Area code: 920
- FIPS code: 55-36025
- GNIS feature ID: 1566769
- Website: https://www.howardsgrovewi.gov/

Howards Grove is a village in Sheboygan County, Wisconsin, United States. The population was 3,237 at the 2020 census. It is part of the Sheboygan, Wisconsin Metropolitan Statistical Area.

== History ==
The village was named after H. B. Howard, a hotelier and postmaster. Howards Grove began as two unincorporated communities: Millersville and Howards Grove. They united as one village in 1967, forming the longest municipality name in the state (Howards Grove–Millersville), before it was shortened to Howards Grove by referendum in 1972. In the year 1846, the first immigrants started to make an appearance and settled in the surrounding wilderness which was named the town of Herman. Sheboygan, which was ten miles from where they had settled, was their main source of supplies. The main occupation of this area since the 1840s has been farming. The farming community had always had a focus on growing oats and wheat but as early as November 29, 1899, the Sheboygan Telegram noted that there had been a change in operation. The focus was changed to dairy farming. Today, farming still rules the community.

== Geography ==
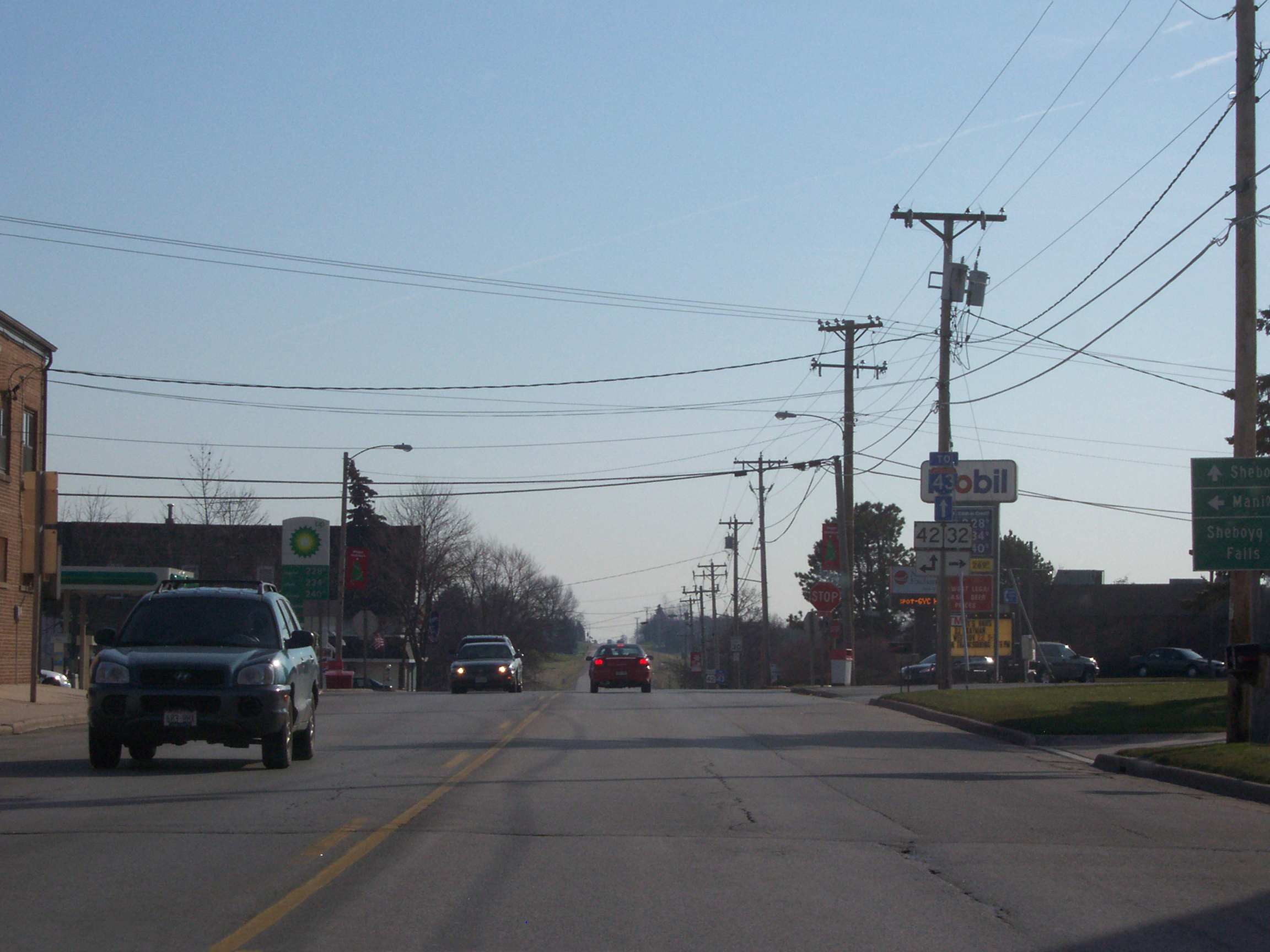
Intersection of Wisconsin Highway 32 and 42

According to the United States Census Bureau, the village has a total area of 2.34 square miles (6.06 km^{2}), of which 2.31 square miles (5.98 km^{2}) is land and 0.03 square miles (0.08 km^{2}) is water.

== Demographics ==
Historical population
Census	Pop.	Note	%±
1970	998		—
1980	1,838		84.2%
1990	2,329		26.7%
2000	2,792		19.9%
2010	3,188		14.2%
2020	3,237		1.5%
U.S. Decennial Census

As of 2000, the median income for a household in the village was $59,032, and the median income for a family was $65,243. Males had a median income of $42,444 versus $26,719 for females. The per capita income for the village was $21,913. About 2.1% of families and 2.8% of the population were below the poverty line, including 2.2% of those under age 18 and 12.3% of those age 65 or over.

=== 2010 census ===
As of the census of 2010, there were 3,188 people, 1,245 households, and 942 families residing in the village. The population density was 1,380.1 inhabitants per square mile (532.9/km^{2}). There were 1,276 housing units at an average density of 552.4 per square mile (213.3/km^{2}). The racial makeup of the village was 98.3% White, 0.4% African American, 0.1% Native American, 0.6% Asian, 0.2% from other races, and 0.5% from two or more races. Hispanic or Latino of any race were 0.9% of the population.

There were 1,245 households, of which 34.6% had children under the age of 18 living with them, 66.0% were married couples living together, 5.8% had a female householder with no husband present, 3.9% had a male householder with no wife present, and 24.3% were non-families. 19.8% of all households were made up of individuals, and 9.5% had someone living alone who was 65 years of age or older. The average household size was 2.56 and the average family size was 2.94.

The median age in the village was 41.2 years. 25.3% of residents were under the age of 18; 6% were between the ages of 18 and 24; 24.7% were from 25 to 44; 32.2% were from 45 to 64; and 12% were 65 years of age or older. The gender makeup of the village was 50.5% male and 49.5% female.

== Education ==
The Howards Grove School District serves students in grades K-12. The district includes all of the Village of Howards Grove, the Town of Herman, half of the Town of Mosel, and parts of the Towns of Rhine, Sheboygan Falls, and Meeme. The district's three schools are all located in Howards Grove: one elementary school, one middle school, and one high school. Approximately 130 staff serve the almost 1,000 students in the three schools. The district has an open enrollment policy where students outside the district can choose to attend a Howards Grove school without paying tuition.

Northview Elementary School is located on the north end of the village. Howards Grove High School is located in the mid-east part of town, as well as Howards Grove Middle School, which used to be in the northern part of town until the end of the 2024 school year, which the building went for sale and the school moved into the high school building in 2025. At the beginning of the 2009-2010 school year, the high school had its gymnasium re-done after a rain storm ruined the floors. The school has a track and football complex outside the school. There are also tennis courts, baseball and softball fields, a soccer field, and a football practice field on the school grounds.

St. Paul's Lutheran School is a Pre-K-8 grade school of the Wisconsin Evangelical Lutheran Synod in Howards Grove.

== Notable people ==
- Henry Bodenstab, attorney and Wisconsin State Senator, born here
- Julius Bodenstab, member of the Wisconsin State Assembly, father of Henry
- Curt W. Janke, member of the Wisconsin State Assembly, born here
- August Meyers, members of the Wisconsin State Assembly, lived here
- Otto C. Neumeister, member of the Wisconsin State Assembly, born here
- Kayla Vandre, won over $100,000 on Wheel of Fortune in 2023
