= Otto A. La Budde =

American politician (1865-1940)

Chair of the Democratic Party of Wisconsin
- In office October 29, 1927 – December 16, 1933
- Preceded by: John M. Callahan
- Succeeded by: Joseph F. Martin
- In office May 12, 1916 – January 22, 1919
- Preceded by: Joseph F. Martin
- Succeeded by: John P. Hume

Member of the Wisconsin State Assembly from the Sheboygan 2nd district
- In office January 2, 1911 – January 6, 1913
- Preceded by: Edward J. Keyes
- Succeeded by: Henry Ott

Personal details
- Born: June 11, 1865 Rhine, Wisconsin, U.S.
- Died: October 14, 1940 (aged 75) Milwaukee, Wisconsin, U.S.
- Resting place: Wisconsin Memorial Park, Brookfield, Wisconsin
- Party: Democratic
- Spouse: Anna Freutel (m. 1888–1940)
- Children: Walter William La Budde^{(b. 1889; died 1967)}; Arthur Ferdnand La Budde^{(b. 1892; died 1961)}; Raymond E. La Budde^{(b. 1897; died 1986)}

Otto A. La Budde (June 11, 1865 – October 14, 1940) was an American businessman and Democratic politician from Sheboygan County, Wisconsin. He served 8 years as chairman of the Democratic Party of Wisconsin, from 1916 through 1918, and from 1927 to 1933. He also served one term in the Wisconsin State Assembly, representing Sheboygan County during the 1911–1912 term, and served as village president of Elkhart Lake, Wisconsin.

== Biography ==
Born in the town of Rhine, in Sheboygan County, Wisconsin, La Budde went to Plymouth High School in Plymouth, Wisconsin. He then worked in a hardware store in Plymouth, Wisconsin. In 1884, La Budde owned and worked in a retail hardware store in the village of Elkhart Lake, Wisconsin.

La Budde was a Democrat and served as president of the village of Elkhart Lake, Wisconsin. In 1911, La Budde served in the Wisconsin State Assembly. After his term in the Assembly, he served his first stint as chairman of the Democratic Party of Wisconsin.

In 1919, President Woodrow Wilson appointed La Budde customs collector for the Port of Milwaukee, Wisconsin. Afterwards, he was again elected chairman of the Democratic Party of Wisconsin. He resigned as chairman in 1933, after U.S. President Franklin Roosevelt appointed him collector of internal revenue for Wisconsin.

La Budde died in a hospital in Milwaukee after an abdominal operation on September 16, 1940.

Party political offices
Preceded by Joseph F. Martin	Chair of the Democratic Party of Wisconsin; May 12, 1916 – January 22, 1919	Succeeded by John P. Hume
Preceded by John M. Callahan	Chair of the Democratic Party of Wisconsin; October 29, 1927 – December 16, 1933	Succeeded by Joseph F. Martin
Wisconsin State Assembly
Preceded by Edward J. Keyes	Member of the Wisconsin State Assembly from the Sheboygan 2nd district January 2, 1911 – January 6, 1913	Succeeded by Henry Ott
