= Julius Wolff (politician) =

American politician (1818–1879)

Julius Wolff (April 19, 1818–March 22, 1879) was a member of the Wisconsin State Assembly.

== Biography ==
Wolff was born on April 19, 1818. He died on March 22, 1879, and would be buried in Franklin, Sheboygan County, Wisconsin.

His son, George W. Wolff, would become a member of the Assembly and the Wisconsin State Senate.

== Career ==
Wolff represented the 4th District of Sheboygan County, Wisconsin in the Assembly during the 1866 session. He was affiliated with the National Union Party.
