= Morrison, Wisconsin =

- Town
- Location in Brown County and the state of Wisconsin.
- Coordinates: 44°16′57″N 87°56′55″W
- Country: United States
- State: Wisconsin
- County: Brown

Area
  - Total: 36.43 sq mi (94.35 km^{2})
  - Land: 36.30 sq mi (94.01 km^{2})
  - Water: 0.14 sq mi (0.35 km^{2})
- Elevation: 846 ft (258 m)

Population (2020)
  - Total: 1,689
  - Density: 46.53/sq mi (17.97/km^{2})
- Time zone: UTC-6 (Central (CST))
  - Summer (DST): UTC-5 (CDT)
- Area code: 920
- FIPS code: 55-54300
- GNIS feature ID: 1583753
- Website: www.townofmorrison.org

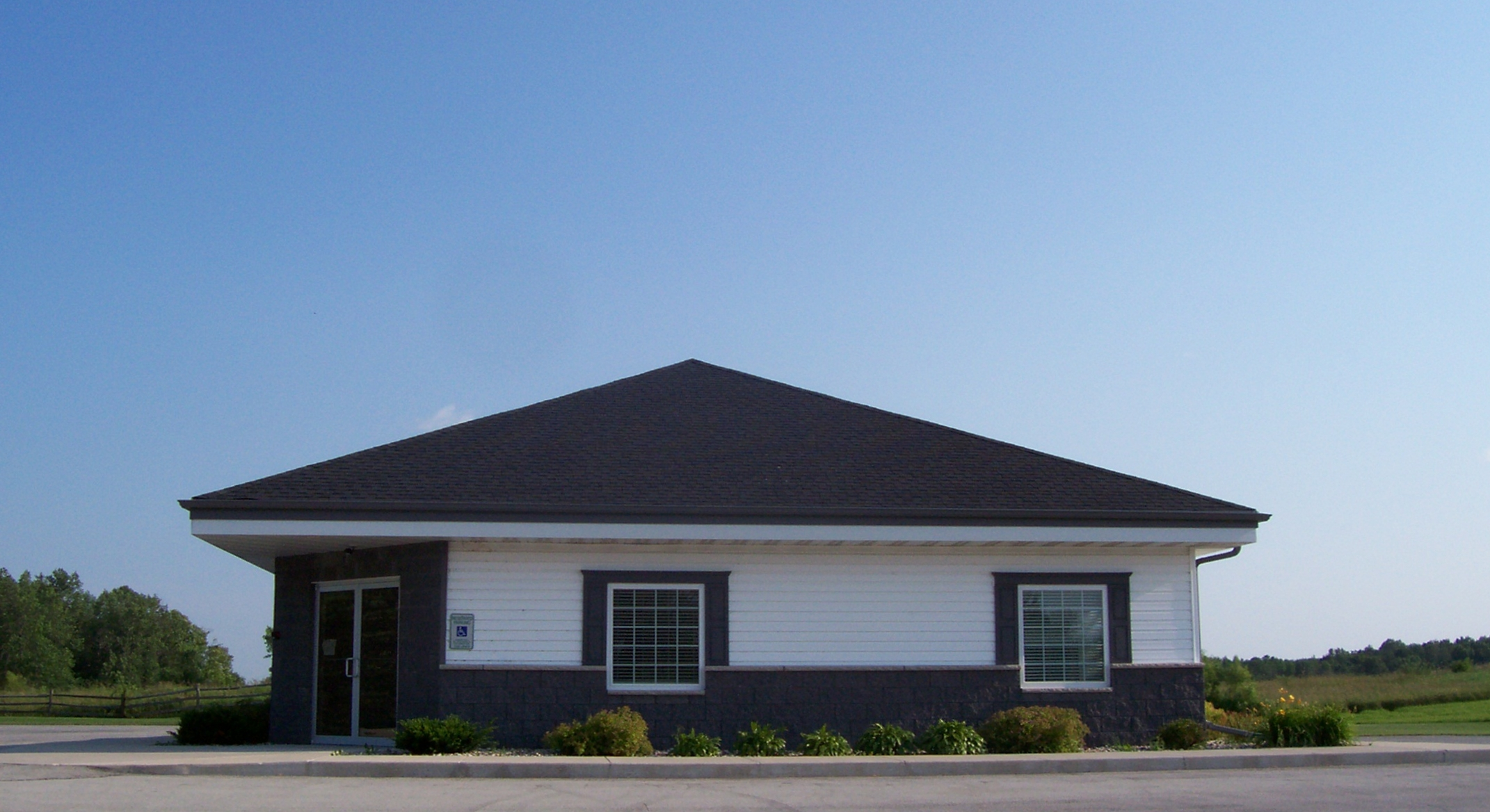
Old town hall

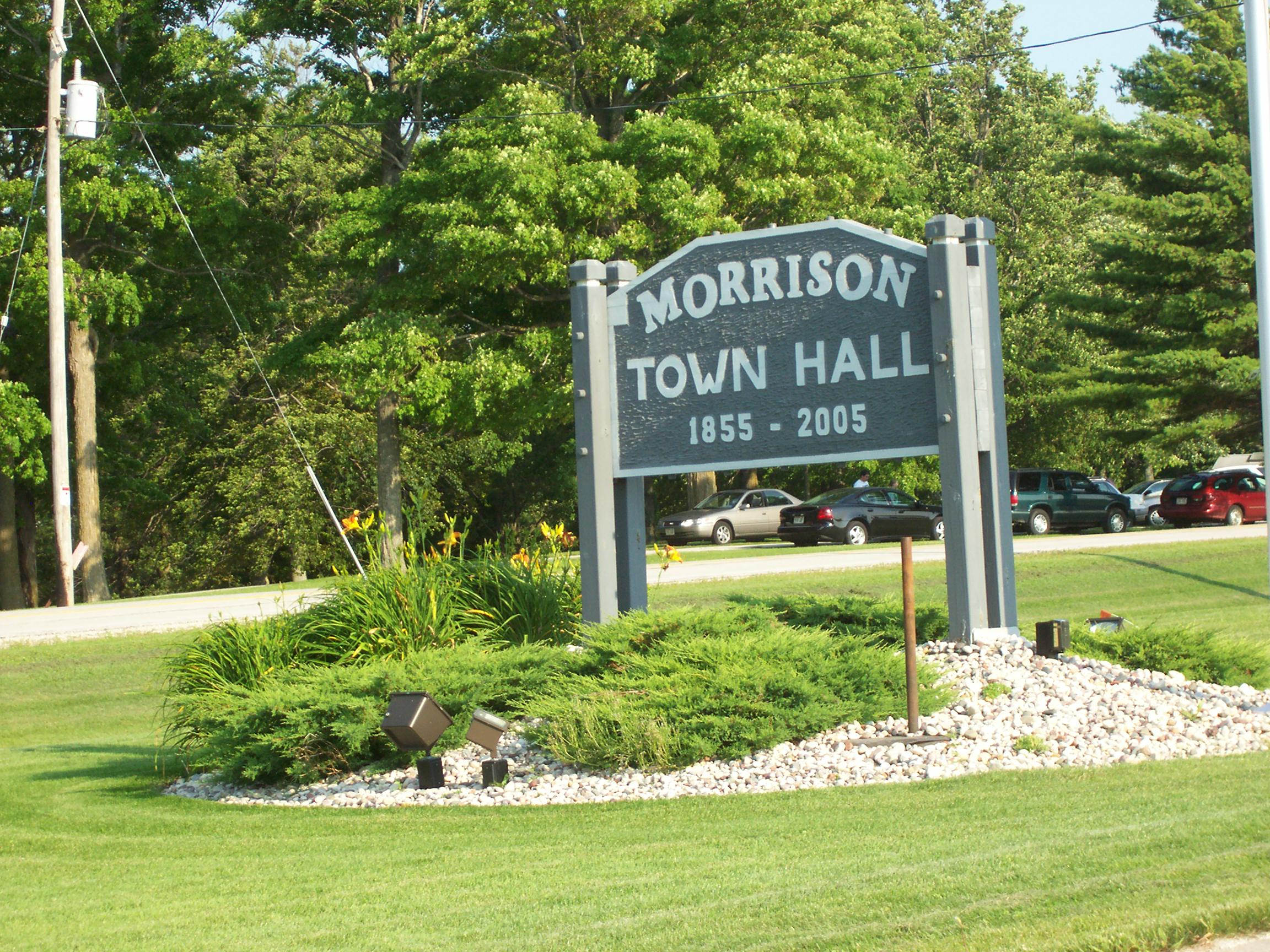
Sign for the old town hall

Morrison is a town in Brown County in the U.S. state of Wisconsin. The population was 1,689 at the 2020 census.

== Communities ==
- Lark is an unincorporated community located at the intersection of WIS 96 and Dickinson Road.
- Morrison is an unincorporated community located at the intersection of County Road W, Mill and Morrison Roads.
- Wayside is an unincorporated community located at the intersection of County Road W and Wayside Road.

== Geography ==
Morrison is located in southern Brown County and is bounded by Manitowoc County to the south and the east. According to the United States Census Bureau, the town has a total area of 36.43 square miles (94.35 km^{2}), of which 36.30 square miles (94.01 km^{2}) is land and 0.14 square miles (0.35 km^{2}), or 0.37%, is water.

== Demographics ==
As of the census of 2000, there were 1,651 people, 564 households, and 457 families residing in the town. The population density was 47.1 people per square mile (18.2/km^{2}). There were 579 housing units at an average density of 16.5 per square mile (6.4/km^{2}). The racial makeup of the town was 98.36% White, 0.24% African American, 0.12% Native American, 0.12% Asian, 0.61% from other races, and 0.55% from two or more races. Hispanic or Latino of any race were 0.91% of the population.

There were 564 households, out of which 38.5% had children under the age of 18 living with them, 73.0% were married couples living together, 4.6% had a female householder with no husband present, and 18.8% were non-families. 14.4% of all households were made up of individuals, and 6.0% had someone living alone who was 65 years of age or older. The average household size was 2.93 and the average family size was 3.24.

In the town, the population was spread out, with 29.0% under the age of 18, 7.5% from 18 to 24, 30.0% from 25 to 44, 23.3% from 45 to 64, and 10.2% who were 65 years of age or older. The median age was 35 years. For every 100 females, there were 103.3 males. For every 100 females age 18 and over, there were 107.1 males.

The median income for a household in the town was $55,461, and the median income for a family was $59,013. Males had a median income of $36,776 versus $23,571 for females. The per capita income for the town was $19,841. About 4.6% of families and 6.2% of the population were below the poverty line, including 8.6% of those under age 18 and 3.0% of those age 65 or over.

== Notable people ==
- Maurice B. Brennan, Wisconsin State Representative
- Michael J. Flaherty, Wisconsin State Representative
- Michael J. Touhey, Wisconsin State Representative
