= Philip H. Kasper =

American cheesemaker

Philip H. ("P.H.") Kasper (1866–1942) was an American businessman and cheesemaker who earned the title "World's Greatest Cheesemaker" on account of the numerous awards his cheese earned in competitions around the United States and internationally.

P.H. Kasper was born in Sheboygan County, Wisconsin and grew up in a farm community in the town of Rhine. He learned cheese making at the age of eighteen. After working in cheese factories for seven years, he purchased the Nicholson Cheese Factory in Bear Creek, Waupaca County, Wisconsin, in 1891. Two years later, in 1893, Kasper won a trophy and diploma for his cheese at the World Columbian Exposition in Chicago. In 1894, Kasper attended the Dairy School at the University of Wisconsin’s College of Agriculture, in Madison, graduating with highest honors.

During the 1890s, Kasper helped organize the Wisconsin Cheesemakers Association. Eventually, he served as the Vice President of that association in 1918, and its President in 1929 and 1930.

During his long career, Kasper's cheese won him over 200 awards, gold medals and other prizes. These included the Grand Prix at the Paris Exposition in 1900, and the title "Greatest Cheesemaker in the World" at the International Dairy Show in Chicago in 1912. In 1928, by appointment of the United States Government, Kasper was a delegate to the World's Dairy Congress held in London, England.

In 1941, Kasper was honored by Joint Resolution of the Legislature of the State of Wisconsin as "world's champion cheesemaker."
