= Franklin Feed Mill =

- U.S. National Register of Historic Places
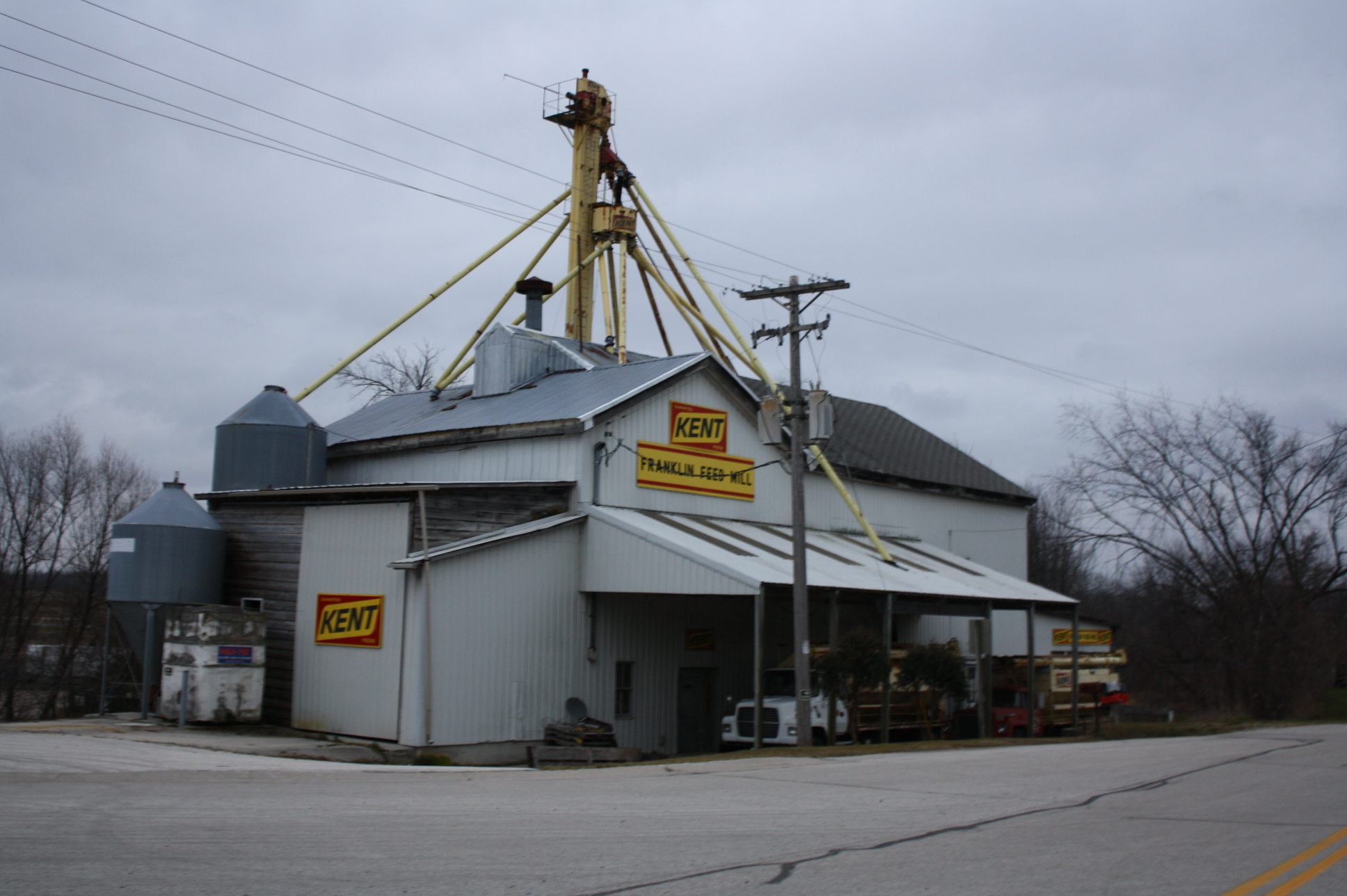
- Franklin Feed Mill

- Location within Wisconsin
- Location: Franklin Rd., Franklin, Sheboygan County, Wisconsin
- Coordinates: 43°50′07″N 87°54′09″W
- Area: less than one acre
- Built: 1856
- Architect: Conrad Arpke/Harry Dickoff
- MPS: 19th Century Grist and Flouring Mills of Sheboygan County TR
- NRHP reference No.: 85000792
- Added to NRHP: April 11, 1985

The Franklin Feed Mill is located in Franklin, Sheboygan County, Wisconsin. It was listed on the National Register of Historic Places in 1985 and on the State Register of Historic Places in 1989.
