= 1936 Wisconsin Supreme Court election =

- April 7, 1936
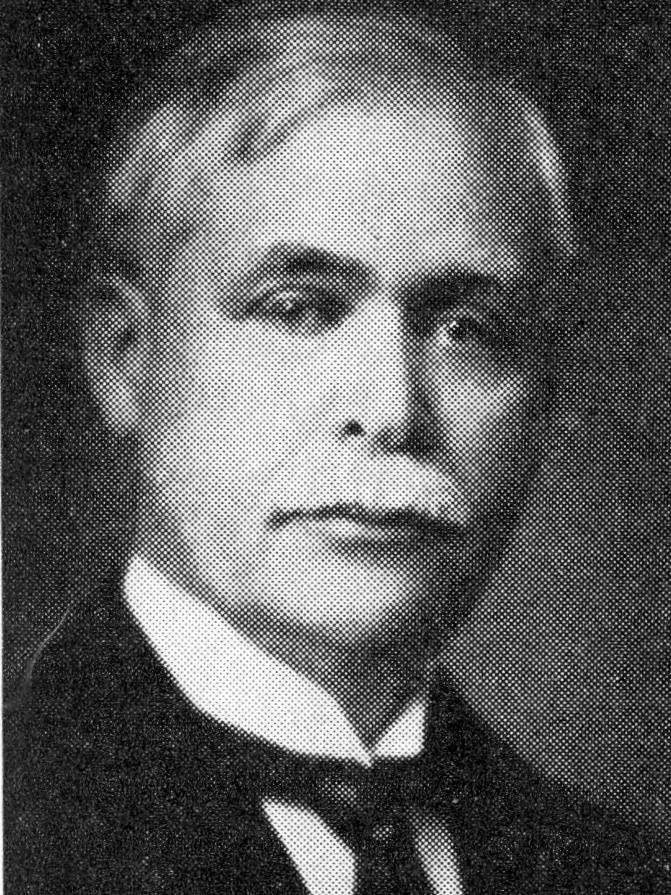

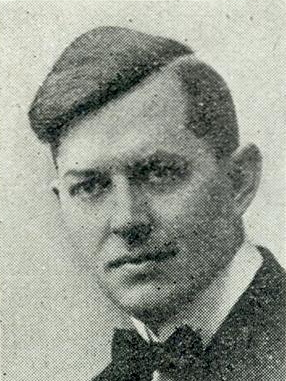
Candidate	Edward T. Fairchild	Glenn P. Turner
Popular vote	488,698	262,650
Percentage	65.04%	34.96%
Justice before election
Edward T. Fairchild
Elected Justice
Edward T. Fairchild

The 1936 Wisconsin Supreme Court election was held on Tuesday, April 7, 1936, to elect a justice to the Wisconsin Supreme Court for a ten-year term. Incumbent justice Edward T. Fairchild (who had been appointed in 1930) defeated challenger Glenn P. Turner by a large margin.

== Background ==
In 1930, Fairchild was appointed to the court by Governor Walter J. Kohler Sr. to fill a vacancy. No special election was held in the intervening years before the next regularly scheduled election.

== Candidates ==
- Edward T. Fairchild: incumbent justice (appointed in 1930)
- Glenn P. Turner: lawyer and former Socialist member of the state legislature

== Campaign ==
Governor Robert M. La Follette did not give an endorsement in the election.

Turner had launched his campaign with a pledge that as a justice he would never call into question the constitutionality of any legislative acts.

== Result ==
1936 Wisconsin Supreme Court election
Party	Candidate	Votes	%
General election (April 7, 1936)
Nonpartisan	Edward T. Fairchild (incumbent)	488,698	65.04
Nonpartisan	Glenn P. Turner	262,650	34.96
Majority		226048	30.09
Total votes		751,348	100
