= August Meyers =

American farmer, salesman and politician

August G. Meyers (January 1, 1864 – October 26, 1951) was an American farmer, salesman, and politician.

Born in the town of Herman, Sheboygan County, Wisconsin, Meyers went to Janesville College. He was a farmer, a traveling salesman, and hotel owner. He owned the "Washington House" in Howards Grove, Wisconsin and was the postmaster. Meyers served in the Wisconsin State Assembly in 1905 and was a Republican. Meyers was a Wisconsin deputy game warden and was elected county clerk for Sheboygan County. From 1911 to 1927, Meyers was the Wisconsin assistant superintendent for public property. Meyers died in a hospital in Madison, Wisconsin.
