= Theodore G. Lewis =

American judge, Justice of the Wisconsin Supreme Court

The Honorable Theodore G. Lewis

Justice of the Wisconsin Supreme Court
- In office November 15, 1934 – December 5, 1934
- Appointed by: Albert G. Schmedeman
- Preceded by: Walter C. Owen
- Succeeded by: Joseph Martin

District Attorney of Dane County
- In office January 1, 1921 – January 1, 1925
- Preceded by: Roman Heilman
- Succeeded by: Philip La Follette

Personal details
- Born: Theodore Gorman Lewis; November 19, 1890 McFarland, Wisconsin, U.S.
- Died: December 5, 1934 (aged 44) Madison, Wisconsin, U.S.
- Cause of death: Pneumonia
- Resting place: Forest Hill Cemetery; Madison, Wisconsin
- Party: Democratic
- Spouse: Mabel Davidson Inbusch
- Children: Nancy Lewis; Theodore G. Lewis, Jr.
- Education: University of Wisconsin; University of Wisconsin Law School

Military service
- Allegiance: United States
- Branch/service: United States Army
- Years of service: 1917–1919
- Rank: 1st Lieutenant
- Unit: 32nd Division
- Battles/wars: World War I
- Awards: Purple Heart

Theodore Gorman Lewis (November 19, 1890 – December 5, 1934) was an American lawyer and politician from Wisconsin. He was a justice of the Wisconsin Supreme Court for the last 20 days of his life.

== Biography ==
Born in McFarland, Wisconsin, Lewis graduated from the University of Wisconsin and received his law degree from the University of Wisconsin Law School in 1915. He served in the United States Army during World War I, was wounded at Château-Thierry, and was awarded the Purple Heart. Lewis was district attorney of Dane County, Wisconsin from 1921 to 1925. He also served as city attorney of Madison, Wisconsin from 1930 to 1933. Lewis was also executive secretary to the governor of Wisconsin. On November 15, 1934, Lewis was appointed to the Wisconsin Supreme Court only to die of pneumonia twenty days later on December 5, 1934, before he could hear a case.

Legal offices
Preceded by Roman Heilman	District Attorney of Dane County, Wisconsin; 1921 – 1925	Succeeded by Philip La Follette
Preceded by Walter C. Owen	Justice of the Wisconsin Supreme Court; 1934	Succeeded by Joseph Martin
