= Rhines =

Rhines is a surname. Notable people with the surname include:

- Billy Rhines (1869–1922), American baseball player
- Charles Rhines (1956–2019), American murderer executed in South Dakota
- Jennifer Rhines (born 1974), American long-distance runner
- Wally Rhines (born 1946), American engineer

== See also ==
- Rhine (disambiguation)
