= Michael J. Touhey =

Irish-American politician (1844–1904)

Michael J. Touhey (November 30, 1844 — March 22, 1904) was a member of the Wisconsin State Assembly.

== Biography ==
Touhey was born on November 30, 1844 in County Clare, Ireland and emigrated to the United States in 1847. His family settled in Manitowoc County, Wisconsin and, in 1868, in Brown County, Wisconsin, where Touhey was engaged in farming and took an active interest in public affairs.

Touhey was twice elected to represent his district in the Wisconsin state legislature, including in 1877. Other positions he held included member of the Town Board (similar to a city council) of Morrison, Wisconsin. Touhey was a Democrat.

Touhey died at the age of 60 on March 22, 1904 in Bessemer, Michigan, where he had been living for the previous 18 years, leaving a widow and 8 children.
