= John Tester =

Swiss American soldier and state politician (1835–1918)

John A. Tester

Member of the Wisconsin State Assembly from the Buffalo district
- In office January 1, 1883 – January 5, 1885
- Preceded by: Martin W. McDonnell
- Succeeded by: Samuel Decius Hubbard

Personal details
- Born: March 30, 1835 Rongellen, Grisons, Switzerland
- Died: May 26, 1918 (aged 83) Seattle, Washington, U.S.
- Resting place: Lake View Cemetery, Seattle
- Party: Republican
- Spouse: Mathilda F. Tester (died 1934)
- Occupation: Merchant

Military service
- Allegiance: United States
- Branch/service: United States Volunteers; Union Army
- Years of service: 1861–1862
- Rank: 1st Lieutenant, USV
- Unit: 6th Reg. Wis. Vol. Infantry
- Battles/wars: American Civil War

John A. Tester (March 30, 1835 – May 26, 1918) was a Swiss American immigrant, merchant, and Republican politician. He was a member of the Wisconsin State Assembly, representing Buffalo County in the 1883 session.

== Biography ==
Born in Rongellen, the Canton of Grisons, Switzerland, Tester moved with his parents to St. Louis, Missouri, in 1848 and then to Wisconsin in 1853. He served in the 6th Wisconsin Volunteer Infantry Regiment as first lieutenant during the American Civil War. He served as deputy county treasurer for Buffalo County, Wisconsin, and on the Buffalo County Board of Supervisors. He also served on the Alma, Wisconsin, village board as trustee and as president.

Wisconsin State Assembly
Preceded by Martin W. McDonnell	Member of the Wisconsin State Assembly from the Buffalo district January 1, 1883 – January 5, 1885	Succeeded by Samuel Decius Hubbard
