= Maurice B. Brennan =

American politician

Member of the Wisconsin State Assembly
- In office January 11, 1905 – January 9, 1907
- Preceded by: Joseph Martin
- Succeeded by: Wallace S. Hager
- Constituency: Brown 2nd district
- In office January 12, 1881 – January 11, 1882
- Preceded by: Chester G. Wilcox
- Succeeded by: Patrick Henry Moran
- Constituency: Brown 3rd district

Personal details
- Born: April 6, 1842 County Kerry, Ireland
- Died: August 7, 1927 (aged 85) Cato, Wisconsin, U.S.
- Party: Republican
- Occupation: Farmer

Maurice B. Brennan (April 6, 1842 – August 7, 1927) was an Irish American immigrant, politician and farmer.

Born in County Kerry, Ireland, Brennan emigrated with his parents to the United States in 1848, initially settling in Springfield, Massachusetts. In 1852, Brennan and his family settled in the town of Morrison, Brown County, Wisconsin. Brennan was a livestock dealer and farmer. Brennan served as assessor of the town of Morrison. In 1881 and 1905, Brennan served in the Wisconsin State Assembly as a Republican. Brennan died at the home of his daughter in Cato, Manitowoc County, Wisconsin, where he had been living.
