= William F. Sieker =

German-American politician in Wisconsin (1849–1930)

William F. Sieker (January 28, 1849 – August 28, 1930) was an American farmer and politician.

Born in Lippe-Detmold, Germany, Sieker emigrated with his parents to the United States and settled on a farm, near the unincorporated community of Franklin, in the town of Herman, Sheboygan County, Wisconsin. Sieker was a farmer and would teach school during the winter. He served as Herman Town Clerk and as Herman Town Board Chairman. Sieker served in the Wisconsin State Assembly in 1895 and 1897 and was a Republican. Sieker died at his home near Franklin.
