= Rhine Center, Wisconsin =

- Unincorporated community
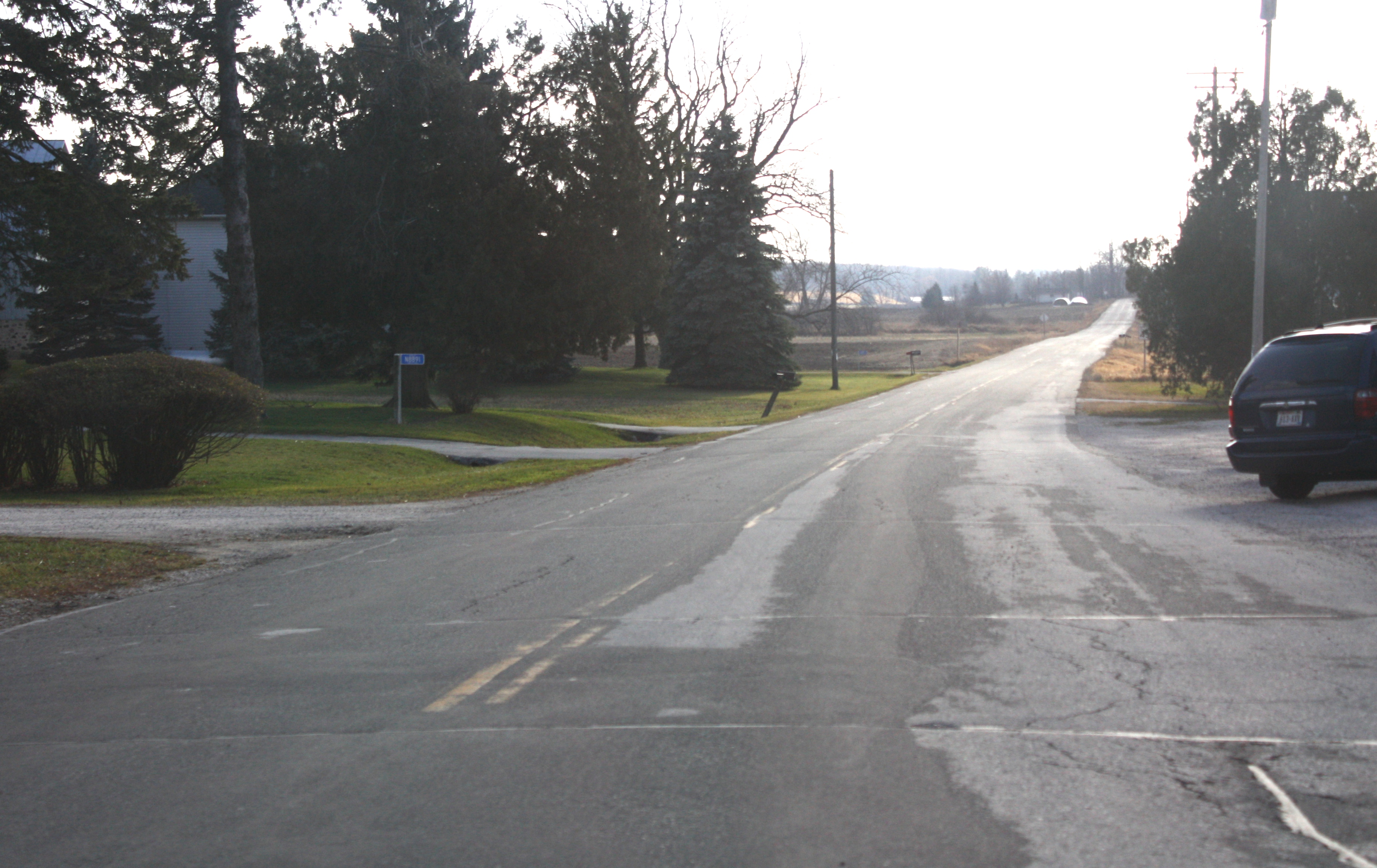
- Looking south in Rhine Center

- Location within Wisconsin Location within the United States
- Coordinates: 43°51′46″N 87°57′24″W
- Country: United States
- State: Wisconsin
- County: Sheboygan
- Elevation: 938 ft (286 m)
- Time zone: UTC-6 (Central (CST))
  - Summer (DST): UTC-5 (CDT)
- Area code: 920
- GNIS feature ID: 1572230

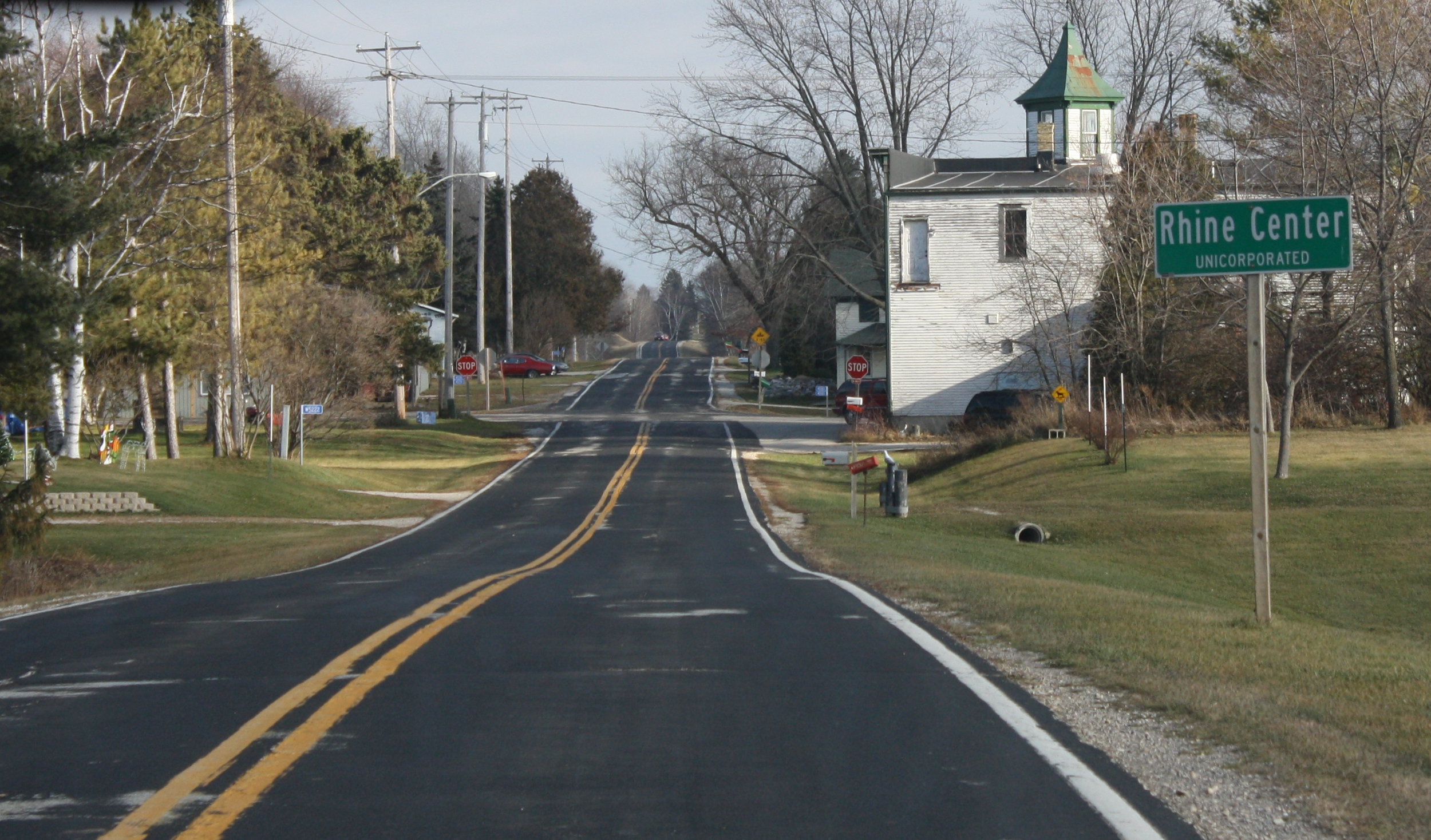
Looking east at the sign for Rhine Center

Rhine Center (also known as Rhine) is an unincorporated community located in the town of Rhine, Sheboygan County, Wisconsin, United States. Rhine is located on County Highway MM 3.7 miles (6.0 km) east-northeast of Elkhart Lake.
