= 1937 Wisconsin Supreme Court election =

- April 6, 1937
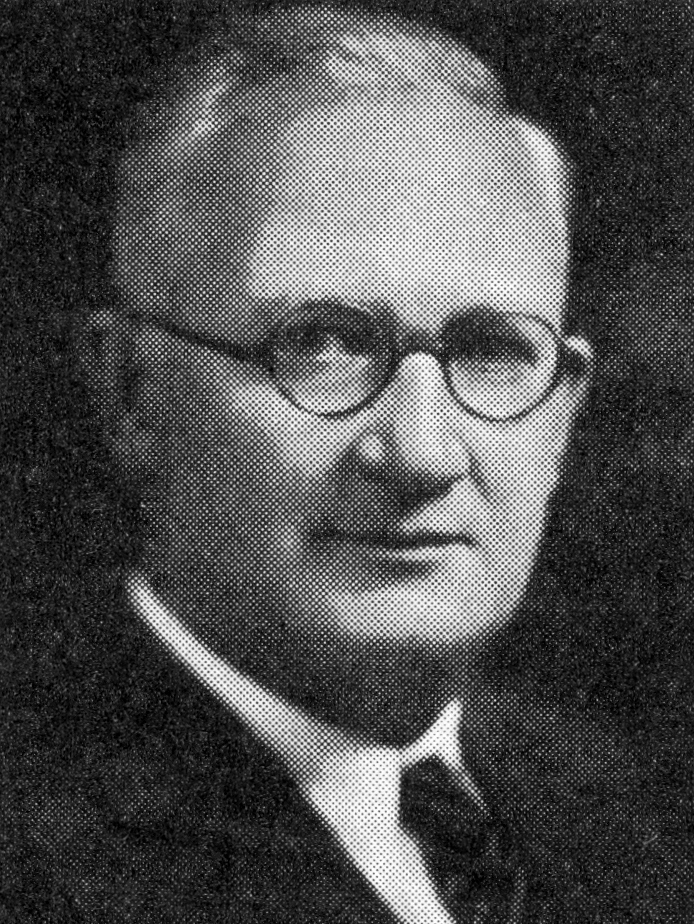

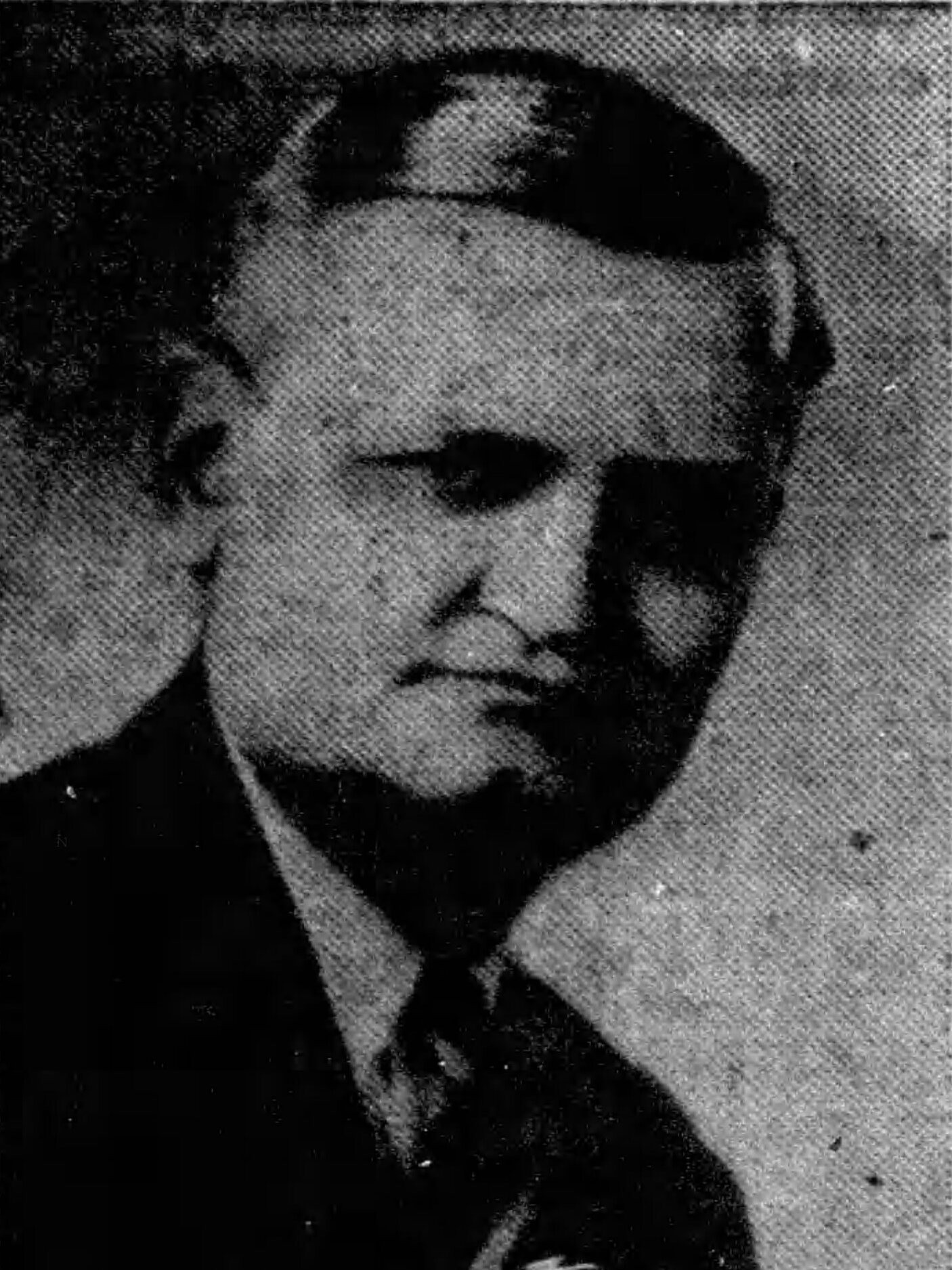

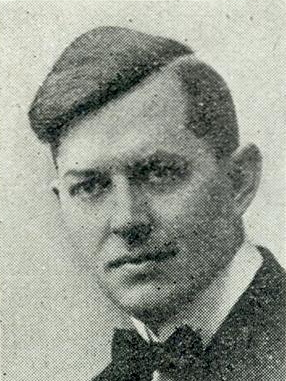
Candidate	Joseph Martin	Fred M. Wylie	Glenn P. Turner
Popular vote	309,081	179,036	115866
Percentage	51.17%	29.64%	19.18%
Justice before election
Joseph Martin
Elected Justice
Joseph Martin

The 1937 Wisconsin Supreme Court election was held on Tuesday, April 6, 1937, to elect a justice to the Wisconsin Supreme Court for a ten-year term. Incumbent justice Joseph Martin (who had been appointed in 1934) defeated two challengers by a large margin.

== Background ==
Joseph Martin was appointed by Governor Albert G. Schmedeman, to fill a vacancy on the court on December 31, 1934. No special election was held in the intervening years before the next regularly scheduled election in 1937.

== Candidates ==
=== Ran ===
- Joseph Martin (of Green Bay): incumbent justice (appointed in 1934); former chair of the Democratic Party of Wisconsin
- Glenn P. Turner (of Madison): lawyer, frequent Socialist candidate, former member of the state legislature
- Fred M. Wylie (of Milwaukee): lawyer and state trades practice commissioner and Progressive nominee for Wisconsin Attorney General in 1934

=== Declined to run ===
- Alvin C. Reis: circuit court (Dane County) judge

== Campaign ==
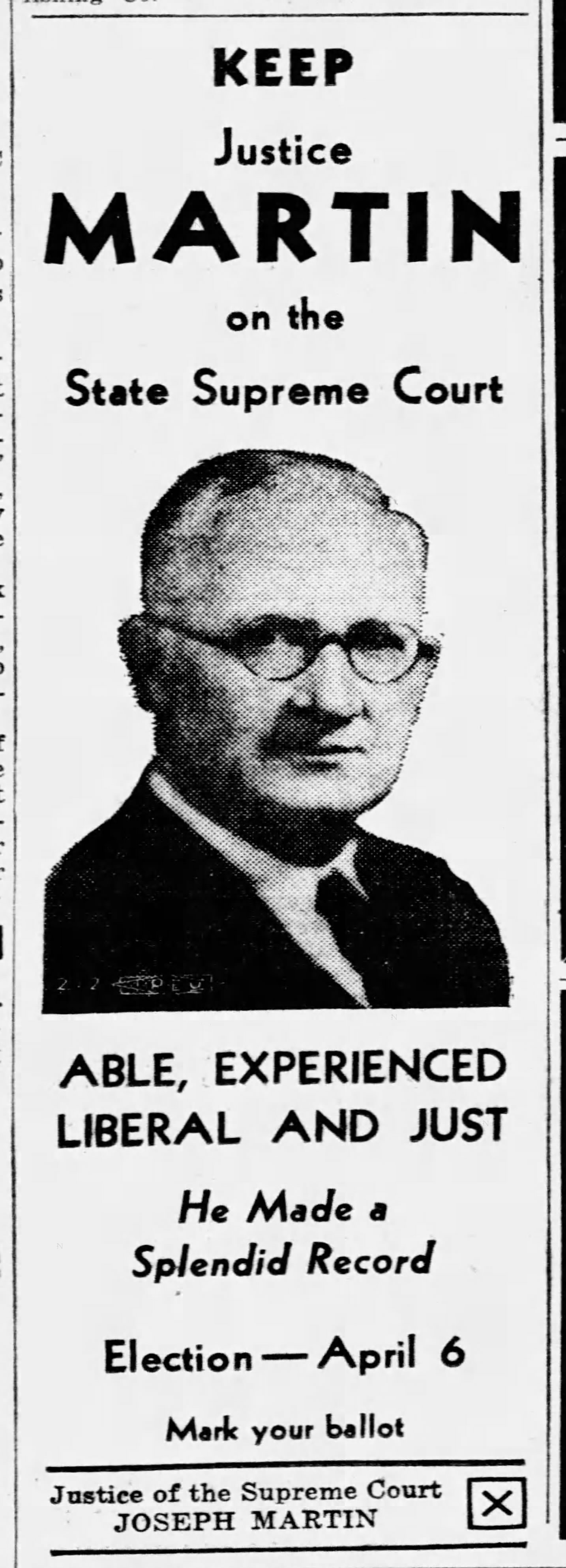
Ad for Martin's campaign

Some liberal groups attempted to get Wylie to abandon his candidacy, believing that a campaign by Reiss instead would give Martin a stronger challenge. Wylie refused to withdraw in favor of Reiss, however. Both Wylie and Turner sought to win over Progressive and Farmer–Labor voters.

== Result ==
1937 Wisconsin Supreme Court election
Party	Candidate	Votes	%
General election (April 7, 1937)
Nonpartisan	Joseph Martin (incumbent)	309,081	51.17
Nonpartisan	Fred M. Wylie	179,036	29.64
Nonpartisan	Glenn P. Turner	115,866	19.18
Majority		130,045	21.53
Total votes		603,983	100
