= Curt W. Janke =

American politician and businessman

Curt W. Janke (September 30, 1892 – July 3, 1975) was an American politician and businessman.

Born in Howards Grove, Wisconsin, Janke moved to Sheboygan, Wisconsin went to Sheboygan High School and Sheboygan Business College. Janke was a public accountant and was in the real estate business. He served on the Sheboygan Common Council. Janke served in the Wisconsin State Assembly from 1929 to 1933 and was a Republican. Janke died in Sheboygan, Wisconsin.
