= Otto C. Neumeister =

American politician (1866–1938)

Otto C. Neumeister (June 5, 1866 – December 7, 1938) was an American businessman, pharmacist, and politician.

Born in Howards Grove, Sheboygan County, Wisconsin, Neumeister studied at the Philadelphia College of Pharmacy. He was involved with the drug business in Howards Grove until 1910. He helped organized the Farmers and Merchant Bank of Sheboygan and the Sheboygan First Mortgage Loan and Investment Company in Sheboygan, Wisconsin. Neumeister served on the Sheboygan Board of Education and on the Sheboygan County Board of Supervisors. He was a Democrat. In 1915, Neumeister served in the Wisconsin State Assembly. Neumeister died in a hospital in Sheboygan, Wisconsin and was 72.
