= Hübingen =

- Municipality
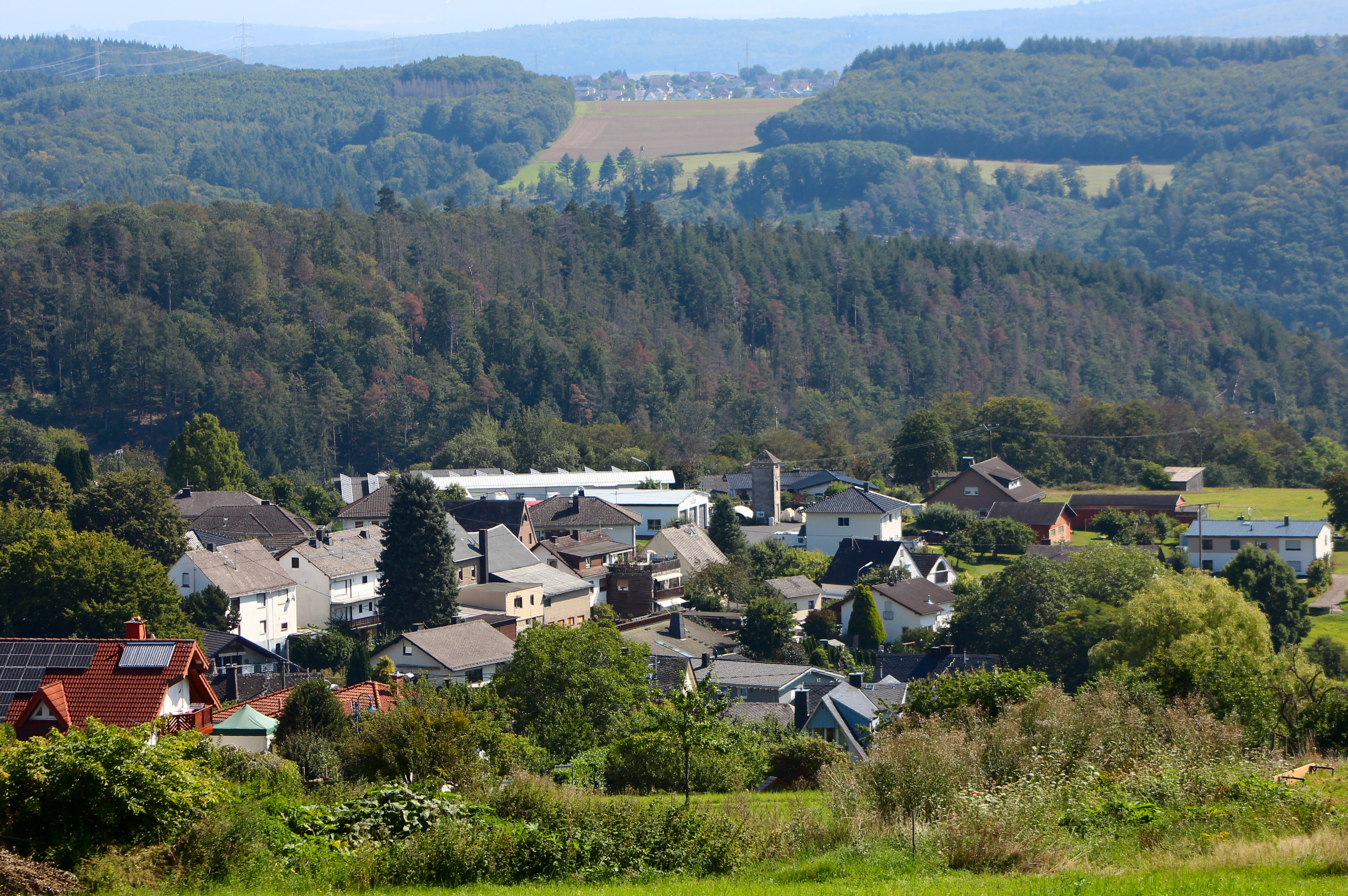

- Coat of arms

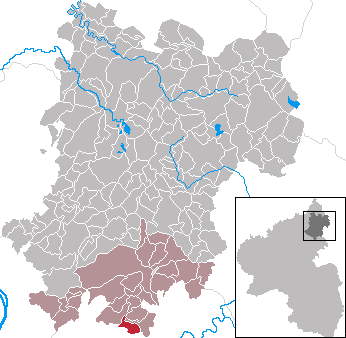
- Location of Hübingen within Westerwaldkreis district
- Interactive map of Hübingen
- Location within Germany Location within Rhineland-Palatinate
- Coordinates: 50°21′31″N 7°50′46″E
- Country: Germany
- State: Rhineland-Palatinate
- District: Westerwaldkreis
- Municipal assoc.: Montabaur

Government
  - Mayor (2019–24): Thomas Sanner-Brohl

Area
  - Total: 3.56 km^{2} (1.37 sq mi)
- Elevation: 330 m (1,080 ft)

Population (2025-12-31)
  - Total: 524
  - Density: 147/km^{2} (381/sq mi)
- Time zone: UTC+01:00 (CET)
  - Summer (DST): UTC+02:00 (CEST)
- Postal codes: 56412
- Dialling codes: 06439
- Vehicle registration: WW
- Website: www.vg-montabaur.de

Hübingen (German pronunciation: [ˈhyːbɪŋən]) is an Ortsgemeinde – a community belonging to a Verbandsgemeinde – in the Westerwaldkreis in Rhineland-Palatinate, Germany.

== Geography ==
The community lies in the Westerwald south of Montabaur in the Nassau Nature Park. Hübingen lies at the foot of the Fußberg (a mountain, also known as the Buchenberg) on whose north slope is found a family holiday village run by the Catholic Church. It was built in the 1970s. Through the community flows the Hohentalbach. The community belongs to the Verbandsgemeinde of Montabaur, a kind of collective municipality.

== History ==
In 1347, Hübingen had its first documentary mention.

== Politics ==
=== Community council ===
The council is made up of 12 council members who were elected in a majority vote in a municipal election on 13 June 2004.

=== Coat of arms ===
The two linden twigs in the community's arms are a symbol of the community's patron saint, Wendelin. The sheaf symbolizes agriculture. In the lower half, the two-coloured wavy fess stands for the two brooks that flow through the municipal area and frame the community, the Gelbach and the Hohentalbach. The tinctures silver and red refer to Hübingen's almost 800-year-long allegiance to the Electorate of Trier. The green has to do with the community's wealth of woodland.

== Economy and infrastructure ==
The nearest Autobahn interchange is Montabaur on the A 3 (Cologne–Frankfurt), some 10 km away.
