= Joseph Vernon Jones =

American politician

Member of the Wisconsin State Assembly
- In office 1887–1887

Personal details
- Born: August 23, 1834 Chester County, Pennsylvania

Joseph Vernon Jones (August 23, 1834 - October 9, 1912) of Urne, Wisconsin was a member of the Wisconsin State Assembly during the 1887 session. Jones represented Buffalo County, Wisconsin. He was a Republican.
