= Glenn P. Turner =

American politician

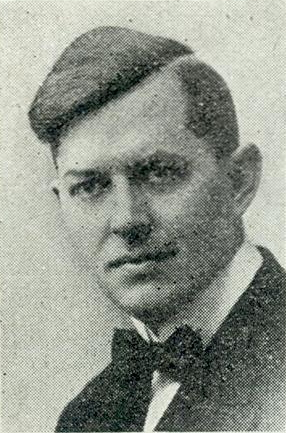
Turner, circa 1917

Glenn Patterson Turner (May 4, 1889 – July 10, 1975) was a lawyer from Milwaukee who served one term as a Socialist Party of America member of the Wisconsin State Assembly.

== Background ==
Turner was born on May 4, 1889, in Stockbridge, Wisconsin. He attended the public schools of the various places where his father served as a Methodist minister. He became interested in socialism as a boy, through the influence of his Sunday school teacher, a German iron moulder, who started him reading Socialist literature. He joined the Socialist Party as soon as he was permitted to join (the age of 18). He graduated in 1909 from North Division High School (Milwaukee), and attended the University of Wisconsin. He graduated from the University of Wisconsin Law School, and was admitted to the Wisconsin bar in 1916. He then returned to Milwaukee to practice. Later in life he was a strong proponent of Esperanto. He died on July 10, 1975, at a nursing home in Black Earth, Wisconsin.

== Legislature ==
Turner was elected to the Assembly in 1916 to succeed fellow Socialist Frank J. Weber, receiving 3,054 votes against 2,067 for S. A. Heiden (Republican) and 1038 for A. E. Wanda (Democrat). He was assigned to the standing committee on the judiciary.

He did not run for re-election in 1918, but was succeeded by fellow Socialist and lawyer Edwin Knappe, who like Turner was a member of the law firm of Kleist, Harriman & Knappe.

== Attorney General campaign ==
In 1930, Turner was the Socialist candidate for state Attorney General; he came in third in a five-way race, with 6.4% of the vote (35,169 out of 551,563).

== State supreme court campaigns ==
Turner unsuccessfully ran for seats on the Wisconsin Supreme Court in 1936 and 1937.

== Governor campaign ==
Turner unsuccessfully ran for governor of Wisconsin in 1938.
