= Michael J. Flaherty =

American politician

A 1900 portrait of Michael J. Flaherty

Michael J. Flaherty (July 7, 1862 – August 10, 1921) was an American businessman, farmer, and politician.

Born in the town of Morrison, Brown County, Wisconsin, Flaherty was a farmer and livestock dealer. He was also involved with the banking, dairy, grain and paper businesses. Flaherty served as treasurer for the town of Morrison. He also served on the school board and served as the board treasurer. In 1899 and 1901, Flaherty served in the Wisconsin State Assembly and was a Democrat. Flaherty died at his home in Morrison, Wisconsin.
