= William Noll =

American politician

Member of the Wisconsin State Assembly
- In office 1867

Personal details
- Born: March 23, 1834 Hübingen, Germany
- Died: March 23, 1908 (aged 74) Marshfield, Wisconsin, U.S.
- Party: Republican

William Noll (March 23, 1834 – March 23, 1908) was a German-born American businessman and politician who served as a member of the Wisconsin State Assembly in 1876.

== Background ==
Noll was born in Hübingen, Germany. He became a hardware merchant. Noll was a member of the Wisconsin State Assembly in 1876 as a Republican. He served as town clerk of Lyndon, Sheboygan County, Wisconsin in 1875 and a supervisor of the town of Lyndon in 1877. Noll died on March 23, 1908, in Marshfield, Wisconsin.
