= Herman, Sheboygan County, Wisconsin =

Herman, Wisconsin
- Town
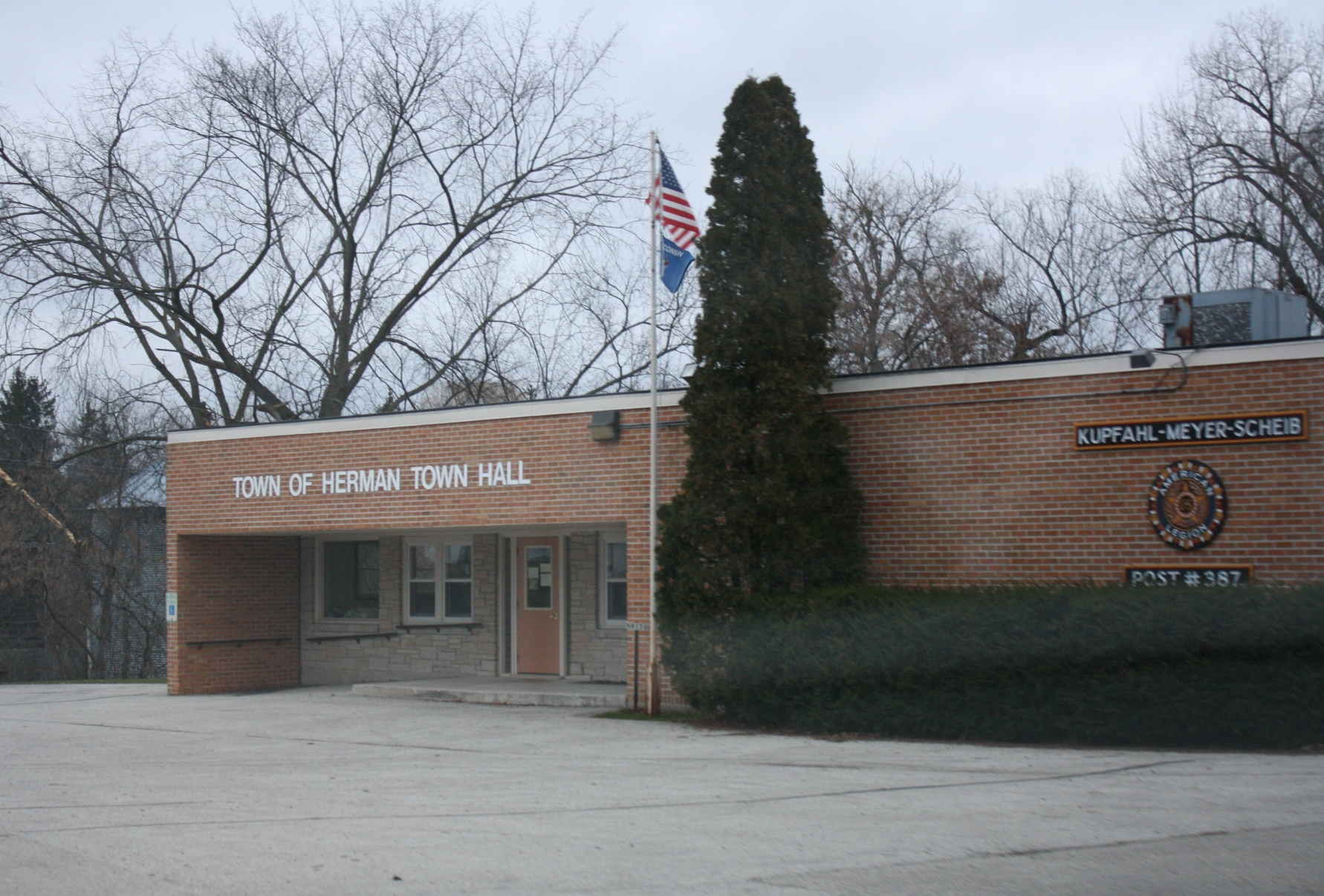
- Town hall in Franklin

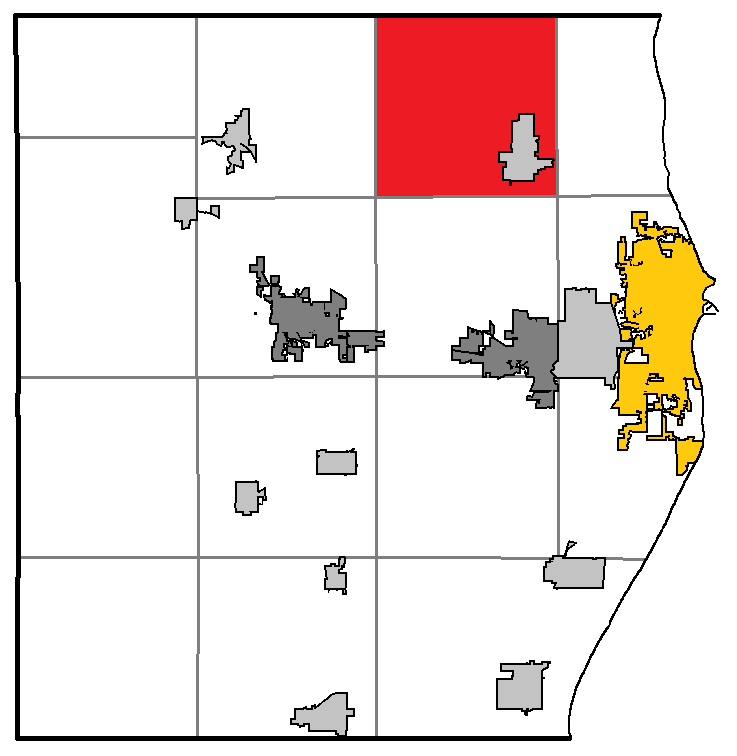
- Location of Herman, within Sheboygan County
- Coordinates: 43°51′11″N 87°51′40″W
- Country: United States
- State: Wisconsin
- County: Sheboygan

Area
  - Total: 34.2 sq mi (88.7 km^{2})
  - Land: 34.1 sq mi (88.4 km^{2})
  - Water: 0.12 sq mi (0.3 km^{2})
- Elevation: 814 ft (248 m)

Population (2020)
  - Total: 2,162
  - Density: 63.3/sq mi (24.5/km^{2})
- Time zone: UTC-6 (Central (CST))
  - Summer (DST): UTC-5 (CDT)
- Area code: 920
- FIPS code: 55-34050
- GNIS feature ID: 1583381
- Website: https://townherman.com/

Herman is a town in Sheboygan County, Wisconsin, United States. The population was 2,162 at the 2020 census. It is included in the Sheboygan Metropolitan Statistical Area. The town is home to Lakeland University.

== Communities ==
- Ada is an unincorporated community located along and at the intersection of WIS 32 and County Road EH.
- Edwards is an unincorporated community located along WIS 42 just south of the Manitowoc-Sheboygan County Line. Most of the development in the community is located north of the Pigeon River.
- Franklin is an unincorporated community located north of the intersection of County Road A and M. Lakeland University is located nearby on County Road M.

== Geography ==
According to the United States Census Bureau, the town has a total area of 34.2 square miles (88.7 km^{2}), of which 34.1 square miles (88.4 km^{2}) is land and 0.1 square miles (0.3 km^{2}) (0.32%) is water.

== Demographics ==
As of the census of 2000, there were 2,044 people, 574 households, and 458 families residing in the town. The population density was 59.9 people per square mile (23.1/km^{2}). There were 592 housing units at an average density of 17.3 per square mile (6.7/km^{2}). The racial makeup of the town was 95.40% White, 2.50% African American, 0.10% Native American, 1.08% Asian, 0.54% from other races, and 0.39% from two or more races. Hispanic or Latino of any race were 1.22% of the population.

There were 574 households, out of which 35.9% had children under the age of 18 living with them, 72.3% were married couples living together, 3.1% had a female householder with no husband present, and 20.2% were non-families. 15.7% of all households were made up of individuals, and 5.7% had someone living alone who was 65 years of age or older. The average household size was 2.76 and the average family size was 3.07.

In the town, the population was spread out, with 20.4% under the age of 18, 24.5% from 18 to 24, 25.4% from 25 to 44, 20.1% from 45 to 64, and 9.6% who were 65 years of age or older. The median age was 30 years. For every 100 females, there were 113.6 males. For every 100 females age 18 and over, there were 116.8 males.

The median income for a household in the town was $51,875, and the median income for a family was $60,568. Males had a median income of $36,841 versus $26,375 for females. The per capita income for the town was $24,007. About 2.0% of families and 5.3% of the population were below the poverty line, including 1.6% of those under age 18 and 15.2% of those age 65 or over.

== Education ==
- Lakeland University is located in the town.

== Notable people ==
- August Meyers, farmer, businessman, and politician, was born in the town
- William F. Sieker, farmer and politician, lived in the town. Sieker served as Herman Town Board chairman

== See also ==
- List of towns in Wisconsin
