= Henry Ott =

American politician

Henry Ott (March 6, 1865 – October 7, 1949) was an American farmer, businessman, and politician.

Born in Cedar Grove, Wisconsin, Ott moved with his parents to the town of Plymouth, Sheboygan County, Wisconsin. He went to Plymouth High School in Plymouth, Wisconsin. Ott was a dairy farmer and was involved with the fire insurance business and the State Bank of Plymouth. Ott served as the Plymouth town clerk, the town, assessor, and the town board chairman. In 1913, 1921, and 1923, Ott served in the Wisconsin State Assembly and was a Republican. Ott died at a hospital in Plymouth, Wisconsin.
