= Henry Hayes (politician) =

American politician

Henry Hayes was a member of the Wisconsin State Assembly during the 1863 session. Hayes represented the 3rd District of Sheboygan County, Wisconsin, United States. He was a Democrat.
