= Elkhart Lake, Wisconsin =

- Village
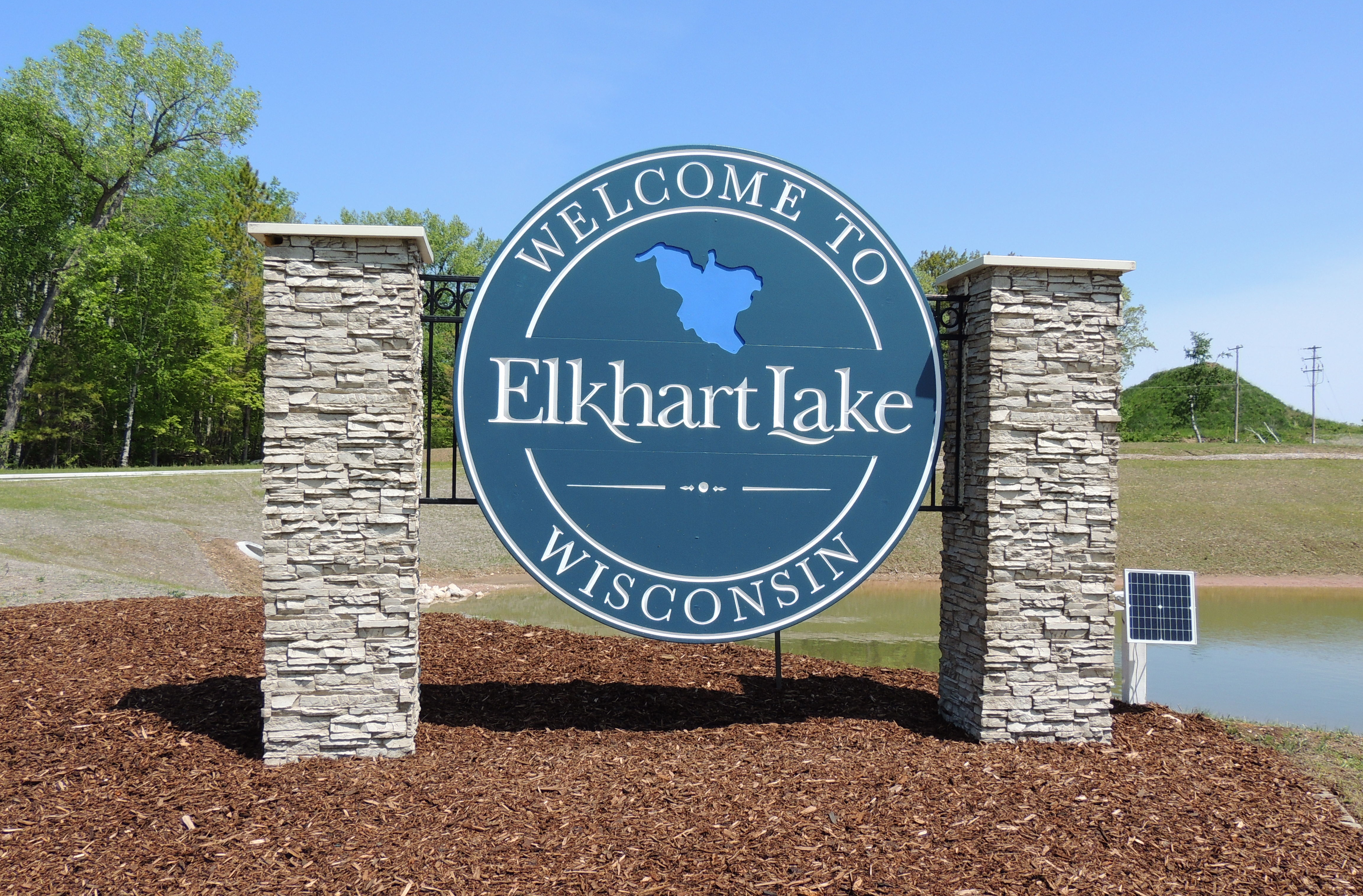

- Location of Elkhart Lake in Sheboygan County, Wisconsin.
- Coordinates: 43°49′55″N 88°1′3″W
- Country: United States
- State: Wisconsin
- County: Sheboygan

Area
  - Total: 1.29 sq mi (3.34 km^{2})
  - Land: 1.28 sq mi (3.32 km^{2})
  - Water: 0.0077 sq mi (0.02 km^{2})
- Elevation: 948 ft (289 m)

Population (2020)
  - Total: 941
  - Density: 734/sq mi (283/km^{2})
- Time zone: UTC-6 (Central (CST))
  - Summer (DST): UTC-5 (CDT)
- Area code: 920
- FIPS code: 55-23275
- GNIS feature ID: 1584500
- Website: www.elkhartlakewi.gov

Elkhart Lake is a village in northwestern Sheboygan County, Wisconsin, United States. The population was 941 at the 2020 census. It is within the Town of Rhine and is included in the Sheboygan, Wisconsin metropolitan area. Elkhart Lake may be best known for hosting road races on public county roads during the 1950s, later moving to a dedicated race track called Road America, a few miles south of the village.

== History ==
The area was first inhabited by the Potawatomi Indians and they named the area “Me-shay-way-odeh-ni-bis”, or Great Elk Heart Lake, because the lake resembles an elk's heart. Few people traveled to the area until the 1860s when the Mississippi Railroad came to Glenbeulah, making it possible for them to take a stagecoach the rest of the way to Elkhart. In 1872 the Milwaukee and Northern Railroad came into Elkhart and brought more travelers. The area was incorporated as Elkhart Lake in 1894.

== Geography ==
According to the United States Census Bureau, the village has a total area of 1.29 square miles (3.34 km^{2}), of which 1.28 square miles (3.32 km^{2}) is land and 0.01 square miles (0.03 km^{2}) is water.

== Demographics ==
Historical population
| Census | Pop. | Note | %± |
|---|---|---|---|
| 1900 | 464 | | — |
| 1910 | 499 | | 7.5% |
| 1920 | 527 | | 5.6% |
| 1930 | 571 | | 8.3% |
| 1940 | 571 | | 0.0% |
| 1950 | 587 | | 2.8% |
| 1960 | 651 | | 10.9% |
| 1970 | 787 | | 20.9% |
| 1980 | 1,054 | | 33.9% |
| 1990 | 1,019 | | −3.3% |
| 2000 | 1,021 | | 0.2% |
| 2010 | 967 | | −5.3% |
| 2020 | 941 | | −2.7% |
U.S. Decennial Census

=== 2010 census ===
As of the census of 2010, there were 967 people, 457 households, and 286 families living in the village. The population density was 755.5 inhabitants per square mile (291.7/km^{2}). There were 706 housing units at an average density of 551.6 per square mile (213.0/km^{2}). The racial makeup of the village was 97.7% White, 0.2% African American, 0.9% Native American, 0.8% from other races, and 0.3% from two or more races. Hispanic or Latino of any race were 1.7% of the population.

There were 457 households, of which 18.8% had children under the age of 18 living with them, 54.7% were married couples living together, 6.1% had a female householder with no husband present, 1.8% had a male householder with no wife present, and 37.4% were non-families. 28.4% of all households were made up of individuals, and 10.1% had someone living alone who was 65 years of age or older. The average household size was 2.12 and the average family size was 2.58.

The median age in the village was 48.9 years. 15.8% of residents were under the age of 18; 6.2% were between the ages of 18 and 24; 21.7% were from 25 to 44; 34.7% were from 45 to 64; and 21.7% were 65 years of age or older. The gender makeup of the village was 50.4% male and 49.6% female.

=== 2000 census ===
As of the census of 2000, there were 1,021 people, 436 households, and 292 families living in the village. The population density was 790.5 people per square mile (305.6/km^{2}). There were 599 housing units at an average density of 463.8 per square mile (179.3/km^{2}). The racial makeup of the village was 98.73% White, 0.10% Asian, 0.39% from other races, and 0.78% from two or more races. Hispanic or Latino of any race were 1.08% of the population.

There were 436 households, out of which 23.6% had children under the age of 18 living with them, 59.6% were married couples living together, 5.0% had a female householder with no husband present, and 33.0% were non-families. 26.4% of all households were made up of individuals, and 8.3% had someone living alone who was 65 years of age or older. The average household size was 2.28 and the average family size was 2.75.

In the village, the population was spread out, with 18.0% under the age of 18, 9.1% from 18 to 24, 25.3% from 25 to 44, 31.7% from 45 to 64, and 15.9% who were 65 years of age or older. The median age was 43 years. For every 100 females, there were 96.0 males. For every 100 females age 18 and over, there were 96.0 males.

The median income for a household in the village was $56,538, and the median income for a family was $60,694. Males had a median income of $37,708 versus $26,776 for females. The per capita income for the village was $27,873. About 0.7% of families and 2.3% of the population were below the poverty line, including 1.1% of those under age 18 and 2.1% of those age 65 or over.

== Economy ==
=== Racing ===
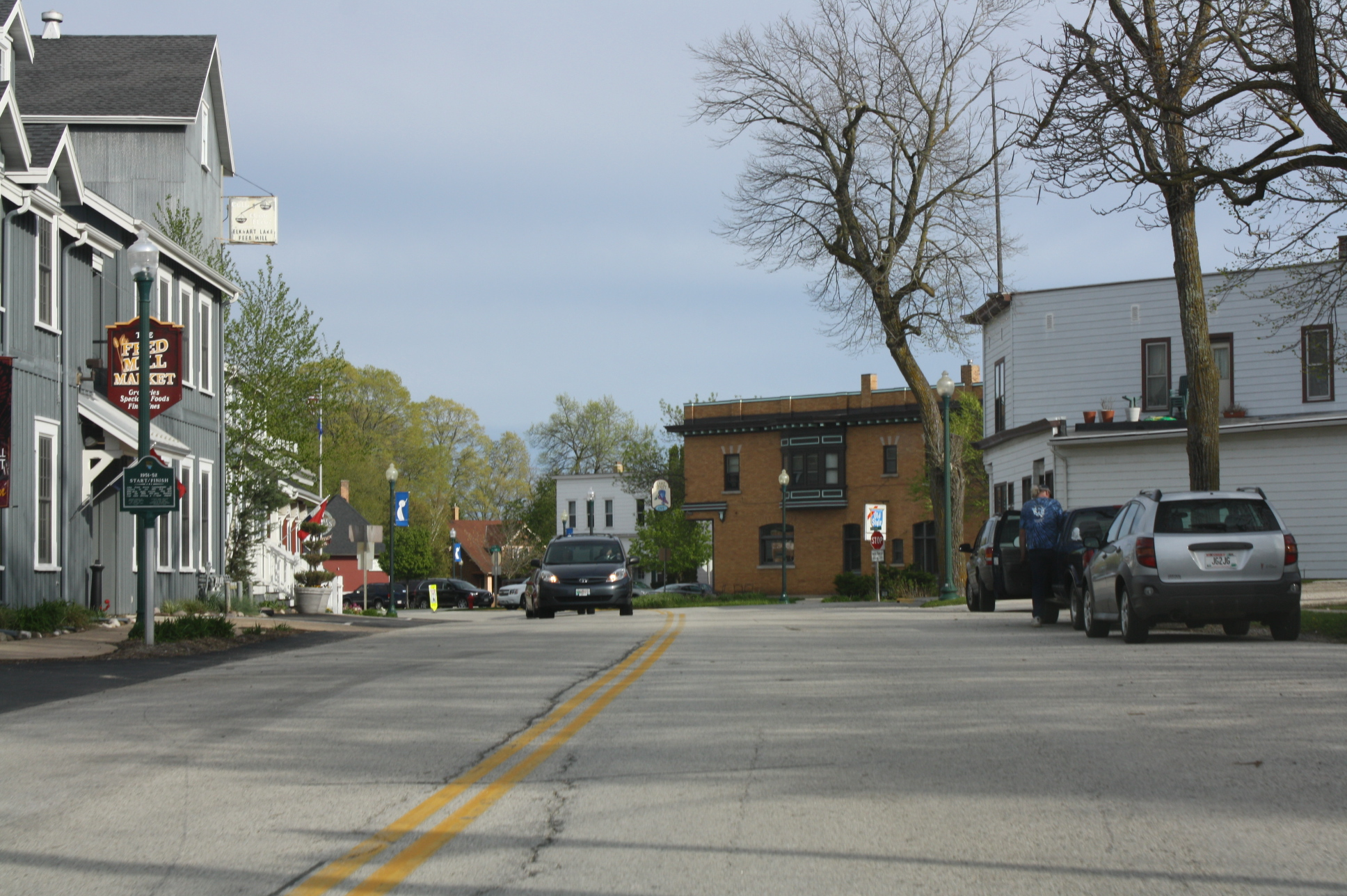
The site of the 1951 and 1952 start/finish line.

Racing at Elkhart Lake dates back to the 1950s. The very first races were held on July 23, 1950, on a 3.35 mile road circuit north of the lake. These first races were very successful for the time, drawing a crowd of over 5,000. Races were originally held on a street circuit that ran around the Lake with the start/finish line in the village. In 1951 and 1952, races were held on a new 6.5 mile circuit that circumvented the Lake. The 1951 races drew an estimated crowd of 50,000 spectators and the 1952 races saw an estimated crowd of over 100,000 people. The 1952 races would be the last races held on the open road circuit. Three years later, a new, specially designed track was built south of the village. Road America was built in 1955 with the first racing being held on September 10 & 11, 1955. Each year, Road America holds many events, one of the most popular being the IndyCar race in June. The economic impact on Sheboygan County from the track, its events, and visitors was estimated at $254 million in 2023.

== Arts and culture ==
=== Annual cultural events ===
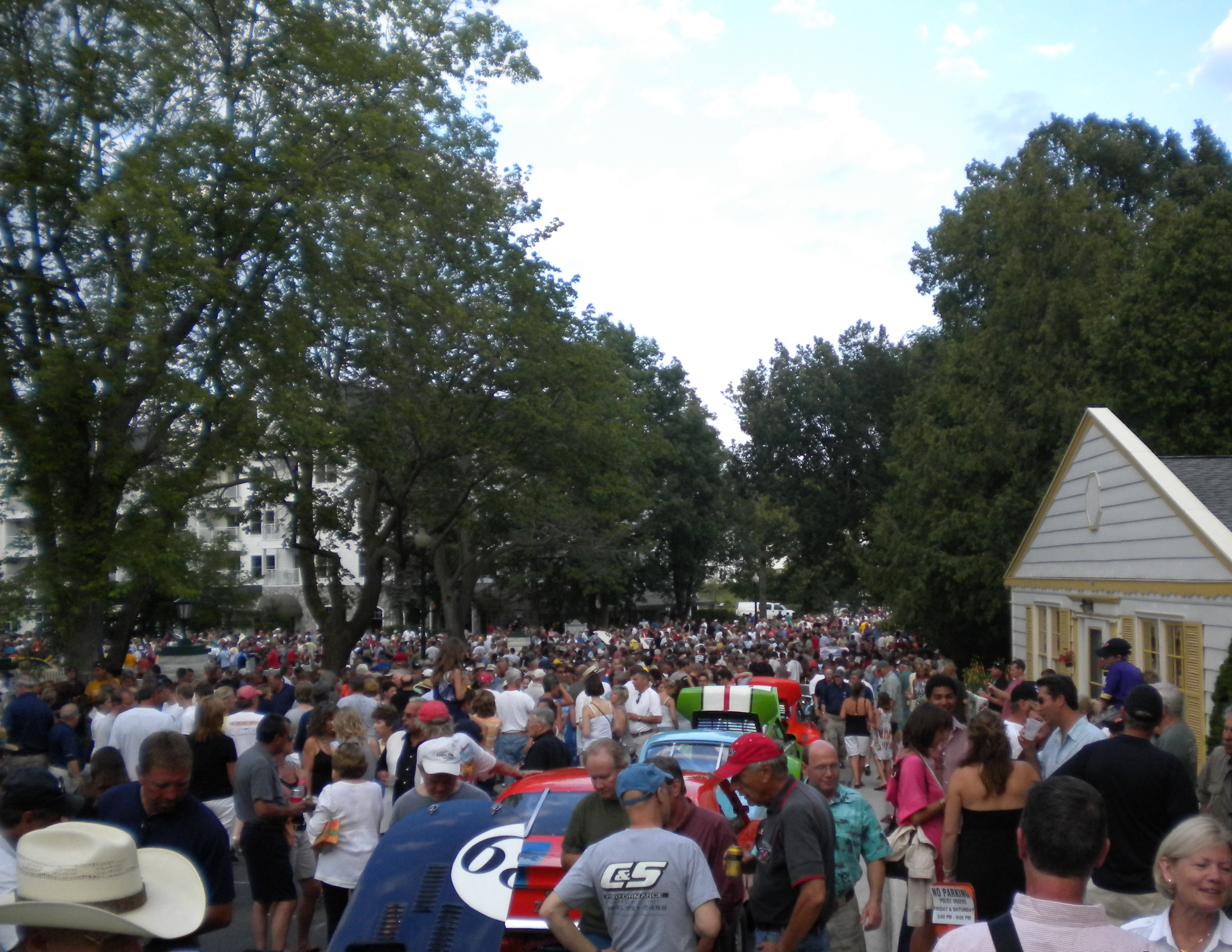
Crowd on Lake Street at the 2010 Road & Track Concours d'Elegance.

Every July, during the Kohler International Challenge, Road & Track holds a race car Concours d'Elegance in the village. This draws a large crowd as people line the streets from Road America to the shore of Elkhart Lake watching the cars drive past on their way to downtown Elkhart Lake. The cars park in the streets of Elkhart Lake, mainly on Lake Street, where curious visitors, car enthusiasts, and other racers alike walk up and down the streets looking at the cars. As the concourse comes to a close, Road & Track announces the winner of various awards including the best-looking car award. The cars return to the track around 7:30 pm, just before the sun sets because many of the cars do not have headlights.

Jazz on the Vine is an annual festival held in May. Jazz musicians from all over the United States come to the festival to perform.

=== Tourism ===
There are several museums in Elkhart Lake, including the Elkhart Lake Depot Museum and Henschel's Indian Museum. The Elkhart Lake Depot Museum is a century-old railroad station that has original depot furnishings and local memorabilia. Henschel's Indian Museum is located on an archaeological dig site and has a collection of Indian copper, pottery and artifacts that date back to 8,000 BC.

== Parks and recreation ==
Two parks in the area are Broughton Sheboygan Marsh Park and Fireman's Park and Swimming Beach. Broughton Sheboygan Marsh Park has campsites, fishing, picnic and camping areas and access to a snowmobile trail system. Fireman's Park and Swimming Beach is a seasonal sand beach.

== Education ==
=== Primary and secondary schools ===
Elkhart Lake is served by the Elkhart Lake-Glenbeulah School District. Schools in the district include Elkhart Lake Elementary/Middle School and Elkhart Lake-Glenbeulah High School.

=== Public libraries ===
The Elkhart Lake Public Library was established in 1906 and was originally located in an old hotel. The library serves Elkhart Lake and several communities in the area.

== Infrastructure ==
=== Transportation ===
Elkhart Lake is about one mile southeast of the northern terminus of the Kettle Moraine Scenic Drive. The Scenic Drive was part of the road racing circuit used in the 1950s. Wisconsin Highway 67 runs north/south through the city. Secondary routes include County Highway A from the northeast. County Highway J runs concurrent with the Kettle Moraine Scenic Drive through the city. They enter the city from the northwest, run north/south through the center of the city, and exit to the southwest.

== Notable people ==
- Leonard Bloomfield, linguist, spent part of his childhood in Elkhart Lake
- Patrick Geraghty, farmer, schoolteacher and legislator
- Nicolas Hammann, racing driver
- Otto A. La Budde, businessman, legislator, and president of the village of Elkhart Lake.
- Francis E. McGovern, 22nd Governor of Wisconsin, born in Elkhart Lake
