= Franklin, Sheboygan County, Wisconsin =

Franklin, Wisconsin
- Unincorporated community
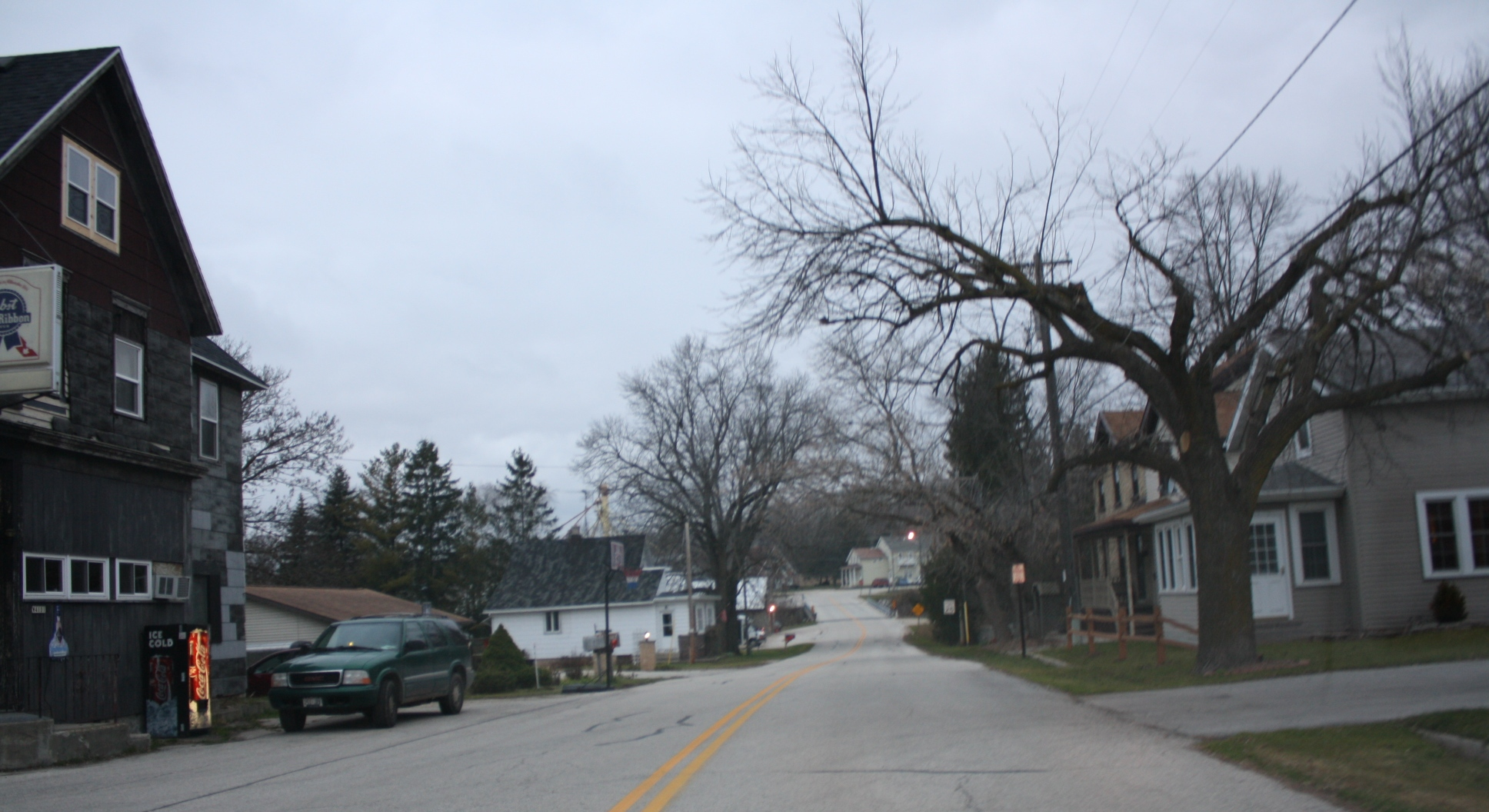
- Looking northwest in Franklin

- Location within Wisconsin Location within the United States
- Coordinates: 43°50′08″N 87°54′05″W
- Country: United States
- State: Wisconsin
- County: Sheboygan
- Elevation: 791 ft (241 m)
- Time zone: UTC-6 (Central (CST))
  - Summer (DST): UTC-5 (CDT)
- Area code: 920
- GNIS feature ID: 1565252

Franklin is an unincorporated community in the town of Herman, in Sheboygan County, Wisconsin, United States. Franklin is located at the intersection of County Highway M and the Sheboygan River, about 1 mile (1 km) from Lakeland College. The Franklin Feed Mill is listed on the National Register of Historic Places. The town hall for Herman is located inside the community.

== Notable people ==
- William F. Sieker, farmer and politician, lived on a farm near Franklin within the town of Herman.

== Images ==
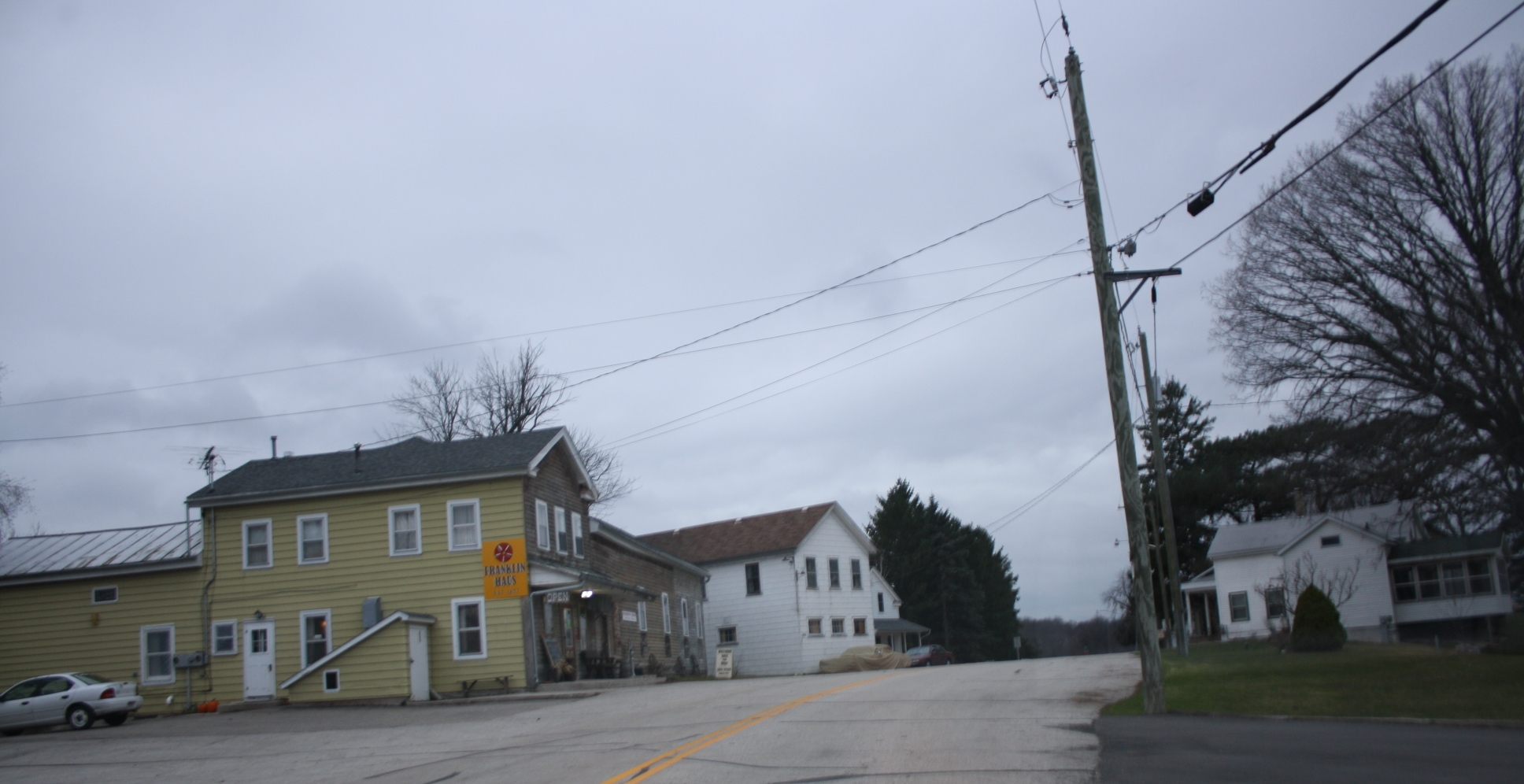
Looking south in Franklin

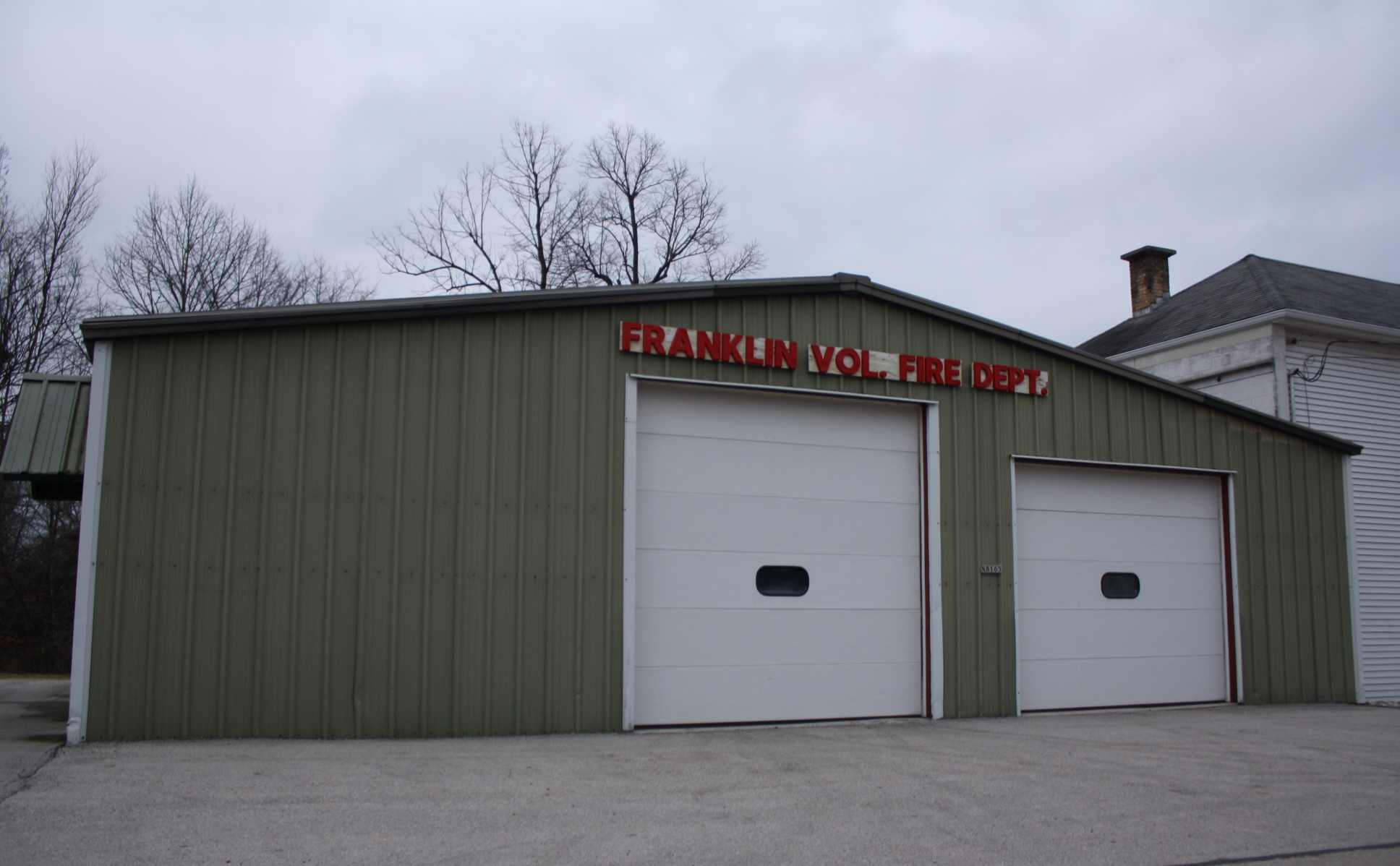
Volunteer Fire Department

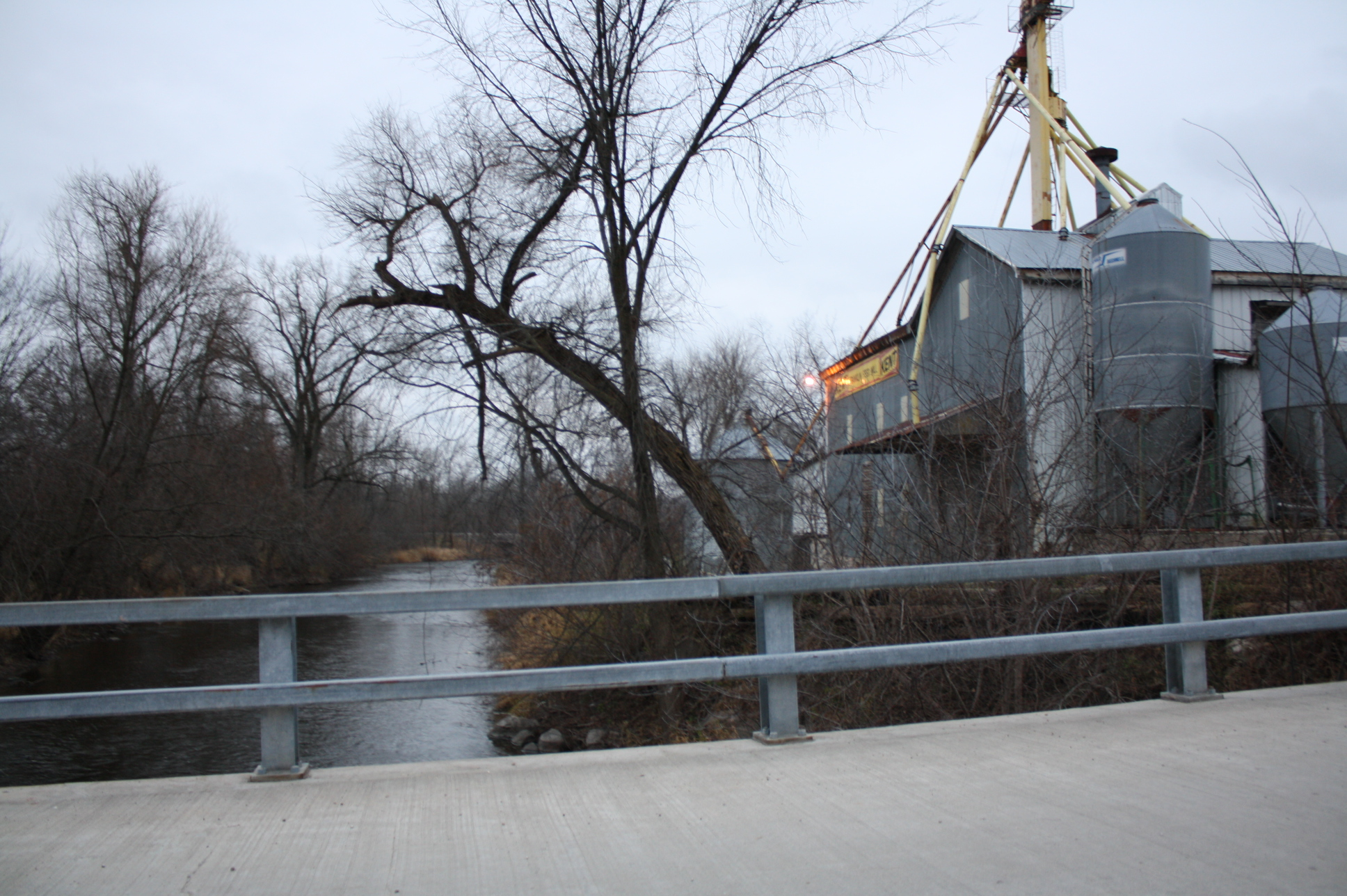
Franklin Feed Mill beside the Sheboygan River

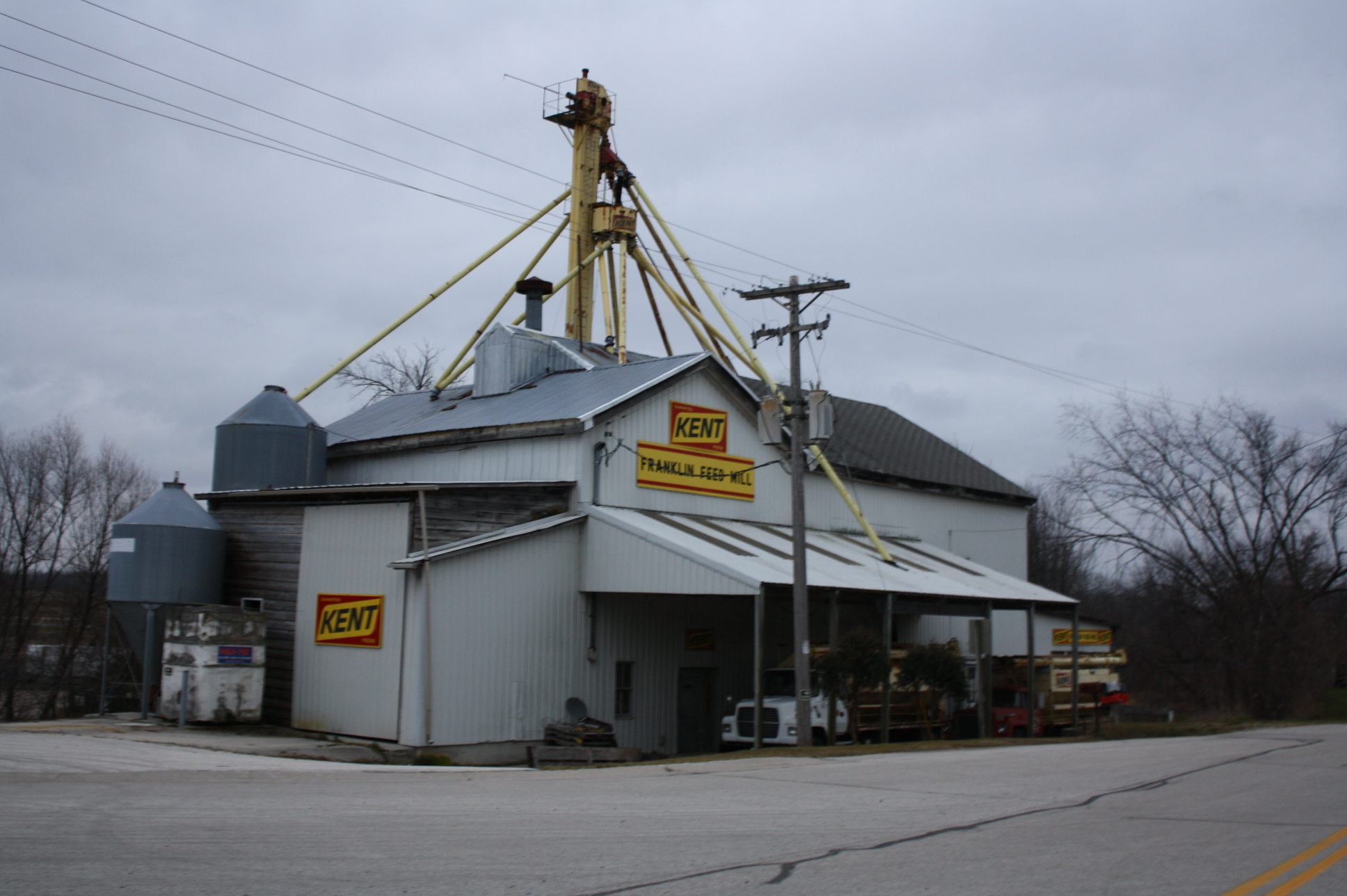
Franklin Feed Mill

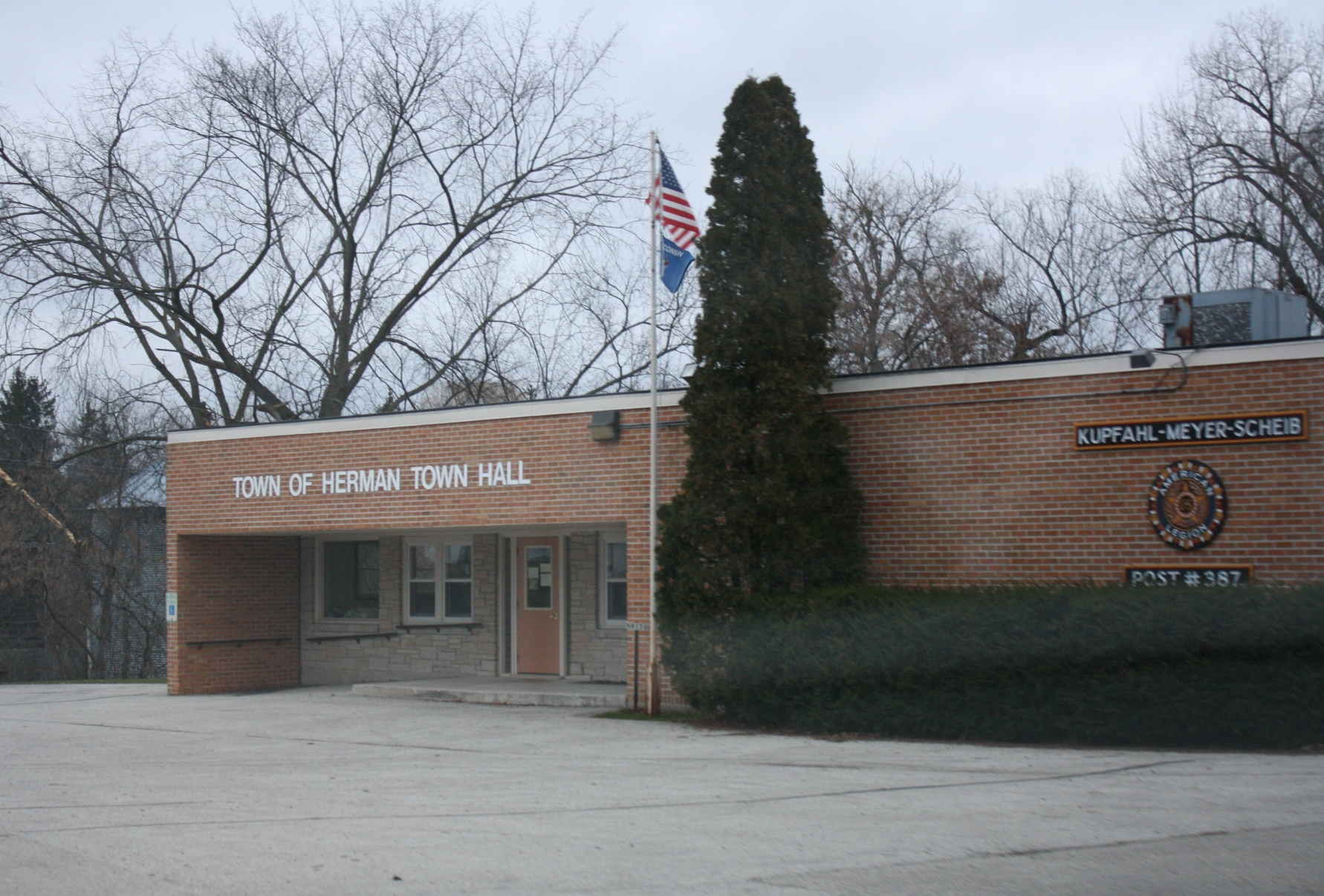
Herman town hall
