= Rhine, Wisconsin =

- Town
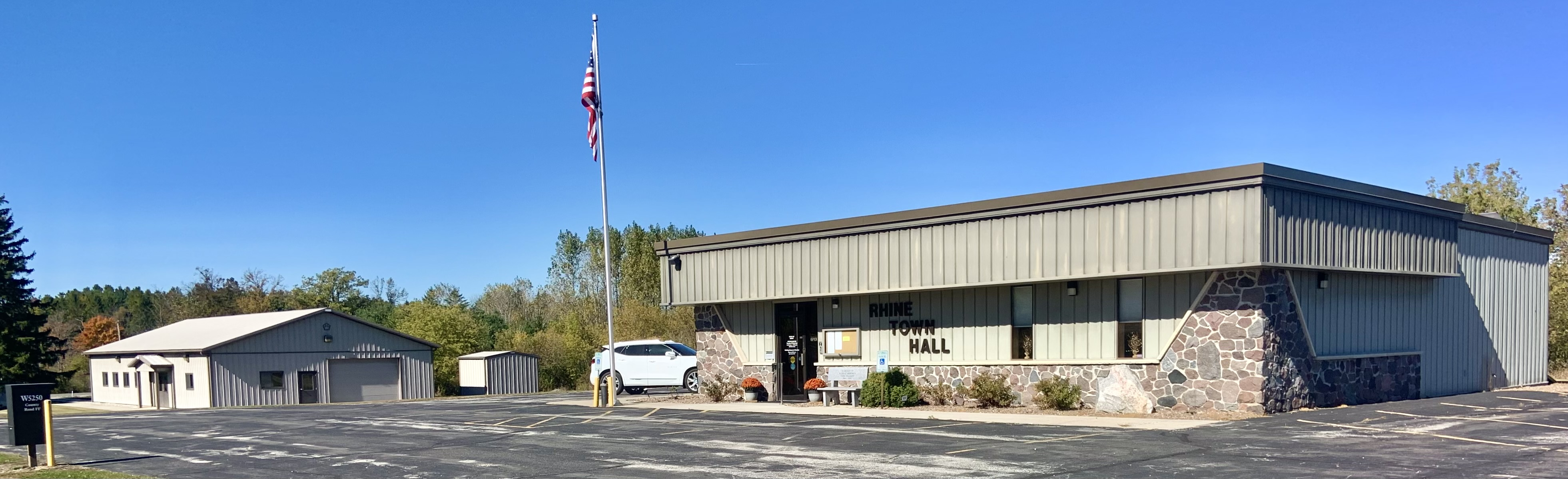
- Town hall

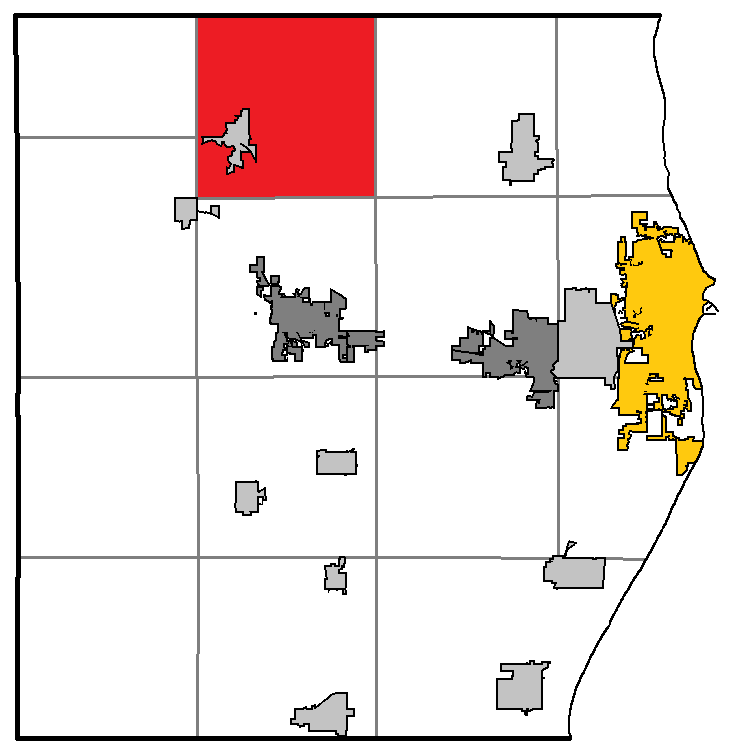
- Location of Rhine, within Sheboygan County
- Coordinates: 43°50′25″N 87°59′31″W
- Country: United States
- State: Wisconsin
- County: Sheboygan

Area
  - Total: 34.6 sq mi (89.7 km^{2})
  - Land: 33.7 sq mi (87.3 km^{2})
  - Water: 0.93 sq mi (2.4 km^{2})
- Elevation: 958 ft (292 m)

Population (2020)
  - Total: 2,139
  - Density: 63.5/sq mi (24.5/km^{2})
- Time zone: UTC-6 (Central (CST))
  - Summer (DST): UTC-5 (CDT)
- Area code: 920
- FIPS code: 55-67150
- GNIS feature ID: 1584013
- Website: www.townrhine.com

Rhine is a town in Sheboygan County, Wisconsin, United States. The population was 2,139 at the 2020 census. The village of Elkhart Lake is within the town. The unincorporated community of Rhine Center is also in the town. Rhine is included in the Sheboygan, Wisconsin Metropolitan Statistical Area.

== History ==
German settlers named the town after the Rhine River in Europe.

== Geography ==
According to the United States Census Bureau, the town has an area of 34.6 square miles (89.7 km^{2}), of which 33.7 square miles (87.3 km^{2}) is land and 0.9 square miles (2.4 km^{2}) (2.71%) is water.

== Demographics ==
As of the census of 2000, there were 2,244 people, 829 households, and 650 families residing in the town. The population density was 66.6 people per square mile (25.7/km^{2}). There were 961 housing units at an average density of 28.5 per square mile (11.0/km^{2}). The racial makeup of the town was 98.75% White, 0.04% African American, 0.27% Native American, 0.27% Asian, 0.09% Pacific Islander, 0.13% from other races, and 0.45% from two or more races. Hispanic or Latino of any race were 0.40% of the population.

There were 829 households, out of which 33.4% had children under the age of 18 living with them, 73.8% were married couples living together, 3.1% had a female householder with no husband present, and 21.5% were non-families. 17.4% of all households were made up of individuals, and 5.2% had someone living alone who was 65 years of age or older. The average household size was 2.71 and the average family size was 3.08.

In the town, the population was spread out, with 24.6% under the age of 18, 7.0% from 18 to 24, 28.6% from 25 to 44, 30.4% from 45 to 64, and 9.4% who were 65 years of age or older. The median age was 40 years. For every 100 females, there were 104.9 males. For every 100 females age 18 and over, there were 106.7 males.

The median income for a household in the town was $62,500, and the median income for a family was $66,471. Males had a median income of $40,942 versus $27,036 for females. The per capita income for the town was $27,059. About 0.3% of families and 1.4% of the population were below the poverty line, including none of those under age 18 and 2.4% of those age 65 or over.

== Notable people ==
- Philip H. Kasper, farmer and businessman
- Otto A. La Budde, state representative and businessman, born in Rhine
- George W. Wolff, politician and farmer

== See also ==
- Quasius Quarry
