= PBH =

PBH may refer to:

- Parboiled rice hulls
- Paro Airport
- Peter Brian Hegseth (born 1980), American government official and former television personality
- Pratapgarh Junction railway station
- Price County Airport
- Primordial black hole
- Pro Beach Hockey
