= Memorial to the Child Victims of War =

Public artwork in Lidice, Czech Republic

Coordinates: 50°08′33″N 14°11′59″E

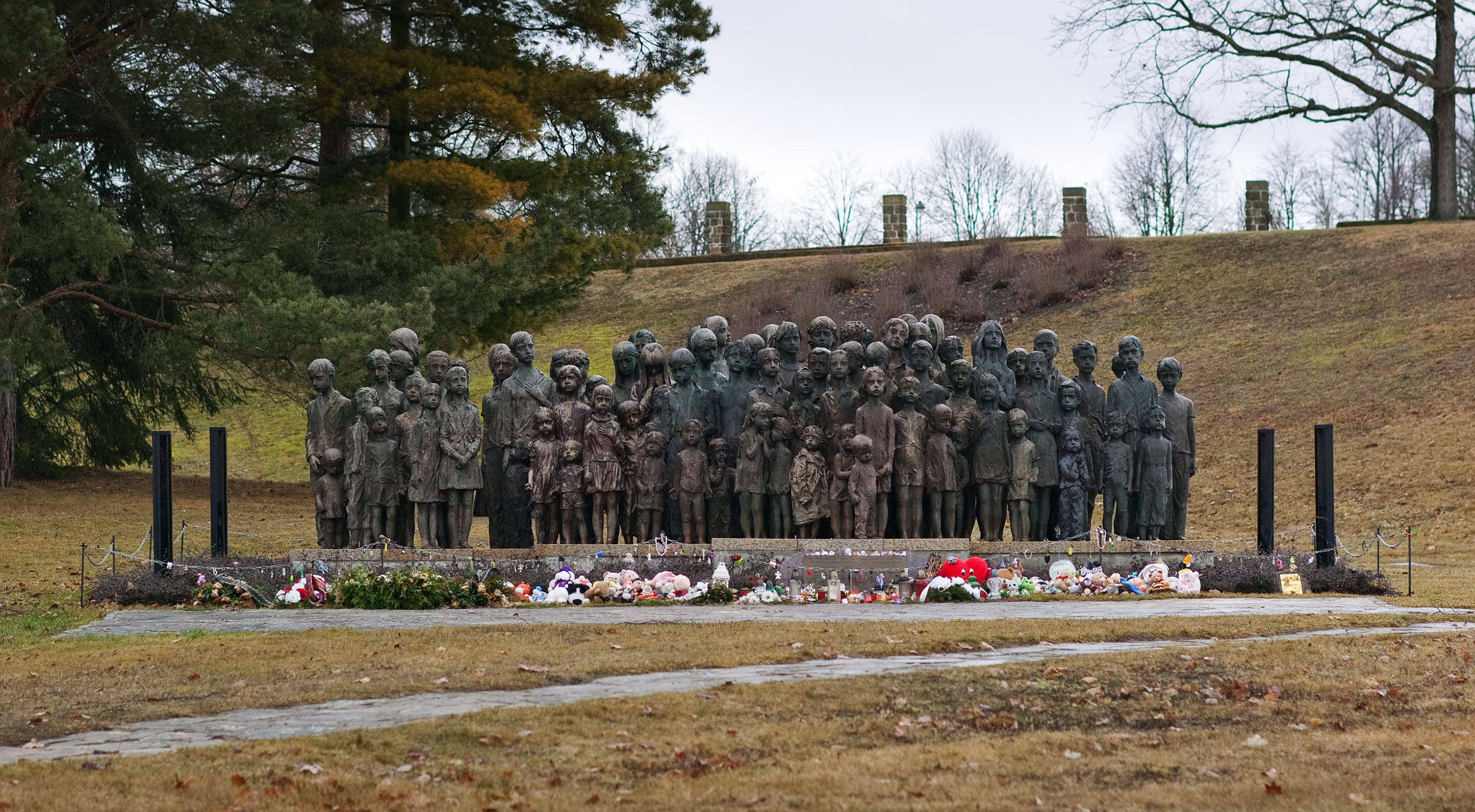
Memorial to the Child Victims of War

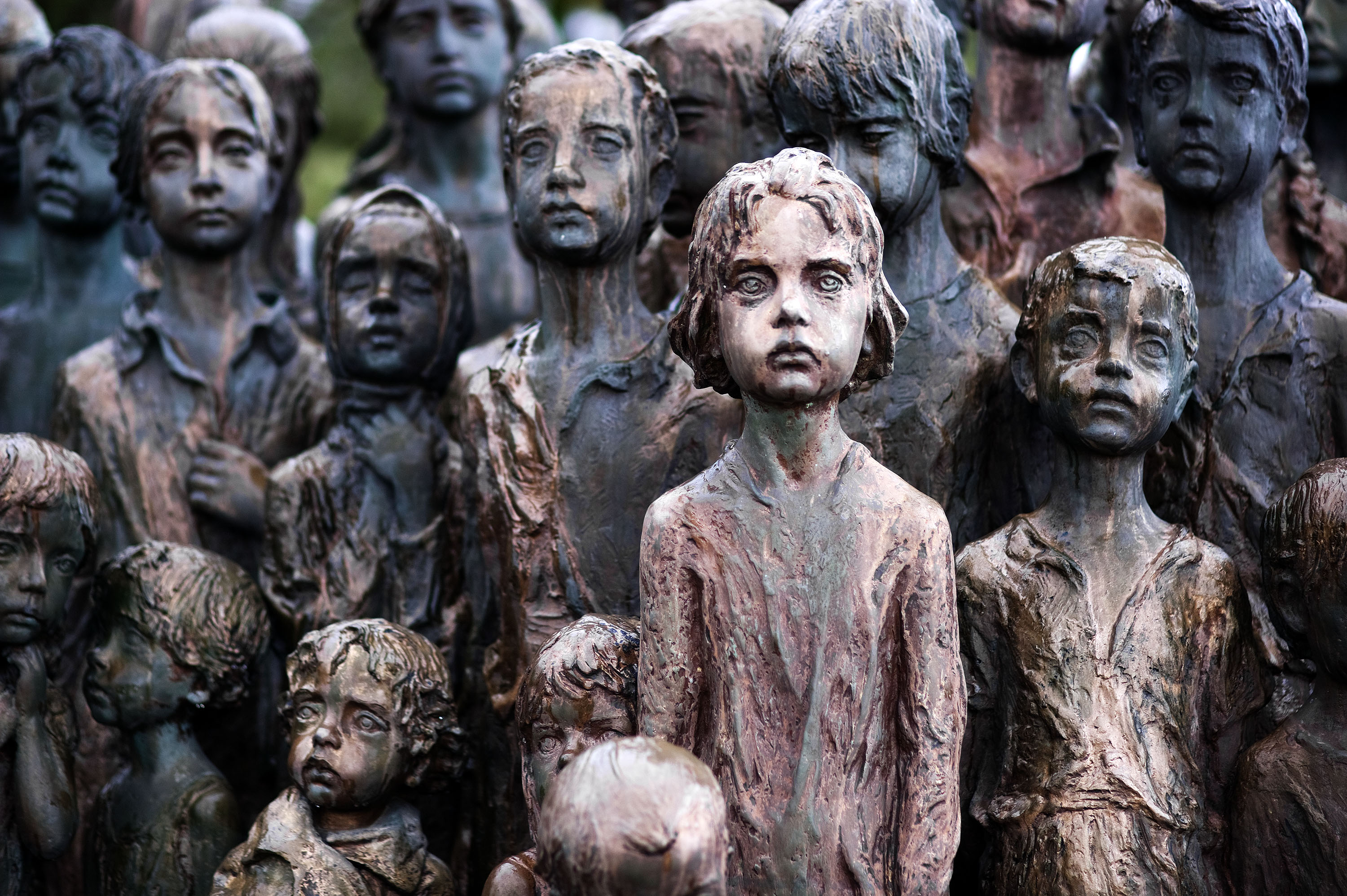
Detail of the memorial

The Memorial to the Child Victims of War (Czech: Pomník dětských obětí války) is a bronze sculpture by Marie Uchytilová in Lidice, Czech Republic. It commemorates a group of 82 children of Lidice who were gassed at Chełmno in the summer of 1942 during the Second World War as a part of the Lidice massacre. Work began on the memorial in 1980, but it was not until 2000, ten years after Uchytilová's death, that it was completed by her husband. The "Garden of Peace and Friendship" adjoins the memorial.

== Background ==
On 10 June 1942, the Nazis killed all 173 adult men and 52 women in Lidice as a reprisal for the assassination of Nazi official Reinhard Heydrich, the acting Reichsprotektor of the Protectorate of Bohemia and Moravia. The village was razed, seventeen children who were considered suitable to be "Germanized" were removed, and the remaining women and children, separated, were sent to concentration camps. The children were gassed that summer in mobile vans at Chełmno. Following the war, a cross was erected at Lidice in remembrance of the murdered children, but little else occurred for the next two decades.

== Features ==
In 1980, the sculptor Marie Uchytilová began plans for a memorial which would not only commemorate the local children who died at the camps but symbolize the "13 million child victims of World War II." Before starting on the castings, Uchytilová met the surviving mothers to understand the physical features and the personality traits of the children, and viewed pictures of them. However, she ensured that the sculptures were not fully recognizable. Towards the end of this period, before Uchytilová's death in 1989, she had only created plaster images of the despairing children; it was left to her husband, Jiří Václav Hampl, to complete the work in bronze castings. Financing of the memorial was facilitated by donations from the Government of the Czech Republic, as well as individual and foreign donors. The memorial, with statues rotated facing forward for 180 degrees, was finally erected in 2000. With a view of the old town of Lidice, it is set in a meadow where the villagers had been killed during the war.

== Bibliography ==
- Steele, Brent J. (2013). Alternative Accountabilities in Global Politics: The Scars of Violence. Routledge. ISBN 978-0-415-63269-0.
- Stehlík, Eduard (2004). Lidice: The Story of a Czech Village. V ráji for the Lidice Memorial. ISBN 978-80-86758-14-5.
