= Marie Uchytilová =

Czech medalist and sculptor (1924–1989)

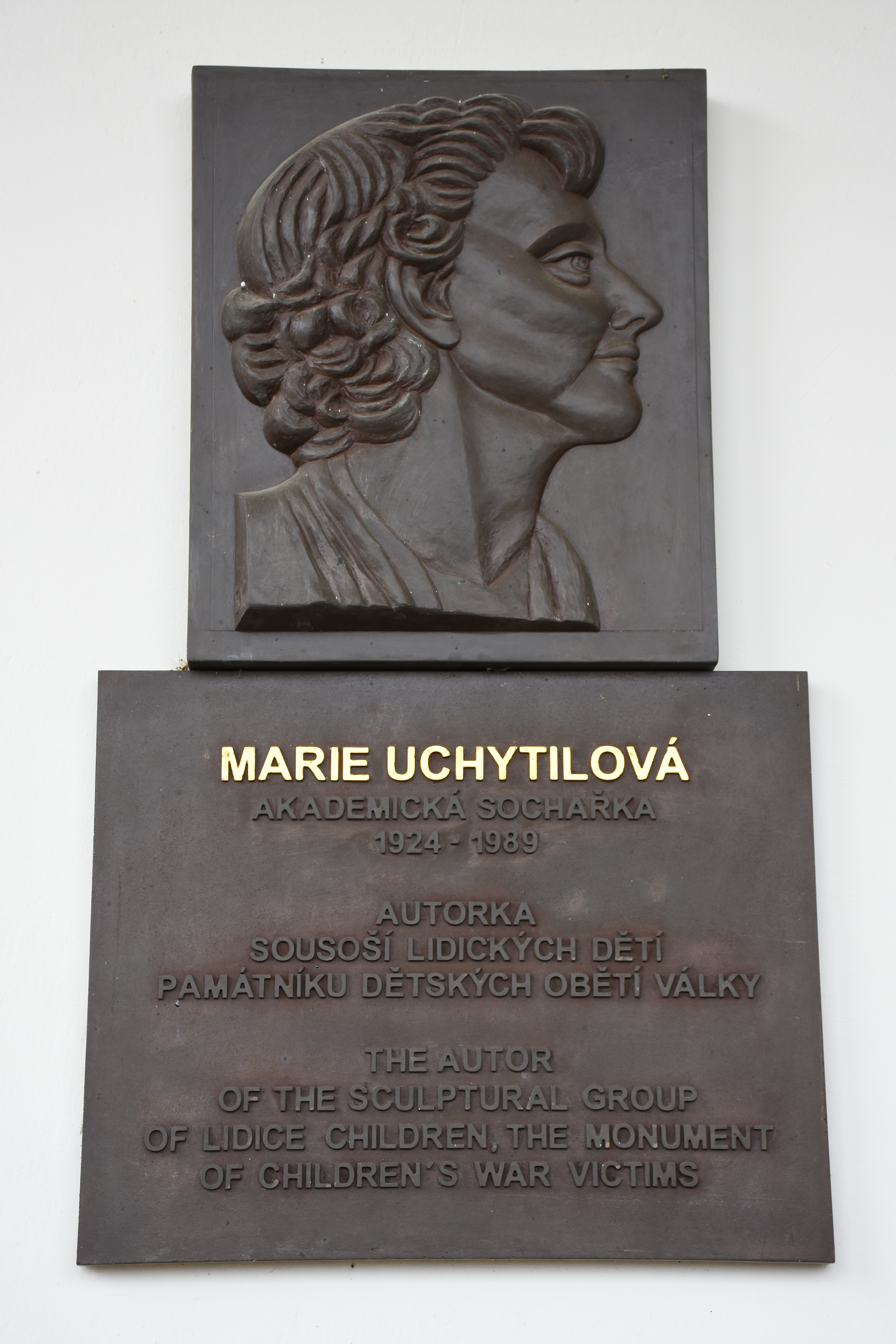
Memorial plaque

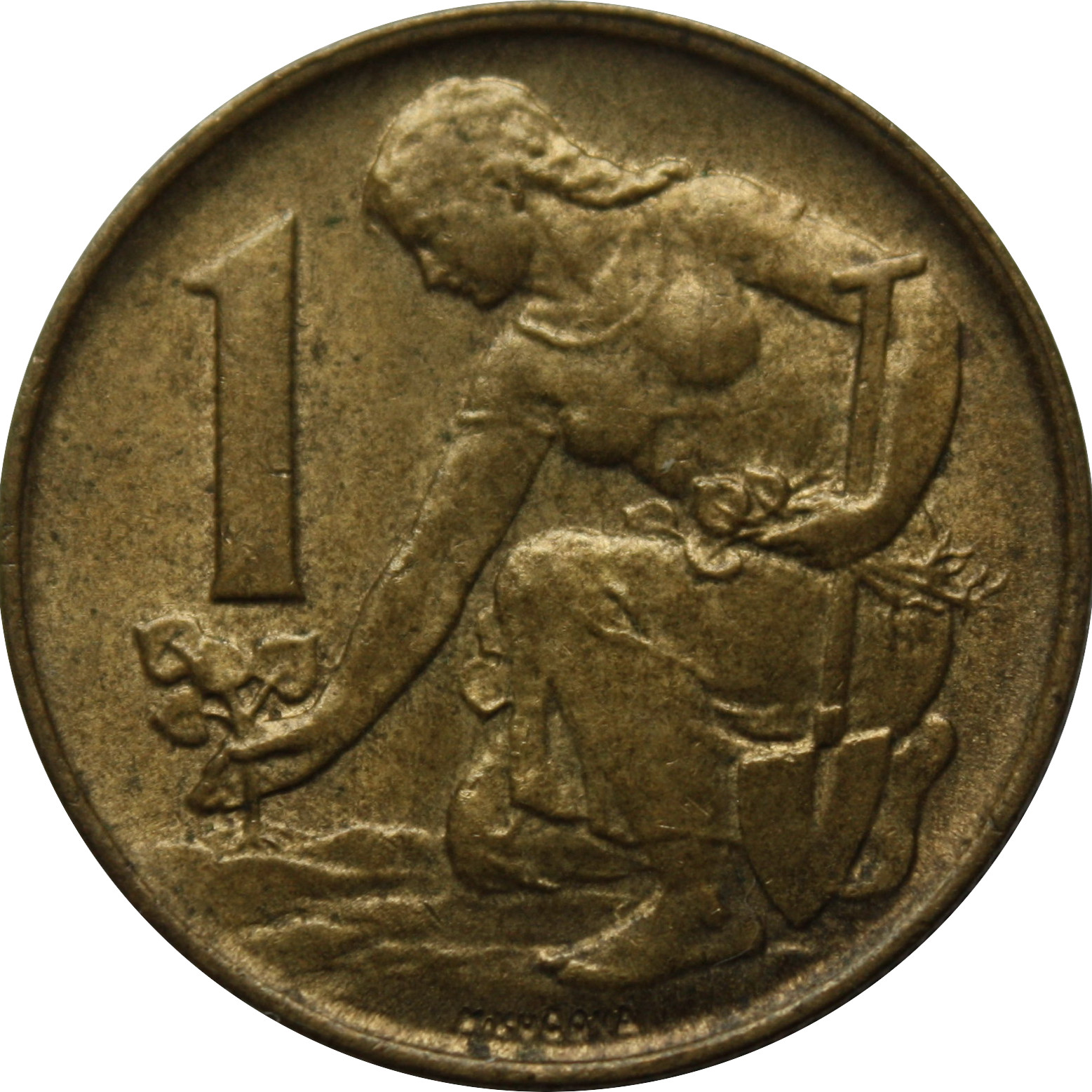
Czechoslovak one koruna, designed by Marie Uchytilová

Marie Uchytilová-Kučová (17 January 1924 – 16 November 1989) was a Czech sculptor and medalist. She created the Memorial to the Children Victims of the War in Lidice and designed the Czechoslovak one koruna coin that circulated from 1957 to 1993.

== Biography ==
Uchytilová was born in Kralovice, Czechoslovakia, the daughter of a clerk. From 1945 to 1950 she studied under Otakar Španiel at the Prague Academy of Fine Arts. In 1956 she won a public competition to design the Czechoslovak one crown coin, secretly basing the figure of a young woman on a current prisoner held by the Czech Communist government.

Uchytilová-Kučová was a teacher at Prague’s Václav Hollar Art School in Prague 3. Uchytilová died in Prague on 16 November 1989, at the age of 65.

== Memorial to the Children Victims of the War ==
In the late 1960s, on her own initiative, Uchytilová and her husband, Jiří V. Hampl, began working on a Memorial to the Children of Lidice, a Czech village destroyed by the Nazis during World War II. The memorial depicts 82 children killed in the extermination camp in the Polish town of Chełmno. Uchytilová decided not to portray the actual children of the town because she intended to commemorate all children who had become victims of the war. When Uchytilová died in 1989—the day before the 17 November Velvet Revolution—her work remained unrealized. In the 1990s, the Danish city of Albertslund and other—mostly foreign—investors donated money to cast the sculpture in bronze. The first thirty statues were installed in Lidice in 1995, and the last were dedicated on 10 June 2000, thirty years after Uchytilová began her work and eleven years after her death. The sculptures of the children overlook the mass graves at Lidice.

In 2013, the Czech President Miloš Zeman called it "the most beautiful and saddest memorial I've ever seen," and he conferred on Uchytilová a posthumous award.

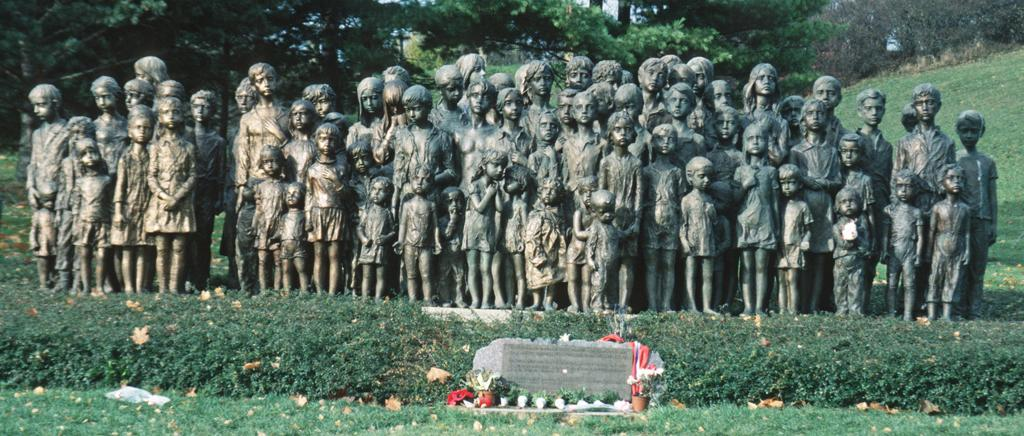

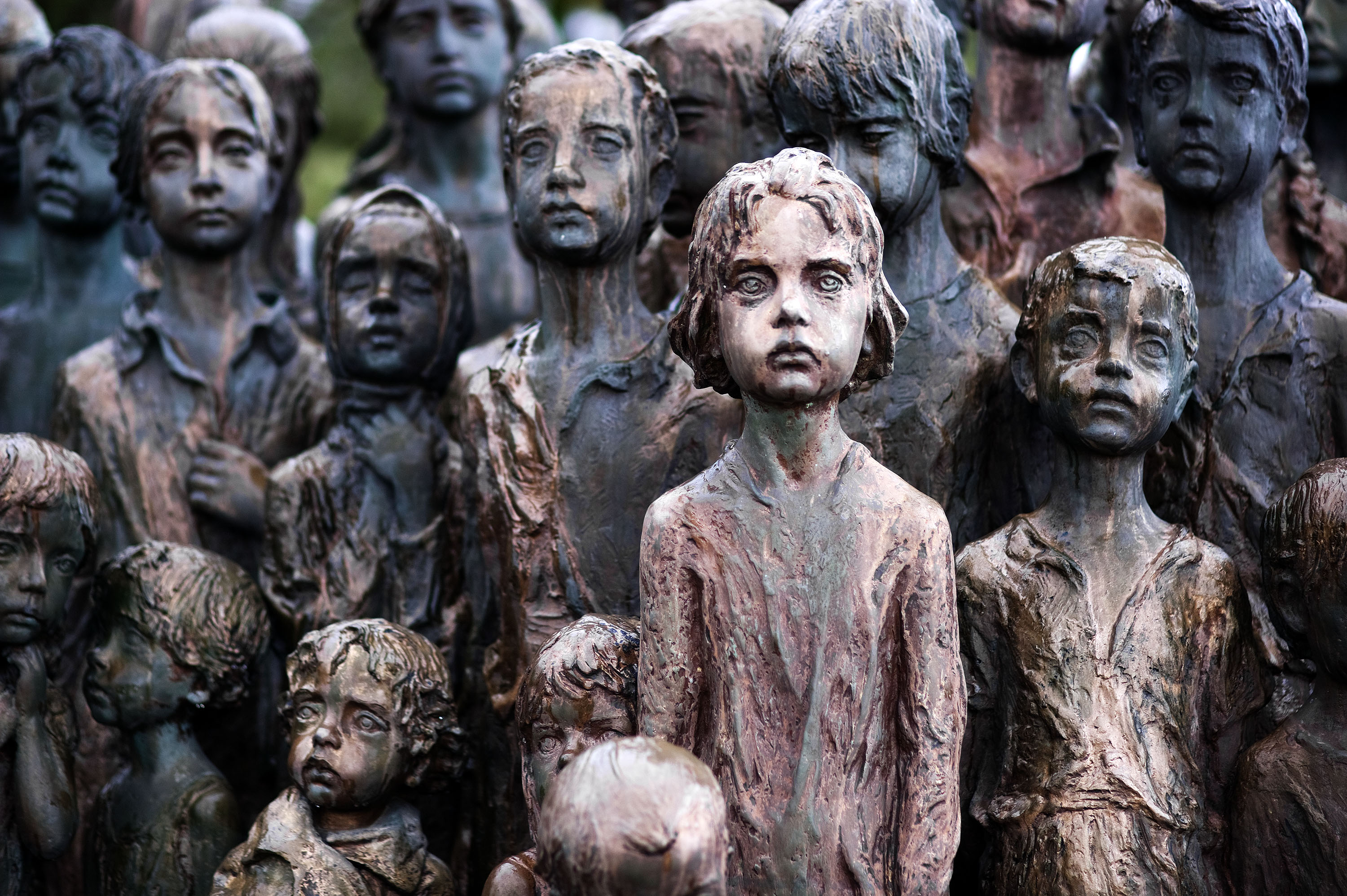
Lidice memorial (detail)
