= Lidice =

- Municipality
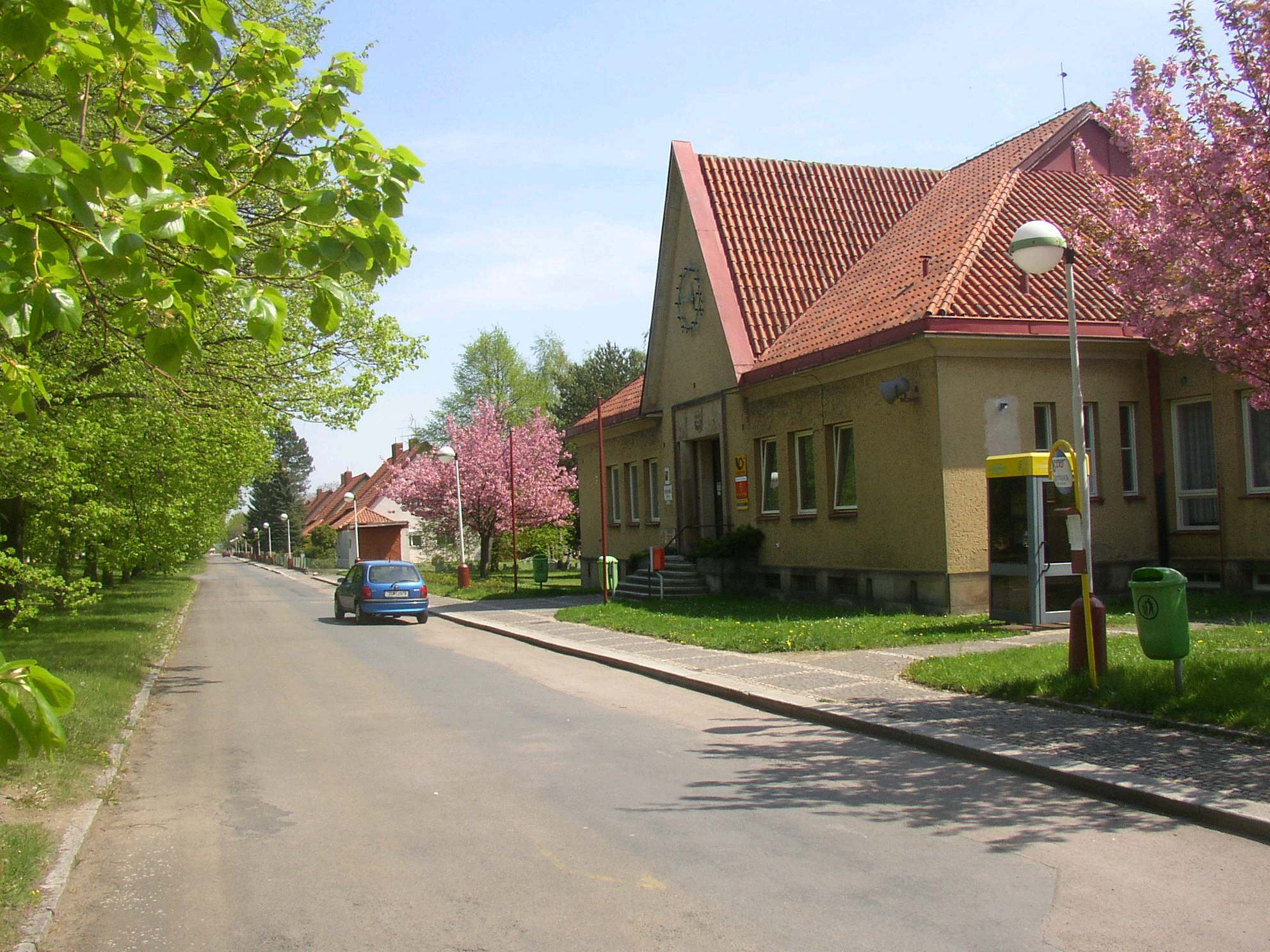
- Municipal office

- Flag Coat of arms

- Location in the Czech Republic
- Coordinates: 50°8′37″N 14°11′25″E
- Country: Czech Republic
- Region: Central Bohemian
- District: Kladno
- First mentioned: 1318

Area
  - Total: 4.75 km^{2} (1.83 sq mi)
- Elevation: 343 m (1,125 ft)

Population (2026-01-01)
  - Total: 552
  - Density: 116/km^{2} (301/sq mi)
- Time zone: UTC+1 (CET)
  - Summer (DST): UTC+2 (CEST)
- Postal code: 273 54
- Website: www.obec-lidice.cz

Lidice (Czech pronunciation: [lɪɟɪtsɛ]; German: Liditz) is a municipality and village in Kladno District in the Central Bohemian Region of the Czech Republic. It has about 600 inhabitants.

Lidice is built near the site of the previous village, which was completely destroyed on 10 June 1942 on orders from Adolf Hitler and acting Reichsprotektor Kurt Daluege in reprisal for the assassination of acting Reich Protector Reinhard Heydrich.

== Etymology ==
The name is derived from the personal name Lída (in old Czech written as Ľúda), meaning "the village of Lída's people". The personal name is a shortened form of the female name Ludmila/Lidmila, but it also became a surname.

== Geography ==
Lidice is located about 4 kilometres (2 mi) east of Kladno and 12 km (7 mi) northwest of Prague. It lies in a flat agricultural landscape in the Prague Plateau.

== History ==
The first written mention of Lidice is from 1318, in a chronicle written by Peter of Zittau. For centuries, Lidice was an agricultural village, which belonged to the Buštěhrad estate and shared its owners. After the industrialisation of the area in the second half of the 19th century, many of the inhabitants of Lidice worked in mines and steelworks in neighbouring Kladno and Slaný.

Lidice was chosen as a target for reprisals in the wake of the assassination of Reinhard Heydrich, because its residents were suspected of harbouring local resistance partisans, and were falsely associated with aiding team members of Operation Anthropoid. On 10 June 1942, 172 boys and men between age 14 to 84 were shot. Altogether, about 340 people from Lidice were murdered in the German reprisal (192 men, 60 women and 88 children). The village was set on fire and the remains of the buildings destroyed with explosives. After the war ended, only 153 women and 17 children returned. They were rehoused in a new village of Lidice that was built overlooking the original site, using money raised by the Lidice Shall Live campaign, initiated by Sir Barnett Stross and based in north Staffordshire in the United Kingdom. The new village was built in 1947–1949.

Evidence of the massacre, including Nazi propaganda films, was shown at the Nuremberg Trials as a demonstration of the Nazi regime's violence. This included testimony from two of the surviving children, who were forcibly re-housed as part of the adoption process of Germanisation.

== Demographics ==
Historical population

Year	Pop.	±%
1869	282	—
1880	346	+22.7%
1890	406	+17.3%
1900	431	+6.2%
1910	414	−3.9%

Year	Pop.	±%
1921	427	+3.1%
1930	446	+4.4%
1950	149	−66.6%
1961	478	+220.8%
1970	507	+6.1%

Year	Pop.	±%
1980	509	+0.4%
1991	449	−11.8%
2001	428	−4.7%
2011	427	−0.2%
2021	535	+25.3%

Source: Censuses

== Transport ==
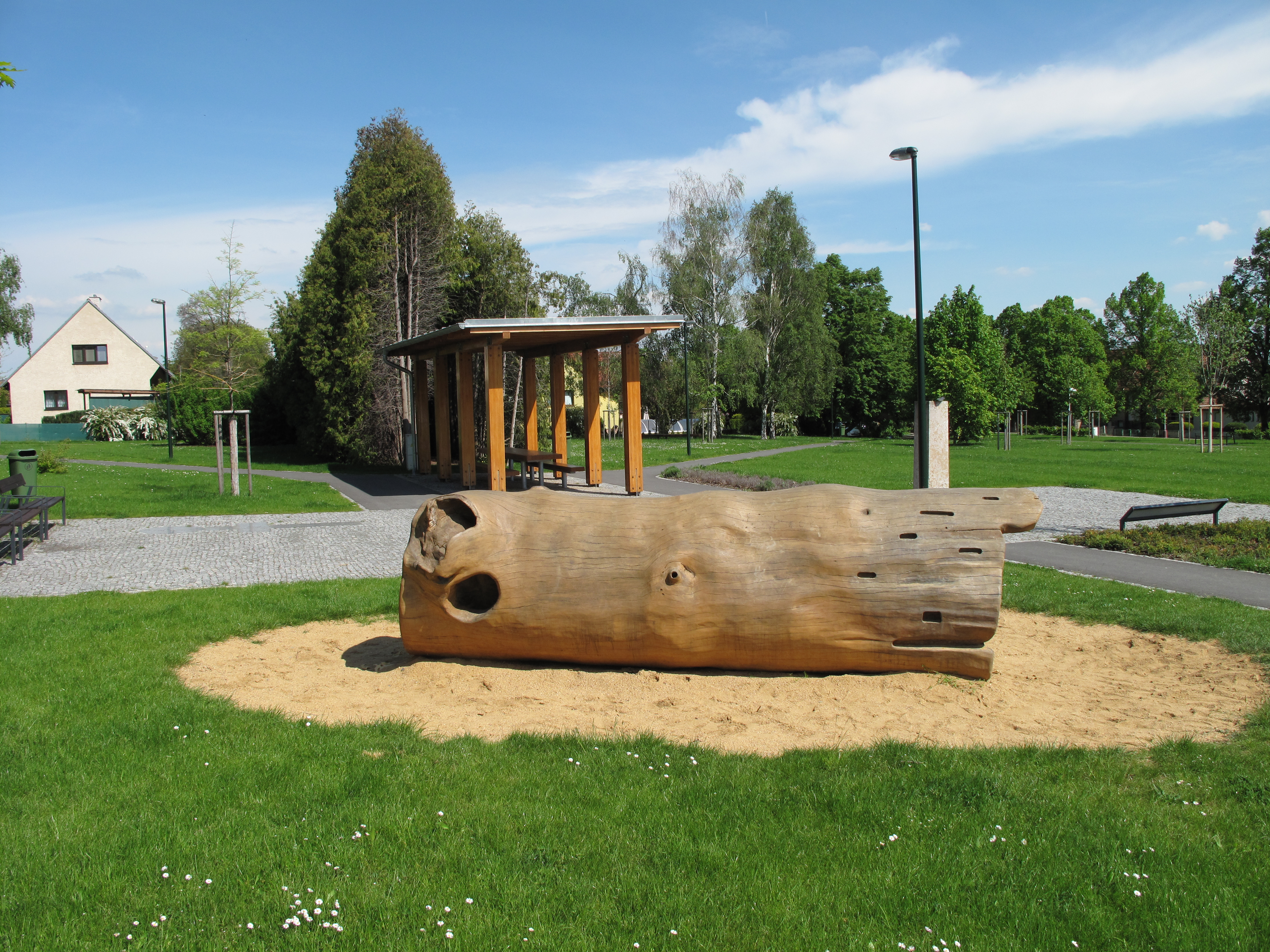
Park in the centre of Lidice

The I/61 road that connects Kladno with the D7 motorway runs along the northern municipal border.

== Culture ==
An art gallery, which displays permanent and temporary exhibitions, is in the new village 500 metres (1,600 ft) from the museum. The International Children's Exhibition of Fine Arts Lidice is an annual children's art competition that attracts entries from around the world. The exhibition was established in 1973.

== Sights ==
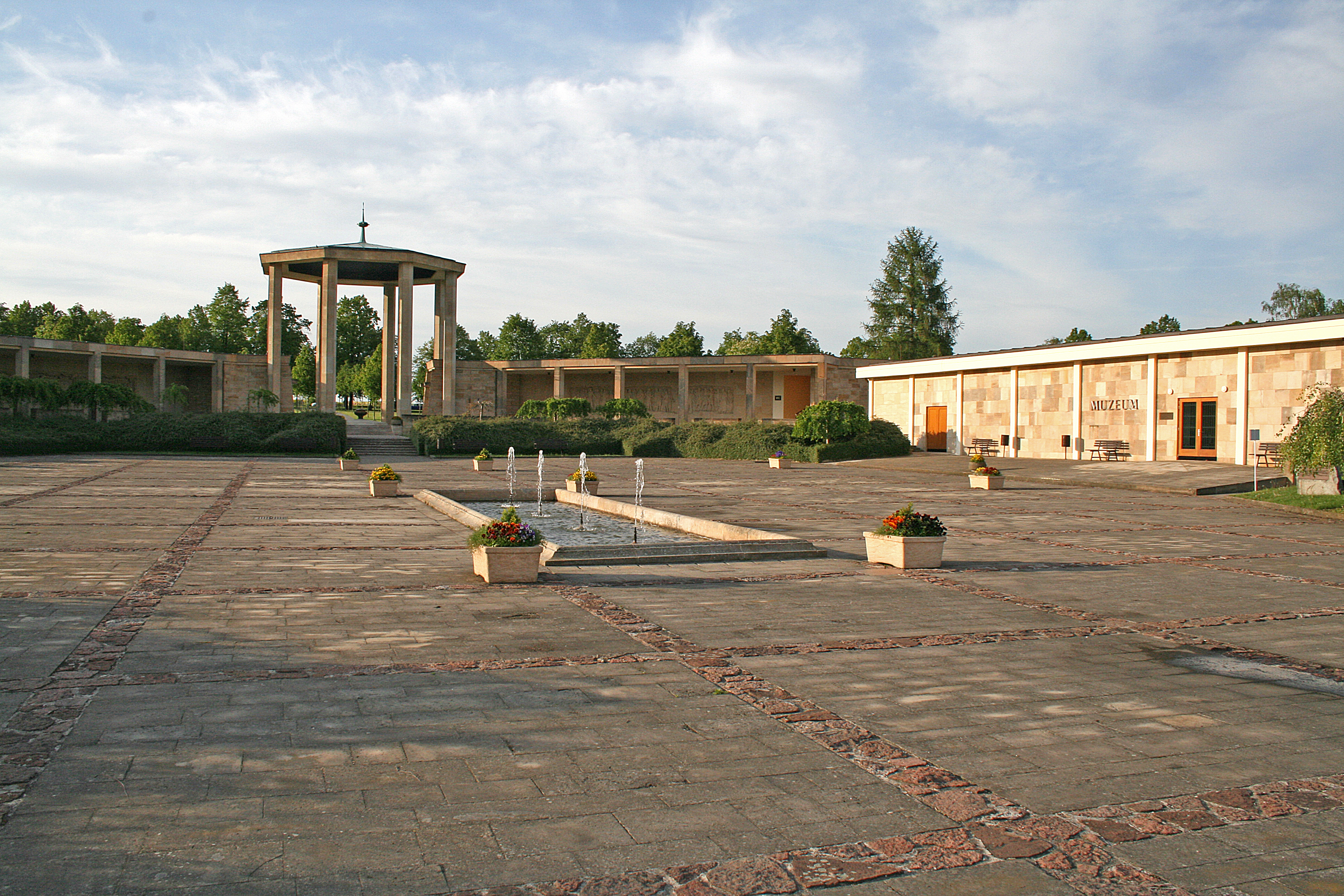
Lidice Memorial, with gloriette and museum

The most important monument is the Lidice Memorial. It was built in 1946–1962 by a collective of architects led by František Marek. It is an architecturally modified landscape in the area of the original village of Lidice with the fragments of burnt buildings, a gloriette, several monuments (including the Memorial to the Child Victims of War), a cemetery and the Rose Garden. In the eastern part of the memorial is a building that houses a museum. The area is protected as a national cultural monument.

== In culture ==
In 1942, poet Edna St. Vincent Millay published The Murder of Lidice, a dramatic poem commissioned by the Writers' War Board in the United States.

Between September and December 1942 documentarist Humphrey Jennings filmed a drama documentary for the Crown Film Unit called The Silent Village, using amateur actors from a Welsh mining village, Cwmgiedd, near the small South Wales town of Ystradgynlais. The film, which opens with a title card outlining the story of the Lidice massacre, was released to acclaim the following year.

In 1943, the Czech composer Bohuslav Martinů wrote the musical work Memorial to Lidice.

In 1943, the British author Gerald Kersh lightly fictionalized the massacre in the short novel The Dead Look On.

In 2017, to mark the 75th anniversary of the tragedy, the English composer Vic Carnall wrote his Opus 17, In Memoriam: the Village of Lidice (Czechoslovakia / June 1942), a work for solo piano.

In recent years numerous films have highlighted the events of the village's razing in 1942. The films Operation Daybreak (1975), Lidice (2011), and Anthropoid (2015) all detail the assassination of Reinhard Heydrich and the subsequent massacre and razing of the village.

== Legacy ==
In remembrance of the Lidice massacre, many neighbourhoods adopted the name Lidice in the years after the tragedy, and memorials were built. Notable examples include Lídice in Panama, San Jerónimo Lídice in Mexico, Lídice neighbourhood in La Pastora Parish of Caracas, Venezuela, Nova Lídice settlement in Medeiros Neto, Brazil, Lidice Memorial in Phillips, Wisconsin, Lidice Memorial Park in Crest Hill, Illinois, Plazuela Lidice town square in Montevideo, Uruguay, Lidic street in Santiago, Chile, Liditse street in Aşağı Ağcakənd, Azerbaijan, Lidice Way in Stoke-on-Trent, England, and others.

== Twin towns – sister cities ==
Lidice is twinned with:

- Coventry, England, United Kingdom A pedestrianised shopping area in Coventry is named Lidice Place.
- Marzabotto, Italy There is the Marzabottská street in Lidice.
