= Nathan E. Lane =

American politician

Nathan E. Lane (September 8, 1862 – 1948) was a member of the Wisconsin State Assembly.

Lane was born in Waushara County, Wisconsin.

== Career ==
Lane was elected to the Assembly in 1900 and was re-elected in 1902. Previously, he had served as Treasurer and Mayor of Phillips, Wisconsin. He was a Republican. He died in 1948.
