= Kralovice =

- Town
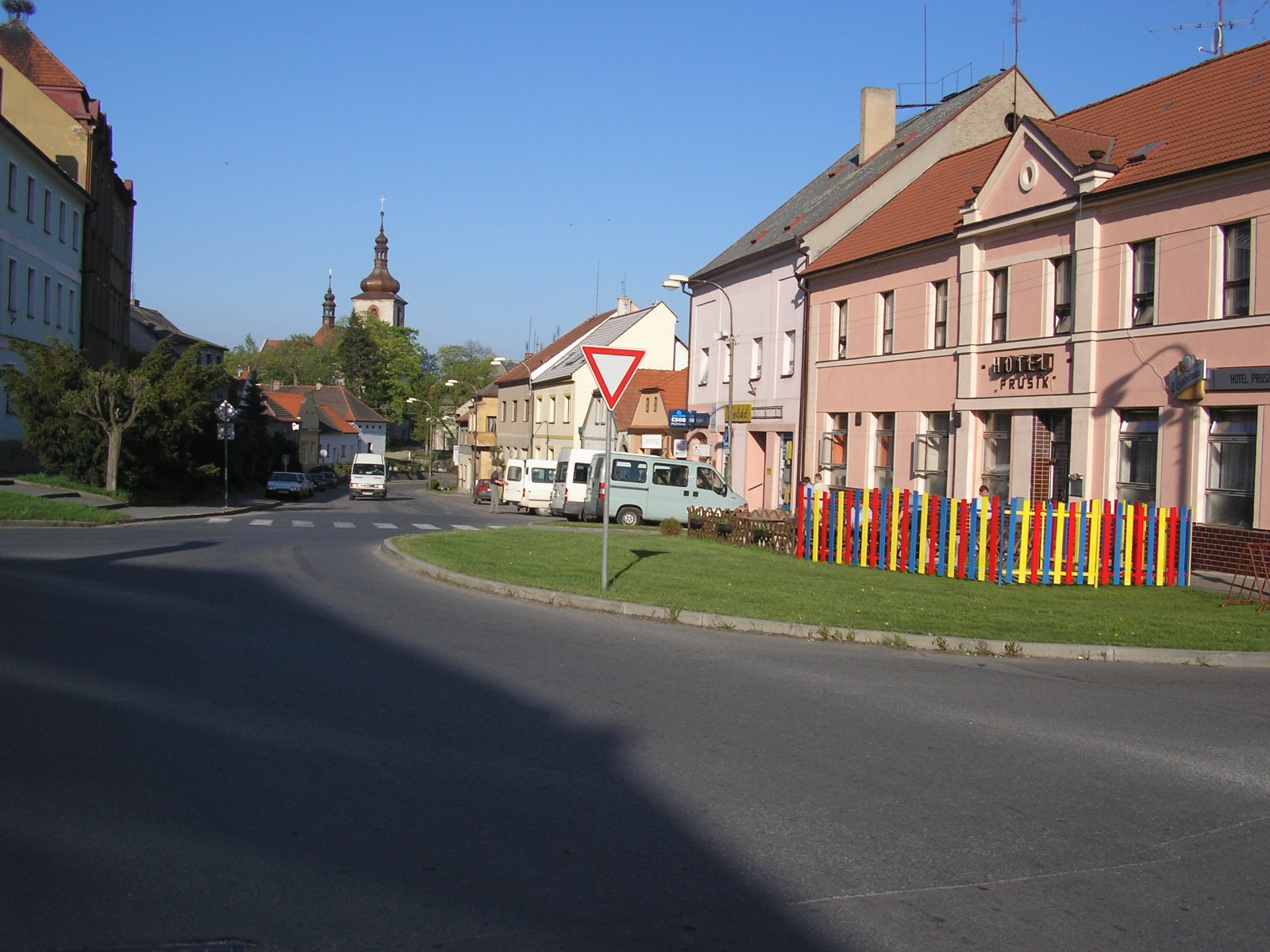
- Town square

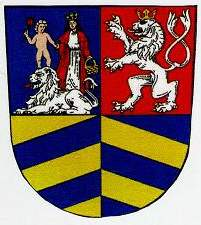
- Coat of arms

- Location in the Czech Republic
- Coordinates: 49°58′48″N 13°29′9″E
- Country: Czech Republic
- Region: Plzeň
- District: Plzeň-North
- First mentioned: 1183

Government
  - Mayor: Karel Popel

Area
  - Total: 39.80 km^{2} (15.37 sq mi)
- Elevation: 435 m (1,427 ft)

Population (2026-01-01)
  - Total: 3,450
  - Density: 86.7/km^{2} (225/sq mi)
- Time zone: UTC+1 (CET)
  - Summer (DST): UTC+2 (CEST)
- Postal code: 331 41
- Website: www.kralovice.cz

Kralovice (Czech pronunciation: [ˈkralovɪtsɛ]; German: Kralowitz) is a town in Plzeň-North District in the Plzeň Region of the Czech Republic. It has about 3,500 inhabitants. The town is known for the former pilgrimage site of Mariánská Týnice.

== Administrative division ==
Kralovice consists of six municipal parts (in brackets population according to the 2021 census):

- Kralovice (3,080)
- Bukovina (65)
- Hradecko (137)
- Mariánský Týnec (31)
- Řemešín (22)
- Trojany (45)

== Etymology ==
The name is probably derived from the Czech word král (i.e. 'king'), meaning "the village of king's people". It denoted a village founded on land belonging to the king. There is also a theory that the name was derived from the surname Král, meaning "the village of Král's people".

== Geography ==
Kralovice is located about 25 kilometres (16 mi) west of Plzeň. The southern part of the municipal territory with the town proper lies in the Plasy Uplands. The northern part lies in the Rakovník Uplands. The highest point is a hill at 573 m (1,880 ft) above sea level. The stream Kralovický potok flows through the town. There are several small ponds around the town.

== History ==
The first written mention of Kralovice is from 1183, when Duke Frederick donated it to the Cistertican monastery in Plasy. Between 1432 and 1543, the village was divided into two parts with different owners. The Gryspek family acquired both parts of Kralovice in 1543. In 1547, Kralovice gained coat of arms and became a town.

In 1623, the prosperties of the Gryspeks were confiscated as a result of the Battle of White Mountain and the town became again a property of the monastery. During the Thirty Years' War, half of the town was destroyed. The Plasy Monastery was abolished in 1785 and Kralovice was from then administered by a religious fund. In 1826, Klemens von Metternich bought Kralovice. The historic centre of the town was badly damaged by the 1845 fire and many houses had to be renovated.

Until 1918, the town was part of Austria-Hungary, head of the district of the same name, one of the 94 Bezirkshauptmannschaften in Bohemia.

== Demographics ==
Historical population

Year	Pop.	±%
1869	2,883	—
1880	2,773	−3.8%
1890	2,773	+0.0%
1900	2,873	+3.6%
1910	2,836	−1.3%

Year	Pop.	±%
1921	2,818	−0.6%
1930	3,154	+11.9%
1950	2,718	−13.8%
1961	2,778	+2.2%
1970	3,081	+10.9%

Year	Pop.	±%
1980	3,224	+4.6%
1991	3,340	+3.6%
2001	3,490	+4.5%
2011	3,453	−1.1%
2021	3,380	−2.1%

Source: Censuses

== Transport ==
The I/27 road from Plzeň to Žatec runs through the town.

Kralovice is the final station of the railway line from Prague via Rakovník. Historic trains run on it and it is only in operation during the summer tourist season on weekends.

== Sights ==
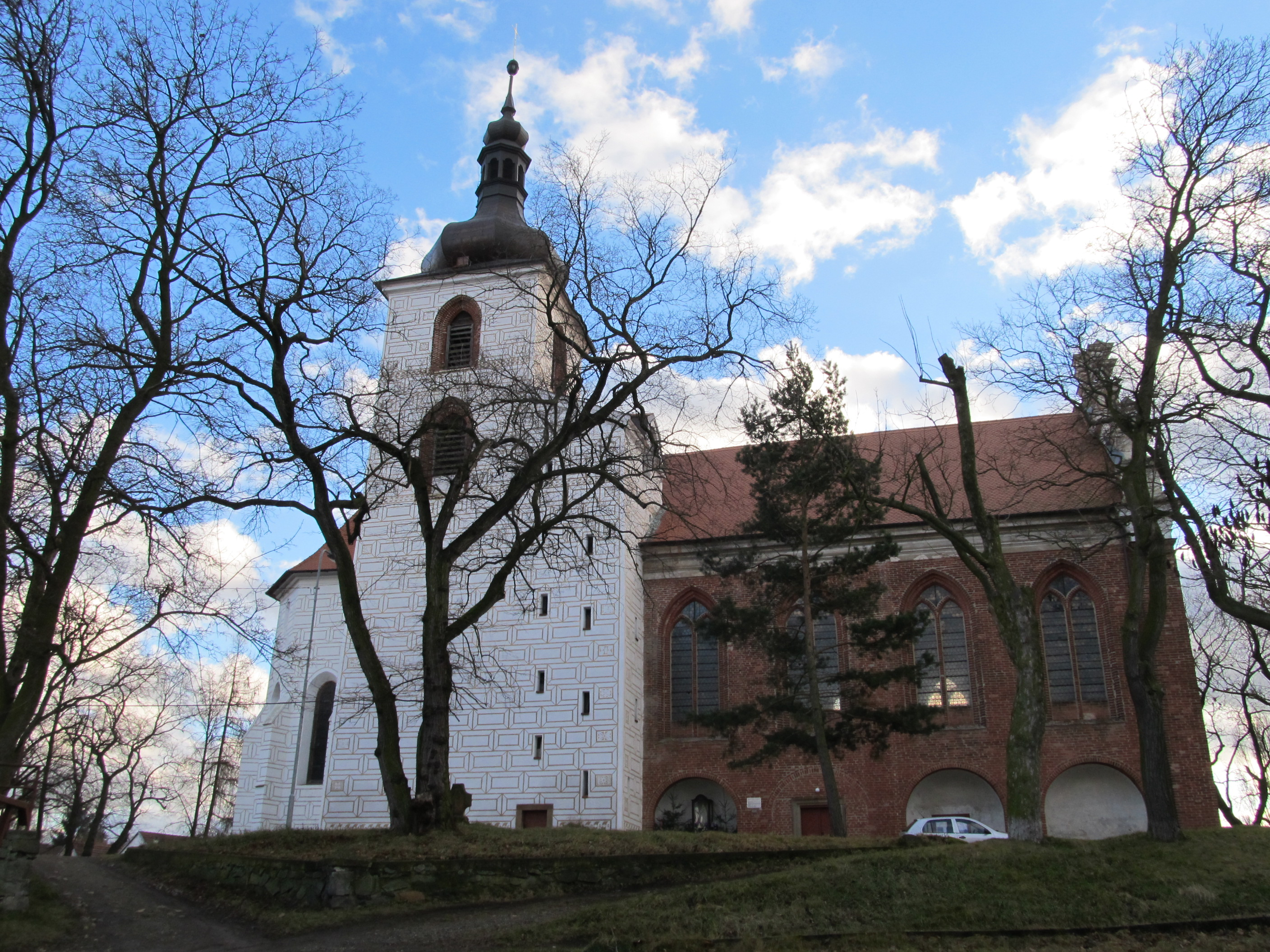
Church of Saints Peter and Paul

The main landmark of Kralovice is the Church of Saints Peter and Paul. The originally Gothic church from the mid-14th century was rebuilt in the late Renaissance style in 1575–1581. Its chapel dates from 1868.

The village of Mariánský Týnec is known for the former pilgrimage site of Mariánská Týnice. It is a Baroque complex formed by a monastery and the Church of the Annunciation. Today the monastery houses the Museum and Gallery of the Northern Plzeň Region.

== Notable people ==
- Isa Grégrová (1878–1962), actress
- Marie Uchytilová (1924–1989), sculptor
