= Mariánská Týnice =

Coordinates: 49°59′07″N 13°27′46″E

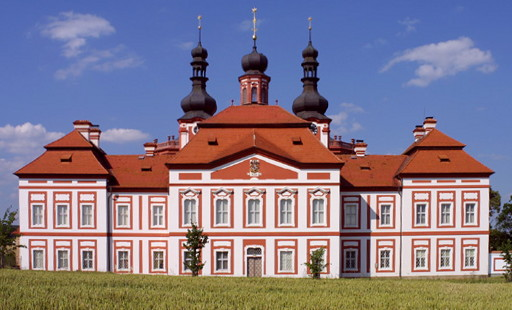
- Interactive map of the Mariánská Týnice area

General information
- Location: Mariánský Týnec, Czech Republic

Mariánská Týnice is a former pilgrimage site in Kralovice in the Czech Republic. It is a complex of a monastery with the Baroque Church of the Annunciation and the Cistercian provost office built by Jan Santini Aichel in the 18th century. Today the monastery houses the Museum and Gallery of the Northern Plzeň Region.

== History of the pilgrimage site ==
In the 12th century the village of Mariánský Týnec near Kralovice belonged to a man called Roman. He was ill and without children, and he promised that if he were healed he would build a chapel dedicated to the Virgin Mary. They recovered and he kept his promise. In circa 1180 (or 1230) he bequeathed his property to the Cistercian monastery in Plasy.

The monks of Plasy built a court around the chapel where they worked. People started to visit the site from far and wide and Pope Urban III granted the chapel special indulgence for the pilgrims in 1186, which was confirmed by Innocent IV in 1250. It became the oldest pilgrimage site in Western Bohemia.

There are no subsequent records of the site until the Hussite Wars when the Plasy region was badly plundered. In the 16th century most of the property of the Plasy monastery was sold to Florian Griespek von Griespach.

Legal disputes between the monks and the House of Griespek were ended in 1613 when king Matthias returned the site in Mariánská Týnice to the Cistercians. The Griespeks lost all their property due to confiscation after the battle of White Mountain and so the monastery in Plasy was returned to the monks as well (through the intercession of Jaroslav Bořita of Martinice) and Mariánská Týnice became part of the property of the monastery. During the Thirty Years' War when all Bohemia suffered from boundless pillage, Týnec survived with no harm, which was ascribed to the protection of the Virgin Mary.

The new abbot of Plasy, Jakob Berger Vrchota of Rosenwerth, fell ill in 1638 and entrusted his life to the hands of the Virgin Mary of Týnice with a promise to improve the site if he were healed. After recovery he built a larger church with two altars (St. Joachim and St. Anne) and put a new picture of the Virgin Mary inside.

The site was visited by more and more pilgrims, and so a new bigger church was built in 1681 when Ondřej Trojer was the abbot of Plasy. A painting of Our Lady of Sorrows was brought from Rome by Jan Karel of Unwerth and two other altars were founded (St. Bernard and Fourteen Holy Helpers). Abbot Trojer set up the provost office in Týnice in 1699 and donated his own homestead in Kralovice and 12,000 guldens.

In 1711 Abbot Eugen Tittl, who started to rebuild the monastery in Plasy, also laid the cornerstone of a completely new church and provost office near the site of the existing church. The work on the new building was disrupted in the war times during the rule of Maria Theresa, and the interior was not completed and consecrated until 1777 when the old church was pulled down. In 1785 the church was closed by the reform of Joseph II and the equipment was liquidated.

The last Mass in the church was celebrated on 7 August 1786. In 1826 Týnec was bought by Prince Metternich. In 1894, when the convent in Plasy was destroyed by fire, material was taken from Týnice to repair it. The provost office served as a gamekeeper's lodge. The building was falling into disrepair, and in 1920 the dome and some vaults caved in.

In 1919 a volunteer organization was established in Plzeň to find help for reconstruction of the ruin. Architect Hanuš Zápal published a book in 1921 which initiated serious interest in the monument among a lot of people. The church without the dome was fixed, and in 1952 a new museum was established in it. In 2005 the dome was built and the building became the seat of the Museum and Gallery of the Northern Plzeň Region.

== Church ==
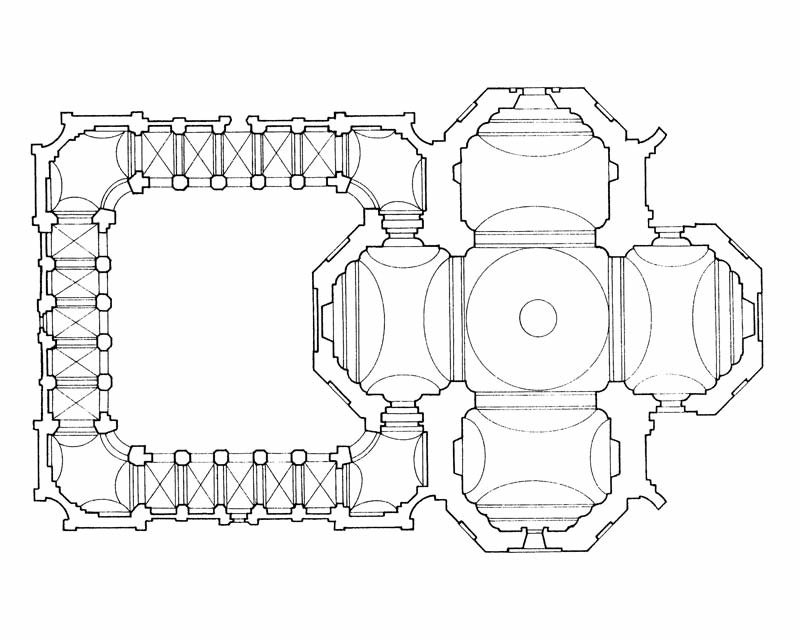
Grand plan of the church with the ambulatory

The project was said to be sketched by Kilian Ignaz Dientzenhofer. The confirmed project architect was Jan Santini Aichel who also realized it. The axis is directed toward Plasy, and so the orientation of the church is not to the east but the southwest. The ceiling of the dome was decorated with a fresco of the Madonna by Siard František Nosecký in c. 1750. The main altar by Ignác František Platzer was divided and transported to other churches; the largest part with the statues of Saints Joachim and Anna is in the Church of Saint James the Great in Příbram, kneeling angels are in Kralovice (two of them in Plzeň), and the organ and pulpit are in the church in Žebrák. Only an illusive altar painted on the wall with the emblem of the last abbot of Plasy Celestin Werner remains. The silver statue of the Annunciation, sculptured in 1726 in Augsburg on the order of Abbot Eugen Tittl, was melted for coins as well as the church's silver treasure. The ambulatory is decorated with frescos from the life of Madonna by František Julius Lux. In the corner chapels of the ambulatory there are high quality paintings, probably by Josef Kramolín (the painter of the illusive altar).

== Provost office ==
The building was completed in 1764 when Fortunát Hartmann was the abbot of Plasy. The refectory is decorated with two ceiling paintings – one depicts the legend about Roman of Týnice, and in the other the Madonna serves Cistercians with herbs. There are also wall paintings, and portraits of twelve abbots and pictures of the monasteries in Plasy and Mariánská Týnice.

== List of the provosts ==
- Bedřich Chobodides, born in Vlašim (1699–1702)
- Edmund Fabricius, born in Lužice (1703–1710)
- Bernard Opicius, born in Prague (1710–1715)
- Ferdinand Mayer, born in Louny (1716–1734)
- Řehoř Guldenfess, born in Olomouc (1734–1744)
- Julius de Stern-Legisfeld, born in Kutná Hora (1745–1755)
- Marcel Krska, born in Prague (1755–1775)
- Raymund Ender, born in Chomutov (15 January 1776 – 26 November 1776)
- Michael Kottik, born in Křivoklát (1777–1785)

== Name ==
The name Mariánská Týnice (feminine) and Mariánský Týnec (masculine) have been used variably in history. The modern practice uses Mariánský Týnec for the village nearby and Mariánská Týnice for the cultural monument.
