= Lidice Memorial =

WWII memorial in Phillips, Wisconsin, US

- U.S. National Register of Historic Places
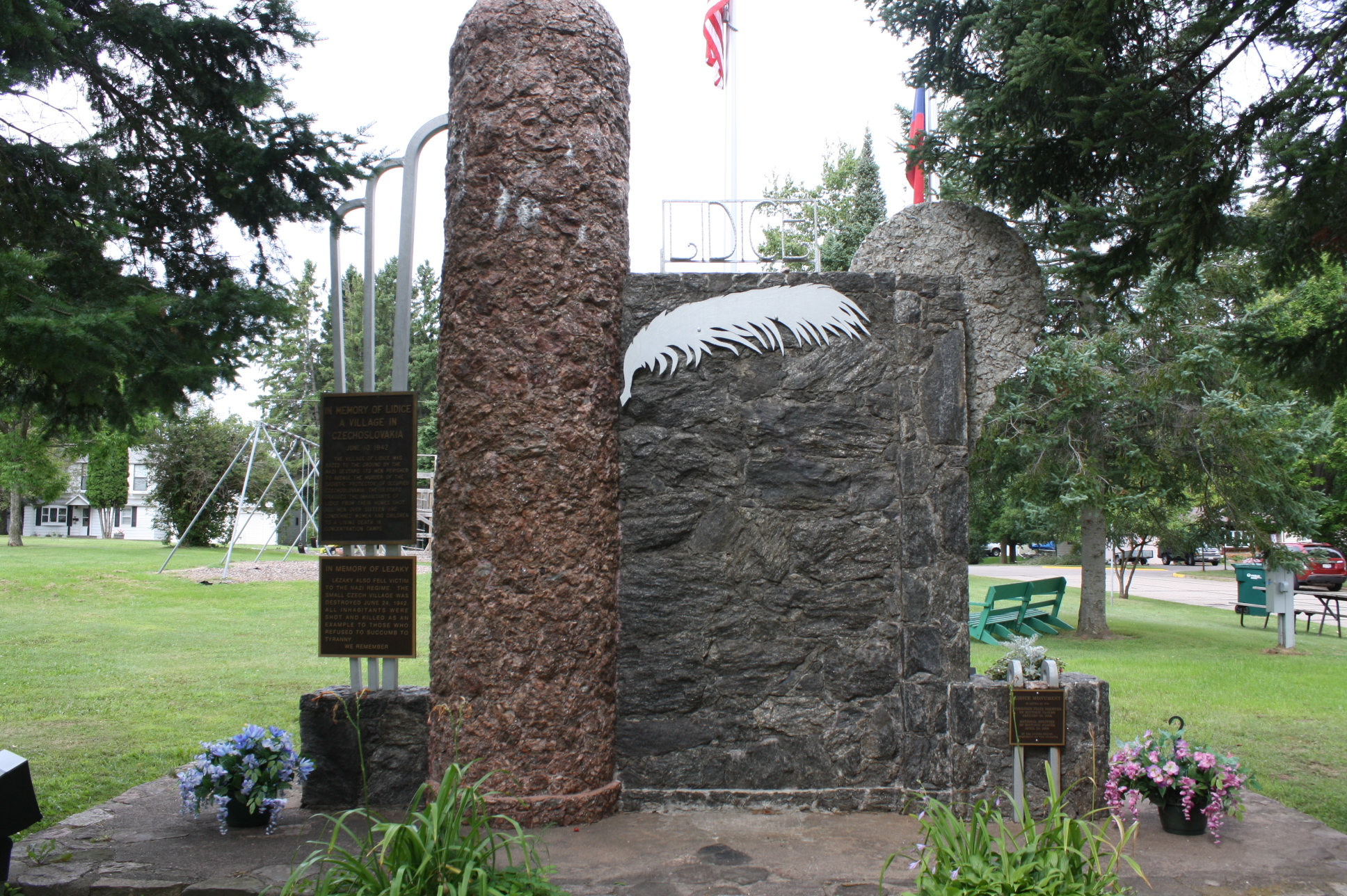
- Location: Phillips, Wisconsin
- Built: 1944
- Architect: Vaclav Hajny
- Architectural style: Art Deco
- NRHP reference No.: 06000301
- Added to NRHP: April 19, 2006

The Lidice Memorial is a monument to the Lidice massacre perpetrated by Nazi Germany in the Protectorate of Bohemia and Moravia during the Second World War.

The memorial was added to the National Register of Historic Places in 2006.

== History ==
The Lidice Memorial serves as a tribute to the village of Lidice in Czechoslovakia. In 1942, the village was destroyed and nearly all of its citizens were killed or dispersed by the Ordnungspolizei of Nazi Germany in response to Operation Anthropoid, the assassination of Reinhard Heydrich. The monument, located in Sokol Park in the town of Phillips, Wisconsin, was erected in 1944.
