= Felix A. Kremer =

American farmer, lawyer, newspaper publisher, and politician

Felix A. Kremer (October 18, 1872 – January 11, 1940) was an American farmer, lawyer, newspaper publisher, and politician.

Born on a farm in Mount Carroll, Illinois, Kremer received his law degree from Northern Illinois University College of Law. From 1899 to 1916, Kremer practiced law in Madison, Wisconsin. He then moved to Phillips, Wisconsin, where he continued to practice law and owned a farm. Kremer served as district attorney and municipal judge for Price County, Wisconsin. He owned and published The Wisconsin Homestead, an agricultural newspaper. In 1937, Kremer served in the Wisconsin State Assembly and was a Progressive. Kremer died in a hospital in Madison, Wisconsin, in 1940.
