= Isa Grégrová =

Czech actress (1878–1962)

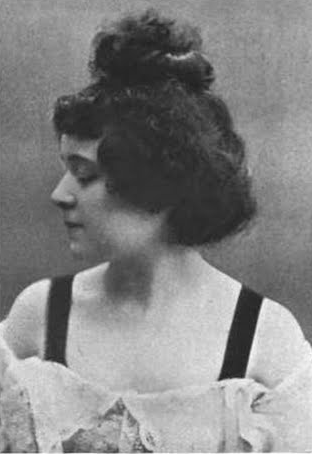
- Isa Grégrová, from a 1904 publication
- Born: Isabella Grögrová; 30 November 1878; Kralovice, Austria-Hungary
- Died: 23 March 1962 (aged 83); Vaduz, Liechtenstein
- Other names: Iza Hamerníková-Grégrová
- Occupation(s): Actress, educator

Iza Hamerníková-Grégrová (born Isabella Grögrová; 30 November 1878 – 23 March 1962), known as Isa Grégrová, was a Czech actress and teacher.

== Early life ==
Grégrová was born in Kralovice and lived in Domažlice, the daughter of Leopold Gröger and Marie Grögrová-Czenhausová. She studied acting with Otilie Sklenářová-Malá.

== Career ==
Grégrová was a member of the National Theatre company in Prague from 1895 to 1908. She played Shakespearean roles, and appeared as Hedvig in Ibsen's The Wild Duck in 1904, 1905, 1906, 1907, and 1921. She played Kassandra in a Prague production of Jaroslav Kvapil's Oresteia (1907). She appeared in one silent film, Tam na horách (1920).

After Grégrová retired from the stage, she taught acting and worked on Prague radio. She moved to Switzerland before World War II and eventually settled in Liechtenstein.

== Personal life ==
Grégrová retired from the Prague stage and married Josef Hamerník in 1908; a few weeks later, their son, also named Josef, was born in Berlin. Grégrová died in 1962, in Vaduz.
