= Phillips, Wisconsin =

City in the United States

- City
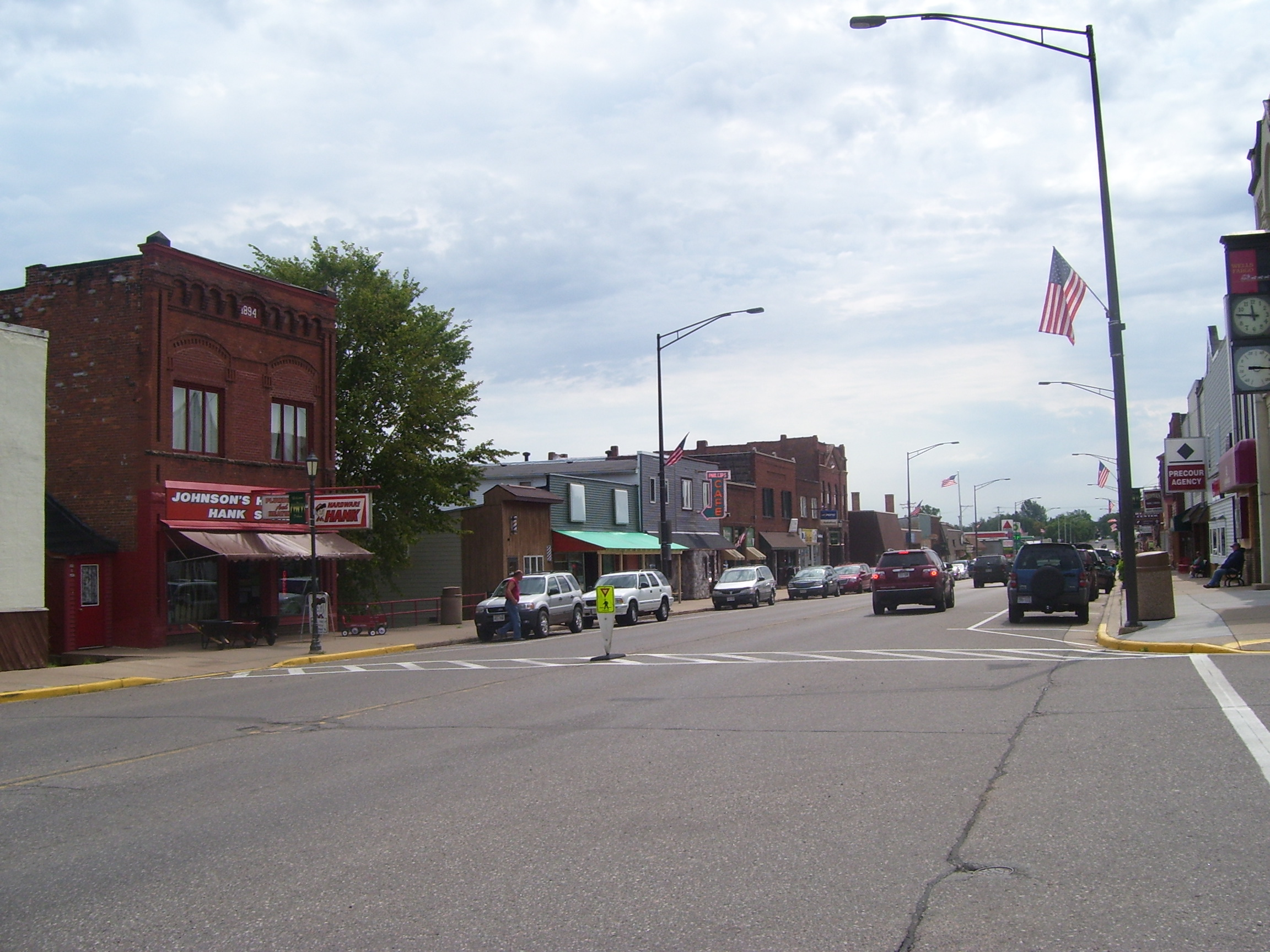

- Location of Phillips in Price County, Wisconsin

- Location within Wisconsin Location within the United States
- Coordinates: 45°41′30″N 90°24′7″W
- Country: United States
- State: Wisconsin
- County: Price

Area
  - Total: 3.34 sq mi (8.64 km^{2})
  - Land: 2.63 sq mi (6.81 km^{2})
  - Water: 0.71 sq mi (1.84 km^{2})
- Elevation: 1,444 ft (440 m)

Population (2020)
  - Total: 1,533
  - Density: 583/sq mi (225/km^{2})
- Time zone: UTC-6 (Central (CST))
  - Summer (DST): UTC-5 (CDT)
- Zip Code: 54555
- Area codes: 715 & 534
- FIPS code: 55-62450
- GNIS feature ID: 1571294
- Website: cityofphillips.com

Phillips is a city and the county seat of Price County, Wisconsin, United States. The population was 1,533 at the 2020 census.

== History ==
The town of Phillips was platted in 1876 and named after Elijah B. Phillips, the general manager of the Wisconsin Central Railway. It began as a logging town.

In the dry summer of 1894, a devastating fire spread from the southwest and destroyed the town. The population evacuated, and 13 people died in the blaze. The town was rebuilt and expanded in subsequent years, and a memorial to the disaster now stands on the shore of Lake Duroy.

=== "Wind Capital of Wisconsin" ===
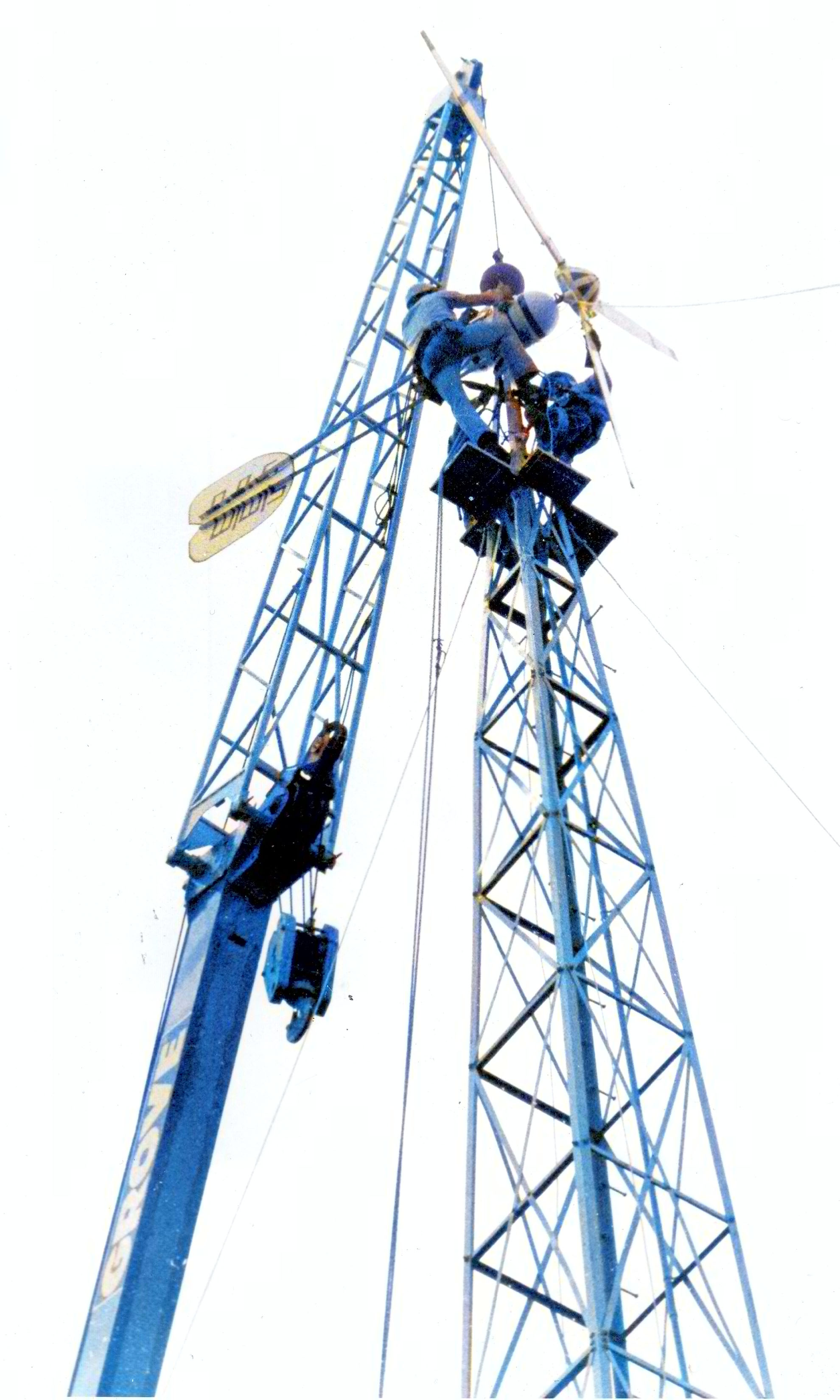
Lake Superior District Power Company assists WWS in Installation of Jacobs wind turbine on student reconstructed tower connected to the school, May 18, 1980.

Following a downburst wind storm of July 4, 1977, which destroyed approximately 850,000 acres of timber in Price County, Phillips High School students became active in renewable energy. In 1979, a student-led group was awarded a small U.S. Department of Energy (DOE) grant. In May 1980, the students, with the assistance of Lake Superior District Power Company, erected a wind turbine on the school grounds to generate electricity for the local grid. Phillips was declared the "Wind Capital of Wisconsin" by then Wisconsin Governor Lee S. Dreyfus.

== Geography ==
Phillips is located at 45°41′30″N 90°24′7″W (45.691560, -90.401915). It is on highway SR 13, 77 miles north of Marshfield, and 74 miles south of Ashland.

According to the United States Census Bureau, the city has a total area of 3.51 square miles (9.09 km^{2}), of which, 2.79 square miles (7.23 km^{2}) is land and 0.72 square miles (1.86 km^{2}) is water.

== Demographics ==
Historical population
Census	Pop.	Note	%±
1900	1,820		—
1910	1,948		7.0%
1920	1,973		1.3%
1930	1,901		−3.6%
1940	1,915		0.7%
1950	1,775		−7.3%
1960	1,524		−14.1%
1970	1,511		−0.9%
1980	1,522		0.7%
1990	1,592		4.6%
2000	1,675		5.2%
2010	1,478		−11.8%
2020	1,533		3.7%
U.S. Decennial Census

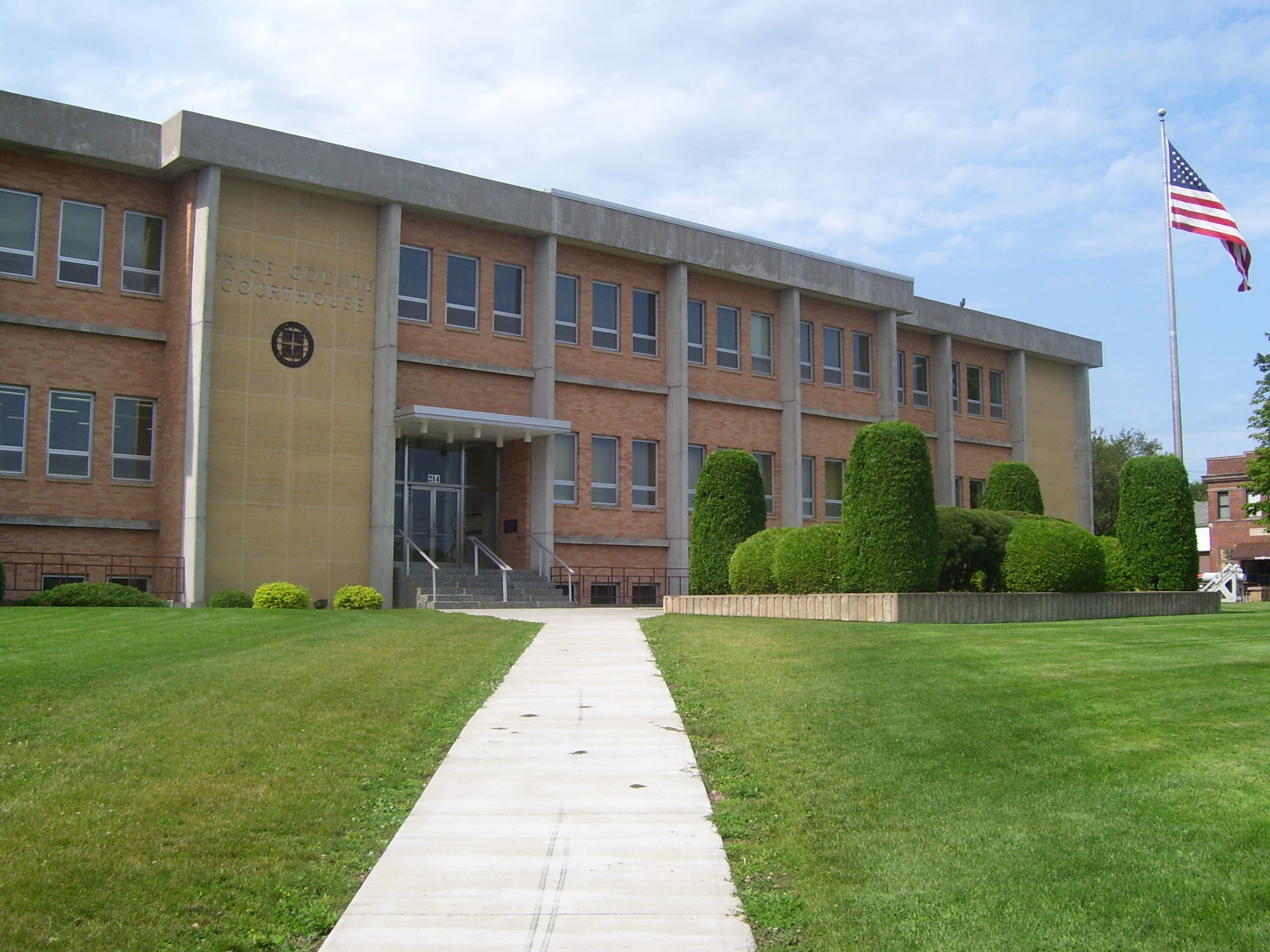
The Price County courthouse in Phillips

=== 2010 census ===
As of the census of 2010, there were 1,478 people, 695 households, and 338 families living in the city. The population density was 529.7 inhabitants per square mile (204.5/km^{2}). There were 868 housing units at an average density of 311.1 per square mile (120.1/km^{2}). The racial makeup of the city was 95.1% White, 0.7% African American, 0.7% Native American, 1.4% Asian, 0.1% Pacific Islander, 0.1% from other races, and 2.0% from two or more races. Hispanic or Latino people of any race were 1.5% of the population.

There were 695 households, of which 23.9% had children under the age of 18 living with them, 34.0% were married couples living together, 11.4% had a female householder with no husband present, 3.3% had a male householder with no wife present, and 51.4% were non-families. 45.0% of all households were made up of individuals, and 24.3% had someone living alone who was 65 years of age or older. The average household size was 2.00 and the average family size was 2.79.

The median age in the city was 44.8 years. 20.2% of residents were under the age of 18; 7.4% were between the ages of 18 and 24; 22.9% were from 25 to 44; 25.9% were from 45 to 64; and 23.6% were 65 years of age or older. The gender makeup of the city was 47.6% male and 52.4% female.

=== 2000 census ===
As of the census of 2000, there were 1,675 people, 721 households, and 395 families living in the city. The population density was 605.5 people per square mile (233.5/km^{2}). There were 839 housing units at an average density of 303.3 per square mile (116.9/km^{2}). The racial makeup of the city was 96.96% White, 1.19% Native American, 0.72% Asian, 0.12% from other races, and 1.01% from two or more races. Hispanic or Latino people of any race were 0.36% of the population.

There were 721 households, out of which 28.3% had children under the age of 18 living with them, 39.8% were married couples living together, 11.4% had a female householder with no husband present, and 45.1% were non-families. 39.8% of all households were made up of individuals, and 21.9% had someone living alone who was 65 years of age or older. The average household size was 2.14 and the average family size was 2.89.

In the city, the population was spread out, with 22.7% under the age of 18, 7.3% from 18 to 24, 24.1% from 25 to 44, 21.7% from 45 to 64, and 24.1% who were 65 years of age or older. The median age was 42 years. For every 100 females, there were 83.9 males. For every 100 females age 18 and over, there were 80.0 males.

The median income for a household in the city was $31,471, and the median income for a family was $38,889. Males had a median income of $32,333 versus $24,028 for females. The per capita income for the city was $16,480. About 7.2% of families and 12.5% of the population were below the poverty line, including 15.4% of those under age 18 and 21.4% of those age 65 or over.

== Government ==
Phillips is the county seat of Price County. The mayor is Charles Peterson.

=== Presidential election results ===
Year	Republican	Democratic	Third parties
2000	53.3% 390	43.3% 317	3.4% 25
2004	46.1% 380	52.9% 436	1.0% 8
2008	38.4% 266	60.0% 416	1.6% 11
2012	42.5% 291	55.9% 383	1.6% 11
2016	53.0% 329	41.9% 260	5.1% 32
2020	57.1% 408	41.0% 293	2.0% 14

== Transportation ==
=== Airport ===
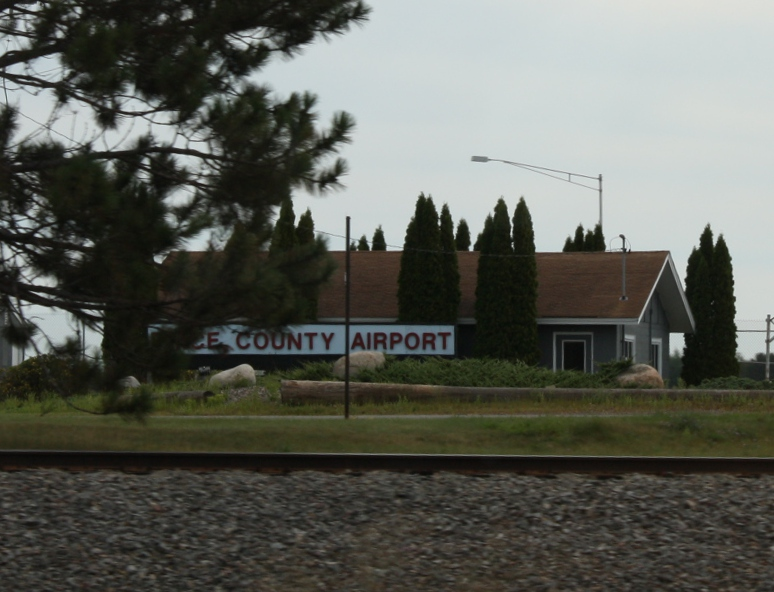
Price County Airport

Phillips is served by the Price County Airport (KPBH), located one mile northwest of the city. In 2023, the airport handled approximately 18,100 operations per year, almost 50 per day, with roughly 84% general aviation, 15% air taxi and 1% military. The airport has a 5,220 foot asphalt primary runway with approved GPS approaches (Runway 1-19) and a 3,951 foot asphalt crosswind runway (Runway 6-24), also with GPS approaches.

Bus service is provided by Bay Area Rural Transit.

== Notable people ==
- Adolph Bieberstein, NFL player
- Frank Boyle, Wisconsin State Representative
- Esther Bubley, photographer
- Clayton Hicks, Wisconsin State Senator
- Willis J. Hutnik, Wisconsin State Representative
- Felix A. Kremer, Wisconsin State Representative
- Nathan E. Lane, Wisconsin State Representative
- Chuck Mencel, NBA basketball player, 1955 Big Ten Conference MVP
- John W. Slaby, Wisconsin State Representative
- Vincent J. Zellinger, Wisconsin State Representative

== Historic locations ==
- Lidice Memorial
- Phillips High School

== Images ==
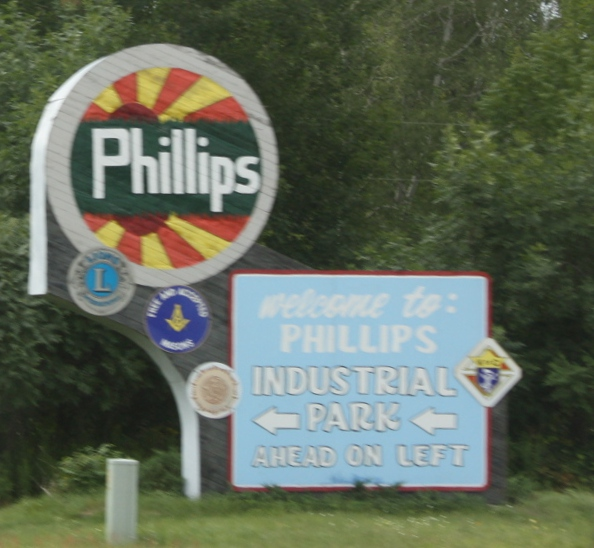
Welcome sign

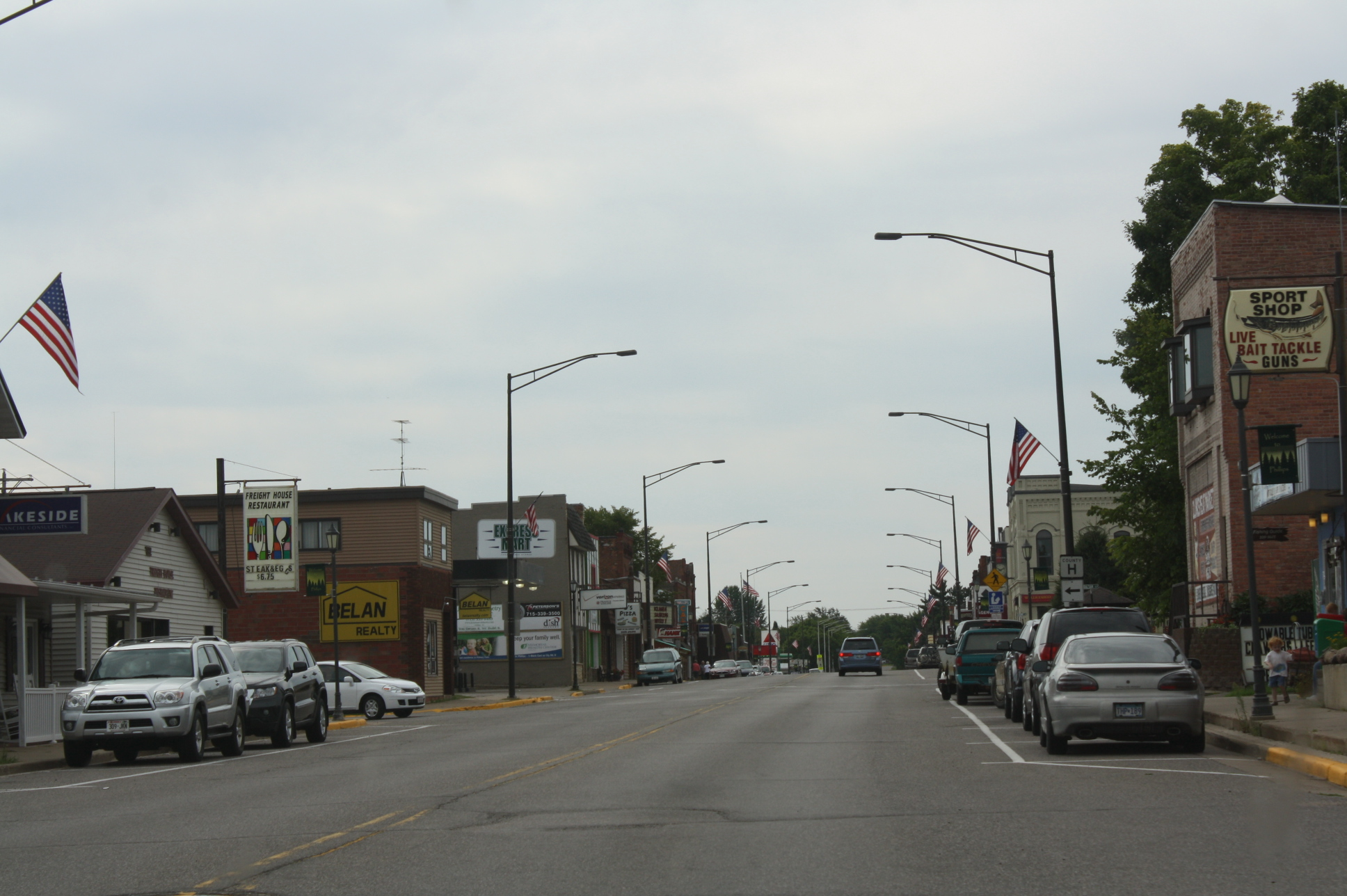
Downtown Phillips on WIS 13
