= Medeiros Neto =

Municipality of Bahia State, Brazil

- Municipality
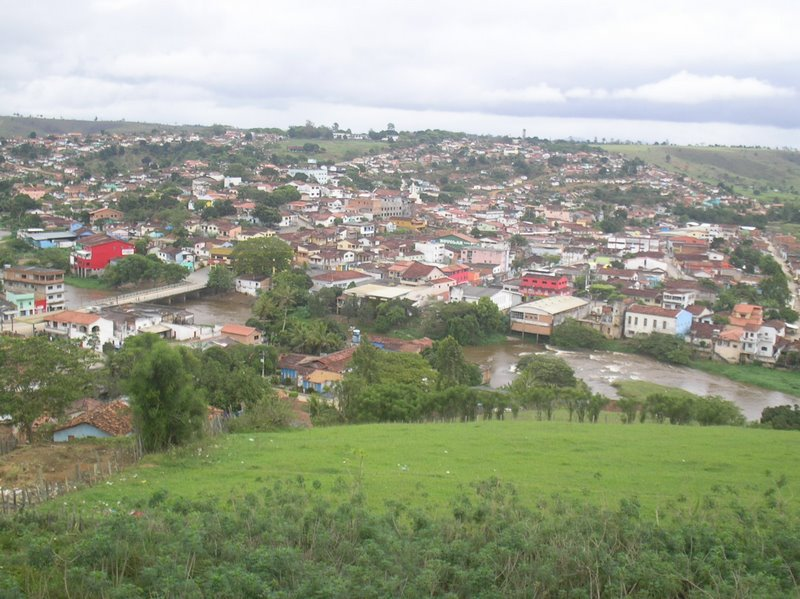
- View of Medeiros Neto

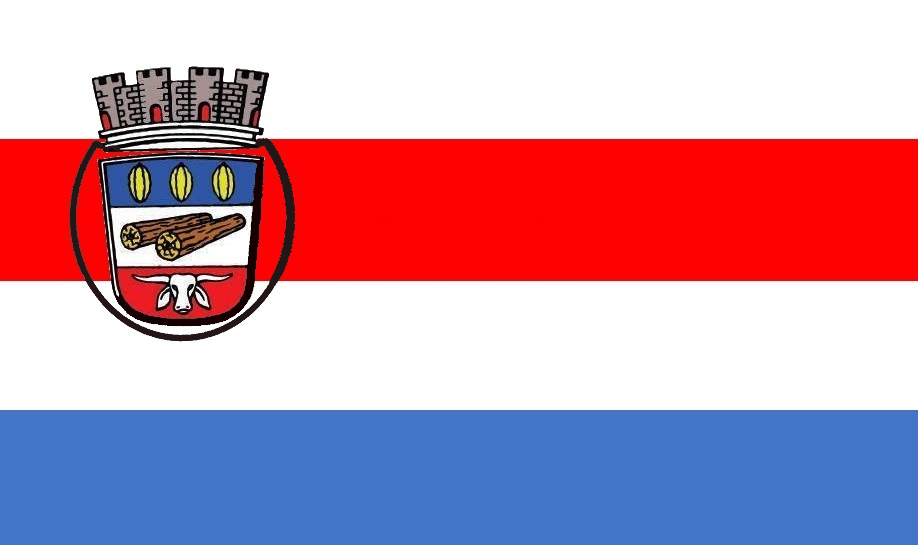
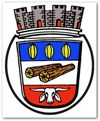
- Flag Coat of arms

- Coordinates: 17°20′S 40°14′W
- Country: Brazil
- Region: Nordeste
- State: Bahia

Population (2020)
  - Total: 22,716
- Time zone: UTC−3 (BRT)

Medeiros Neto (Portuguese pronunciation: [meˈdejɾus ˈnɛtu]) is a municipality in the state of Bahia in the Northeast region of Brazil. It is named after the politician Antônio Garcia de Medeiros Neto, active in the early 20th century.

== See also ==
- List of municipalities in Bahia
