= Price County Airport =

Airport in Wisconsin, United States

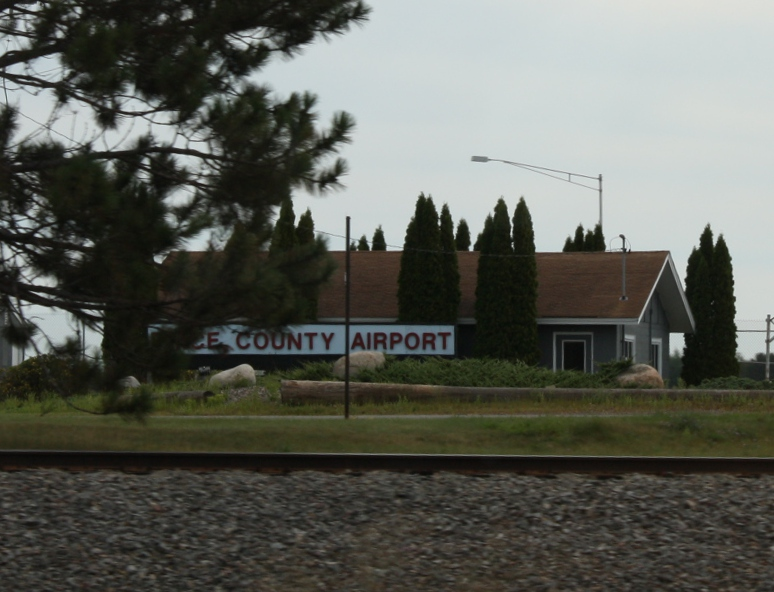
- IATA: none; ICAO: KPBH; FAA LID: PBH

Summary
- Airport type: Public
- Owner: Price County
- Serves: Phillips, Wisconsin
- Opened: May 1945
- Time zone: CST (UTC−06:00)
  - Summer (DST): CDT (UTC−05:00)
- Elevation AMSL: 1,497 ft (456 m)
- Coordinates: 45°42′32″N 090°24′09″W

Map
- Location of airport in Wisconsin PBH (the United States)

Runways
Direction	Length		Surface
Direction	ft	m	Surface
1/19	5,220	1,591	Asphalt
6/24	3,951	1,204	Asphalt

Statistics
- Aircraft operations (2023): 18,100
- Based aircraft (2024): 15
- Source: Federal Aviation Administration

Price County Airport (ICAO: KPBH, FAA LID: PBH) is a county owned public airport located one mile northwest of Phillips, in Price County, Wisconsin, United States. It is included in the Federal Aviation Administration (FAA) National Plan of Integrated Airport Systems for 2025–2029, in which it is categorized as a local general aviation facility.

Many U.S. airports use the same three-letter location identifier for the FAA and IATA, but this facility is assigned PBH by the FAA and has no designation from the IATA (which assigned PBH to Paro Airport in Paro, Bhutan).

== Facilities and aircraft ==
Price County Airport covers 518 acres (210 ha) at an elevation of 1,497 feet (456 m) above mean sea level. It has two asphalt runways: the primary runway 1/19 is 5,220 by 75 feet (1,591 x 23 m) and the crosswind runway 6/24 is 3,951 by 75 feet (1,204 x 23 m), all with approved GPS approaches.

For the twelve month period ending June 22, 2023 the airport had 18,100 aircraft operations, an average of 49 per day: 84% general aviation, 15% air taxi and 1% military. In July 2024, there were 15 aircraft based at this airport: all 15 single-engine.

== See also ==
- List of airports in Wisconsin
