= Coins of the Czechoslovak koruna (1953) =

2 Czechoslovak koruna (1986).
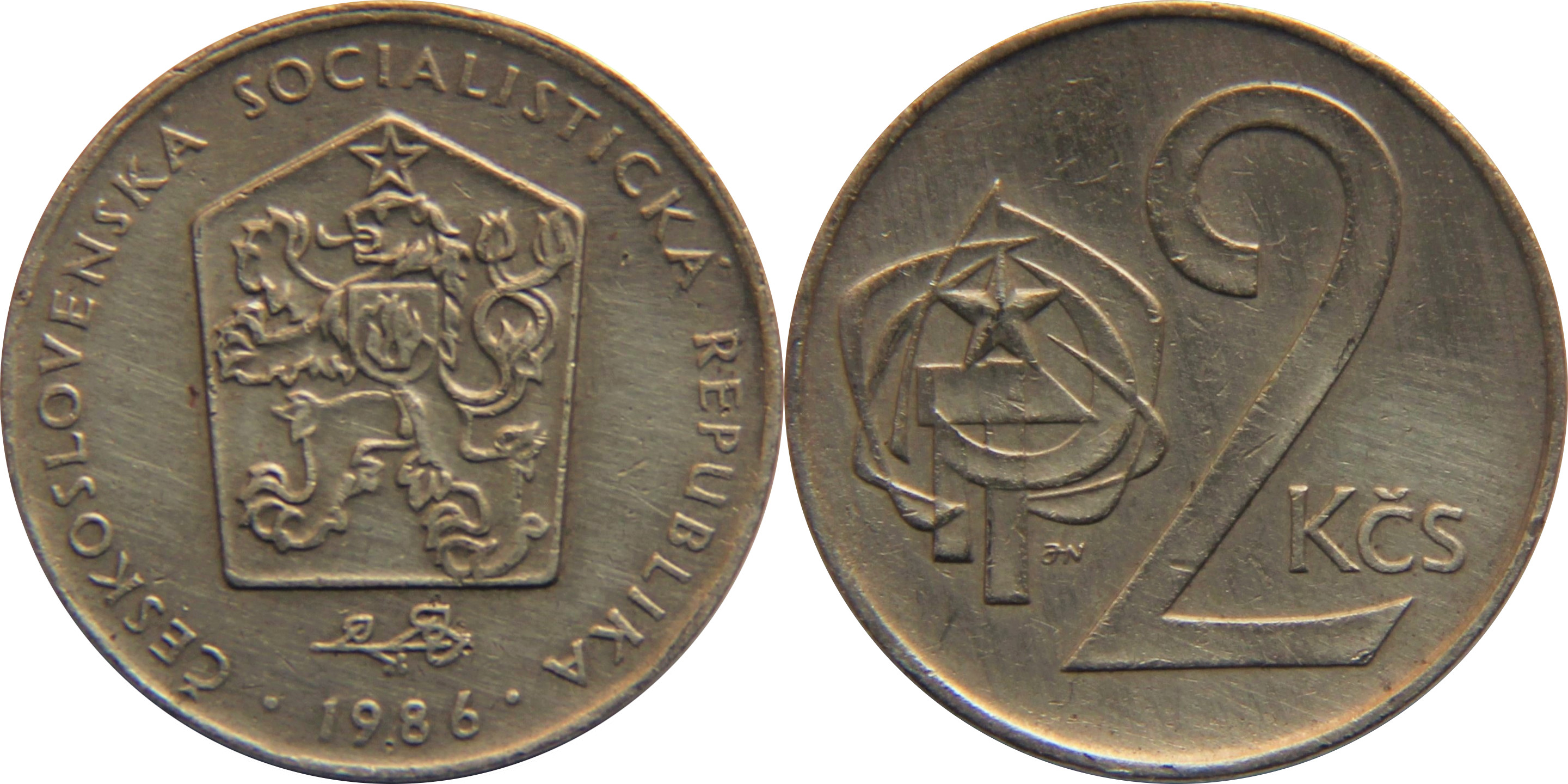
First side of the image: Obverse: Socialist coat of arms and linden twig surrounded by year and lettering "ČESKOSLOVENSKÁ SOCIALISTICKÁ REPUBLIKA".
Second side of the image: Reverse: Hammer and sickle with five-pointed star within abstract linden leaf at left, face-value at right.
205,779,354 coins minted from 1972 to 1990.

After the monetary reform in Czechoslovakia, 1953 a new series of coins were introduced. Coins were first issued in denominations of 1, 3, 5, 10, 25 h – the 1, 3 and 5 Kčs denominations only existed as paper money (state notes). The heller/haléř/halier coins dated 1953 were all minted in Leningrad. The atypical denominations of 3 and 25 were directly copied from the Soviet roubles and kopecks. The 1, 3 and 5 Kčs state notes were replaced by coins in 1957, 1965 and 1966, respectively. The 50 h coin appeared in 1963. By the end of 1972 the 25 h and 3 Kčs coins were withdrawn, and 20 h (as part of the new series) and 2 Kčs coins were introduced instead in October. The 3 h coin was withdrawn in 1976. A redesigned series of 5, 10 and 20 heller coins (without 1 h, which had almost gone out of practical use by then) was released in 1977, 1974 and 1978, respectively. 3 and 5 crown coins were introduced in 1965 and 1966, respectively, with 20h and 2 koruny coins added in 1972. 10 korun coins were introduced in 1990.

Until 1960 the "REPUBLIKA ČESKOSLOVENSKÁ" inscription was used with the traditional pre-war coat of arms on the coins. After the 1960 Constitution of Czechoslovakia changed the country's full name, the strikes from 1961 onwards bore the new socialist-style coat of arms along with the inscription "ČESKOSLOVENSKÁ SOCIALISTICKÁ REPUBLIKA" (meaning "Czechoslovak Socialist Republic" in both Czech and Slovak).

1953–1990 issues
Value	Technical parameters			Description			Date of		
Value	Diameter	Mass	Composition	Edge	Obverse	Reverse	first minting	issue	withdrawal
1 h	16 mm	0.5 g	96.65 aluminium 3% magnesium 0.35%% manganese	Smooth	Coat of arms, "REPUBLIKA ČESKOSLOVENSKÁ", year of minting	Indication of value, wreath of leafage, five-pointed star	1953	1 June 1953	8 February 1993
1 h	16 mm	0.5 g	96.65% aluminium 3% magnesium 0.35% manganese	Smooth	Socialist coat of arms, "ČESKOSLOVENSKÁ SOCIALISTICKÁ REPUBLIKA", year of minting	Indication of value, wreath of leafage, five-pointed star	1962	2 May 1962	8 February 1993
3 h	18 mm	0.66 g	96.65% aluminium 3% magnesium 0.35% manganese	Smooth	Coat of arms, "REPUBLIKA ČESKOSLOVENSKÁ", year of minting	Indication of value, wreath of leafage, five-pointed star	1953	1 June 1953	31 January 1976
3 h	18 mm	0.66 g	96.65% aluminium 3% magnesium 0.35% manganese	Smooth	Socialist coat of arms, "ČESKOSLOVENSKÁ SOCIALISTICKÁ REPUBLIKA", year of minting	Indication of value, wreath of leafage, five-pointed star	1962	1 December 1962	31 January 1976
5 h	20 mm	0.8 g	96.65% aluminium 3% magnesium 0.35% manganese	Smooth	Coat of arms, "REPUBLIKA ČESKOSLOVENSKÁ", year of minting	Indication of value, wreath of leafage, five-pointed star	1953	1 June 1953	31 December 1978
5 h	20 mm	0.8 g	96.65% aluminium 3% magnesium 0.35% manganese	Smooth	Socialist coat of arms, "ČESKOSLOVENSKÁ SOCIALISTICKÁ REPUBLIKA", year of minting	Indication of value, wreath of leafage, five-pointed star	1962	1 December 1962	31 December 1978
5 h	16.2 mm	0.75 g	98% aluminium 2% magnesium	Smooth	Socialist coat of arms, "ČESKOSLOVENSKÁ SOCIALISTICKÁ REPUBLIKA", year of minting	Indication of value, five-pointed star	1977	1 July 1977	8 February 1993
10 h	22 mm	1.18 g	96.65% aluminium 3% magnesium 0.35% manganese	Milled	Coat of arms, "REPUBLIKA ČESKOSLOVENSKÁ", year of minting	Indication of value, wreath of leafage, five-pointed star	1953	1 June 1953	31 December 1977
10 h	22 mm	1.18 g	96.65% aluminium 3% magnesium 0.35% manganese	Milled	Socialist coat of arms, "ČESKOSLOVENSKÁ SOCIALISTICKÁ REPUBLIKA", year of minting	Indication of value, wreath of leafage, five-pointed star	1961	1 December 1961	31 December 1977
10 h	18.2 mm	0.9 g	98% aluminium 2% magnesium	Smooth	Socialist coat of arms, "ČESKOSLOVENSKÁ SOCIALISTICKÁ REPUBLIKA", year of minting	Indication of value, five-pointed star	1974	1 December 1974	8 February 1993
20 h	19.5 mm	2.6 g	Brass; 79% copper 20% zinc 1% nickel	Milled	Socialist coat of arms, "ČESKOSLOVENSKÁ SOCIALISTICKÁ REPUBLIKA", year of minting	Indication of value, five-pointed star	1972	1 October 1972	8 February 1993
25 h	24 mm	1.43 g	96.65% aluminium 3% magnesium 0.35% manganese	Milled	Coat of arms, "REPUBLIKA ČESKOSLOVENSKÁ", year of minting	Indication of value, wreath of leafage, five-pointed star	1953	1 June 1953	31 December 1972
25 h	24 mm	1.43 g	96.65% aluminium 3% magnesium 0.35% manganese	Milled	Socialist coat of arms, "ČESKOSLOVENSKÁ SOCIALISTICKÁ REPUBLIKA", year of minting	Indication of value, wreath of leafage, five-pointed star	1962	1 December 1962	31 December 1972
50 h	21.5 mm	3.0 g	Brass; 90% copper 10% zinc	Milled	Socialist coat of arms, "ČESKOSLOVENSKÁ SOCIALISTICKÁ REPUBLIKA", year of minting	Indication of value, wreath of leafage, five-pointed star	1963	1 April 1963	31 December 1979
50 h	20.8 mm	3.2 g	Cupronickel; 80% copper 20% nickel	Milled	Socialist coat of arms, "ČESKOSLOVENSKÁ SOCIALISTICKÁ REPUBLIKA", year of minting	Indication of value, five-pointed star	1978	2 October 1978	8 February 1993
1 Kčs	23 mm	4 g	Aluminium bronze 91% copper 8% aluminium 1% manganese	Milled	Coat of arms, "REPUBLIKA ČESKOSLOVENSKÁ", year of minting	Indication of value, a woman planting lindens	1957	2 September 1957	8 February 1993
1 Kčs	23 mm	4.0 g	Aluminium bronze 91% copper 8% aluminium 1% manganese	Milled	Socialist coat of arms, "ČESKOSLOVENSKÁ SOCIALISTICKÁ REPUBLIKA", year of minting	Indication of value, a woman planting lindens	1961	1 December 1961	8 February 1993
2 Kčs	24 mm	6.0 g	Cupronickel; 80% copper 20% nickel	Ornaments	Socialist coat of arms, "ČESKOSLOVENSKÁ SOCIALISTICKÁ REPUBLIKA", year of minting	Indication of value, abstract pattern with five-pointed star and hammer and sickle	1972	1 October 1972	8 February 1993
3 Kčs	23.5 mm	5.5 g	Cupronickel; 80% copper 20% nickel	Ornaments	Socialist coat of arms, "ČESKOSLOVENSKÁ SOCIALISTICKÁ REPUBLIKA", year of minting	Indication of value, pattern with flower and ribbon of national colours	1965	1 November 1965	31 December 1972
5 Kčs	26 mm	7 g	Cupronickel; 80% copper 20% nickel	Ornaments	Socialist coat of arms, "ČESKOSLOVENSKÁ SOCIALISTICKÁ REPUBLIKA", year of minting	Indication of value, abstract pattern with flower and cranes, five-pointed star	1966	1 August 1966	8 February 1993
10 Kčs	24,5 mm	8 g	aluminium bronze	?	Indication of value, Coat of arms of Czechoslovakia, "ČSFR", year of minting	T. G. Masaryk 1850 · 1937 (1991: M.R. Štefánika, 1992 Alois Rašín)	1990	1 August 1990	31 July 1993

== 1990-92 Series ==
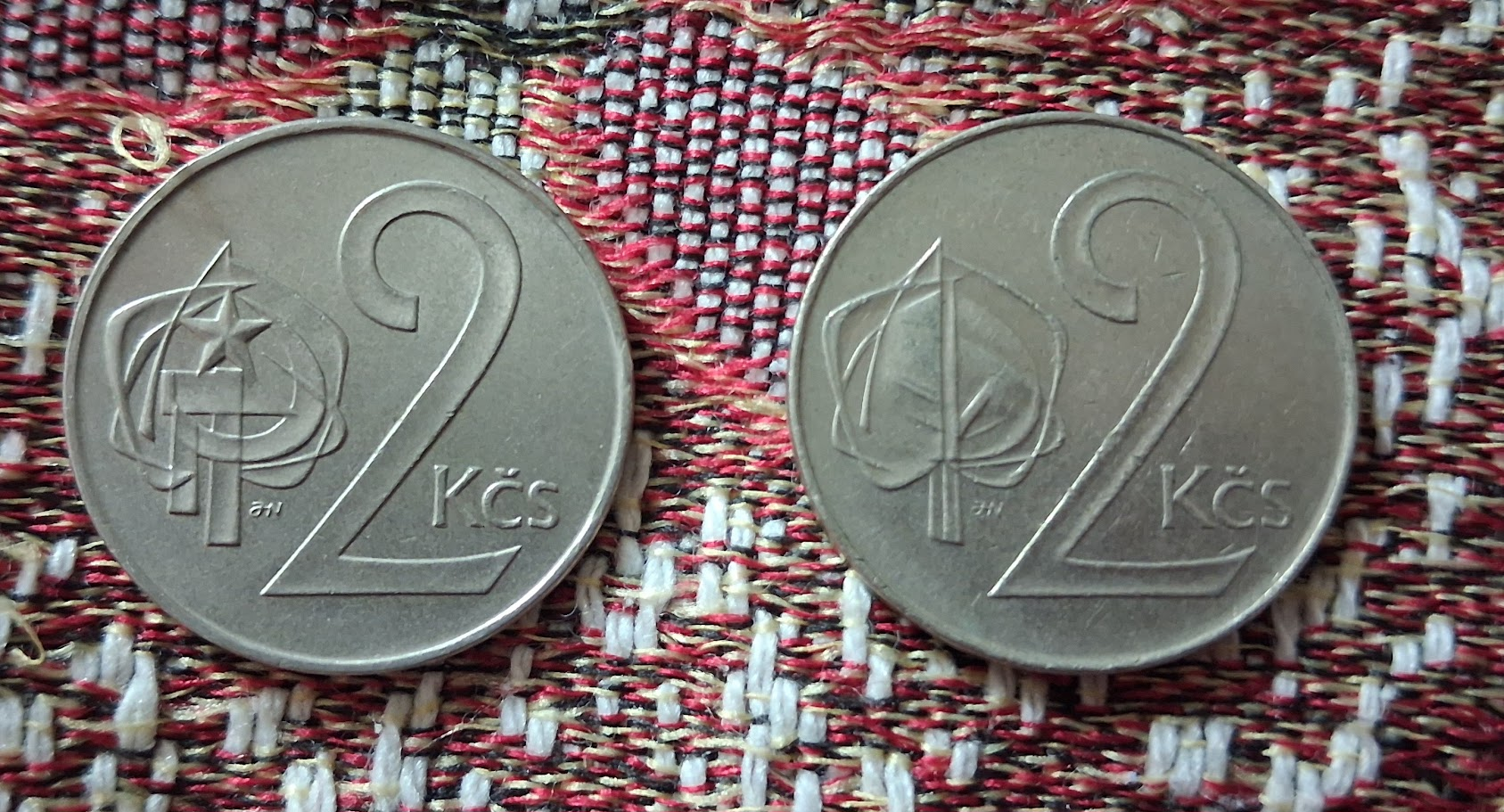
The hammer and sickle was removed in 1991. On the picture are 2 Koruny coins from 1990 and 1991.

Coins from 1990 still had the old socialist coat of arms, even after the Czech and Slovak Federative Republic was established.

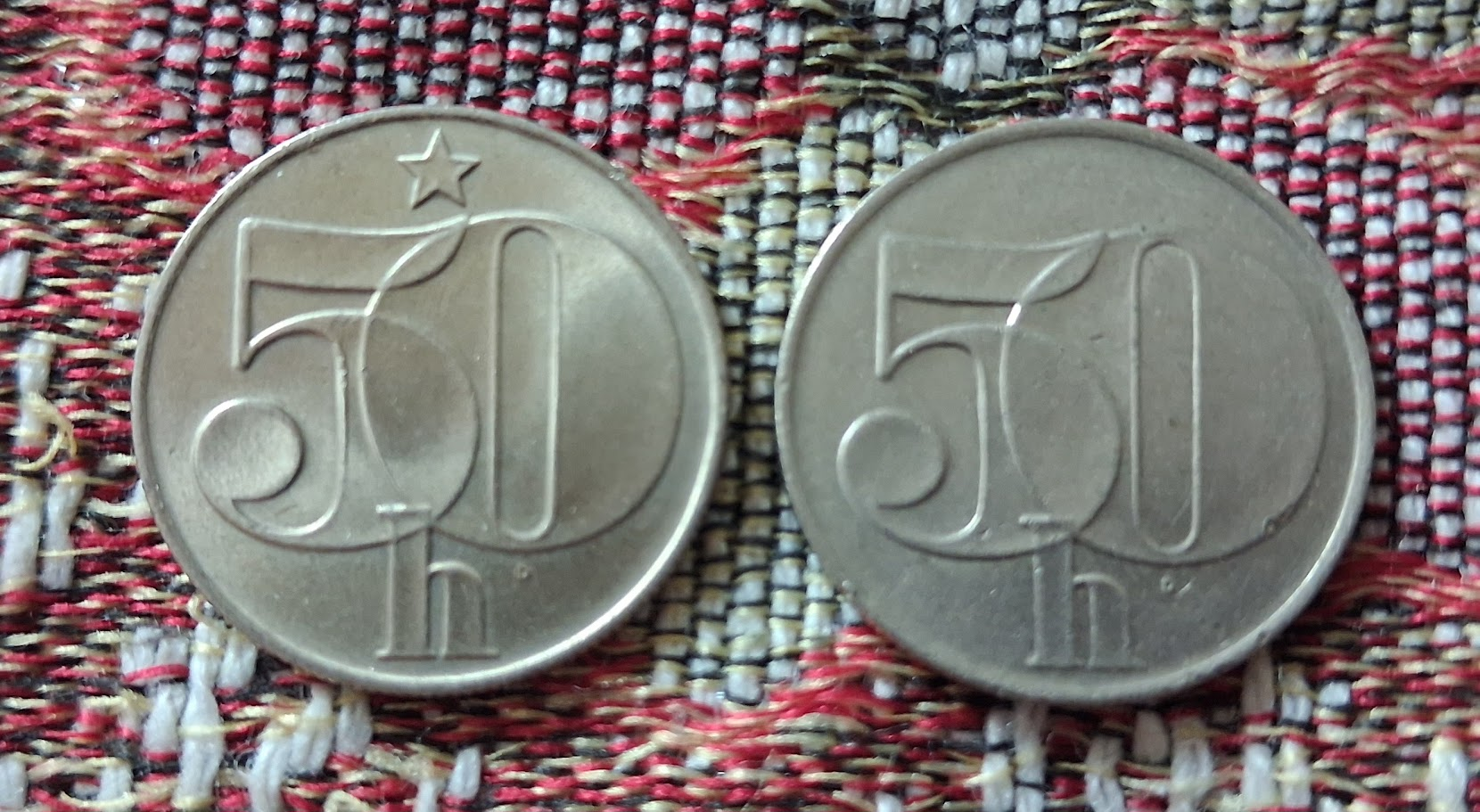
50 h coins from 1990 and 1992. The star symbol was removed from all coins in 1991.

A new coin series was introduced that replaced the socialist coat of arms with the new ones and replacing the full name of the Czechoslovak Socialist Republic to just "ČSFR" (Czech and Slovak Federative Republic) which was minted and issued in 1991 and 1992 (with the exception of the 10 Korun coin that was also minted in 1993). The new coin series also removed the star from around the denomination of the coin on the obverse and the hammer and sickle on the 2 Koruny. Coins from 5 halier up to 5 Korun (and 10 Korun but only as circulation commemorative coins with different variations) were introduced and circulated in parallel with the previous series. The 10 Korun had different portraits issued: T.G. Masaryk, M.R. Štefánik and A. Rašín).
