= Charles L. Pearson =

American politician (1860–1918)

Member of the Wisconsin Senate from the 27th district
- In office January 7, 1907 – January 2, 1911
- Preceded by: George Wylie
- Succeeded by: John M. True

Personal details
- Born: May 14, 1860 Buffalo, Marquette County, Wisconsin, U.S.
- Died: March 12, 1918 (aged 57) Greenfield, Sauk County, Wisconsin, U.S.
- Resting place: Walnut Hill Cemetery, Baraboo
- Party: Democratic
- Spouse: Blanche Cora Hesselgrave (m. 1887–1918)
- Children: Gladys Elaine (Spencer)^{(b. 1889; died 1974)}; Myrtle Iris Pearson^{(b. 1891; died 1897)}; Alger C. Pearson^{(b. 1895; died 1919)}; Alpha Blanche (Tye)^{(b. 1895; died 1997)}; Armour David Pearson^{(b. 1902; died 1928)}; Bernyce Anne (Manville)^{(b. 1907; died 2009)}; Helen Pearson
- Occupation: Strawberry farmer

Charles Levi Pearson (May 14, 1860 – March 12, 1918) was an American strawberry farmer and Democratic politician from Sauk County, Wisconsin. He was a member of the Wisconsin Senate, representing the 27th Senate district during the 1907 and 1909 sessions.

== Biography ==
Charles Pearson was born May 14, 1860, in the town of Buffalo, Marquette County, Wisconsin. As a child, he moved with his family to Greenfield, Sauk County, Wisconsin, where he spent most of the rest of his life. He was educated in the schools in Greenfield and the neighboring city of Baraboo, Wisconsin.

He attended business school in Janesville, Wisconsin, and then went to work as a railroad telegraph operator. He quit that business after a few years, because he thought working indoors was hurting his health. He purchased a farm in West Point, Wisconsin. After four years, he returned to Greenfield and purchased his family's former estate, where he cultivated strawberries for the rest of his life.

In 1904, he ran for the Democratic nomination for Wisconsin State Assembly in Sauk County's 1st Assembly district. At the district convention, he lost the nomination to Ed C. Perkins, who went on to lose the general election.

Two years later, he ran for Wisconsin Senate in the 27th Senate district, which then comprised Columbia and Sauk counties. The Republican incumbent, George Wylie, was defeated in the primary. Pearson ultimately prevailed by just 83 votes in the general election.

In the last year of his term, he suffered a bout of pleurisy from which he never fully recovered. His health declined for the net eight years and he died in his home in Greenfield on March 12, 1918.

== Personal life and family ==
Charles Pearson was the second of six children born to Levi and Eunice (née Sutton) Pearson.

He married Blanche Cora Hesselgrave in 1887. They had seven children together, though one child died young. Their eldest son, Alger C. Pearson, was appointed postmaster in lieu of his father, but died just a year after his father due to a train accident.

Wisconsin Senate
Preceded by George Wylie	Member of the Wisconsin Senate from the 27th district January 7, 1907 – January 2, 1911	Succeeded by John M. True
