= Wisconsin's 27th Senate district =

American legislative district in Dane County, Wisconsin

Wisconsin's 27th State Senate district
- 2024 map defined in 2023 Wisc. Act 94; 2022 map defined in Johnson v. Wisconsin Elections Commission; 2011 map was defined in 2011 Wisc. Act 43 composed of Assembly districts 79, 80, and 81
Senator
Dianne Hesselbein; D–Middleton
since January 3, 2023 (3 years, 154 days)
- Demographics: 80.11% White; 4.56% Black; 5.47% Hispanic; 8.27% Asian; 1.29% Native American; 0.09% Hawaiian/Pacific Islander
- Population (2020) • Voting age: 179,647; 141,303
- Website: Official website
- Notes: South-central Wisconsin

The 27th Senate district of Wisconsin is one of 33 districts in the Wisconsin Senate. Located in south-central Wisconsin, the district comprises most of the northwest quadrant of Dane County. It includes much of the west side of the city of Madison, as well as portions of Madison's far north side. The 27th also includes the suburban cities of Middleton and Verona, and the villages of Black Earth, Cross Plains, Dane, Mazomanie, and Waunakee.

== Current elected officials ==
Dianne Hesselbein is the senator representing the 27th district since January 2023. She previously served ten years in the Wisconsin State Assembly, representing the 79th district.

Each Wisconsin State Senate district is composed of three Wisconsin State Assembly districts. The 27th Senate district comprises the 79th, 80th, and 81st Assembly districts. The current representatives of those districts are:

- Assembly District 79: Lisa Subeck (D–Madison)
- Assembly District 80: Mike Bare (D–Verona)
- Assembly District 81: Alex Joers (D–Middleton)

The district is located entirely Wisconsin's 2nd congressional district, which is represented by U.S. Representative Mark Pocan.

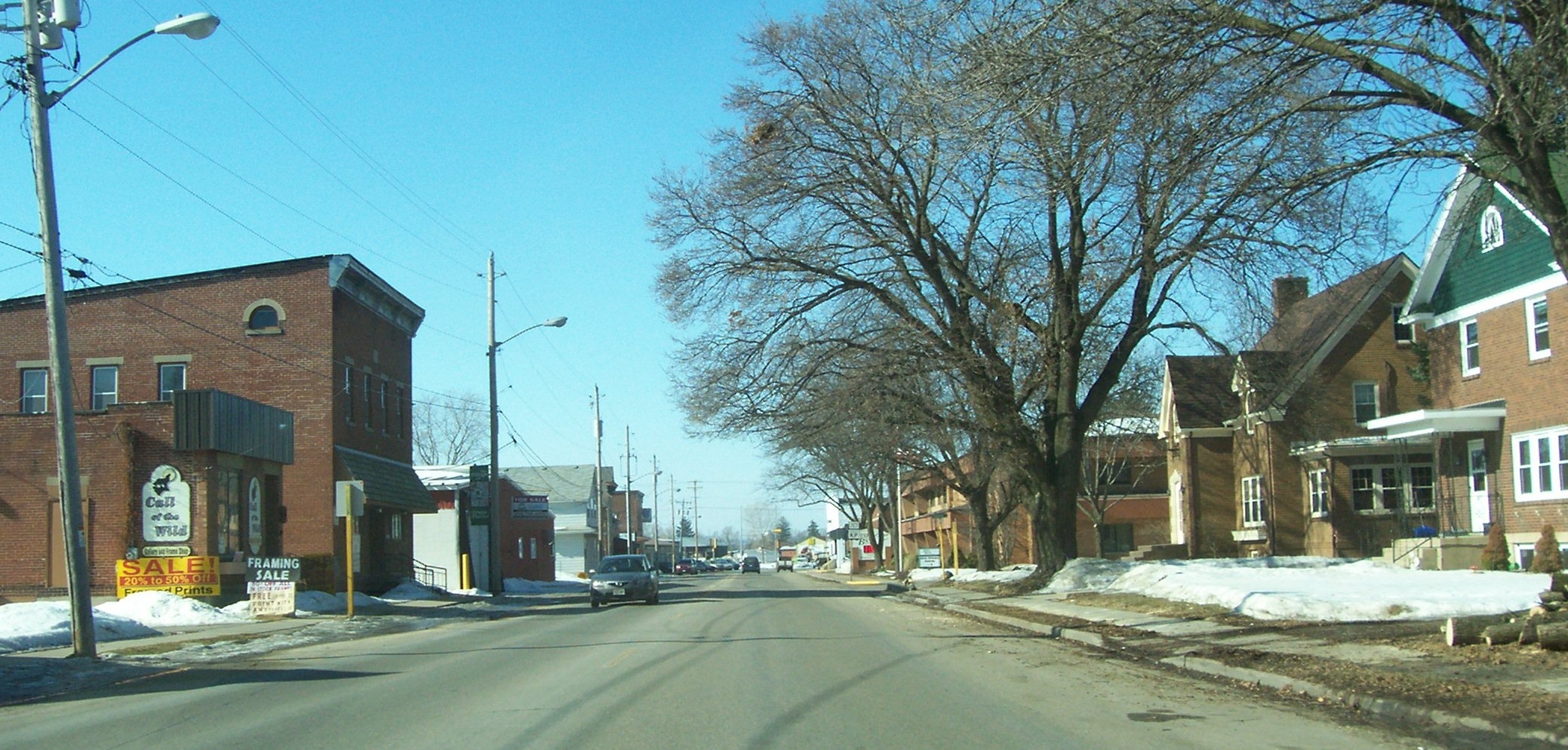
Downtown Cross Plains

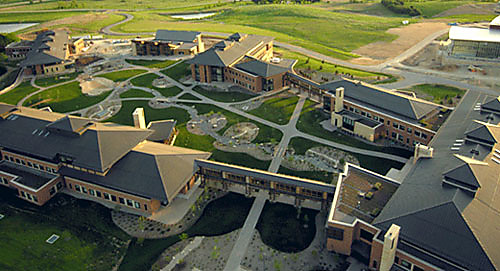
Epic Systems headquarters in Verona

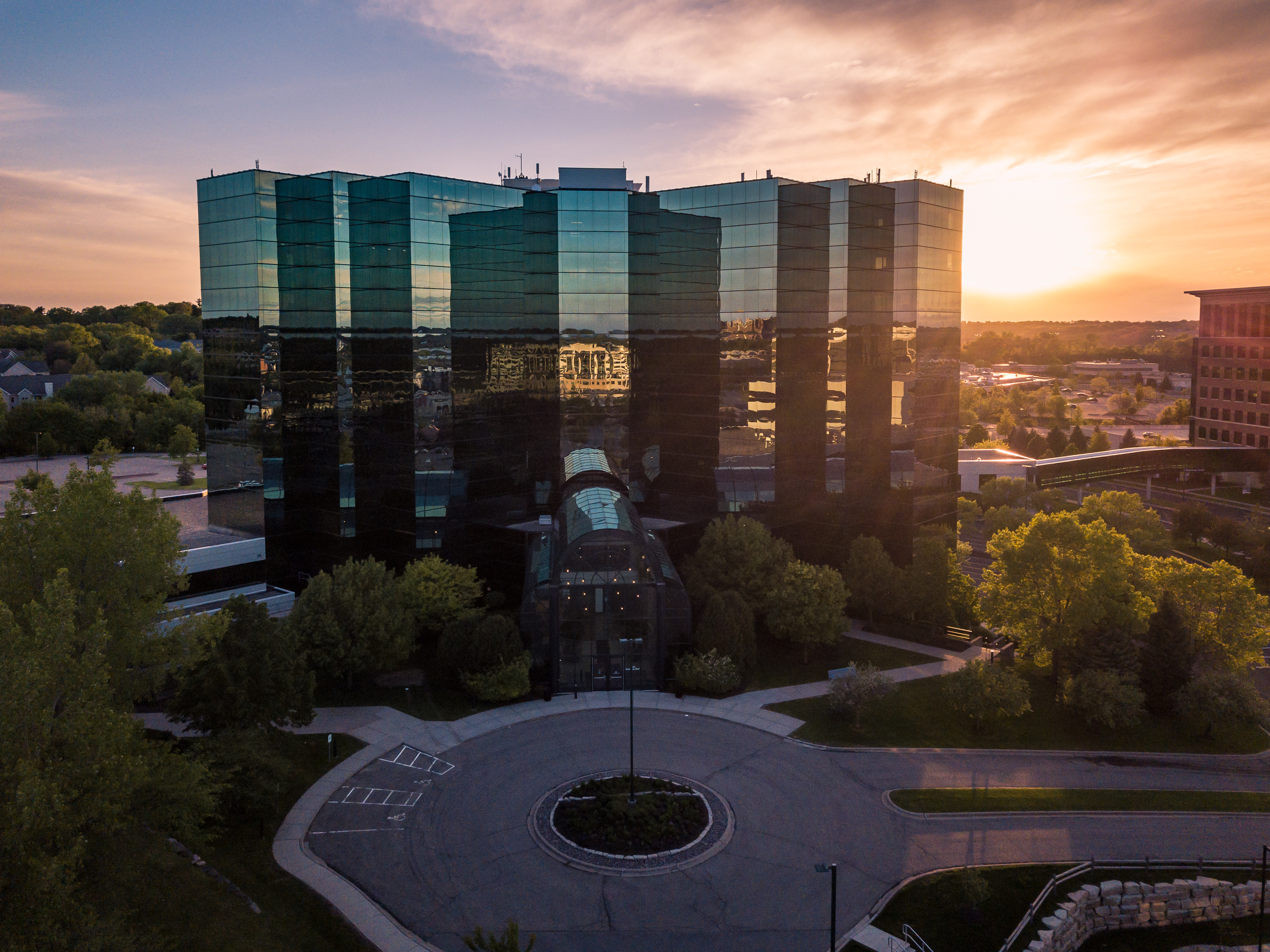
Wisconsin Trade Center in Middleton.

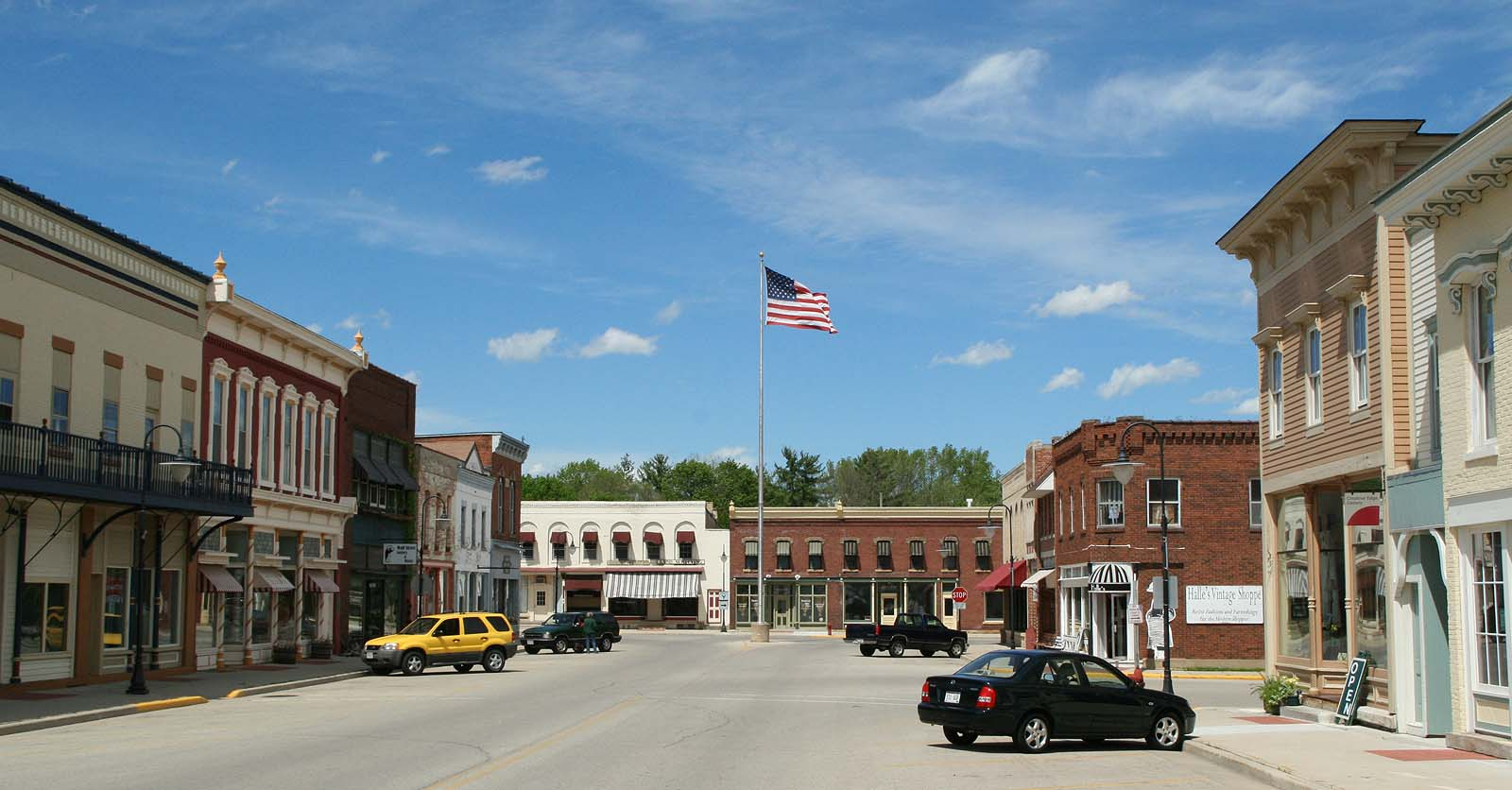
Mazomanie

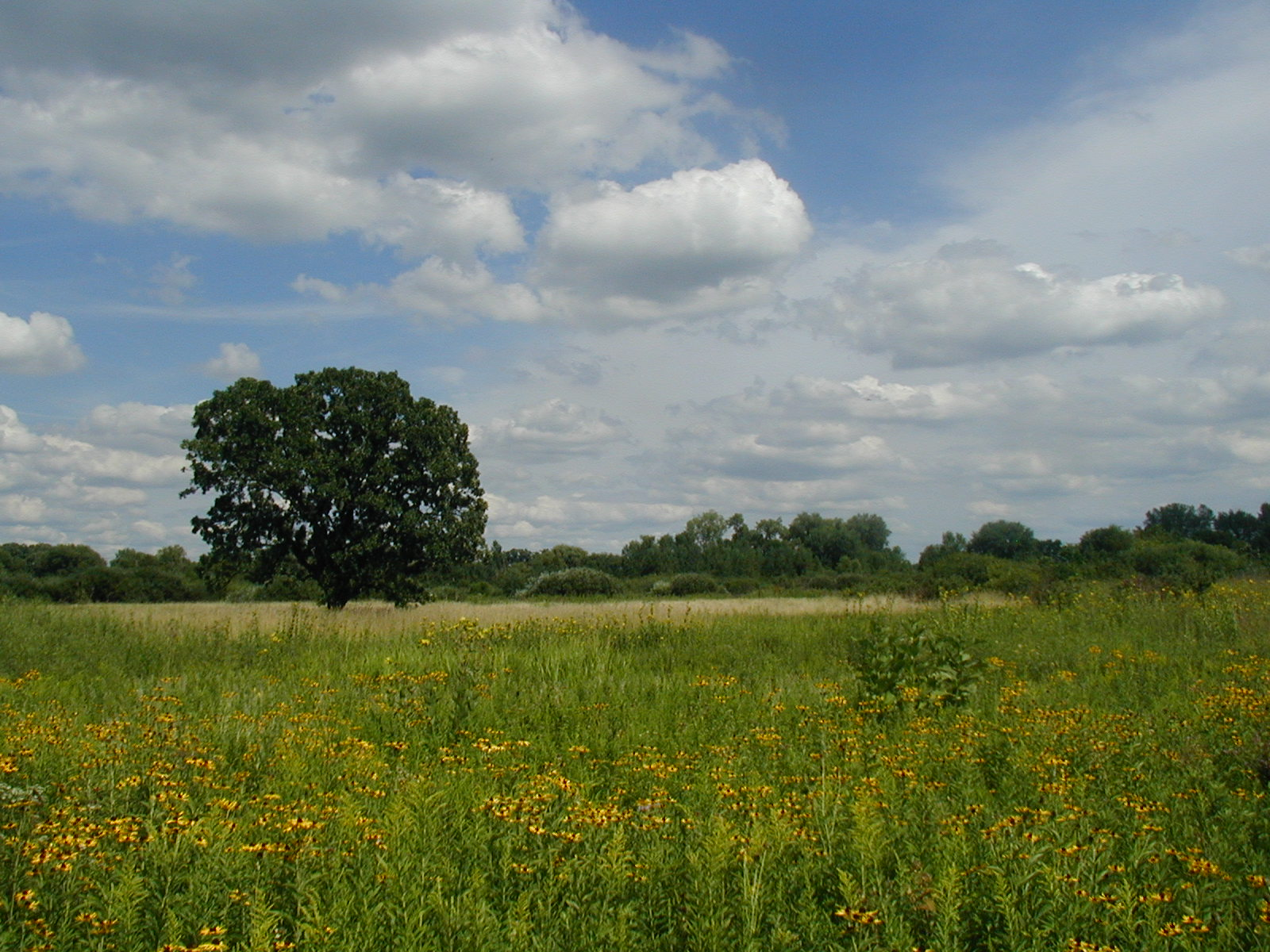
Governor Nelson State Park

== Past senators ==
The district has previously been represented by:

Note: the boundaries of districts have changed repeatedly over history. Previous politicians of a specific numbered district have represented a completely different geographic area, due to redistricting.

Senator	Party	Notes	Session	Years	District Definition
District created by 1856 Wisc. Act 109.				1856	Marathon, Portage, Waupaca, Waushara, and Wood counties
Luther Hanchett	Rep.		10th	1857	Marathon, Portage, Waupaca, Waushara, and Wood counties
Luther Hanchett	Rep.		11th	1858	Marathon, Portage, Waupaca, Waushara, and Wood counties
Luther Hanchett	Rep.		12th	1859	Marathon, Portage, Waupaca, Waushara, and Wood counties
Luther Hanchett	Rep.		13th	1860	Marathon, Portage, Waupaca, Waushara, and Wood counties
Edward L. Browne	Rep.		14th	1861	Marathon, Portage, Waupaca, Waushara, and Wood counties
Edward L. Browne	Rep.		15th	1862	Marathon, Portage, Waupaca, and Wood counties
Alexander S. McDill	Rep.		16th	1863	Marathon, Portage, Waupaca, and Wood counties
Alexander S. McDill	Natl. Union		17th	1864	Marathon, Portage, Waupaca, and Wood counties
Milan H. Sessions	Natl. Union		18th	1865	Marathon, Portage, Waupaca, and Wood counties
Milan H. Sessions	Natl. Union		19th	1866	Marathon, Portage, Waupaca, and Wood counties
Edward L. Browne	Natl. Union		20th	1867	Marathon, Portage, Waupaca, and Wood counties
Edward L. Browne	Natl. Union		21st	1868	Marathon, Portage, Waupaca, and Wood counties
Charles M. Webb	Rep.		22nd	1869	Marathon, Portage, Waupaca, and Wood counties
Charles M. Webb	Rep.		23rd	1870	Marathon, Portage, Waupaca, and Wood counties
Myron Reed	Dem.	Redistricted to 21st district.	24th	1871	Marathon, Portage, Waupaca, and Wood counties
William M. Griswold	Rep.	Redistricted from 25th district.	25th	1872	Columbia County
Evan O. Jones	Rep.		26th	1873	Columbia County
Evan O. Jones	Rep.		27th	1874	Columbia County
Levi W. Barden	Rep.		28th	1875	Columbia County
Levi W. Barden	Rep.		29th	1876	Columbia County
Levi W. Barden	Rep.		30th	1877	Adams and Columbia counties
Levi W. Barden	Rep.		31st	1878	Adams and Columbia counties
Charles L. Dering	Rep.		32nd	1879	Adams and Columbia counties
Charles L. Dering	Rep.		33rd	1880	Adams and Columbia counties
Gilbert E. McKeeby	Rep.		34th	1881	Adams and Columbia counties
Gilbert E. McKeeby	Rep.		35th	1882	Adams, Columbia, and Marquette counties 1880 population: 43,713; 1885 population: 46,263
William T. Parry	Rep.		36th	1883–1884	Adams, Columbia, and Marquette counties 1880 population: 43,713; 1885 population: 46,263
William T. Parry	Rep.		37th	1885–1886	Adams, Columbia, and Marquette counties 1880 population: 43,713; 1885 population: 46,263
Levi E. Pond	Rep.		38th	1887–1888	Adams, Columbia, and Marquette counties 1880 population: 43,713; 1885 population: 46,263
Levi E. Pond	Rep.		39th	1889–1890	Adams, Columbia, and Marquette counties 1880 population: 43,713; 1885 population: 46,263
Russell C. Falconer	Dem.		40th	1891–1892	Adams, Columbia, and Marquette counties 1880 population: 43,713; 1885 population: 46,263
Russell C. Falconer	Dem.		41st	1893–1894	Sauk County and Western Columbia County; 1890 population: 44,629
William F. Conger	Rep.		42nd	1895–1896	Sauk County and Western Columbia County; 1890 population: 44,629
William F. Conger	Rep.		43rd	1897–1898	Columbia and Sauk counties 1895 population: 63,787; 1900 population: 64,127; 1910 population: 63,998
William G. Bissell	Rep.		44th	1899–1900	Columbia and Sauk counties 1895 population: 63,787; 1900 population: 64,127; 1910 population: 63,998
William G. Bissell	Rep.		45th	1901–1902	Columbia and Sauk counties 1895 population: 63,787; 1900 population: 64,127; 1910 population: 63,998
George Wylie	Rep.		46th	1903–1904	Columbia and Sauk counties 1895 population: 63,787; 1900 population: 64,127; 1910 population: 63,998
George Wylie	Rep.		47th	1905–1906	Columbia and Sauk counties 1895 population: 63,787; 1900 population: 64,127; 1910 population: 63,998
Charles L. Pearson	Dem.		48th	1907–1908	Columbia and Sauk counties 1895 population: 63,787; 1900 population: 64,127; 1910 population: 63,998
Charles L. Pearson	Dem.		49th	1909–1910	Columbia and Sauk counties 1895 population: 63,787; 1900 population: 64,127; 1910 population: 63,998
John M. True	Rep.		50th	1911–1912	Columbia and Sauk counties 1895 population: 63,787; 1900 population: 64,127; 1910 population: 63,998
John M. True	Rep.		51st	1913–1914	Columbia and Sauk counties 1895 population: 63,787; 1900 population: 64,127; 1910 population: 63,998
George Staudenmayer	Dem.		52nd	1915–1916	Columbia and Sauk counties 1895 population: 63,787; 1900 population: 64,127; 1910 population: 63,998
George Staudenmayer	Dem.		53rd	1917–1918	Columbia and Sauk counties 1895 population: 63,787; 1900 population: 64,127; 1910 population: 63,998
George Staudenmayer	Rep.		54th	1919–1920	Columbia and Sauk counties 1895 population: 63,787; 1900 population: 64,127; 1910 population: 63,998
George Staudenmayer	Rep.		55th	1921–1922	Columbia and Sauk counties 1895 population: 63,787; 1900 population: 64,127; 1910 population: 63,998
George Staudenmayer	Rep.		56th	1923–1924	Columbia, Richland, and Sauk counties
George Staudenmayer	Rep.		57th	1925–1926	Columbia, Richland, and Sauk counties
Robert Caldwell	Rep.		58th	1927–1928	Columbia, Richland, and Sauk counties
Robert Caldwell	Rep.		59th	1929–1930	Columbia, Richland, and Sauk counties
Fred W. Zantow	Rep.		60th	1931–1932	Columbia, Richland, and Sauk counties
Fred W. Zantow	Rep.		61st	1933–1934	Columbia, Richland, and Sauk counties
E. Myrwyn Rowlands	Prog.		62nd	1935–1936	Columbia, Richland, and Sauk counties
E. Myrwyn Rowlands	Prog.		63rd	1937–1938	Columbia, Richland, and Sauk counties
Jess Miller	Rep.	Died Dec. 1965.	64th	1939–1940	Columbia, Richland, and Sauk counties
Jess Miller	Rep.	Died Dec. 1965.	65th	1941–1942	Columbia, Richland, and Sauk counties
Jess Miller	Rep.	Died Dec. 1965.	66th	1943–1944	Columbia, Richland, and Sauk counties
Jess Miller	Rep.	Died Dec. 1965.	67th	1945–1946	Columbia, Richland, and Sauk counties
Jess Miller	Rep.	Died Dec. 1965.	68th	1947–1948	Columbia, Richland, and Sauk counties
Jess Miller	Rep.	Died Dec. 1965.	69th	1949–1950	Columbia, Richland, and Sauk counties
Jess Miller	Rep.	Died Dec. 1965.	70th	1951–1952	Columbia, Richland, and Sauk counties
Jess Miller	Rep.	Died Dec. 1965.	71st	1953–1954	Columbia, Richland, and Sauk counties
Jess Miller	Rep.	Died Dec. 1965.	72nd	1955–1956	Columbia, Crawford, Richland, and Sauk counties
Jess Miller	Rep.	Died Dec. 1965.	73rd	1957–1958	Columbia, Crawford, Richland, and Sauk counties
Jess Miller	Rep.	Died Dec. 1965.	74th	1959–1960	Columbia, Crawford, Richland, and Sauk counties
Jess Miller	Rep.	Died Dec. 1965.	75th	1961–1962	Columbia, Crawford, Richland, and Sauk counties
Jess Miller	Rep.	Died Dec. 1965.	76th	1963–1964	Columbia, Crawford, Richland, and Sauk counties
Jess Miller	Rep.	Died Dec. 1965.	77th	1965–1966	Adams, Columbia, Juneau, Marquette, and Sauk counties
--Vacant--			77th	1965–1966	Adams, Columbia, Juneau, Marquette, and Sauk counties
Walter Terry	Rep.		78th	1967–1968	Adams, Columbia, Juneau, Marquette, and Sauk counties
Walter Terry	Rep.		79th	1969–1970	Adams, Columbia, Juneau, Marquette, and Sauk counties
Everett Bidwell	Rep.		80th	1971–1972	Adams, Columbia, Juneau, Marquette, and Sauk counties
Everett Bidwell	Rep.		81st	1973–1974	Columbia, Marquette, and Sauk counties and Southern Adams County; Western Dodge County; Southern Juneau County; Part of Jefferson County
Everett Bidwell	Rep.		82nd	1975–1976	Columbia, Marquette, and Sauk counties and Southern Adams County; Western Dodge County; Southern Juneau County; Part of Jefferson County
Everett Bidwell	Rep.		83rd	1977–1978	Columbia, Marquette, and Sauk counties and Southern Adams County; Western Dodge County; Southern Juneau County; Part of Jefferson County
Everett Bidwell	Rep.		84th	1979–1980	Columbia, Marquette, and Sauk counties and Southern Adams County; Western Dodge County; Southern Juneau County; Part of Jefferson County
Everett Bidwell	Rep.		85th	1981–1982	Columbia, Marquette, and Sauk counties and Southern Adams County; Western Dodge County; Southern Juneau County; Part of Jefferson County
Russ Feingold	Dem.	Resigned 1992 after elected to United States Senate.	86th	1983–1984	Columbia County and Most of Sauk County; Most of Richland County; Northwest Dane County; Western Dodge County
Russ Feingold	Dem.	Resigned 1992 after elected to United States Senate.	87th	1985–1986	Columbia County and Western Dane County; Part of Dodge County; Part of Green County; Part of Rock County; Part of Sauk County
Russ Feingold	Dem.	Resigned 1992 after elected to United States Senate.	88th	1987–1988	Columbia County and Western Dane County; Part of Dodge County; Part of Green County; Part of Rock County; Part of Sauk County
Russ Feingold	Dem.	Resigned 1992 after elected to United States Senate.	89th	1989–1990	Columbia County and Western Dane County; Part of Dodge County; Part of Green County; Part of Rock County; Part of Sauk County
Russ Feingold	Dem.	Resigned 1992 after elected to United States Senate.	90th	1991–1992	Columbia County and Western Dane County; Part of Dodge County; Part of Green County; Part of Rock County; Part of Sauk County
--Vacant--			91st	1993–1994	Green County and Western Dane County; Western Rock County
Joe Wineke	Dem.	Won 1993 special election.	91st	1993–1994	Green County and Western Dane County; Western Rock County
Joe Wineke	Dem.	Won 1993 special election.	92nd	1995–1996	Green County and Western Dane County; Western Rock County
Joe Wineke	Dem.	Won 1993 special election.	93rd	1997–1998	Green County and Western Dane County; Western Rock County
Jon Erpenbach	Dem.		94th	1999–2000	Green County and Western Dane County; Western Rock County
Jon Erpenbach	Dem.		95th	2001–2002	Green County and Western Dane County; Western Rock County
Jon Erpenbach	Dem.		96th	2003–2004	Green County and Western Dane County; Part of Lafayette County; Part of Rock County
Jon Erpenbach	Dem.		97th	2005–2006	Green County and Western Dane County; Part of Lafayette County; Part of Rock County
Jon Erpenbach	Dem.		98th	2007–2008	Green County and Western Dane County; Part of Lafayette County; Part of Rock County
Jon Erpenbach	Dem.		99th	2009–2010	Green County and Western Dane County; Part of Lafayette County; Part of Rock County
Jon Erpenbach	Dem.		100th	2011–2012	Green County and Western Dane County; Part of Lafayette County; Part of Rock County
Jon Erpenbach	Dem.		101st	2013–2014	Western Dane County; Most of Sauk County; Eastern Iowa County; Part of Columbia County; Part of Green County
Jon Erpenbach	Dem.		102nd	2015–2016	Western Dane County; Most of Sauk County; Eastern Iowa County; Part of Columbia County; Part of Green County
Jon Erpenbach	Dem.		103rd	2017–2018	Western Dane County; Most of Sauk County; Eastern Iowa County; Part of Columbia County; Part of Green County
Jon Erpenbach	Dem.		104th	2019–2020	Western Dane County; Most of Sauk County; Eastern Iowa County; Part of Columbia County; Part of Green County
Jon Erpenbach	Dem.		105th	2021–2022	Western Dane County; Most of Sauk County; Eastern Iowa County; Part of Columbia County; Part of Green County
Dianne Hesselbein	Dem.	Elected 2022.	106th	2023–2024	Western Dane County, eastern Sauk County eastern Iowa County parts of Columbia County northwest Green County
Dianne Hesselbein	Dem.	Elected 2022.	107th	2025–2026	Northwest Dane County
