= Levi E. Pond =

19th century American politician

Levi Pond
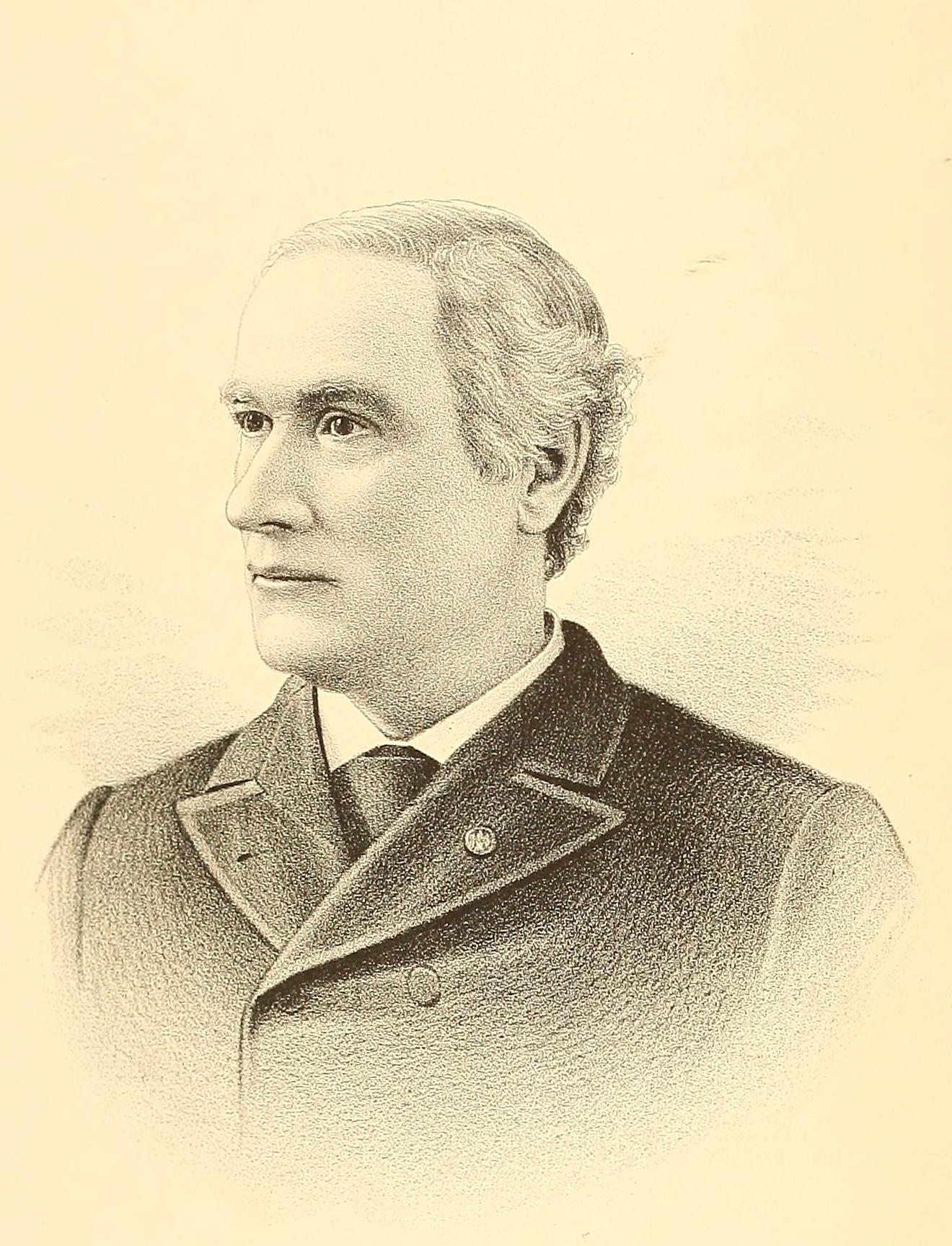
- From Portrait and biographical album of Green Lake, Marquette and Waushara counties, Wisconsin (1890)

Member of the Wisconsin Senate from the 27th district
- In office January 3, 1887 – March 1, 1890
- Preceded by: William T. Parry
- Succeeded by: Russell C. Falconer

Personal details
- Born: March 8, 1833 Addison, New York, U.S.
- Died: May 8, 1895 (aged 62) Westfield, Wisconsin, U.S.
- Resting place: Springfield Cemetery, Westfield, Wisconsin
- Party: Republican
- Spouse: Czarina O. Richards (m. 1864–1895)
- Children: Esther Pond^{(b. 1865; died 1866)}; Flora Maria Pond^{(b. 1867; died 1868)}; Levi Earle Pond^{(b. 1871; died 1937)}
- Occupation: farmer, politician

Military service
- Allegiance: United States
- Branch/service: United States Volunteers; Union Army
- Years of service: 1861–1864
- Rank: Captain, USV
- Unit: 7th Reg. Wis. Vol. Infantry
- Battles/wars: American Civil War

Levi Elwin Pond (March 8, 1833 – May 8, 1895) was an American farmer and Republican politician. He was a member of the Wisconsin State Senate, representing Adams, Columbia, and Marquette counties for three years. During the American Civil War, he served as a Union Army officer in the Iron Brigade of the Army of the Potomac and was wounded at the Battle of Gettysburg and the Siege of Petersburg.

== Early life ==
Born in Addison, New York, Pond went to the public schools in his early years and worked as a paid farmhand and teacher to fund his further education. With his earnings, he attended the Union Academy in Tioga County, Pennsylvania. He moved west to Wisconsin with his parents and two sisters in 1856. The family settled on a small farm in the town of Springfield, in Marquette County, Wisconsin. In Wisconsin, he worked on the family farm in the summers and taught school in the winters until the outbreak of the American Civil War in 1861. He also served as local superintendent of schools, town clerk, and justice of the peace.

== Civil War service ==
Pond was one of the first in Wisconsin to volunteer for service in the Union Army after word of the attack on Fort Sumter. He joined a company of volunteers who were enrolled as Company E of the 7th Wisconsin Infantry Regiment and mustered into service in the Fall of 1861. He was elected 1st sergeant of his company when the regiment was being organized, then commissioned second lieutenant in January 1862, while the regiment was engaged in training and construction of fortifications near Washington, D.C. In February 1863, after the first lieutenant was reassigned and the captain of the company resigned, Pond was promoted to captain of Company E. He remained in that role through much of the rest of the war.

At Battle of Gettysburg, he was shot in the chest. He returned to duty less than two months later, but was in diminished physical condition for the rest of his service. He was shot twice more during the Siege of Petersburg, in June 1864, and spent the next two months in a hospital in Annapolis, Maryland. He was sent home to Wisconsin in August 1864 and officially mustered out of service in December.

== Postbellum career ==
After recovering, he started a mercantile business in Oshkosh, Wisconsin, but the business ended in 1870 after a disastrous fire wiped out his inventory. He then worked as a traveling salesman for several years, based out of Oshkosh. He returned from Oshkosh to Marquette County in 1876 and worked in the real estate and insurance businesses.

He was elected to the Wisconsin State Senate in 1886, representing the 27th State Senate district. He resigned his Senate seat in March 1890 after he was appointed U.S. pension agent at Milwaukee, by President Benjamin Harrison. He served two years in that role.

He died of a sudden heart attack in May 1895, at his home in Westfield, Wisconsin.

== Personal life and family ==
Levi Pond was the fourth of six children born to William W. and Elvira (née Forbes) Pond. The Ponds were descended from Samuel Pond, an English colonist who settled in the Connecticut Colony sometime before 1642.

Levi Pond married Czarina O. Richards on February 29, 1864. They had at least three children together, though only one son survived infancy.

== Electoral history ==
=== Wisconsin Senate (1886) ===
Wisconsin Senate, 27th District Election, 1886
Party	Candidate	Votes	%	±%
General Election, November 2, 1886
Republican	Levi Pond	4,845	58.05%	+3.51%
Democratic	E. S. Baker	3,501	41.95%	
Plurality		1,344	16.10%	+7.01%
Total votes		8,346	100.0%	+22.38%
Republican hold				

Wisconsin Senate
Preceded by William T. Parry	Member of the Wisconsin Senate from the 27th district January 3, 1887 – March 1, 1890	Succeeded by Russell C. Falconer
