= Senator Conger (disambiguation) =

Omar D. Conger (1818–1898) was a U.S. Senator from Michigan from 1881 to 1887. Senator Conger may also refer to:

- Abraham Bogart Conger (1814–1887), New York State Senate
- Benn Conger (1856–1922), New York State Senate
- William F. Conger (1844–1918), Wisconsin State Senate
