= Senator Falconer =

Senator Falconer may refer to:

- Jacob Falconer (1869–1928), Washington State Senate
- Russell C. Falconer (1851–1936), Wisconsin State Senate
