= Buffalo, Wisconsin =

Buffalo is the name of some places in the U.S. state of Wisconsin:

- Buffalo County, Wisconsin
- Buffalo City, Wisconsin, a city
- Buffalo, Buffalo County, Wisconsin, a town
- Buffalo, Marquette County, Wisconsin, a town
