= William F. Conger =

19th century American politician

Member of the Wisconsin Senate from the 27th district
- In office January 7, 1895 – January 2, 1899
- Preceded by: Russell C. Falconer
- Succeeded by: William G. Bissell

Personal details
- Born: March 5, 1844 Bloomfield, New Jersey, U.S.
- Died: November 17, 1918 (aged 74) Pasadena, California, U.S.
- Resting place: Prairie du Sac Cemetery, Prairie du Sac, Wisconsin
- Party: Republican
- Spouses: Helen Garvin (m. 1866; died 1899); Caroline "Carrie" Petway (m. 1901–1918)
- Children: Frederick Garvin Conger^{(b. 1869; died 1911)}; William A. Conger^{(b. 1873; died 1918)}

Military service
- Allegiance: United States
- Branch/service: United States Volunteers; Union Army
- Years of service: 1862–1865
- Rank: Sergeant, USV
- Unit: 7th Reg. N.Y. Vol. Infantry; 42nd Reg. Wis. Vol. Infantry
- Battles/wars: American Civil War

William Frame Conger (March 5, 1844 – November 17, 1918) was an American businessman and Republican politician from the state of Wisconsin. He was a member of the Wisconsin State Senate, representing Sauk and western Columbia counties in the 1895 and 1897 sessions.

== Biography ==
William F. Conger was born in Bloomfield, New Jersey, in March 1844, and was raised and educated in the public schools in Bloomfield and New York City.

At age 18, he enlisted for service in the Union Army during the American Civil War and was enrolled in the 7th New York Infantry Regiment. He served until the end of his term, in 1864, and then moved to the state of Wisconsin. He remained only briefly before re-enlisting with a Wisconsin regiment, and was enrolled as a sergeant in the 42nd Wisconsin Infantry Regiment. He remained with the 42nd Wisconsin Infantry until the end of the war and was acting sergeant major of the regiment for part of his service.

Back in Wisconsin, he worked as a clerk in Prairie du Sac until 1871, when he went into business as a wool dealer, which remained his primary occupation for the rest of his life.

Politically, Conger was a member of the Republican Party. He was the Republican candidate for Wisconsin State Assembly in Sauk County's 1st Assembly district in 1890, but was defeated in the general election by Democrat Thomas William English. He was then a delegate to the 1892 Republican National Convention, which re-nominated Benjamin Harrison.

In 1894, he ran again for state legislature as the Republican candidate for Wisconsin State Senate in the 27th State Senate district. At the time, the district contained all of his native Sauk County as well as the western half of Columbia County. In the general election, he defeated Democrat Evan W. Evans, receiving 55% of the vote.

Conger served in the 1895 and 1897 sessions of the Senate. He sought renomination for another term in 1898 but faced an intense contest. In the 1896 redistricting, his district had expanded to include all of Columbia County. Due to the redistricting, the Republican Party organizations in Columbia and Sauk held separate nominating conventions for the 27th Senate district seat, with Sauk nominating Conger and Columbia nominating A. J. Turner. The two delegations refused to compromise and choose a consensus nominee. A lawsuit ensued, in which Wisconsin circuit judge Robert G. Siebecker ruled that both candidates were entitled to appear on the ballot. With the court unable to resolve the dispute, a new convention was called for the delegates to choose a consensus nominee. Conger and Turner, however, remained determined to deny the nomination to one another. After a contentious debate and 100 ballots, the delegates eventually chose a compromise candidate—William G. Bissell—as their nominee.

After leaving office, he received an appointment as Rural Free Delivery inspector from the United States Postal Service, and was then promoted to superintendent for the southern division, working from the division headquarters in Nashville, Tennessee, for five years until resigning in 1906.

After retiring from federal employment, he returned to Prairie du Sac. He became totally blind a year later, in 1907, after he mistakenly drank a flask of wood alcohol, which he had mistaken as medicine. The anecdote about his blinding was widely reported around the state.

He subsequently moved to Pasadena, California, where he died in the fall of 1918.

== Personal life and family ==
Conger married twice. His first wife was Helen Garvin, with whom he had at least two sons. After her death in 1899, he married Caroline "Carrie" Petway of Tennessee.

== Electoral history ==
=== Wisconsin Assembly (1890) ===
Wisconsin Assembly, Sauk 1st District Election, 1890
Party	Candidate	Votes	%	±%
General Election, November 4, 1890
Democratic	Thomas William English	1,163	49.07%	
Republican	William F. Conger	1,048	44.22%	
Prohibition	Bennett U. Strong	159	6.71%	
Plurality		115	4.85%	
Total votes		2,370	100.0%	
Democratic gain from Republican				

=== Wisconsin Senate (1894) ===
Wisconsin Senate, 27th District Election, 1894
Party	Candidate	Votes	%	±%
General Election, November 6, 1894
Republican	William F. Conger	5,637	55.15%	+12.98%
Democratic	Evan W. Evans	4,194	41.03%	−12.54%
Prohibition	Joseph W. Wood	390	3.82%	−0.44%
Plurality		1,443	14.12%	+2.71%
Total votes		10,221	100.0%	+28.55%
Republican gain from Democratic				

Wisconsin Senate
Preceded by Russell C. Falconer	Member of the Wisconsin Senate from the 27th district January 7, 1895 – January 2, 1899	Succeeded by William G. Bissell
