= Senator Bissell =

Senator Bissell may refer to:

- Clark Bissell (1782–1857), Connecticut State Senate
- William G. Bissell (1857–1925), Wisconsin State Senate
