= Gilbert E. McKeeby =

19th century American politician

Member of the Wisconsin Senate from the 27th district
- In office January 3, 1881 – January 1, 1883
- Preceded by: Charles L. Dering
- Succeeded by: William T. Parry

Personal details
- Born: November 4, 1844 Bath Township, Summit County, Ohio, U.S.
- Died: April 24, 1905 (aged 60) Pueblo, Colorado, U.S.
- Resting place: Red Cloud Cemetery, Red Cloud, Nebraska
- Spouse: Mary Carrie Ansdell (m. 1869–1905)
- Children: Carrie Lucille McKeeby^{(died 1890)}; Fred E. McKeeby^{(b. 1869; died 1931)}
- Education: Bellevue Hospital Medical College
- Profession: Physician

Military service
- Allegiance: United States
- Branch/service: United States Volunteers; Union Army
- Years of service: 1864–1865
- Rank: Corporal, USV
- Unit: 1st Reg. Wis. Hvy. Artillery
- Battles/wars: American Civil War

Gilbert Einstein McKeeby (November 4, 1844 – April 24, 1905) was an American physician and politician. He was a member of the Wisconsin State Senate, representing Adams and Columbia counties.

== Biography ==
McKeeby was born on November 4, 1844, in Bath Township, Summit County, Ohio. His family moved to Oregon, Wisconsin, when he was two years old. During the American Civil War, he served with the 1st Wisconsin Heavy Artillery Regiment of the Union Army. In 1868, McKeeby graduated from the Bellevue Hospital Medical College. He then relocated to Lodi, Wisconsin, in 1868 and practiced medicine in there for 14 years. He married Carrie N. Ansdell in 1869. He moved to Red Cloud, Nebraska, in 1882, to Guthrie, Oklahoma, in 1896, and then to Pueblo, Colorado, in 1901, where he died in 1905.

== Political career ==
McKeeby represented the 27th State Senate district during the 1881 and 1882 sessions. Later, he was mayor of Red Cloud, Nebraska in 1888. McKeeby edited the Red Cloud Republican and served in the Nebraska State Senate. He was a Republican.

Wisconsin Senate
Preceded by Charles L. Dering	Member of the Wisconsin Senate from the 27th district January 3, 1881 – January 1, 1883	Succeeded by William T. Parry
