= John M. True =

American politician

John M. True (1838–1921) was a member of the Wisconsin State Assembly and the Wisconsin State Senate in the USA.

== Biography ==
True was born in Moultonborough, New Hampshire, in 1838. In 1866, he settled in Greenfield, Sauk County, Wisconsin. He died on February 17, 1921, in Galesburg, Illinois, and was buried in Baraboo, Wisconsin, on February 19, 1921.

== Career ==
True was a member of the Assembly during the 1897 and 1899 sessions. From 1911 to 1915, he represented the 27th District in the Senate. Other positions he held include member of the Board of Education (similar to school board) and assessor of Baraboo and chairman of the Board of Supervisors and Register of Deeds of Sauk County, Wisconsin. He was a Republican.
