= William Thomas Parry =

19th century American politician

William T. Parry

Member of the Wisconsin Board of Supervision
- In office June 1, 1889 – April 30, 1891
- Appointed by: William D. Hoard
- Preceded by: James Bintliff
- Succeeded by: Position abolished

Member of the Wisconsin Senate from the 27th district
- In office January 1, 1883 – January 3, 1887
- Preceded by: Gilbert E. McKeeby
- Succeeded by: Levi E. Pond

Member of the Wisconsin State Assembly from the Columbia 1st district
- In office January 3, 1881 – January 1, 1883
- Preceded by: Addison Eaton
- Succeeded by: John McKenzie

Personal details
- Born: May 17, 1837 Bangor, Gwynedd, Wales, UK
- Died: September 10, 1896 (aged 59) Milwaukee, Wisconsin, U.S.
- Cause of death: Throat cancer
- Resting place: Silver Lake Cemetery, Portage, Wisconsin
- Party: Republican
- Spouses: Margaret Williams (m. 1857; died 1866); Annie Roberts (m. 1867–1896)
- Children: with Margaret Williams; Mary A. (Moss); William Parry; with Annie Roberts; Flora Parry; Lemuel R. Parry; Richard Parry; Pierce Parry
- Occupation: Merchant

William Thomas Parry (May 17, 1837 – September 10, 1896) was a Welsh American immigrant, businessman, Republican politician, and Wisconsin pioneer. He was a member of the Wisconsin State Senate and Assembly, representing Columbia County.

== Biography ==
William T. Parry was born in Bangor, Gwynedd, in Wales, and received his basic education there. He emigrated to the United States as a child in 1849, and settled in the town of Manchester, Wisconsin, which was then part of Marquette County. He lived there until adulthood. He moved to Berlin, Wisconsin, in 1858, and then moved to Portage, in Columbia County, Wisconsin, in 1859.

At Portage, he clerked for the business of A. D. Forbes for six years until starting his own merchant business partnership, known as Parry, Bebb, & Muir (later Parry & Muir). He continued running that business until his retirement in 1892.

He was elected to the Wisconsin State Assembly on the Republican Party ticket in 1880 and was re-elected in 1881. In 1882, he was elected to a four-year term in the Wisconsin State Senate. During his time in the Legislature, he was active in supporting temperance legislation.

In 1889, he was appointed to the State Board of Supervision by Governor William D. Hoard, and served on the board until it was disbanded in 1891. The board oversaw the state's mental hospitals, schools for state orphans and for the blind and deaf, and the state prisons. It was replaced by the State Board of Charities and Reform.

He moved to Milwaukee in 1892. He died there on September 10, 1896, after a long and painful battle with throat cancer.

== Personal life and family ==
William Parry married twice. His first wife was Margaret Williams, they married at Randolph, Wisconsin, on June 30, 1857. They had two children together before her death in 1866. The following year, Parry married Annie Roberts—who was also a Welsh immigrant—at Utica, New York. They had four more children. Parry was survived by his second wife and all six children.

Wisconsin State Assembly
Preceded by Addison Eaton	Member of the Wisconsin State Assembly from the Columbia 1st district January 3, 1881 – January 1, 1883	Succeeded by John McKenzie
Wisconsin Senate
Preceded by Gilbert E. McKeeby	Member of the Wisconsin Senate from the 27th district January 1, 1883 – January 3, 1887	Succeeded by Levi E. Pond
Government offices
Preceded by James Bintliff	Member of the Wisconsin Board of Supervision; June 1, 1889 – April 30, 1891	Board abolished
