= Walter Terry =

American politician

Walter E. Terry was a Wisconsin Politician (1909 – 1977) who served as a member of the Wisconsin State Assembly from 1959 to 1965 and later Wisconsin Senate, serving the 27th district of Wisconsin from 1967 to 1969. Terry was a graduate of Baraboo High School and the University of Notre Dame. A member of the Republican Party, he was succeeded in the Wisconsin Senate by Everett Bidwell. As a Wisconsin state senator, Terry served as the chairman of the Committee on Agriculture and the Public Welfare during the 1960s.

== Notes ==
Wisconsin Senate
Preceded by Jess Miller	Member of the Wisconsin Senate from the 27th district 1967–1971	Succeeded by Everett Bidwell
