= Edgar S. Coolidge =

American politician

Member of the Vermont House of Representatives from the Lowell district
- In office 1888

Personal details
- Born: Wyocena, Wisconsin; October 11, 1885
- Died: February 20, 1923 (aged 67) Lowell, Vermont
- Party: Republican

Edgar S. Coolidge (October 11, 1855 – February 20, 1923) was a member of the Vermont House of Representatives.

== Biography ==
Coolidge was born on October 11, 1855, in Wyocena, Wisconsin. His parents were Edward B. Coolidge and Rosetta (Works) Coolidge. He was a Congregationalist and a Mason. He was a farmer in Lowell, Vermont, and served in local government including constable and lister. He died in Lowell, Vermont, on February 20, 1923.

== Career ==
Coolidge was a member of the House of Representatives in 1888. He was a Republican.
