= Wyocena, Wisconsin =

- Village
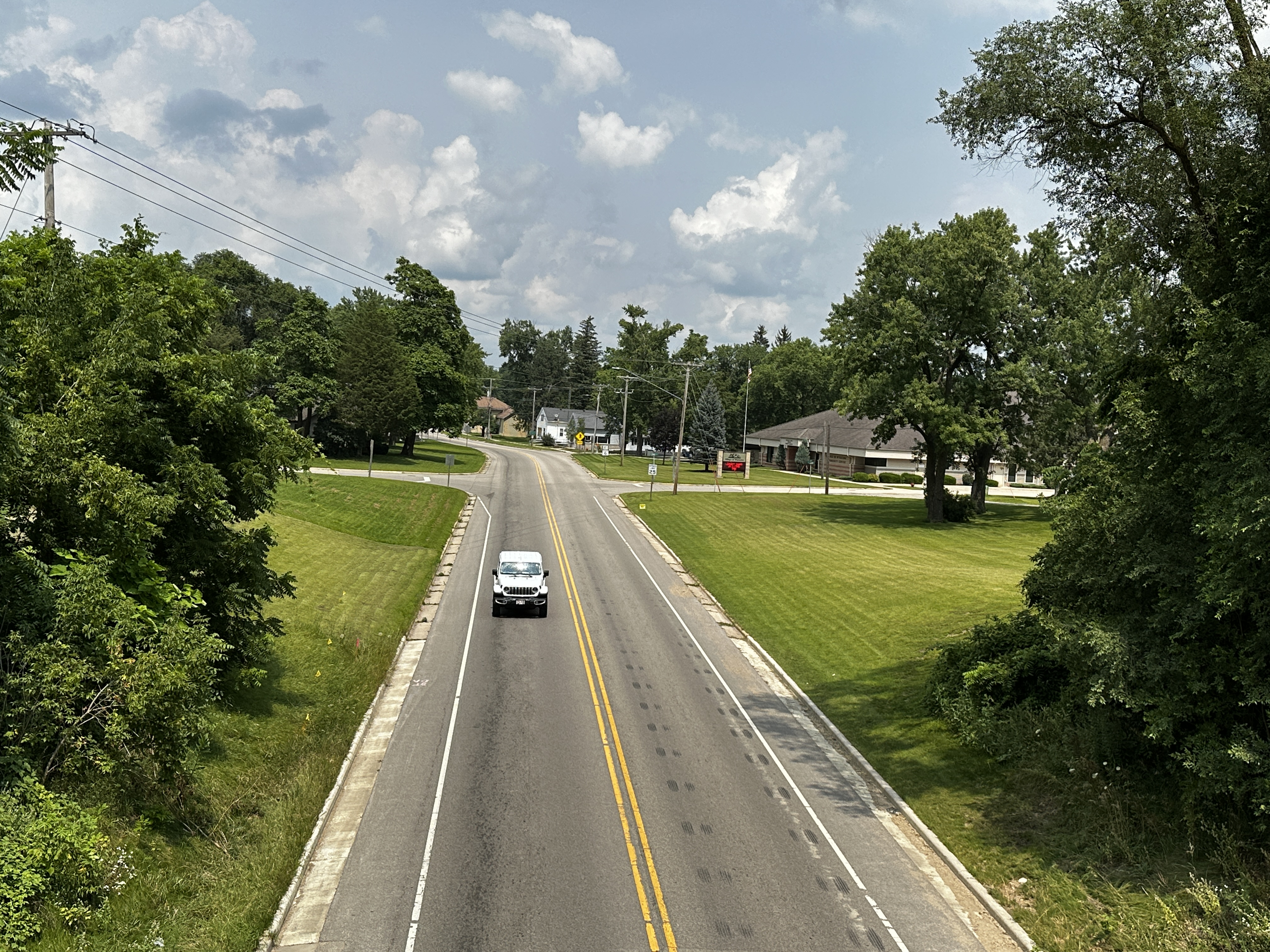
- Wyocena pictured in July 2024

- Location of Wyocena in Columbia County, Wisconsin
- Coordinates: 43°30′40″N 89°18′21″W
- Country: United States
- State: Wisconsin
- County: Columbia

Area
  - Total: 1.56 sq mi (4.04 km^{2})
  - Land: 1.43 sq mi (3.71 km^{2})
  - Water: 0.13 sq mi (0.33 km^{2})
- Elevation: 794 ft (242 m)

Population (2020)
  - Total: 756
  - Density: 528/sq mi (204/km^{2})
- Time zone: UTC-6 (Central (CST))
  - Summer (DST): UTC-5 (CDT)
- FIPS code: 55-89325
- GNIS feature ID: 1577066
- Website: villageofwyocena.com

Wyocena is a village in Columbia County, Wisconsin, United States. The population was 756 at the 2020 census. The village is located within the Town of Wyocena. It is part of the Madison Metropolitan Statistical Area.

== History ==
A tornado struck the village on April 25, 2008, destroying several homes.

== Geography ==
Wyocena is located at 43°29′39″N 89°18′33″W (43.494319, -89.309191).

According to the United States Census Bureau, the village has a total area of 1.55 square miles (4.01 km^{2}), of which 1.42 square miles (3.68 km^{2}) is land and 0.13 square miles (0.34 km^{2}) is water.

=== Highways ===
Wyocena is served by Wis 16 and Wis 22. Wis 16 heads east to Columbus and west to Poynette and Portage. Wis 22 heads north to Pardeeville and Montello and south to US Route 51 at North Leeds. Wis 22 South is the most direct way to get to Madison via US 51 South.

== Demographics ==
Historical population
Census	Pop.	Note	%±
1850	101		—
1870	270		—
1880	219		−18.9%
1910	425		—
1920	425		0.0%
1930	490		15.3%
1940	706		44.1%
1950	714		1.1%
1960	747		4.6%
1970	809		8.3%
1980	548		−32.3%
1990	620		13.1%
2000	668		7.7%
2010	768		15.0%
2020	756		−1.6%
U.S. Decennial Census

=== 2010 census ===
As of the census of 2010, there were 768 people, 271 households, and 170 families living in the village. The population density was 540.8 inhabitants per square mile (208.8/km^{2}). There were 296 housing units at an average density of 208.5 per square mile (80.5/km^{2}). The racial makeup of the village was 98.3% White, 0.1% African American, 0.4% Native American, 0.3% Asian, and 0.9% from two or more races. Hispanic or Latino people of any race were 2% of the population.

There were 271 households, of which 31.4% had children under the age of 18 living with them, 48.7% were married couples living together, 10.3% had a female householder with no husband present, 3.7% had a male householder with no wife present, and 37.3% were non-families. 31.7% of all households were made up of individuals, and 8.1% had someone living alone who was 65 years of age or older. The average household size was 2.38 and the average family size was 2.95.

The median age in the village was 43.5 years. 20.2% of residents were under the age of 18; 6.2% were between the ages of 18 and 24; 25.1% were from 25 to 44; 23.3% were from 45 to 64; and 25.1% were 65 years of age or older. The gender makeup of the village was 46.5% male and 53.5% female.

=== 2000 census ===
As of the census of 2000, there were 668 people, 226 households, and 145 families living in the village. The population density was 466.3 people per square mile (180.4/km^{2}). There were 241 housing units at an average density of 168.2 per square mile (65.1/km^{2}). The racial makeup of the village was 97.9% White, 0.15% Black or African American, 0.15% Native American, 1.35% Asian, 0.15% from other races, and 0.3% from two or more races. 1.2% of the population were Hispanic or Latino of any race.

There were 226 households, out of which 31.4% had children under the age of 18 living with them, 51.3% were married couples living together, 8% had a female householder with no husband present, and 35.8% were non-families. 27.9% of all households were made up of individuals, and 11.1% had someone living alone who was 65 years of age or older. The average household size was 2.37 and the average family size was 2.94.

In the village, the population was spread out, with 19.5% under the age of 18, 6.1% from 18 to 24, 26.8% from 25 to 44, 18.9% from 45 to 64, and 28.7% who were 65 years of age or older. The median age was 43 years. For every 100 females, there were 92 males. For every 100 females age 18 and over, there were 90.1 males.

The median income for a household in the village was $42,857, and the median income for a family was $50,875. Males had a median income of $35,417 versus $24,464 for females. The per capita income for the village was $17,430. About 2.8% of families and 5% of the population were below the poverty line, including 7.8% of those under age 18 and none of those age 65 or over.

== Notable people ==
- Lynn N. Coapman, Wisconsin State Representative
- Edgar S. Coolidge, Vermont State Representative
- Russel C. Falconer, Wisconsin State Senator
- Glenn Wise, Wisconsin Secretary of State

== Images ==
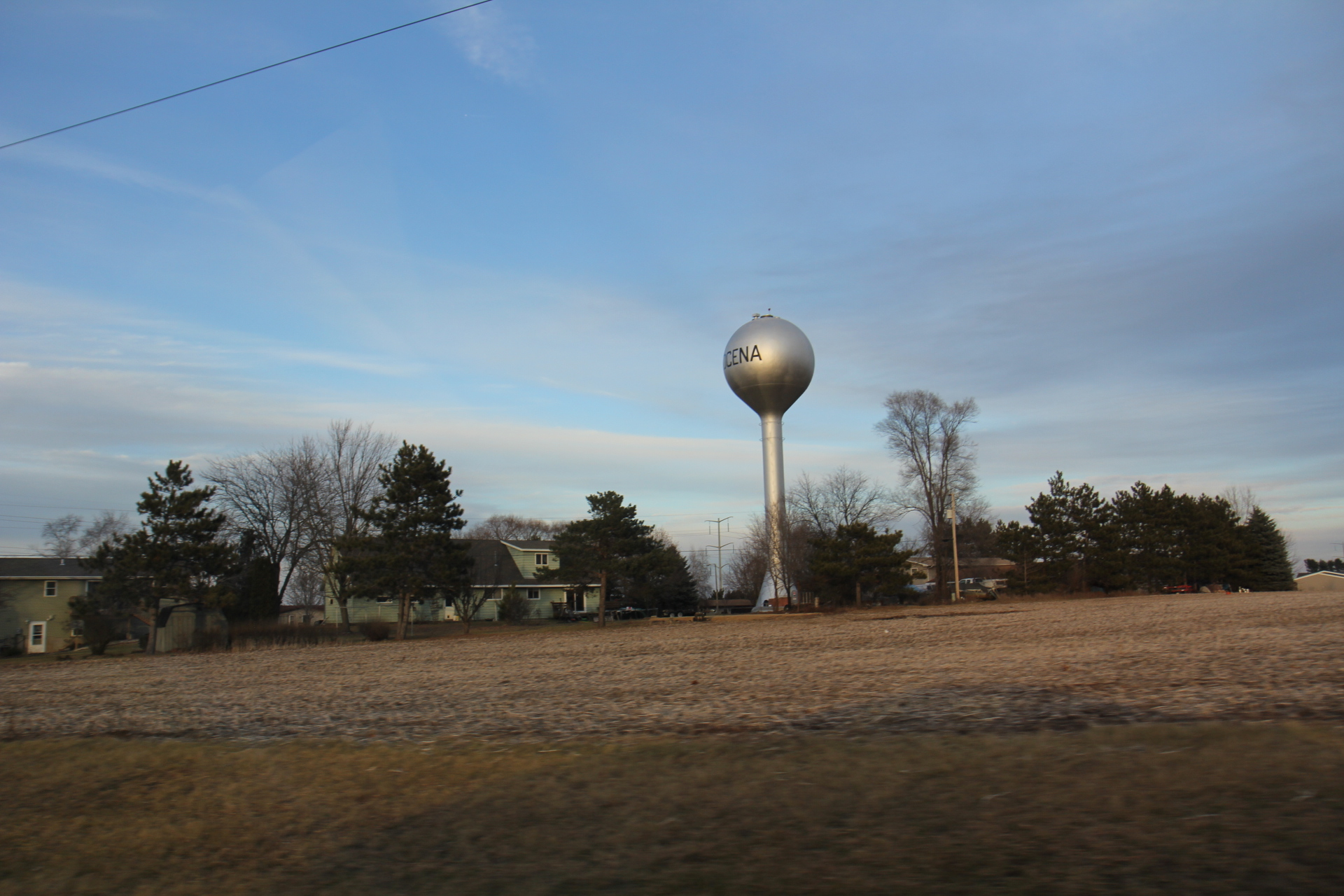
Housing and the water tower for Wyocena

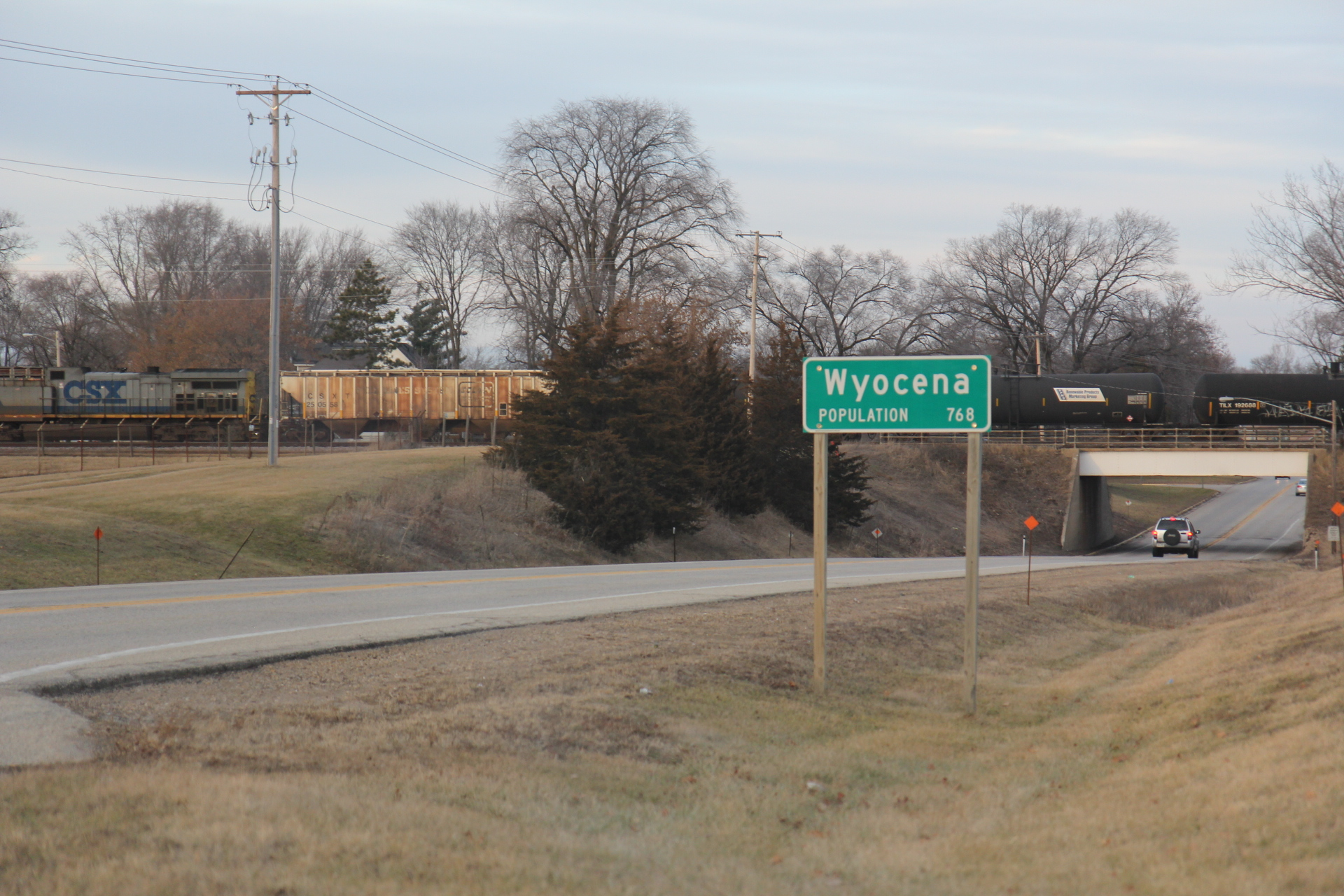
The sign for Wyocena on WIS 22

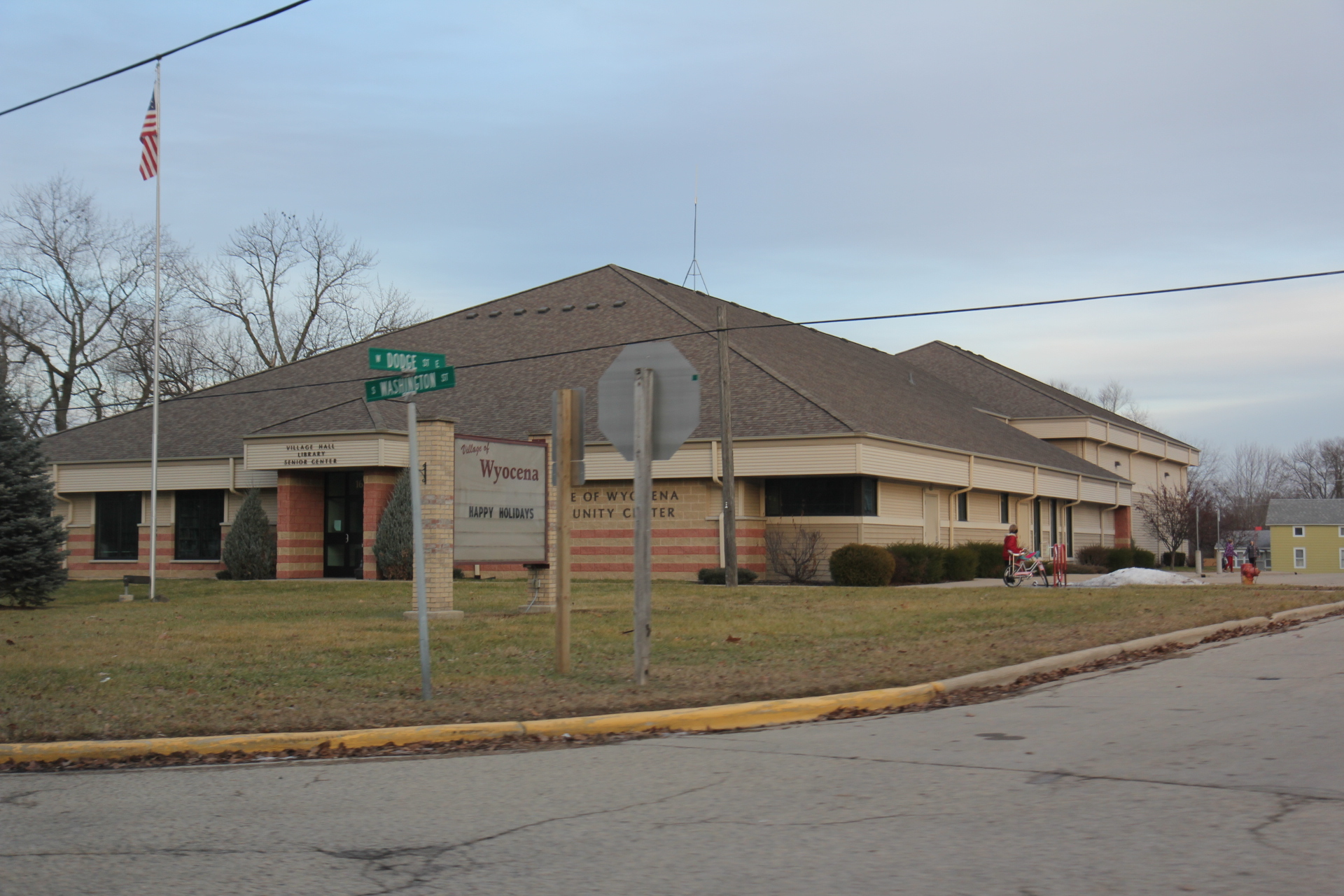
The community center in Wyocena

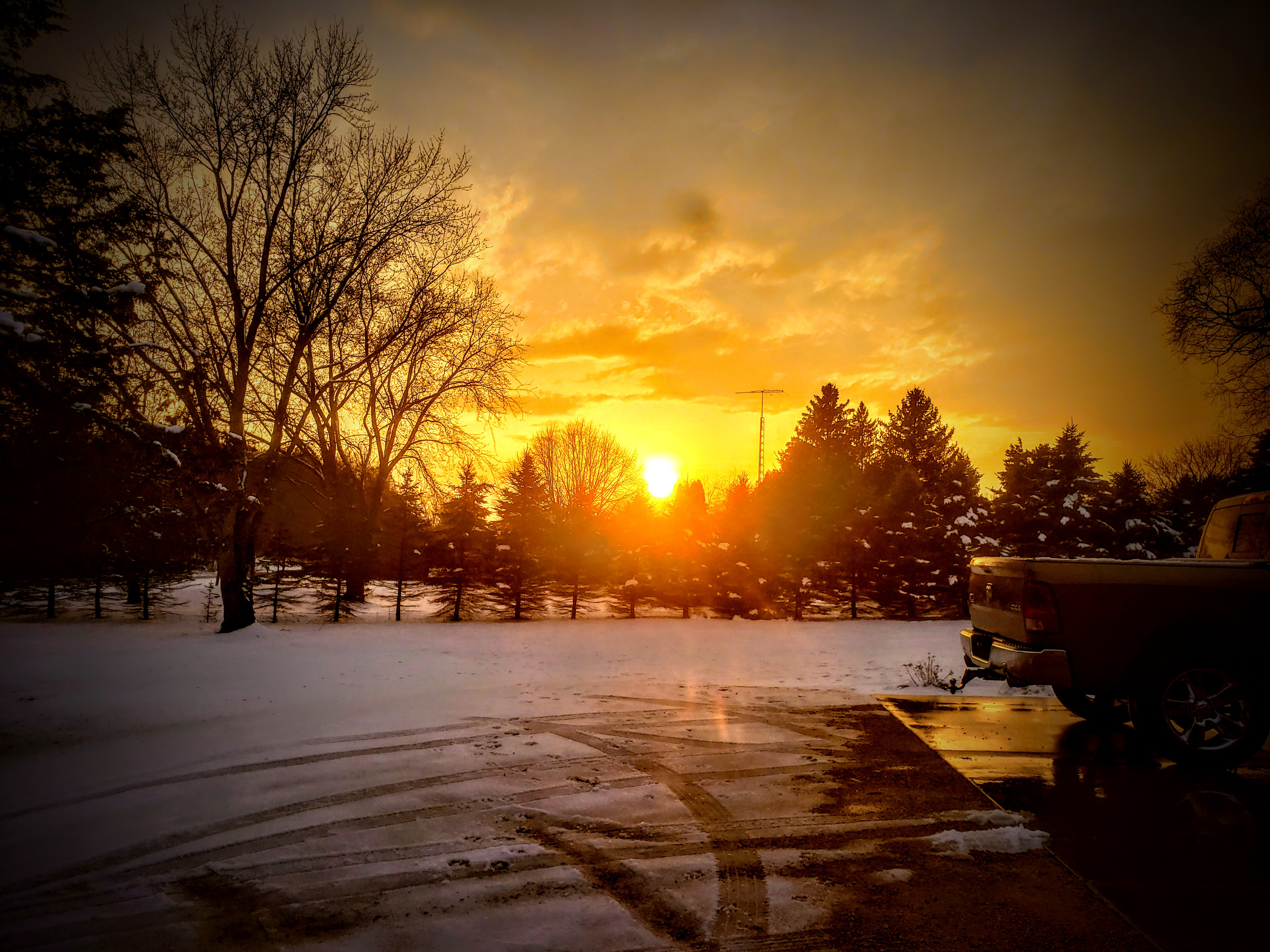
Wyocena at dusk
