= Everett Bidwell =

American politician

Member of the Wisconsin Senate from the 27th district
- In office January 3, 1971 – January 3, 1983
- Preceded by: Walter E. Terry
- Succeeded by: Russ Feingold

Personal details
- Born: October 22, 1899 Houston, Minnesota
- Died: January 7, 1991 (aged 91) Portage, Wisconsin
- Party: Republican

Everett V. "Cy" Bidwell (October 22, 1899 – January 7, 1991) was a Wisconsin politician who served as a member of the Wisconsin State Assembly and Wisconsin Senate, serving the 27th District of Wisconsin.

== Early life ==
Born in a log cabin in Houston, Minnesota, on October 22, 1899, Bidwell was the eldest of seven children. He was raised on a small farm, and at the age of sixteen was left with his father to raise the family when his mother died. Bidwell attended the University of Minnesota and served on the Columbia County Board of Supervisors for ten years. He was a farmer and an ice cream manufacturer.

== Career ==
A member of the Republican Party, Bidwell was elected to the Wisconsin State Assembly from 1953 to 1967 and served in the Wisconsin State Senate from 1971 to 1983.

During his years in the Wisconsin State Legislature, Bidwell earned the reputation as an "Irishman with a short fuse and an inability to carry a grudge for very long."

While serving in the State Senate, Bidwell was the oldest serving legislator in the state. As a Wisconsin state senator, Bidwell served as the chairman of the Committee on industry, labor, taxation, and banking and the Senate Committee on Commerce during the 1970s.

Bidwell was defeated for reelection by future United States Senator Russell Feingold. On the November 2, 1982 Senate Election day against Russ Feingold, Bidwell was declared the winner by a 19 vote margin. The recount started the day after the election and continued for three weeks. Two days after the election, Sauk County, Wisconsin, uncovered 64 votes for Feingold that had not been counted on election night. Over forty additional votes for Feingold were also found on a broken voting machine in a North Madison school. The lead see-sawed back and forth until the very end. When all the votes had been recounted, in what was considered a major Republican Party of Wisconsin upset, Feingold defeated Bidwell by just 31 votes.

== Death ==
Bidwell died at Divine Savior Hospital in Portage, Wisconsin, on January 7, 1991, from unspecified causes.

Wisconsin Senate
| Preceded by Walter Terry | Member of the Wisconsin Senate for the 27th district 1971–1983 | Succeeded by Russ Feingold |
