= Springfield, Marquette County, Wisconsin =

Springfield, Wisconsin
- Town
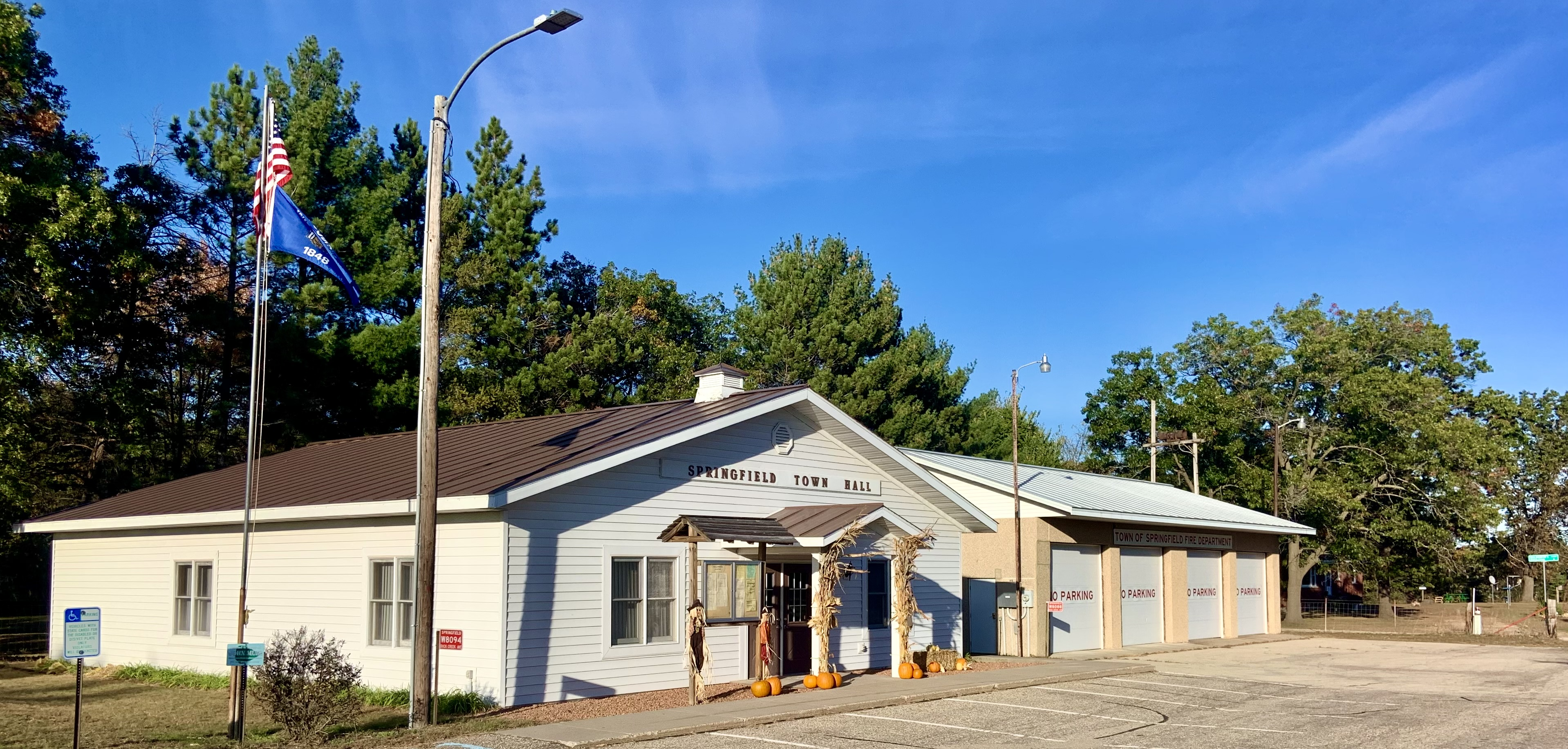
- Town hall

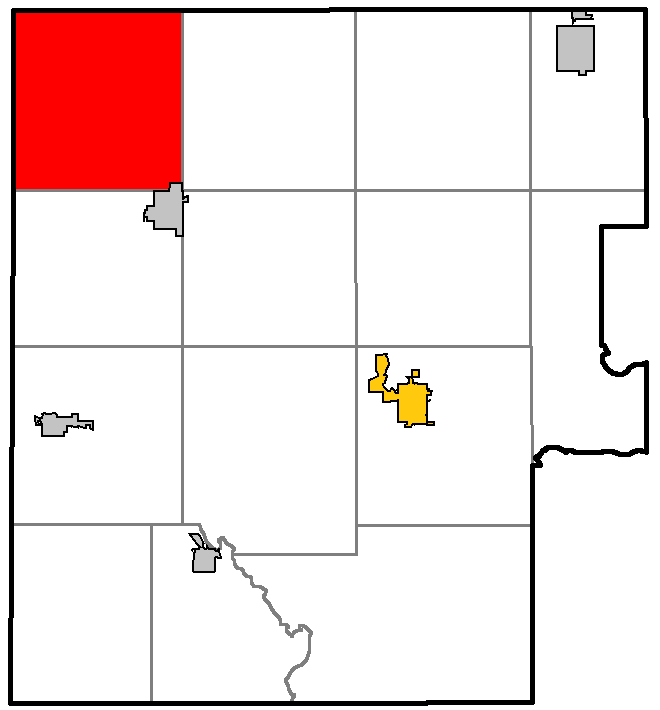
- Location of Springfield, Marquette County, Wisconsin

- Location of Marquette County, Wisconsin
- Coordinates: 43°56′49″N 89°31′57″W
- Country: United States
- State: Wisconsin
- County: Marquette

Area
  - Total: 34.9 sq mi (90.5 km^{2})
  - Land: 34.6 sq mi (89.6 km^{2})
  - Water: 0.35 sq mi (0.9 km^{2})
- Elevation: 932 ft (284 m)

Population (2020)
  - Total: 811
  - Density: 18/sq mi (7/km^{2})
- Time zone: UTC-6 (Central (CST))
  - Summer (DST): UTC-5 (CDT)
- FIPS code: 55-75925
- GNIS feature ID: 1584194
- Website: townofspringfieldwi.org

Springfield is a town in Marquette County, Wisconsin, United States. The population was 811 at the 2020 census.

== Geography ==
According to the United States Census Bureau, the town has a total area of 34.9 square miles (90.5 km^{2}), of which 34.6 square miles (89.6 km^{2}) is land and 0.3 square miles (0.9 km^{2}) (0.97%) is water.

== Demographics ==
As of the census of 2000, there were 628 people, 273 households, and 188 families residing in the town. The population density was 18.1 people per square mile (7.0/km^{2}). There were 542 housing units at an average density of 15.7 per square mile (6.0/km^{2}). The racial makeup of the town was 97.29% White, 1.75% Native American, 0.48% from other races, and 0.48% from two or more races. Hispanic or Latino people of any race were 1.27% of the population.

There were 273 households, out of which 25.3% had children under the age of 18 living with them, 63.0% were married couples living together, 2.9% had a female householder with no husband present, and 31.1% were non-families. 27.8% of all households were made up of individuals, and 12.8% had someone living alone who was 65 years of age or older. The average household size was 2.30 and the average family size was 2.82.

In the town, the population was spread out, with 19.9% under the age of 18, 5.6% from 18 to 24, 23.4% from 25 to 44, 33.4% from 45 to 64, and 17.7% who were 65 years of age or older. The median age was 46 years. For every 100 females, there were 107.9 males. For every 100 females age 18 and over, there were 107.0 males.

The median income for a household in the town was $35,109, and the median income for a family was $41,875. Males had a median income of $30,750 versus $21,250 for females. The per capita income for the town was $17,593. About 6.2% of families and 10.3% of the population were below the poverty line, including 8.8% of those under age 18 and 14.3% of those age 65 or over.

== Education ==
It is part of the Westfield School District.
