= Charles L. Dering =

American politician

Charles Lewis Dering (December 3, 1836 – April 10, 1921) was an American lawyer and politician.

== Biography ==
Charles L. Dering was born in Sunbury, Pennsylvania on December 3, 1836. He moved to New Diggings, Wisconsin in 1849. Dering went to what is now University of Wisconsin–Platteville and then to Hobart and William Smith Colleges. He went to Texas in 1859 and returned to Wisconsin in 1861. He served in the 3rd Wisconsin Volunteer Infantry Regiment during the American Civil War and was badly wounded. Dering then practiced law in Columbus, Wisconsin and was United States assistant assessor. He married Sarah Adaline Maxwell in Waterford on October 7, 1874.

Dering served in the Wisconsin State Senate in 1879 and 1880 as a Republican. He then moved to Portage, Wisconsin in 1880, where he died.
