= Greenfield, Sauk County, Wisconsin =

Town in Sauk County, Wisconsin, United States

Town of Greenfield, Wisconsin
- Town
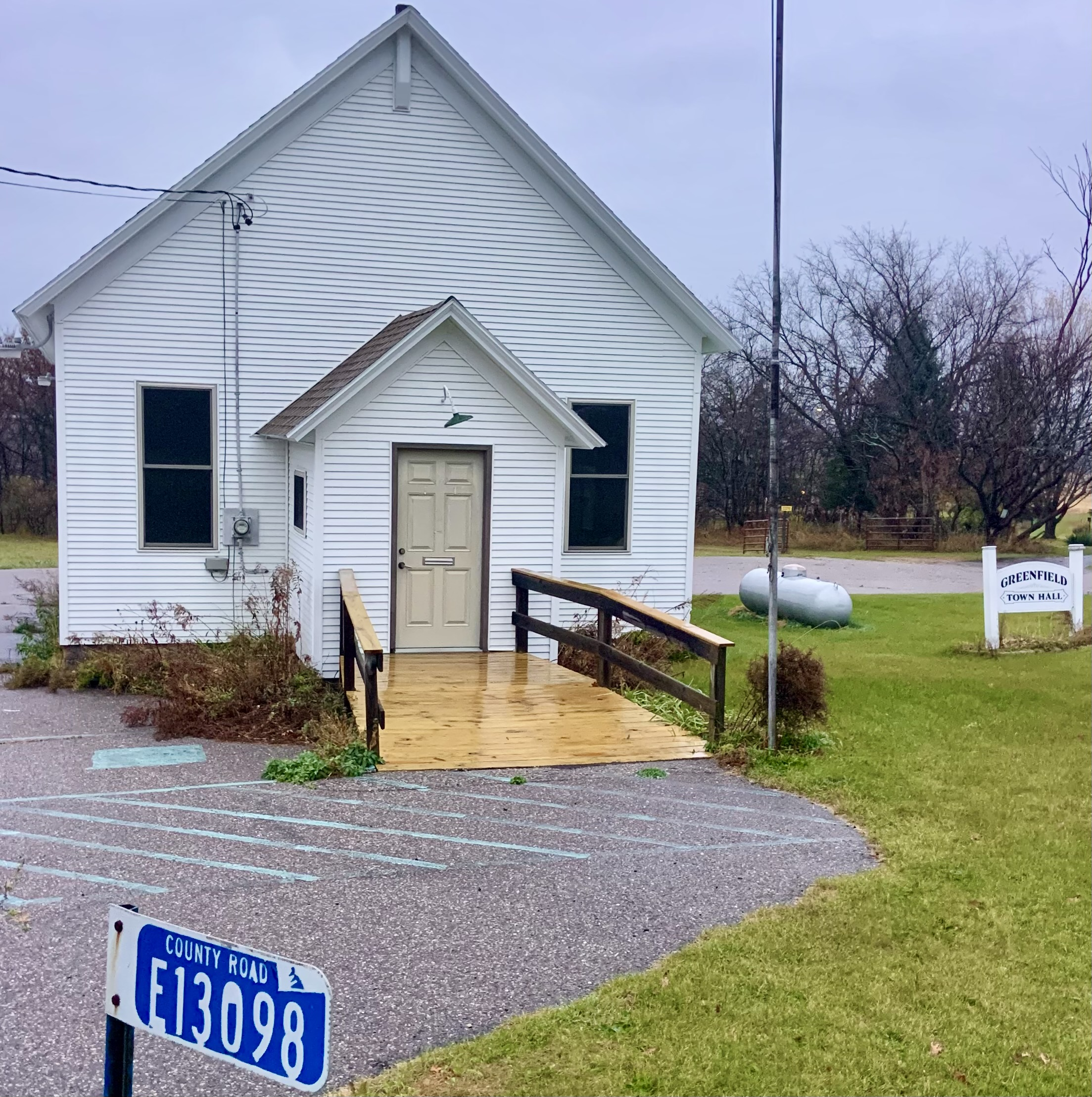
- Town hall

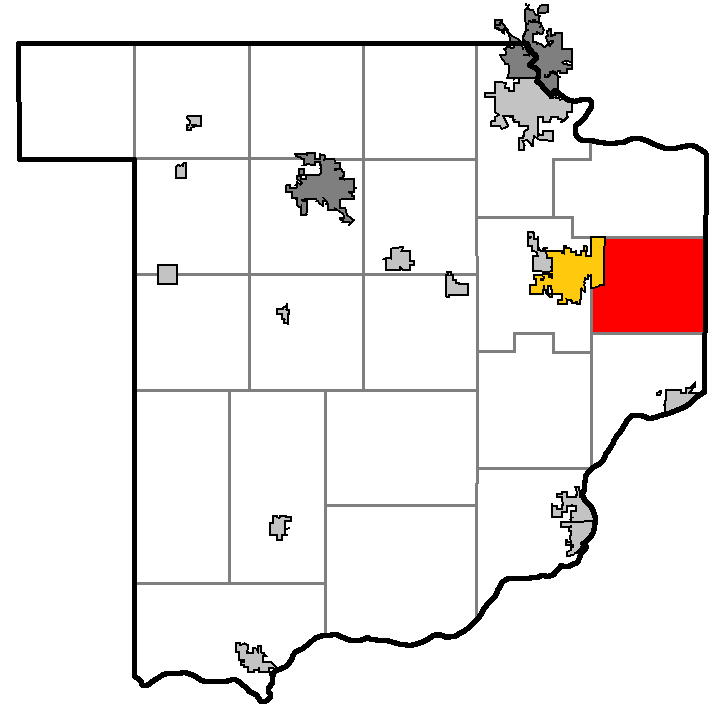
- Location of the Town of Greenfield, Sauk County, Wisconsin

- Location of Sauk County, Wisconsin
- Coordinates: 43°28′18″N 89°39′43″W
- Country: United States
- State: Wisconsin
- County: Sauk

Area
  - Total: 29.7 sq mi (76.8 km^{2})
  - Land: 29.7 sq mi (76.8 km^{2})
  - Water: 0 sq mi (0.0 km^{2})
- Elevation: 810 ft (247 m)

Population (2020)
  - Total: 909
  - Density: 31/sq mi (11.9/km^{2})
- Time zone: UTC-6 (Central (CST))
  - Summer (DST): UTC-5 (CDT)
- Area code: 608
- FIPS code: 55-31250
- GNIS feature ID: 1583316
- Website: https://greenfieldsaukwi.org/

The Town of Greenfield is a located in Sauk County, Wisconsin, United States. The population was 909 at the 2020 census. The town was named after Greenfield, Massachusetts.

== Geography ==
According to the United States Census Bureau, the town has a total area of 29.7 square miles (76.8 km^{2}), all land.

== Demographics ==
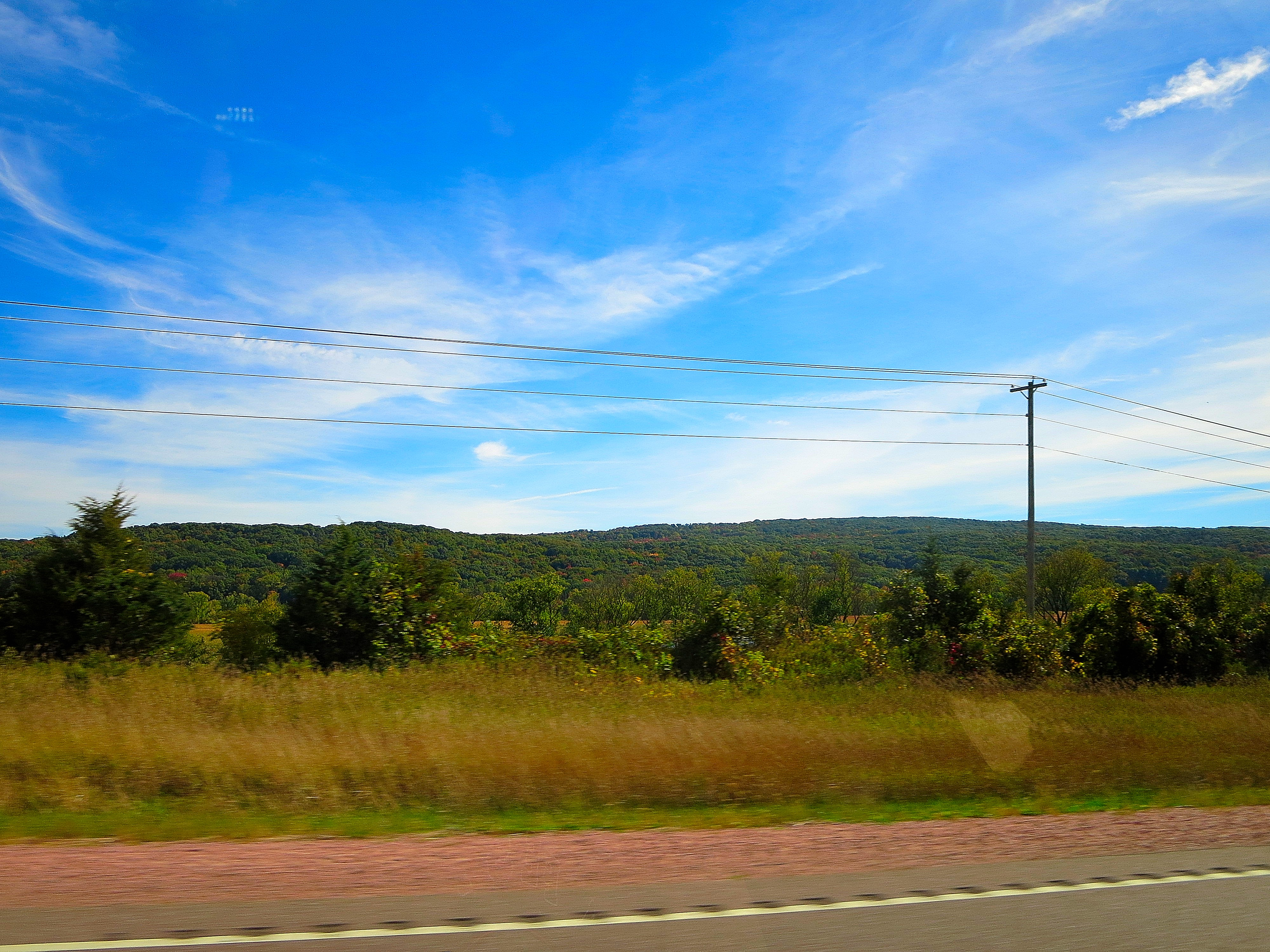
The Buried Mountain Range in Greenfield, September 2013

At the 2000 census there were 911 people in 351 households, including 259 families, in the town. The population density was 30.7 people per square mile (11.9/km^{2}). There were 384 housing units at an average density of 12.9 per square mile (5.0/km^{2}). The racial makeup of the town was 98.24% White, 0.66% African American, 0.11% Native American, 0.22% from other races, and 0.77% from two or more races. Hispanic or Latino of any race were 0.66%.

Of the 351 households 30.5% had children under the age of 18 living with them, 63.8% were married couples living together, 4.8% had a female householder with no husband present, and 26.2% were non-families. 20.2% of households were one person and 7.4% were one person aged 65 or older. The average household size was 2.60 and the average family size was 3.00.

The age distribution was 25.1% under the age of 18, 7.1% from 18 to 24, 31.7% from 25 to 44, 25.5% from 45 to 64, and 10.5% 65 or older. The median age was 38 years. For every 100 females, there were 98.9 males. For every 100 females age 18 and over, there were 104.2 males.

The median household income was $49,659 and the median family income was $55,625. Males had a median income of $35,197 versus $24,091 for females. The per capita income for the town was $20,926. About 1.2% of families and 2.4% of the population were below the poverty line, including none of those under age 18 and 6.0% of those age 65 or over.

== See also ==
- List of towns in Wisconsin
