= William G. Bissell =

American politician

William George Bissell (September 18, 1857 – March 1925) was a member of the Wisconsin State Senate.

== Biography ==
Bissell was born on September 18, 1857, in Massena, New York. He moved with his parents to Lodi, Wisconsin, in the spring of 1866. Bissell worked as a farmer, singing school teacher, and traveling salesman before becoming a general merchant in 1896. He married Eva Stella Sisson (1860–1937). Bissell died in March 1925 and is interred in Baraboo, Wisconsin.

== Senate career ==
In the fall of 1898 Bissell was nominated for the state senate by the Republicans of the twenty-seventh district, comprising Columbia and Sauk counties, and he was elected over Edmund S. Baker, the candidate of the democrats and James M. Blachly, the candidate of the Prohibitionists. Bissell represented the 27th District in the Senate from 1899 to 1902. Bissell served on the committees on state affairs, manufacturers and agriculture of the senate.
