= Buffalo, Marquette County, Wisconsin =

Buffalo, Wisconsin
- Town
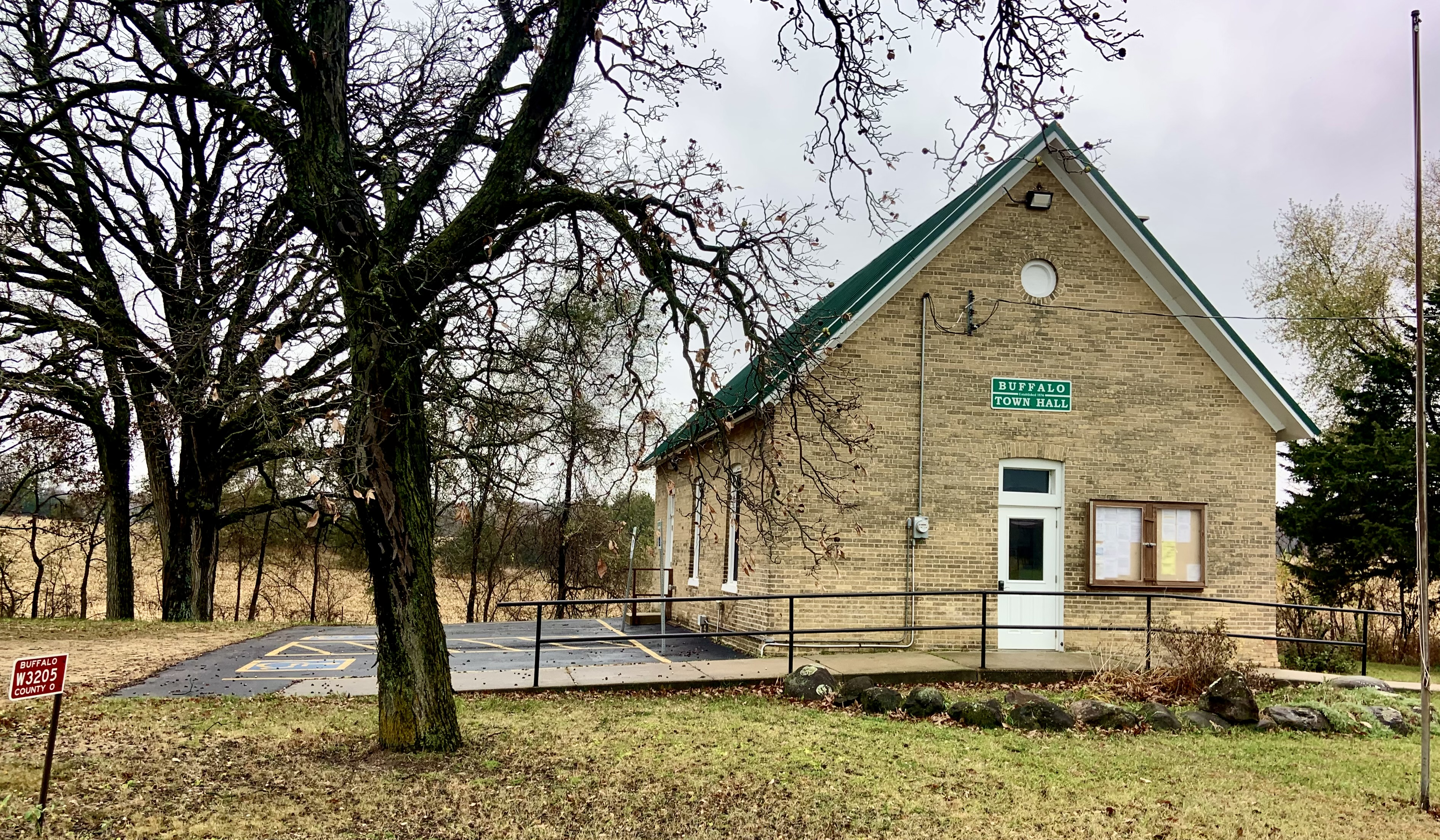
- Town hall
- Motto: "The Boyhood Home of John Muir"
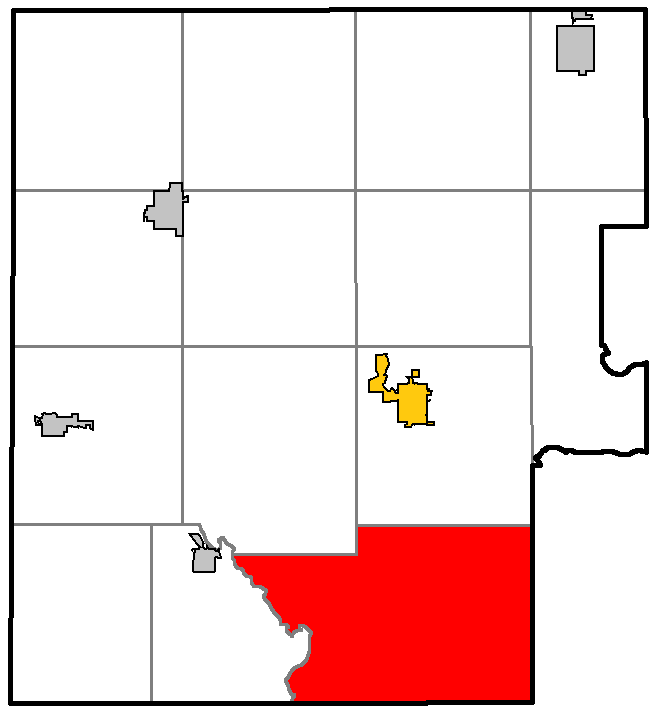
- Location of Buffalo, Marquette County, Wisconsin

- Location of Marquette County, Wisconsin
- Coordinates: 43°41′10″N 89°19′45″W
- Country: United States
- State: Wisconsin
- County: Marquette

Area
  - Total: 49.3 sq mi (127.6 km^{2})
  - Land: 48.5 sq mi (125.7 km^{2})
  - Water: 0.73 sq mi (1.9 km^{2})
- Elevation: 846 ft (258 m)

Population (2020)
  - Total: 1,389
  - Density: 28.62/sq mi (11.05/km^{2})
- Time zone: UTC-6 (Central (CST))
  - Summer (DST): UTC-5 (CDT)
- FIPS code: 55-11050
- GNIS feature ID: 1582886
- Website: Town of Buffalo, Marquette County, Wisconsin

Buffalo is a town in Marquette County, Wisconsin, United States. As of the 2020 census, the town population was 1,389.

== Geography ==
According to the United States Census Bureau, the town has a total area of 49.3 square miles (127.6 km^{2}), of which 48.5 square miles (125.7 km^{2}) is land and 0.8 square mile (1.9 km^{2}) (1.52%) is water.

== Demographics ==
As of the census of 2000, there were 1,085 people, 412 households, and 306 families residing in the town. The population density was 22.4 people per square mile (8.6/km^{2}). There were 461 housing units at an average density of 9.5 per square mile (3.7/km^{2}). The racial makeup of the town was 97.24% White, 0.09% African American, 0.28% Native American, 0.18% Asian, 0.74% from other races, and 1.47% from two or more races. Hispanic or Latino people of any race were 1.84% of the population.

There were 412 households, out of which 32.3% had children under the age of 18 living with them, 61.2% were married couples living together, 6.8% had a female householder with no husband present, and 25.5% were non-families. 17.5% of all households were made up of individuals, and 6.8% had someone living alone who was 65 years of age or older. The average household size was 2.63 and the average family size was 2.99.

In the town, the population was spread out, with 25.4% under the age of 18, 6.5% from 18 to 24, 29.8% from 25 to 44, 24.4% from 45 to 64, and 13.8% who were 65 years of age or older. The median age was 38 years. For every 100 females, there were 105.9 males. For every 100 females age 18 and over, there were 105.3 males.

The median income for a household in the town was $38,594, and the median income for a family was $44,044. Males had a median income of $30,761 versus $22,500 for females. The per capita income for the town was $17,009. About 6.3% of families and 9.4% of the population were below the poverty line, including 13.2% of those under age 18 and 7.4% of those age 65 or over.
