= Russell C. Falconer =

American politician

Russell Chamberlain Falconer (February 4, 1851 – December 15, 1936) was a member of the Wisconsin State Senate.

== Biography ==
Falconer was born on February 4, 1851, in Williamsburg, New York. He moved to Quincy, Wisconsin, in 1855 or to Pardeeville, Wisconsin, in 1856 and to Columbia County, Wisconsin, in 1858. He married Ada Scott (1851–1922) in 1870 and they had one daughter. They relocated to Portage, Wisconsin, in 1887. Falconer moved to California in 1920, initially to an orange farm in Sunnyslope and later to San Bernardino. Falconer died at his home in Patton, California, on December 15, 1936.

== Career ==
Falconer was chairman of Wyocena, Wisconsin, in 1880. From 1887 to 1888, he was sheriff of Columbia County. After being a delegate at the 1888 Democratic National Convention, Falconer was Mayor of Portage, Wisconsin, from 1890 to 1892. He was elected to the Senate in 1890 and appointed to the education committee. Later, Falconer was elected Sergeant at Arms of the Senate in 1905 and 1907.
