= Walter Schmidt (Wisconsin politician) =

20th century American politician

Walter R. Schmidt

Chairman of the Board of Supervisors of Sheboygan County, Wisconsin
- In office April 16, 1963 – April 16, 1968
- Preceded by: Robert J. Baden
- Succeeded by: Walter Ireland

Member of the Wisconsin State Assembly from the Sheboygan 1st district
- In office January 7, 1957 – January 5, 1959
- Preceded by: Fred E. Nuernberg
- Succeeded by: Henry A. Hillemann

Personal details
- Born: December 22, 1898 Sheboygan Falls, Wisconsin, U.S.
- Died: June 10, 1987 (aged 88) Morningside Nursing Home Sheboygan, Wisconsin, U.S.
- Resting place: Wildwood Cemetery, Sheboygan
- Party: Republican
- Spouse: Rubina Damrow (m. 1920–1987)
- Occupation: Farmer, cheesemaker, real estate broker

Walter R. Schmidt (December 22, 1898 – June 10, 1987) was an American farmer, cheesemaker, real estate broker, and Republican politician from Sheboygan, Wisconsin. He served one term in the Wisconsin State Assembly, representing the city of Sheboygan during the 1957 session. He also served more than 22 years on the Sheboygan County board of supervisors, and was chairman from 1963 through 1968.

== Biography ==
Walter Schmidt was born December 22, 1898, in the town of Sheboygan Falls, Wisconsin. From an early age, he worked on his family farm, and at age 20 he became the owner and operator of the Greenbaum Cheese Factory, which manufactured cheese from nearby dairy farms. Through the cheese industry, he also became active in the Wisconsin Cheesemakers Association.

He also became involved in local affairs as a member of the school board. In 1929, he became an officer in the Sheboygan Falls Rural Telephone Company. And after the outbreak of World War II, he served on the county rationing board. In 1946, he left the cheesemaking business and went into real estate dealing, which was his primary occupation for the rest of his career.

In 1949, he was elected to the Sheboygan County board of supervisors, and would serve continuously on the board for the next 22 years. In 1956, Sheboygan's incumbent state representative, Fred E. Nuernberg, announced he would not run for another term. The county's Republican Party establishment rallied around Schmidt, who at the time was gaining statewide notoriety as president of the Wisconsin county highway committee members association. With the support of the party, he faced no opposition in the primary, and went on to face Democrat Allan J. Graskamp. Graskamp was the president of the UAW Local at Kohler Co., and at the time of the 1956 primary, Graskamp was leading his union in a strike at that plant. Schmidt prevailed in the general election, receiving 54% of the vote.

Schmidt ran for re-election to the Assembly in 1958, but was defeated by Henry A. Hillemann, as the Democrats won their first Assembly majority in 26 years.

Schmidt continued as a member of the county board through his term in the Assembly. In 1962, he was elected vice-chairman of the county board, and the following year he was elected chairman. He served five years as chairman, relinquishing the office in 1968. He remained on the county board until his retirement in 1972.

== Personal life and family ==
Walter Schmidt was the fourth of five sons born to Edward Schmidt and his wife Julia (née Meinnert). Both of Schmidt's parents were first generation Americans born to German American immigrants.

Walter Schmidt married Rubina Damrow at St. Luke's Lutheran Church in Sheboygan Falls, on January 3, 1920. The Damrow family were also prominent farmers and local officeholders in the Sheboygan Falls area. They were married for 67 years, but had no children.

Walter Schmidt died at Morningside Nursery Home in Sheboygan on June 10, 1987, at age 88. He was buried at Sheboygan's Wildwood Cemetery.

== Electoral history ==
=== Wisconsin Assembly (1956, 1958) ===
Wisconsin Assembly, Sheboygan 1st District Election, 1956
Party	Candidate	Votes	%	±%
General Election, November 6, 1956
Republican	Walter R. Schmidt	10,730	53.71%	+3.32pp
Democratic	Allan J. Graskamp	9,247	46.29%	
Plurality		1,483	7.42%	+6.63pp
Total votes		19,977	100.0%	+13.63%
Republican hold				

Wisconsin Assembly, Sheboygan 1st District Election, 1958
Party	Candidate	Votes	%	±%
General Election, November 4, 1958
Democratic	Henry A. Hillemann	9,358	55.03%	
Republican	Walter R. Schmidt (incumbent)	7,646	44.97%	−8.75pp
Plurality		1,712	10.07%	+2.64pp
Total votes		17,004	100.0%	-14.88%
Democratic gain from Republican				

Wisconsin State Assembly
Preceded by Fred E. Nuernberg	Member of the Wisconsin State Assembly from the Sheboygan 1st district January 7, 1957 – January 5, 1959	Succeeded by Henry A. Hillemann
Political offices
Preceded by Robert J. Baden	Chairman of the Board of Supervisors of Sheboygan County, Wisconsin; April 16, 1963 – April 16, 1968	Succeeded by Walter Ireland
