= William Weeks (disambiguation) =

William Weeks may refer to:

- William Weeks (1813–1900), architect of the Church of Jesus Christ of Latter Day Saints
- William E. Weeks (1880–1972), American attorney and politician
- William Farrar Weeks (1859–1914), coadjutor bishop of the Episcopal Diocese of Vermont
- William C. Weeks, architect in Wisconsin
- W. H. Weeks (William Henry Weeks, 1864–1936), architect

== See also ==
- William Weekes (died 1806), lawyer and political figure in Upper Canada
- William Weekes (priest) (1867–1945), Dean of Bloemfontein, South Africa
- Willie Weeks, Bass guitarist
