= Detling (surname) =

Detling is a surname. Notable people with the surname include:

- John M. Detling (1880–1948), American politician, son of Valentine
- Valentine Detling (1843–1920), American businessman and politician
