= Krez =

Krez is a surname. Notable people with the surname include:

- Conrad Krez (1828–1897), German politician and military officer
- Frederick W. Krez (1899–1969), American politician and businessman

== See also ==
- Krez (instrument)
