= WSHS (FM) =

High school radio station in Sheboygan, Wisconsin

Semi-satellite of WHID Green Bay
- Sheboygan, Wisconsin; United States
- Broadcast area: Sheboygan and surrounding communities
- Frequency: 91.7 (MHz)
- Branding: 91.7 FM WSHS

Programming
- Format: Variety
- Affiliations: Wisconsin Public Radio Music; NPR

Ownership
- Owner: Sheboygan Area School District

History
- First air date: 1968; 58 years ago
- Call sign meaning: Sheboygan High School

Technical information
- Licensing authority: FCC
- Facility ID: 60041
- Class: A
- ERP: 175 watts
- HAAT: 26 meters
- Transmitter coordinates: 43.776610°N 87.718105°W

Links
- Public license information: Public file; LMS
- Website: www.sheboygan.k12.wi.us/north-high/activities/wshs

WSHS (91.7) is a student-run high school radio and public radio station operating on a non-commercial educational license in Sheboygan, Wisconsin. Owned by the Sheboygan Area School District, the station's studio is located on the second floor of Sheboygan North High School on the city's north side, and its transmitter is located in the central courtyard of the North High building. An auxiliary studio is also located at Sheboygan South High School, though most programming originates out of North High. The station's signal covers most of Sheboygan and portions of Kohler and the towns of Mosel, Sheboygan and Wilson, and is also simulcast as the audio on public access station WSCS outside programming hours, which is carried on Spectrum and AT&T U-verse systems in Sheboygan, Fond du Lac and Washington Counties.

== History ==
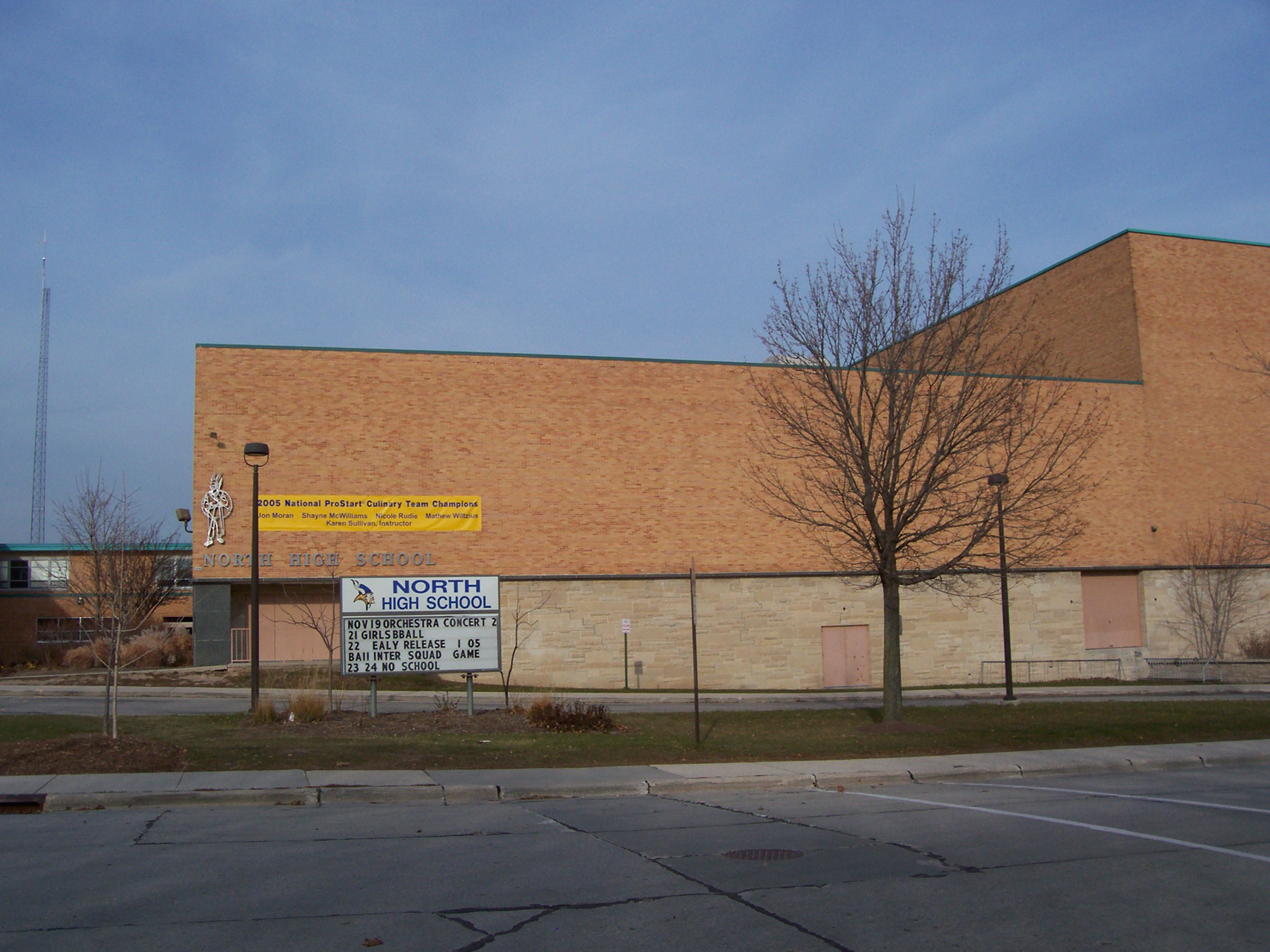
WSHS' transmitter tower is seen to the left in this photo of North High School's auditorium wing.

The station came on the air in 1968, and was the first high school radio station in the state of Wisconsin. Under the direction of North High French/Radio teacher, the late Jerrold Molepske, some local and state personalities had their starts on the air of WSHS, like former Milwaukee radio host WTMJ Radio (620)'s Gene Mueller and Dick Alpert, formerly traffic reporter and director for iHeartMedia's Madison and Milwaukee radio clusters, and for television partner WITI (Channel 6) in Milwaukee. Locally, WHBL/WHBZ (1330/106.5))'s Josh Dekker had his start during "South Nights" in the mid-1990s.

During the school year, the station runs a music format from 8am-6pm CST, which is run by broadcasting students at North with a variety of genres played, including Top 40, soft rock, alternative music, and some hard rock, with its longtime slogan being "Where variety is the sound". As the station is also an educational tool for the students, WSHS also runs news briefs, weather forecasts and fact segments (such as trivia questions, "Today in History", and "Birthdays") at various times throughout the day, along with taking requests via the phone and an in-studio fax machine (NPR News is also broadcast at the top of every hour in student-operated hours). All of the station's DJs are required to take two semesters of broadcasting classes, go through an application process, and be selected by the station manager before they can have an on-air shift on the station (requirements have been adjusted over the years; before the Telecommunications Act of 1996, a non-commercial FCC license was required for a student to take to the airwaves). Formerly the station broadcast both North and South high school athletics play-by-play with student commentary, though this role has been ceded in recent years to web broadcasts produced by each school.

== Programming ==
After school hours, the station serves as the Sheboygan affiliate of the Ideas Network of Wisconsin Public Radio (WPR), which has a talk format, and acts mainly as a repeater of the schedule for WPR's Green Bay station, WHID (88.1). This was begun in the fall of 2000 to provide full-time programming for the station, as local translators for religious broadcasters began to fill the lower band of Sheboygan's radio dial, making reception of the Ideas Network's Milwaukee area affiliate, WHAD (90.7) (based in Delafield, a further location than the common tower farm on Milwaukee's east side) near impossible except for car radio reception. Family Radio's station WMWK, also on 88.1, from Milwaukee, makes most reception of WHID in the area impossible, though WSHS uses a mix of a satellite feed and tower reception of WHID with WMWK's transmission filtered out depending on conditions to translate the station. The full-time schedule also made any attempt for a religious organization to challenge a license renewal and claim the frequency from the Sheboygan Area School District due to lack of service unlikely, a strategy attempted with WEPS in Elgin, Illinois, which has also since used WPR Ideas Network programming to fill non-school hours. The station was switched to the new WPR Music network in May 2024, with the Ideas Network programming (now known as WPR News) moving to Green Bay's WPNE (89.3), which has no interference in the Sheboygan area.

During the latter part of the week, ethnic broadcasters air their programming on the station. A Hmong language talk/music program to serve the local Hmong population locally originated from the local Hmong Mutual Assistance Association since 1983 and hosted by Vue Yang airs on Thursdays after 4:30 pm, while a local Spanish program consisting of mostly music airs on Friday or Saturday mornings. During the summer, Mead Public Library leases time on the station on Thursday evenings to broadcast live concerts from the stage of the nearby City Green, in cooperation with the John Michael Kohler Arts Center (this audio is simulcast through the library's Live365 stream). The locally originated ethnic programs broker their time from the school district to carry their programming.

== See also ==
- Sheboygan North High School
- Sheboygan Area School District
