= Plaza 8 =

Pedestrian mall in Sheboygan, Wisconsin, U.S.

- Pedestrian mall
- {{{other_names}}}
- Features: Fountain
- Opened: July 8, 1976
- Cost: $1.55 million
- Surface: Green space, bricks
- Owner: City of Sheboygan
- Location: North 8th Street (formally Plaza 8) Sheboygan, Wisconsin
- Location within Wisconsin
- Coordinates: 43°45′13″N 87°42′46″W
- Website: www.harborcentre.com

Plaza 8 (now known simply as Downtown Sheboygan) was a pedestrian mall located in Downtown Sheboygan, Wisconsin. The mall stretched three and half city blocks in length from Ontario Avenue south past New York Avenue on North 8th Street. The area is now the Harbor Centre Downtown.

== History ==
The Sheboygan Redevelopment Authority was created in 1966 by the city's Common Council and was responsible for the redevelopment of the downtown. A master plan developed that year for rebuilding the downtown proposed a pedestrian plaza. The federal government approved the project in 1972 and timed with the 1974 completion of the new Mead Public Library, construction was completed in 1976, with official dedication and opening of the project coming during United States Bicentennial activities in July 1976. Plaza 8 was funded by the Federal Urban Renewal Agency and by the City of Sheboygan.

The project was considered a failure by most standards, isolating the downtown area from the rest of the city, with large parking lots to accommodate expected visitors leaving Seventh and Ninth Streets (the main ways around Plaza 8) without buildings along them, and leaving the four-block area mostly quiet. The Sheboygan Transit transfer point at the south end of the project effectively blocked off trade in the block that it covered during transfer times and owners in the block found no purpose in maintaining their buildings discolored by heavy vehicle fumes and soot, leaving them in a derelict condition. Retail sales in the area did not improve and by 1989, a third of the area was vacant, with buildings condemned and torn down (with a couple used for the Jaycees' longtime haunted house fund-raising effort during that time). Plaza 8 was one of the last large projects financed by the Federal Urban Renewal Agency.

Besides Prange's, the main strip of the mall was home to 16 retail shops and the entire side of one block was a vacant lot. The mall was removed in 1990 and traffic reintroduced to the Eighth Street corridor through the next three years, with the area renamed "Harbor Centre Downtown" in line with the city's new marketing effort for the downtown and north riverfront areas. The transfer point was shuffled around during those years until it found a permanent home a half-block west of the former on-street site a few years later. Since then, the City of Sheboygan has created the Harbor Centre Business Improvement District to manage the downtown, riverfront and recently developed South Pier District.

The plaza was home to Prange's, Walgreens and numerous local stores and restaurants. The original Prange's building would stand until a flood rendered it too damaged to save. Prange's rebuilt a new store on the same site. In 1992, the store name was changed after Younkers purchased the H.C. Prange Company.

=== Water main break and fires ===
The 74-year-old building that housed Prange's was damaged by a water main break in May 1983 after the building's support columns sagged. The building was in the process of being torn down when fire destroyed the store on October 16, 1983. Authorizes suggested the cause of the fire was arson. Burning debris caused damage to the City Hall and St. Clement's school gymnasium. The core of the building was built in 1909 and was expanded five times since then, the last time in 1969 and contained 235,000 square feet of retail space. It also served as headquarters for the Prange and Prange Way stores in Wisconsin, Michigan and Illinois.

The building was reconstructed in 1984. As of 2014, the arsonist has never been caught and the fire remains one of Sheboygan's most prominent cold cases.

=== Future ===
A Boston Store occupied the building of the former Prange's and Younkers closed in 2013. The building sat vacant for more than a year, before being purchased by the City of Sheboygan in 2014. Demolition of the store, located directly across from the fountain and Mead Public Library, was completed in March 2015.

The city used the site in the summer 2015 as greenspace for local concerts sponsored by the John Michael Kohler Arts Center. City Green, which connects the arts center and library, opened in 2018.

=== Sheboygan City Centre ===
Sheboygan City Centre
- Interactive map of the Sheboygan City Centre area
- Alternative names: Sheboygan City Center

General information
- Status: Never built
- Location: Downtown Sheboygan/Plaza 8, Sheboygan, Wisconsin
- Construction started: 1986
- Cost: $100 million (projected)

Technical details
- Floor count: 15

Design and construction
- Developer: John Livesey

Other information
- Number of rooms: 200-room hotel
- Parking: 3,500

In April 1987, the city had planned to put downtown including Plaza 8, under one roof. Developer John Livesey proposed a $100 million enclosed shopping and office complex, to be called City Center. The only buildings that would have remained in the City Center site were the relatively new Prange's and Mead Public Library buildings, along with the Trinity Lutheran Church, with a companion tower constructed next to the then-First Wisconsin Building.

According to Livesey, the project would have included:

- At least three department stores, including the existing Prange's, totaling almost 270,000 square-feet of space.
- Two 15-story office buildings with 300,000 square-feet of space.
- A 200-room hotel and convention center.
- A four-screen movie theater and food court.
- Parking for almost 3,500 cars.

In August 1988, the project received a setback when one of two remaining department stores pulled out of the proposed development. Only a four-story addition to the north side of the First Wisconsin Building was constructed as part of City Centre.

== Water feature ==
Plaza 8 featured a water feature with a cascading effect which still stands to this day as part of the main entrance plaza for Mead Public Library, whose main entrance was re-focused to face Wisconsin Avenue rather than North 8th Street in a 1997 remodeling/addition. 250 trees, 350 flowering bushes and 5,000 flowers were planted with a $5.9 million federal grant. Additional features of the plaza included; new paving, lighting and sitting areas. With completion of the plaza in 1976, traffic was restricted on North 8th Street between New York Avenue from the south and Ontario Avenue to the north. The fountain's waterfall has a drop of approximately 10 feet with a flow of 10,000 gallons per minute. Due to concerns about drowning the city eventually had to post signs prohibiting wading and playing within the water feature.

The plaza between the water feature and library, which had last been rehabilitated in 1992, was reconstructed throughout the summer of 2019 in order to better utilize the space, which had previously been all-concrete and featured obsolete electrical fixtures. A 1998 clock tower in front of the library containing four relief sculptures of library and art themes was removed, with the reliefs incorporated into four new structures along 8th Street lit by LEDs.

During the Christmas season, the city's Christmas tree (lit after the city's holiday parade) stands in front of the main waterfall, with several smaller trees in stands along the waterfall's steps; after sunset, a Christmas tree light show composed to Christmas music plays over a short range radio transmitter at 87.7 FM programmed by Mead Public Library, with a range across downtown, repeats throughout the evening. After the Christmas season, the transmitter remains in use, playing classical music and also encompassing several interactive art structures installed by the John Michael Kohler Arts Center.
