= WPNE =

WPNE may refer to:

- WPNE-TV, a television station (channel 25, virtual 38) licensed to serve Green Bay, Wisconsin, United States
- WPNE (FM), a radio station (89.3 FM) licensed to serve Green Bay, Wisconsin
