= Henry Store Foeste Building =

- U.S. National Register of Historic Places
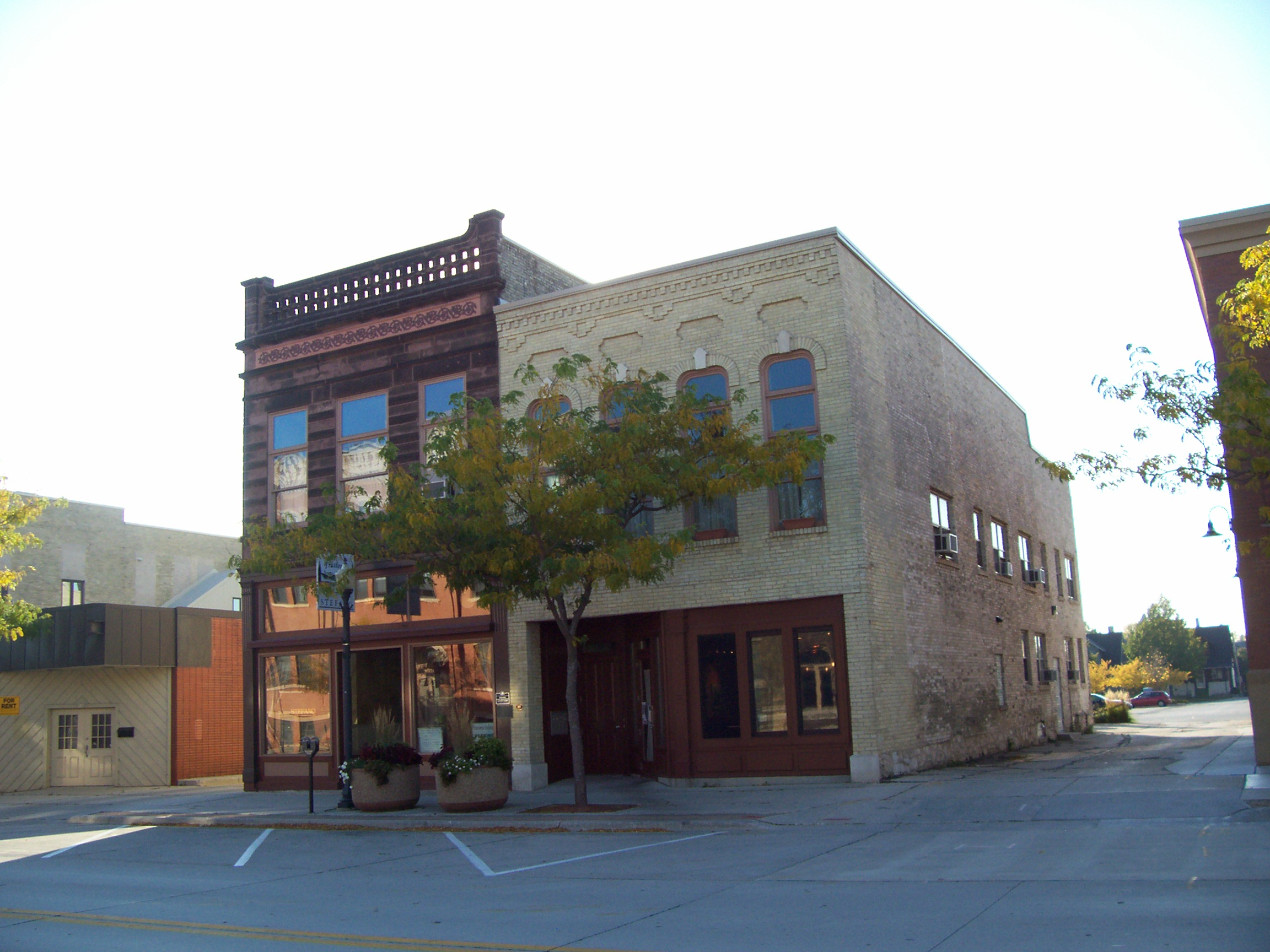

- Location within Wisconsin Location within the United States
- Location: 522 S. Eighth St., Sheboygan, Wisconsin
- Coordinates: 43°44′57″N 87°42′47″W
- Area: less than one acre
- Built: 1893
- Built by: Scnuetz & Warnecke
- Architect: Weeks, William C.
- Architectural style: Classical Revival
- NRHP reference No.: 95001063
- Added to NRHP: September 1, 1995

The Henry Store Foeste Building (also known as Sheboygan Public Library) is a two-story, classical revival style commercial building located at 522 South Eighth Street in Sheboygan, Wisconsin. It was designed by prominent Wisconsin-based architect William C. Weeks and was constructed between 1892 and 1893. It was the first building to contain the Mead Public Library. It was listed on the National Register of Historic Places on September 1, 1995, one reason being that the original exterior of the building has survived intact for over 100 years.
