= Jung Shoe Manufacturing Company Factory =

- U.S. National Register of Historic Places
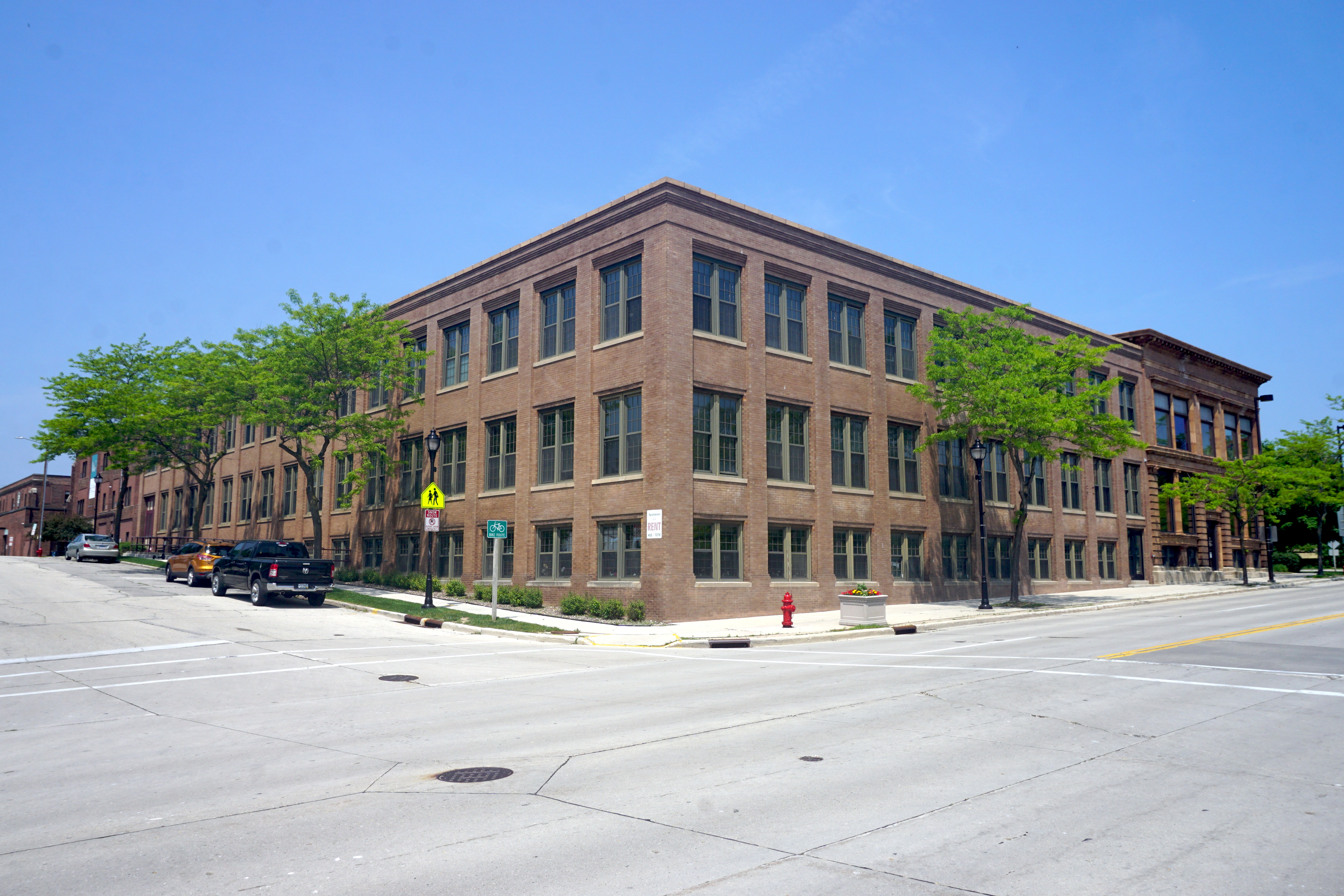

- Location within Wisconsin Location within the United States
- Location: 620 S. Eighth St., Sheboygan, Wisconsin
- Coordinates: 43°44′53″N 87°42′47″W
- Area: less than one acre
- Built: 1906
- Architect: Weeks, William C.
- Architectural style: Classical Revival
- NRHP reference No.: 91001993
- Added to NRHP: January 22, 1992

The Jung Shoe Manufacturing Company Factory at 620 S. Eighth St. in Sheboygan, Wisconsin, United States, was built in 1906. It was designed by architect William C. Weeks. It was listed on the National Register of Historic Places in 1992.

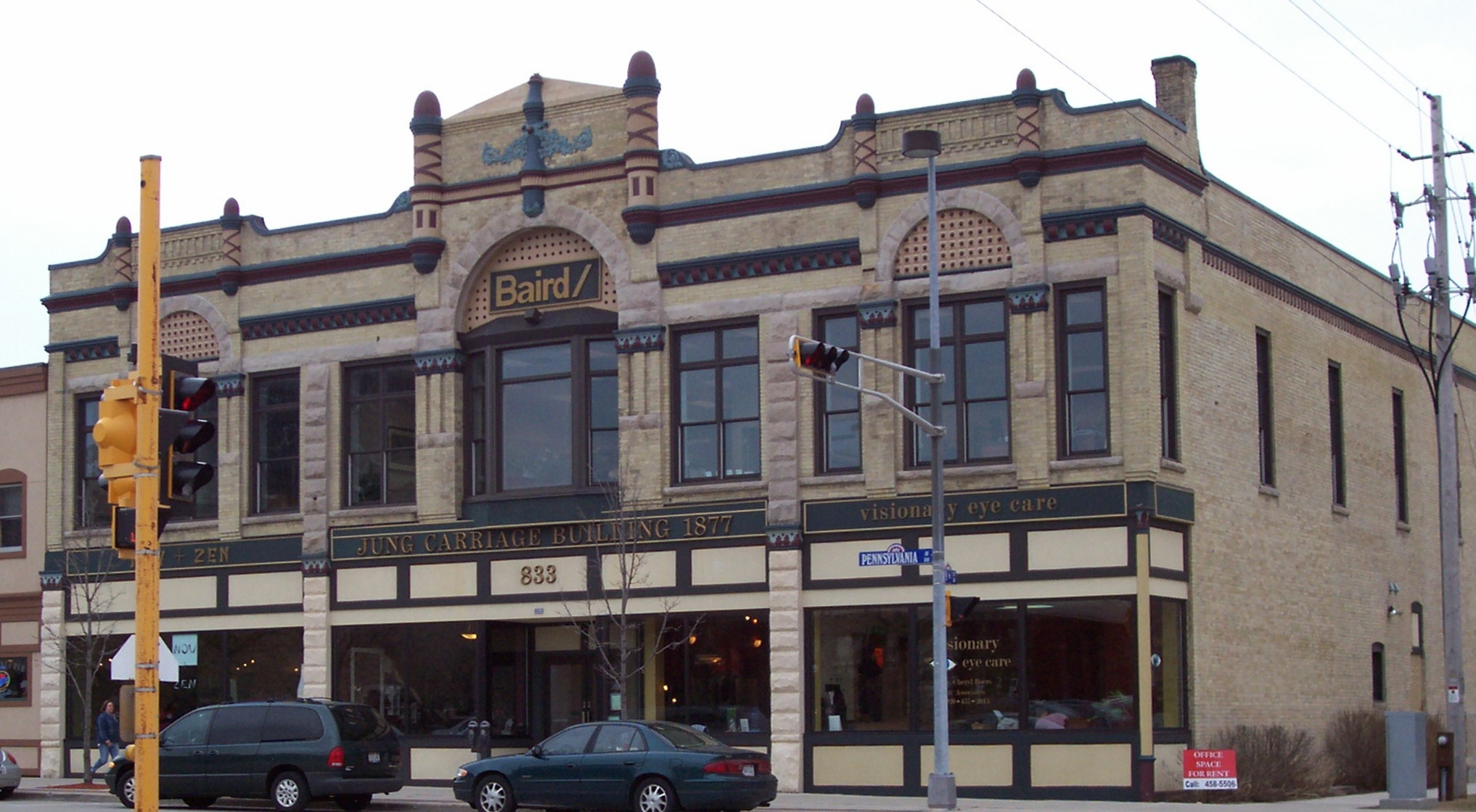

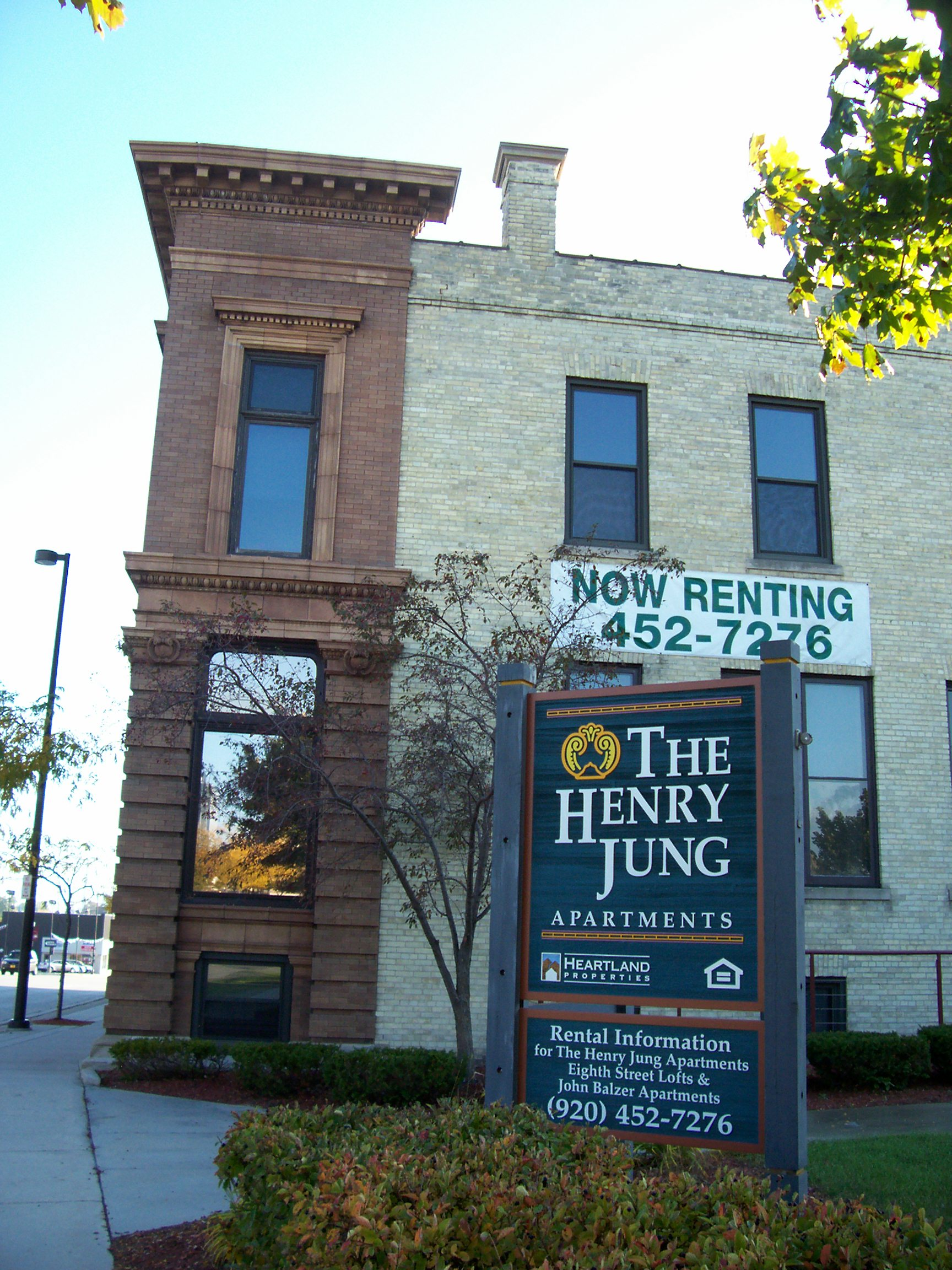
