= WHID =

Wisconsin Public Radio (Ideas Network) station in Green Bay, Wisconsin

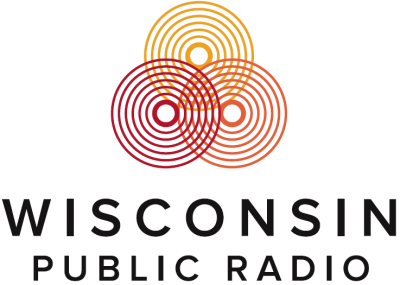
- Green Bay, Wisconsin; United States
- Frequency: 88.1 MHz
- Branding: Wisconsin Public Radio - Ideas Network

Programming
- Format: Public radio, News/talk
- Affiliations: Wisconsin Public Radio; NPR; American Public Media

Ownership
- Owner: State of Wisconsin - Educational Communications Board; (State of Wisconsin - Educational Communications Board)
- Sister stations: WPNE-TV, WPNE (FM)

History
- First air date: September 20, 1991 (as WYPD)
- Former call signs: WYPD (1991–1995)
- Call sign meaning: Disambiguation from WHA, station is a part of WPR's Ideas Network

Technical information
- Licensing authority: FCC
- Facility ID: 4215
- Class: C1
- ERP: 17,000 watts
- HAAT: 309 meters (1,014 ft)
- Repeaters: WSHS 91.7 MHz, Sheboygan (partial schedule outside school hours)

Links
- Public license information: Public file; LMS
- Webcast: Listen Live
- Website: www.wpr.org

WHID (88.1 FM) is a radio station licensed to Green Bay, Wisconsin. The station is part of Wisconsin Public Radio (WPR), and airs WPR's "Ideas Network", consisting of news and talk programming. WHID also broadcasts local news and programming from studios in the Instructional Services building at the University of Wisconsin–Green Bay, along with sister News & Classical Network station WPNE (89.3). WSHS (91.7) retransmits the WHID signal during non-school hours in the Sheboygan area.

WHID originates Hmong language programming on Saturday evenings from their Green Bay studios for the Hmong American community in northeast Wisconsin.

== See also ==
- Wisconsin Public Radio
