= Eastern Shores Library System =

Coordinates: 43.702023°N 87.759033°W

The Eastern Shores Library System (ESLS) was one of 17 public library systems in Wisconsin. Founded in 1987, it had 13 member libraries, with five in Ozaukee County and eight located in Sheboygan County, in addition to a bookmobile. Sheboygan's Mead Public Library served as the resource library for the system. The last director of ESLS was Amy Birtell.

ESLS covered 741 square miles (1,920 km^{2}), serving over 191,000 people. All thirteen libraries used the integrated library system provided by Polaris Library Systems, with the system's online catalog known as "EasiCat" (for "Eastern Shores Information Catalog"). All residents of Ozaukee and Sheboygan counties could use the services provided by Eastern Shores and its member libraries.

In 2017, Eastern Shores Library System merged with Mid-Wisconsin Library System to form Monarch Library System. The new system serves Dodge, Ozaukee, Sheboygan, and Washington Counties.

== Mission ==
"The Eastern Shores Library System is established as a federation of public libraries which has as its mission: to improve and extend public library service to all residents of the library system."

== Services ==
In 2001, ESLS initiated EasiCat, an "online shared automated catalog of all of the items owned by all of the libraries and the bookmobile." Customers were able to view items, place holds on them, and have them delivered to the library of their choice. EasiCat was able to be used in any of the libraries, as well as on any computer with Internet access.

ESLS provided a van delivery service that allowed patrons to return books and other materials to any member library. In 2005, the van delivered approximately 655,132 items among 17 libraries, 5 days a week. It also made stops at Kettle Moraine Correctional Institution and Lakeland University.

Many of the items were those requested through Interlibrary loan. Eastern Shores also had reciprocal agreements with other Wisconsin public library systems, allowing users to check out materials while on vacation.

Eastern Shores operated a Bookmobile that served many of the communities in Ozaukee and Sheboygan Counties without libraries and promoted future library use for customers. It primarily provided "popular and reading readiness materials in various formats" but also provided some reference and programming materials.

== System member libraries ==
Ozaukee County

- Cedarburg
- Saukville (Oscar Grady)
- Grafton (U.S.S. Liberty Memorial)
- Mequon-Thiensville (Frank L. Weyenberg)
- Port Washington (W.J. Niederkorn)

Sheboygan County

- Cedar Grove
- Elkhart Lake
- Kohler
- Random Lake (Lakeview Community)
- Sheboygan (Mead)
- Oostburg
- Plymouth
- Sheboygan Falls
