= Fred E. Nuernberg =

American politician

Frederick Emil Nuernberg (October 8, 1917 - June 3, 2005) was a member of the Wisconsin State Assembly.

== Biography ==
Nuernberg was born on October 8, 1917, in Sheboygan, Wisconsin. He went on to work for the Garton Toy Company and serve in the United States Navy during World War II. Nuernberg died on June 3, 2005, at the age of 87.

== Political career ==
Nuernberg was elected to the Assembly in 1950 and re-elected in 1952 and 1954. He was a Republican.

== See also ==
- The Political Graveyard
