= Garton Toy Company =

- U.S. National Register of Historic Places
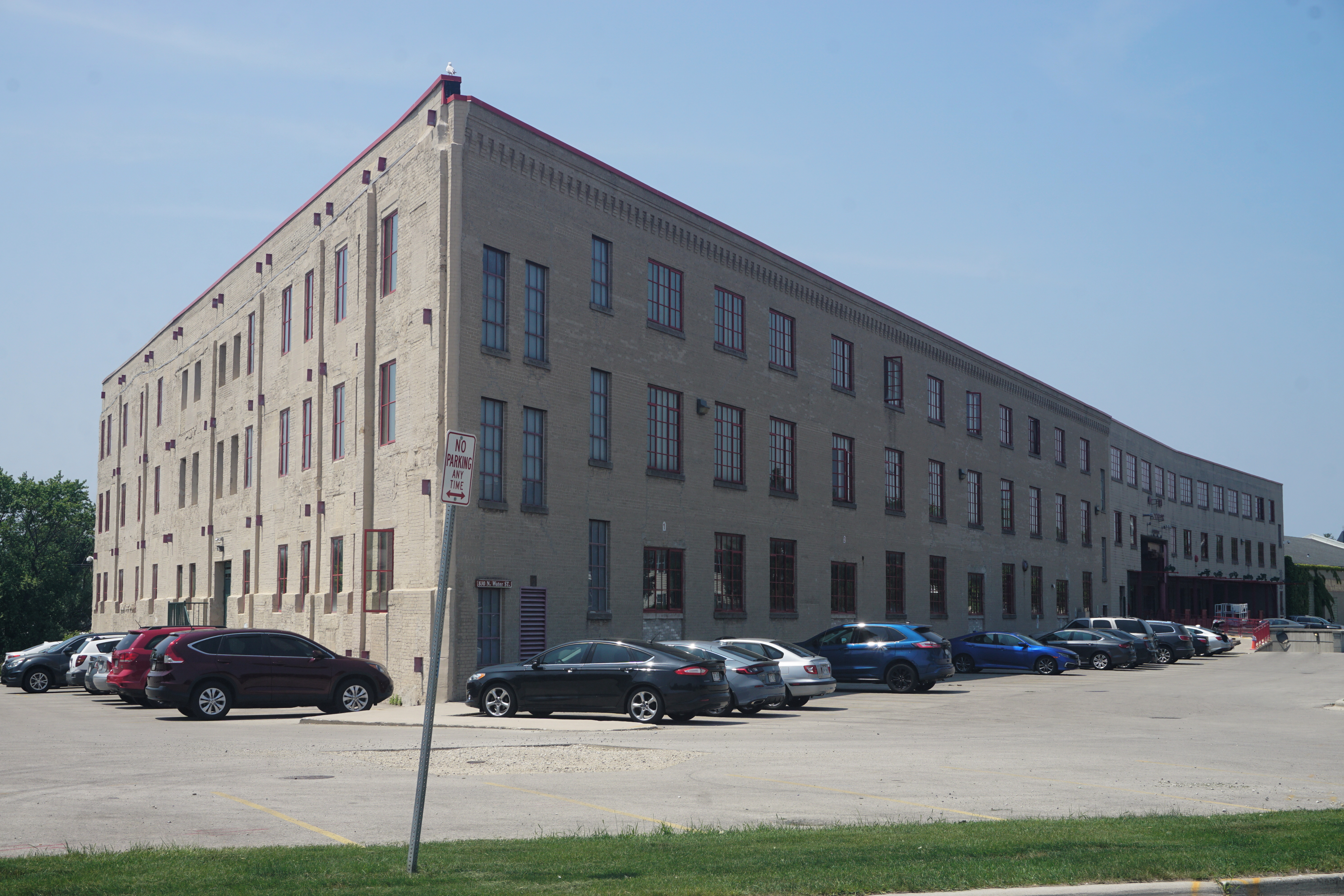

- Location within Wisconsin Location within the United States
- Location: 746, 810, 830 N. Water St., 1104 Wisconsin Ave., Sheboygan, Wisconsin
- Coordinates: 43°45′12″N 87°43′8″W
- Area: 1 acre (0.40 ha)
- Built: 1930, 1942, 1947
- Built by: De Ny, Martin
- Architect: Weeks, William C.
- Architectural style: Late 19th and Early 20th Century American Movements, Modern Movement
- NRHP reference No.: 00000493
- Added to NRHP: May 11, 2000

The Garton Toy Company was founded by Eusebius Bassingdale in Sheboygan, Wisconsin. Garton manufactures sleds, scooters, pedal cars, tricycles, and coaster wagons.

Part or all of the building the Garton Toy Company was housed in was designed by architect William C. Weeks. It was listed on the National Register of Historic Places in 2000. The building has since been converted into an apartment complex by Milwaukee-based Gorman & Company.

== Garton Family Foundation ==
Established in 1943, the foundation awards grants to local educational institutes and organizations in Sheboygan County, Wisconsin.
