= Walter Ireland =

American politician

Walter J. "Butch" Ireland, Jr. (June 15, 1923 – March 21, 2010) was an American politician and businessman.

Born in Kohler, Wisconsin, Ireland served in the United States Army Air Forces during World War II. Ireland went to Marquette University and was in the insurance business. Ireland served on the Sheboygan County, Wisconsin Board of Supervisors and a chairman of the county board. He served on the Lightfoot School Committee in Sheboygan Falls, Wisconsin. Ireland served in the Wisconsin State Assembly, from 1959 to 1961, and was a Republican. Ireland died at the Sunny Ridge Nursing Home in Sheboygan, Wisconsin.
