= Anthony Martin (escape artist) =

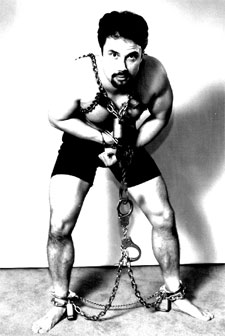
- Anthony Martin performing a Houdini escape
- Born: March 4, 1966 (age 60)
- Occupations: Escape artist, stunt performer, antique safe-cracker, locksmith
- Website: anthony-escapes.com

Todd Anthony Martin (born March 4, 1966) is an American professional escape artist, locksmith and Christian evangelist. He is most known for his daredevil skydiving and underwater escapes on network television.

== Early life ==
Martin is of German Russian descent and was born on March 4, 1966, in Sheboygan, Wisconsin. His great-grandfather fled Russia just prior to the Russian Revolution. He is the first of two children born to David and Georgene Martin.

Born to a working-class family in a Midwestern town, Martin began his career without the advantages of financial backing or theatrical connections. News clippings indicate an unusually early effort to document and substantiate his escapes, which have since become the cornerstone of his career. His first police-substantiated escape was at the age of 12, while he was still in elementary school. He currently offers a reward to anyone who can prove he resorts to the use of fake locks or handcuffs.

== Career ==
Martin rejects the use of trick or altered locks to achieve his escapes. On an ABC Network Television special, he exposed some of the tricks used by magicians to perform their escapes.

Martin is a member of several locksmithing organizations, and is a bonded locksmith. He has acted as security consultant for Folger Adam (detention equipment) and U.S. Department of Homeland Security. He has written several technical articles for a leading locksmith publication. He services and opens antique safes when not performing.

His most notable jail escapes include over a dozen documented challenges of all-steel cell blocks. He has escaped from cells that have held such infamous crime figures as Baby Face Nelson and Edward Gein of Psycho fame. The Gein jail escape required Martin to circumvent six sets of handcuffs and six prison doors to reach freedom. His subsequent appearances in Ripley's Believe It or Not! have been translated into 17 languages worldwide.

Martin's most dangerous stunts include a successful escape from a locked box thrown out of an airplane at 15,000 feet. This required him to free himself from a falling coffin, skydive away from it, and open his parachute before hitting the ground. He freed himself at 6,500 feet to accomplish the ordeal.

The frigid winters of Wisconsin helped to provide another unique test when he was locked in a steel cage lowered beneath the ice of a water-filled quarry. Chainsaws were used to cut a hole in the ice to create an entrance point for the steel cage. Locks were removed from their original factory packaging to secure the cage. One minute and forty-five seconds later, Martin emerged.

For the Discovery Channel, he leaped, shackled, over the Snake River Canyon and parachuted to safety on the north rim. Untested since Evel Knievel's stunt, the canyon presented Martin with unusual wind and turbulence concerns. He had to free his hands in freefall in order to deploy his parachute. The handcuffs used in the attempt were purchased by the Jerome County Commissioner's Office, verified by a locksmith, and secured in a vault prior to the attempt.

For the ABC Television special Secrets of the Worlds Greatest Escape Artist, he was buried alive at the Las Vegas Hilton and escaped from beneath 2000 pounds of desert sand. The restraints used in all these escapes were verified by certified bonded locksmiths.

Besides having his own network special, he has appeared on Good Morning America, A Current Affair, Dick Clark Presents, The Late Show, and many others. His television appearances have been aired in over 40 countries. His first appearance was at the age of 13.

On August 6, 2013, Martin was handcuffed, chained and locked inside a plywood box (coffin) that was released from an airplane at 14,500 feet. The event occurred over Serena in northern Illinois.

== Evangelism ==
In recent years, Martin has evangelized and promoted his Christian beliefs. Ambassador in Chains ministries was launched in 1998 as a ministry tool for local churches. Martin uses his escapes as a metaphor for escaping eternal death through repentance and faith in Jesus Christ.

Martin is the author of the book Escape or Die: An Escape Artist Unlocks the Secret to Cheating Death, which was released in 2013.
