= Above & Beyond Children's Museum =

Children's museum in Sheboygan, Wisconsin

Above and Beyond Children's Museum
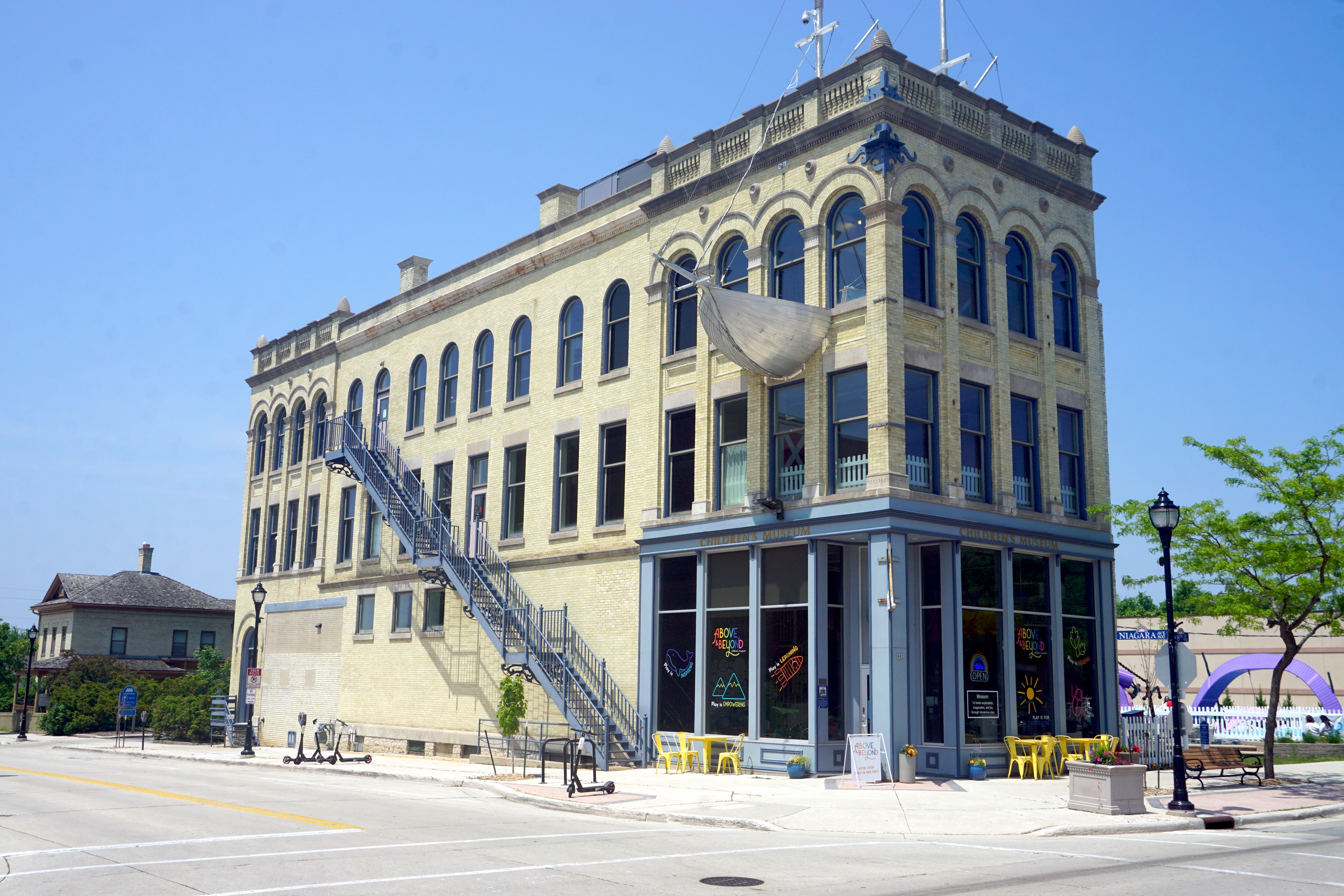
- Established: 1998
- Location: 902 North 8th Street; Sheboygan, Wisconsin 53081; United States
- Coordinates: 43°45′15″N 87°42′47″W
- Public transit access: Shoreline Metro
- Website: www.abkids.org

The Above & Beyond Children's Museum is a children's museum in downtown Sheboygan, Wisconsin. The museum has 3 floors of hands-on exhibits in over 10,000 feet of floor space.

The museum is a member of the Association of Children's Museums.

== History ==
The museum opened in 1998 and the window painting by volunteers was honored as a Make A Difference Day winner by USA Weekend.

The museum has been struggling to stay current on its mortgage. The museum was $20,000 in debt in the summer of 2007, so it attempted to sell a vacant part of its lot to the City of Sheboygan for $10,000. A bank has a lien on the property, so the transaction has not taken place as of October 2007. The museum then partnered with the Sheboygan Area School District to create a Reusable Resource Center located in the lower floor of the museum. The center holds donated furniture and other resources, which teachers and parents will be able to use for hands-on lessons.
