= Blue Harbor Resort =

Resort, water park and conference center

Coordinates: 43.745971°N 87.706368°W

Blue Harbor Resort and Spa
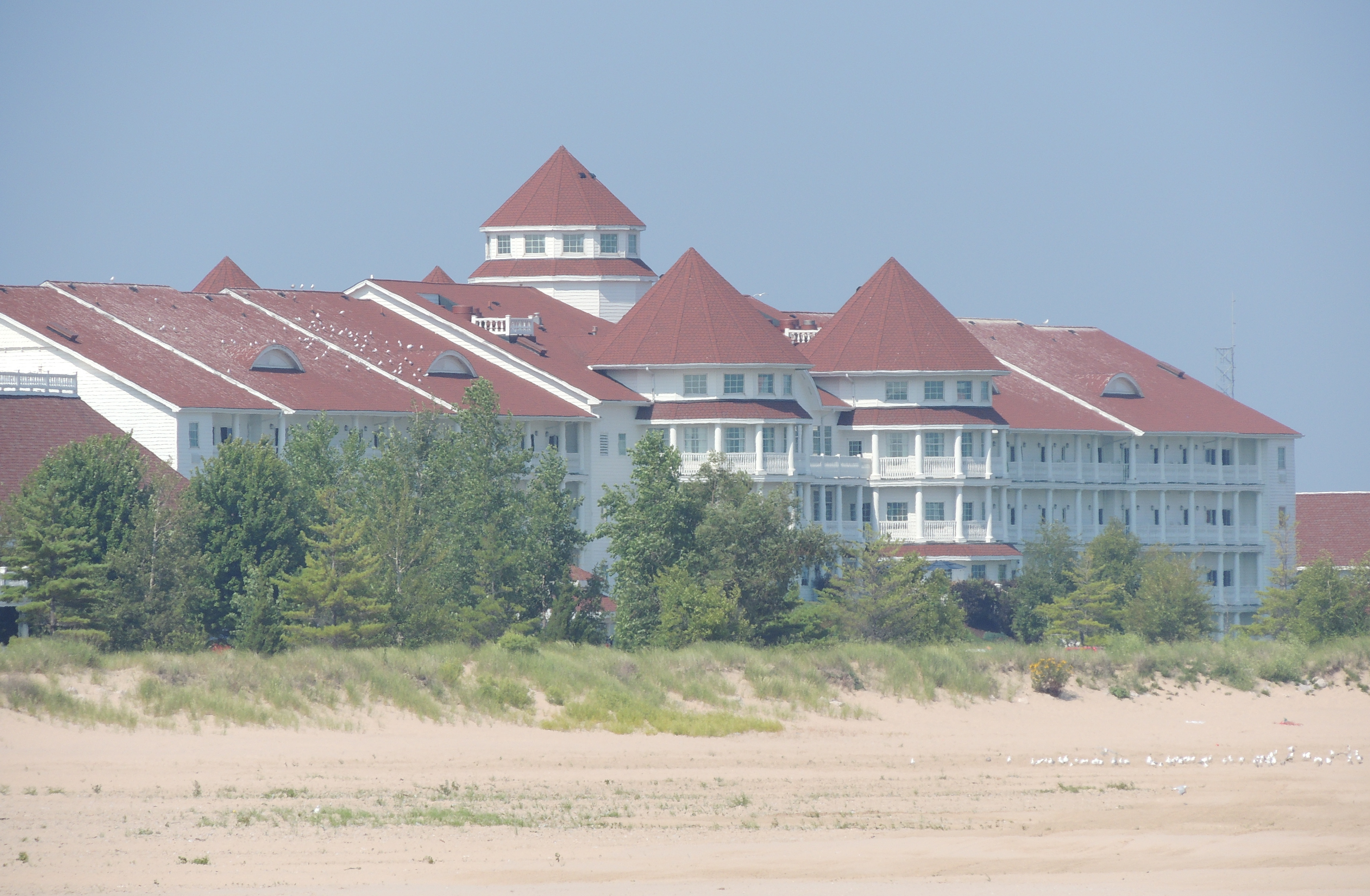
- Blue Harbor Resort as seen from Lake Michigan.
- Interactive map of the Blue Harbor Resort and Spa area

General information
- Location: 725 Blue Harbor Drive; Sheboygan, Wisconsin 53081, United States
- Construction started: June 21, 2003
- Opened: June 9, 2004
- Renovated: 2011
- Owner: Gerald Forsythe

Technical details
- Floor count: 4

Other information
- Number of rooms: 243
- Number of restaurants: 2
- Number of bars: 3
- Public transit: Shoreline Metro

Website
- www.blueharborresort.com

Blue Harbor Resort and Spa is a resort, water park and conference center in Sheboygan, Wisconsin. The resort opened in June 2004 after being built by Great Wolf Resorts.

== History ==
Blue Harbor Resort is located on Lake Michigan at the mouth of the Sheboygan River on the C. Reiss Coal Peninsula. The peninsula had formerly been used for coal storage. The property was razed and was developed into the South Pier District. The resort was built by Madison-based Great Wolf Resorts and the 182-room resort opened in 2004.

In 2011 Great Wolf Resorts announced the sale of the resort to Claremont New Frontier Resort LLC, a joint venture, for $4.2 million.

== Facilities ==
The site includes a seven slide, 38,000 square feet (3,500 m^{2}) indoor water park named Breaker Bay. Resort guests and the general public are able to purchase day passes. The 29,000 square feet (2,700 m^{2}) conference center contains fine dining and casual dining establishments. The resort also provides access to The Bull golf course and shopping along the harbor The resort has 64 villas.

Breaker Bay Waterpark

The Riptide (2015), Double Flowrider from WaveLoch/WhiteWater

Breaker Bay Pier (2004). SCS Interactive Water Play Structure

Sammy’s Slider and Snapper’s Splash (2004), two Proslide Twister body slides starting at the top of Breaker Bay Pier

Soaker and Splashdown (2004), two three-story, dueling Proslide PIPEline tube slides just over 600 feet long

Toddler Tides (2004), WhiteWater Aqua Play 200 kids play structure

Lily Hopper and Water Basketball Activity Pool (2004)

Molly's Moat (2004), Lazy River

Hot Tub (2004)

Outdoor Pool (2004)
