= Sheboygan Hmong Memorial =

Veterans memorial in Wisconsin

Coordinates: 43°45′16.35″N 87°42′15.75″W

Lao, Hmong and American Veterans Memorial
- Interactive map of Lao, Hmong and American Veterans Memorial
- Location: 901 Broughton Drive; Sheboygan, Wisconsin; United States
- Beginning date: 2004
- Opening date: May 2010

The Sheboygan Hmong Memorial (or Lao, Hmong and American Veterans Memorial) is a monument to the service and sacrifice of the Hmong people of Laos who fought for the United States during the Secret War from 1961 to 1975, part of the Laotian Civil War. The monument is located within Deland Park along the Lake Michigan shoreline of Sheboygan, Wisconsin, which contains one of the larger Hmong communities in the United States. It was dedicated on July 15, 2006. Sheboygan was among the first United States cities to accept Hmong asylum seekers and immigrants in late 1976, after the victory of a communist government in Laos.

The memorial is intended to honor and memorialize all the Hmong who fought against communism. It includes 24 panels dedicated to military personnel who were a part of the Hmong Secret Guerrilla Unit Army that fought against the North Vietnamese Army (NVA) in the Secret War, as well as all civilian participants. The monument was vandalized in 2008. In June 2010, a painted centerpiece (pang dao) was added, consisting of a green circle with traditional white needlework.

The United States did not acknowledge the Secret War until 1997, under the administration of President Bill Clinton, as a result of Hmong and Congressional pressure. In 2004, following several years of pressure from a coalition of U.S. conservatives and liberal human rights activists, the U.S. government reversed a policy of denying immigration to Hmong who had fled Laos in the 1990s for refugee camps in Thailand. In a major victory for the refugees, the US government recognized some 15,000 Hmong as asylum seekers and afforded them expedited U.S. immigration rights.

== See also ==
- Hmong in Wisconsin
