= William C. Weeks =

American architect

W.C. Weeks
- Born: William C. Weeks; February 16, 1856; Sheboygan, Wisconsin
- Died: March 14, 1938 (aged 82); St. Petersburg, Florida
- Occupation: Architect

William C. Weeks (February 16, 1856 – March 14, 1938) was an American architect and builder in Wisconsin. He designed several works that are listed on the U.S. National Register of Historic Places.

== Early life ==
Weeks was born on February 16, 1856, the son of prominent architect Alvin L. Weeks and the former Elizabeth C. Weeks. He married Hannah Obrink of Oostburg, Wisconsin on December 20, 1905.

== Works ==
| Building | Location | Notes | Image |
|---|---|---|---|
| Jung Shoe Manufacturing Company Factory | 620 South 8th Street | Converted into apartments in the 1990s | |
| Henry Store Foeste Building | 522 South 8th Street | Converted to a restaurant | |
| Garton Toy Company | 830 North Water Street | Converted to apartments | |
| Eliza Prange House | 605 Erie Avenue | Personal residence | |
