= Mead Public Library =

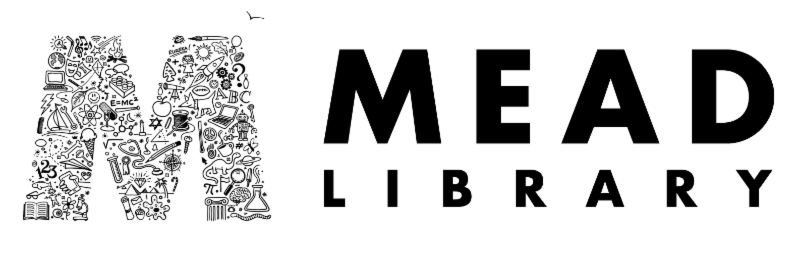

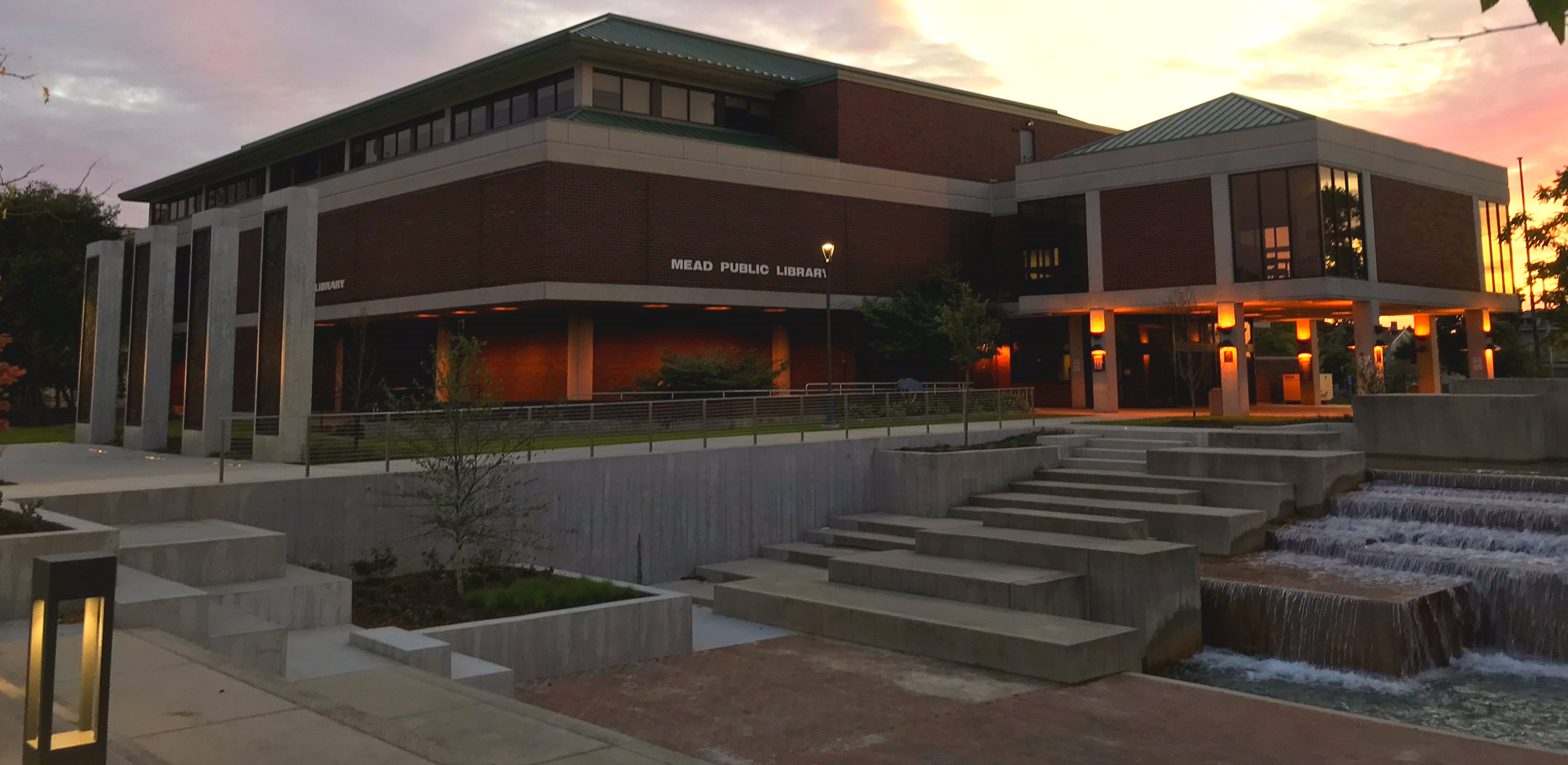
- The Mead Public Library building in October 2019.
- 43.75234°N 87.71358°W
- Location: 710 North 8th Street; Sheboygan, Wisconsin
- Type: Public library
- Established: 1897

Collection
- Size: 253,209 (2021)

Access and use
- Members: 39,871 (2021)

Other information
- Budget: $2,557,264 (2022)
- Director: Garrett Erickson
- Employees: 38.75 FTE (2021)
- Public transit access: Shoreline Metro
- Website: www.meadpl.org

Mead Public Library is a municipal library in Sheboygan, Wisconsin and serves Sheboygan County. It is the main headquarters library of the Monarch Library System, consisting of libraries in Sheboygan, Ozaukee, Dodge, and Washington Counties.

== History ==
James H. Mead, from Montpelier, Vermont, came to Sheboygan in 1856. With his father-in-law, he founded and obtained a charter for the German Bank (later known as Security First National bank, then acquired by First Wisconsin Bank in 1985, eventually becoming a part of US Bank after Firstar's purchase of that bank in 2001). At the time of his death in 1891, he was president of the German Bank and the Crocker Chair Company. He left $10,000 to the First Congregational Church and $20,000 to the City of Sheboygan to be used to provide places "for the amusement and literary culture of young men," in the case of the gift to the city, for a public library.

After being contained within several storefronts (including the Foeste Building), with the assistance of funds from Andrew Carnegie's Carnegie library effort, the library was moved into its own dedicated building in 1904, located at the corner of N. 7th Street and New York Avenue.

== Library branches ==
During the early 1950s, the library built two branch libraries. Although Sheboygan had had many different branches over the years, these were the first constructed to serve as library branches. The first was the Frank Stone branch attached to Cooper Elementary School on the city's north side. Frank Stone was the first librarian of the Sheboygan Library Association. The second branch was named after Charles E. Broughton and was attached to Wilson Elementary School on the city's south side.

=== Current location ===
Early in 1964, the library board agreed that a new or expanded library building was needed and money for planning was requested of, and granted by, the Common Council in the next annual budget. A bond issue, containing $2.3 million for the construction of a new library, was approved by the Common Council in 1970. The city at this time was acquiring land for Plaza 8. The city planner at that time reported that some of this land, located at North 8th Street and New York Avenue, could be used as a library site.

The new and current 64,000 square-foot library opened in 1974. Before the opening, hundreds of high school students lugged 150,000 books from the old library to the new, one block to the west. Units of the Wisconsin National Guard and the Army Reserve moved heavy equipment with their trucks. The original design of the library was of a Brutalist structure, with a large amount of vaulted concrete and brickwork defining the interior structure of the library. The main library took up the second floor, with the children's room on the first floor, and services including circulation, administration, and the headquarters for the Eastern Shores Library System in an exposed basement which was landscaped on a slope which came down from Plaza 8's water feature.

The Carnegie building was then used for the city's health department and county human services until the 90s, when the John Michael Kohler Arts Center acquired the building and disassembled the interior, retaining the facade as a modern 'ruin', with the former building footprint containing gardens.

In April 1987, the city had planned to put downtown including Plaza 8, under one roof. Developer John Livesey proposed a $100 million enclosed shopping and office complex, to be called City Center. The only buildings that would have remained in the City Center site were the Prange's store, Mead Public Library and Trinity Lutheran Church. Most of the other buildings would have been demolished by the city including the First Wisconsin Sheboygan Bank (now the U.S. Bank). In 1992, the process of removing Plaza 8 from the block between the Mead Public Library and Prange's across the street was completed, though due to the water feature and the Prange's frontage, the restored North 8th Street was a compressed two-lane road through the library block.

From 1996 until 1998, the current library building underwent an expansion which changed the building's front from North 8th Street to Wisconsin Avenue. The Brutalist features of the building were considerably lightened with dropped ceilings and brighter lighting, with the children's room moved to a newly built third floor with panoramic views of the surroundings of Sheboygan. A quiet study room was placed atop the new second floor frontage, and fiction and audiovisual services were moved down to the first floor. The library's check-out system also changed considerably, from an early light pen and RFID system to a current all-RFID system which now uses several self-checkout kiosks, freeing up library staff to provide other services. Computer services, which in the 1980s were limited to Infotrac terminals, have also widened considerably to a number of internet terminals throughout the building and the move of the card catalog system to a fully web-based system shared with its sister libraries in the Monarch system. In 2024 the library installed an outdoor pick-up system to allow patrons to pick up reserved materials after hours.

== See also ==
- Plaza 8
- Eastern Shores Library System
