= John M. Detling =

American politician

John M. Detling (1880–1948) was a member of the Wisconsin State Assembly.

== Biography ==
Detling was born on June 21, 1880, in Sheboygan, Wisconsin. His father, Valentine Detling, was also a member of the Assembly. In 1905, Detling graduated from the University of Wisconsin Law School. He died on January 8, 1948.

== Career ==
Detling was elected to the Assembly in 1906. He was a Democrat.
