= Henry A. Hillemann =

American lawyer and politician

Henry August Hillemann (November 25, 1928 – September 25, 1967) was an American lawyer and politician.

Born in Sheboygan, Wisconsin, Hillemann graduated from Sheboygan Central High School. He then received his bachelor's degree from University of Wisconsin–Madison and his law degree from University of Wisconsin Law School. Hillemann then worked for the Wisconsin Public Service Commission. He then practiced law in Sheboygan, Wisconsin. He taught law at Lakeland College. From 1957 to 1961, he served on the Sheboygan Common Council and was active in the Democratic Party. From 1959 until September 1, 1961, Hillemann served in the Wisconsin State Assembly. He resigned from the Wisconsin Assembly to become executive secretary of the Wisconsin Judicial Council in Madison, Wisconsin. He died in Madison, Wisconsin as a result from complications due to heart surgery.
