= William Weekes (priest) =

South African dean (1867–1945)

William Haye Weekes (5 March 1867 in Cambridge – 2 August 1945 in Kenilworth) was Dean of Bloemfontein in South Africa from 1922 to 1940.

He was educated at Bristol Grammar School and Sidney Sussex College, Cambridge; and ordained in 1891. After a curacy at St Sidwell, Ex3eter he was Chaplain to the Bishop of Bloemfontein. In 1896 he became Rector of Makefing. He was Rector at Beaconsfield from 1901 until 1912; and then of Kroonstad until 1917. He was Archdeacon of Kimberley from 1905 to 1917; and of Bloemfontein (and Vicar of the Cathedral Parish) from 1917 to 1940. He was appointed a Chaplain of the Order of St John of Jerusalem in 1931.
