= Frederick W. Krez =

American politician and businessman

Frederick W. Krez (October 22, 1899 – January 25, 1969) was an American politician and businessman.

Born in Sheboygan, Wisconsin, Krez served in the United States Marine Corps during World War I. He went to Ripon College and then received his bachelor's degree from University of Wisconsin and his law degree from University of Wisconsin Law School. Krez practiced law in Plymouth, Wisconsin where he had lived. In 1931, Krez served in the Wisconsin State Assembly and was a Republican. Krez died of a heart attack in Chicago, Illinois. He was working in the Federal Estate and Gift Tax Division in Chicago at the time of his death, but still lived in Plymouth, Wisconsin. His father was Paul T. Krez who was the Sheboygan County judge and his grandfather was Conrad Krez who also served in the Wisconsin State Assembly.
