= Shoreline Metro =

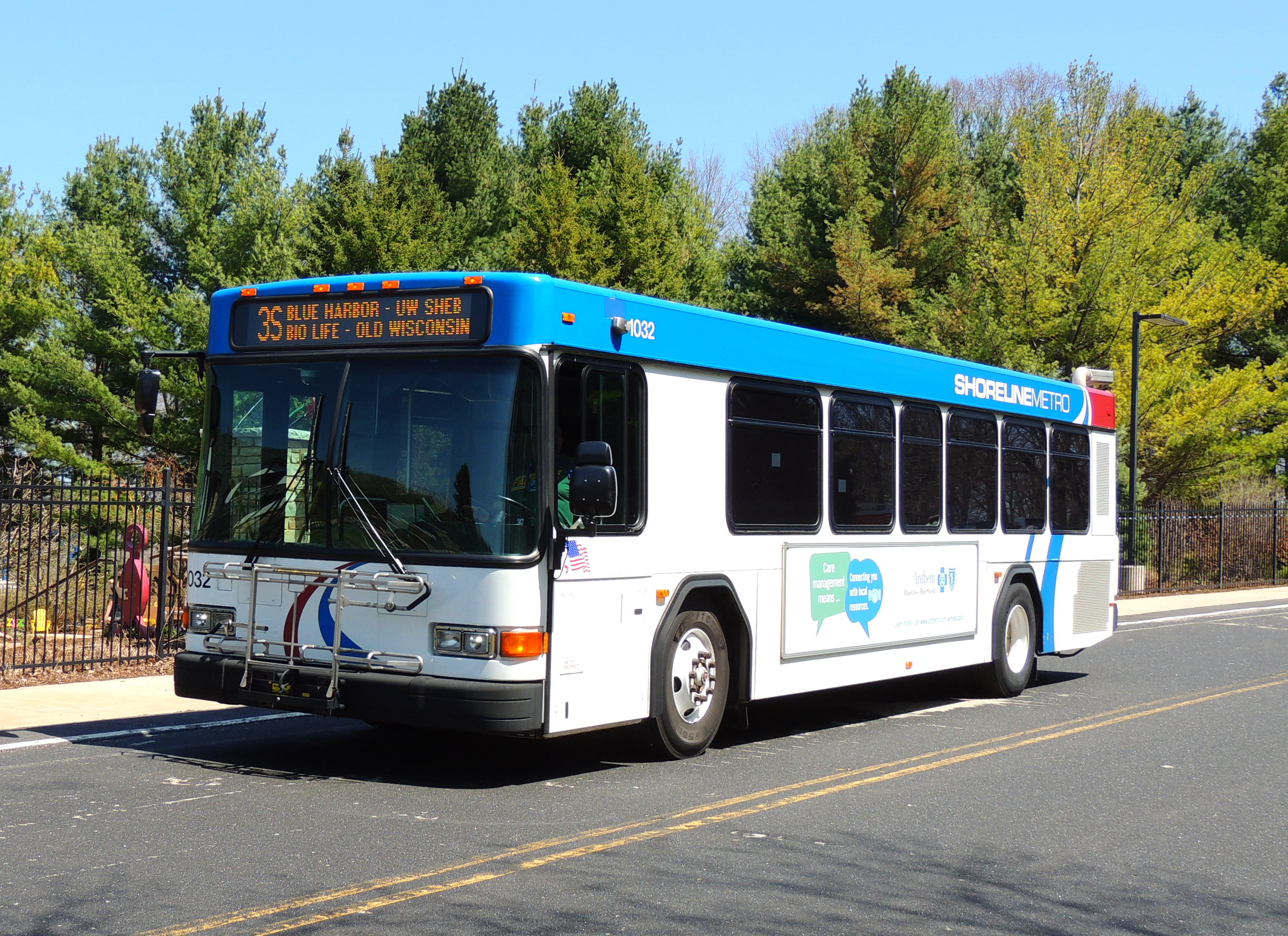
- Founded: 1972
- Headquarters: 608 South Commerce Street; Sheboygan, Wisconsin, United States
- Service type: bus service
- Routes: 10
- Fleet: 27
- Daily ridership: 1,700+ (2014)
- Operator: City of Sheboygan
- Website: www.shorelinemetro.com

Shoreline Metro (formerly Sheboygan Transit) is the bus system owned and operated by the city of Sheboygan, Wisconsin. Shoreline Metro services three communities with fixed route public transit system including the City of Sheboygan, Sheboygan Falls and Kohler. It operates ten fixed routes Monday through Saturday and tripper service during the school year with an additional three morning routes and four afternoon routes for school-aged children.

The system is publicly operated by the City of Sheboygan under the authority of the Sheboygan Transit Commission and managed by the Director of Transit & Parking.

== History ==
Shoreline Metro has been in service since 1972, but traces its formation back to the Sheboygan City Railway Company in 1886. Various private companies have succeeded each other in the area, transitioning from light rail to streetcars to buses. The system changed their name in October 2010 from Sheboygan Transit to "Lakeshore Metro", but changed it further to "Shoreline Metro" February 2011 due to a trademark conflict with an already existing private paratransit company, Lakeshore Transportation.

== Bus fleet ==
Shoreline Metro operates with 15 Gillig Low Floor Buses, seven Chance buses and four Rapid Transit Series buses.

== Sheboygan Transit Center ==
Shoreline Metro has a heated transfer center built in 1991 located in the central business district at 828 Pennsylvania Avenue, providing safe shelter for Shoreline Metro passengers. In addition to being a transfer point for all Shoreline Metro fixed routes (with northbound routes using the west lane and southbound routes using the east lane), the transfer center is also serviced by several intercity bus services, including Indian Trails, Jefferson Lines and Lamers Connect (on weekends). The transfer point also has a physical office to provide customer assistance and sell daily and monthly paper bus passes open during regular business hours. Formerly the heated shelter space contained a vending machine for passes and tokens, but it was withdrawn from service in 2021 upon the system adding the option for mobile app-based fare payments using the Canadian-based parking and bus payment provider, HotSpot, who is also the vendor for app-based payments for municipal parking in Sheboygan. The heated shelter is closed during the summer.

== Route list ==
All routes depart from the Transfer Point, located in Downtown Sheboygan.

Route #	Destination(s)
Route 3 North	Lakeshore Technical College Sheboygan campus, RCS Empowers, Michigan Avenue and Calumet Drive businesses, along with Cooper and Pigeon River Elementary Schools.
Route 3 South	South Pier, Blue Harbor Resort, Georgia Ave Apartments, Bio Life, University of Wisconsin–Green Bay, Sheboygan Campus, Bookworm Gardens, along with James Madison Elementary and peak-hour service to Horace Mann Middle School.
Route 5 North	North 8th Street, Urban Middle School, Sheboygan North High School, Northgate Commons and Eisner Court.
Route 5 South	Heritage Square, Farnsworth Middle School, Early Learning Center, Wilson Elementary School and Indian Meadows Trailer Court.
Route 7 North	HSHS St. Nicholas Hospital, Aurora Sheboygan Clinic, Pick 'n Save and Sheboygan Police Department.
Route 7 South	Boys and Girls Club of Sheboygan, South 12th Street, and Country Village Apartments. Sheboygan South High School, Farnsworth Middle School, Longfellow Elementary School and Sheboygan County Christian High School.
Route 10 North	Aurora Health Center, Memorial Plaza, Marcus Cinema, Sheboygan County Job Center, Meijer/Kohl's, Festival Foods, Taylor Heights and Tamarack Apartments.
Route 10 South	Municipal Service Building & Public Works, Aldi, Kohler Credit Union, Sheboygan County Meals on Wheels, Acuity Insurance, Walmart South, Goodwill and Washington Square.
Route 20	Kohler: Deer Trace Shopping Center, Kohler Company, The Shops at Woodlake, and Kohler High School; Sheboygan Falls:Elementary/Middle & High Schools, Municipal Building, Piggly Wiggly and Aging & Disability Resource Center.
Route 40	The Square (formerly Harbor Centre Express) provides summer-only service to Blue Harbor Resort, Above & Beyond Children's Museum, Stefanie H. Weill Center, Mead Public Library, Harbor Centre Marina, YMCA.

- Blue indicates route serving north side.
- Red indicates route serving south side.

== Ridership ==
	Ridership	Change over previous year
2013	562,752	n/a
2014	576,189	▲2.39%
2015	573,257	▼0.51%
2016	562,092	▼1.95%
2017	565,315	▲0.57%
2018	634,372	▲12.22%
2019	712,577	▲12.33%
2020	391,585	▼45.05%
2021	441,870	▲12.84%
2022	512,504	▲15.99%
2023	585,328	▲14.21%

Between 2010 and 2018, Shoreline Metro’s ridership grew 20.2 percent and passengers per hour increased 23.1 percent.
