= Valentine Detling =

American businessman and politician

Valentine Detling (March 28, 1843 – December 26, 1920) was an American businessman and politician.

Born in Dutchess County, New York, Detling moved with his parents in 1848 to Wisconsin Territory and settled on a farm in the town of Polk, Washington County, Wisconsin. From 1864 to 1878, Detling lived in Berlin, Wisconsin. During this time, he served as register of deeds for Washington County in 1855 and 1856 and 1867 to 1871. From 1873 to 1880, Detling lived in Plymouth, Sheboygan County, Wisconsin, moved to Sheboygan, Wisconsin, and then served as register of deeds, for Sheboygan County, from 1880 to 1887. In 1889, Detling served in the Wisconsin State Assembly and was a Democrat. Detling was president of the Sheboygan Loan and Trust Company and was in the real estate business. Detling died of a heart attack at his home in Sheboygan, Wisconsin. His son, John M. Detling, was also a member of the Assembly.
