= Conrad Krez =

American politician

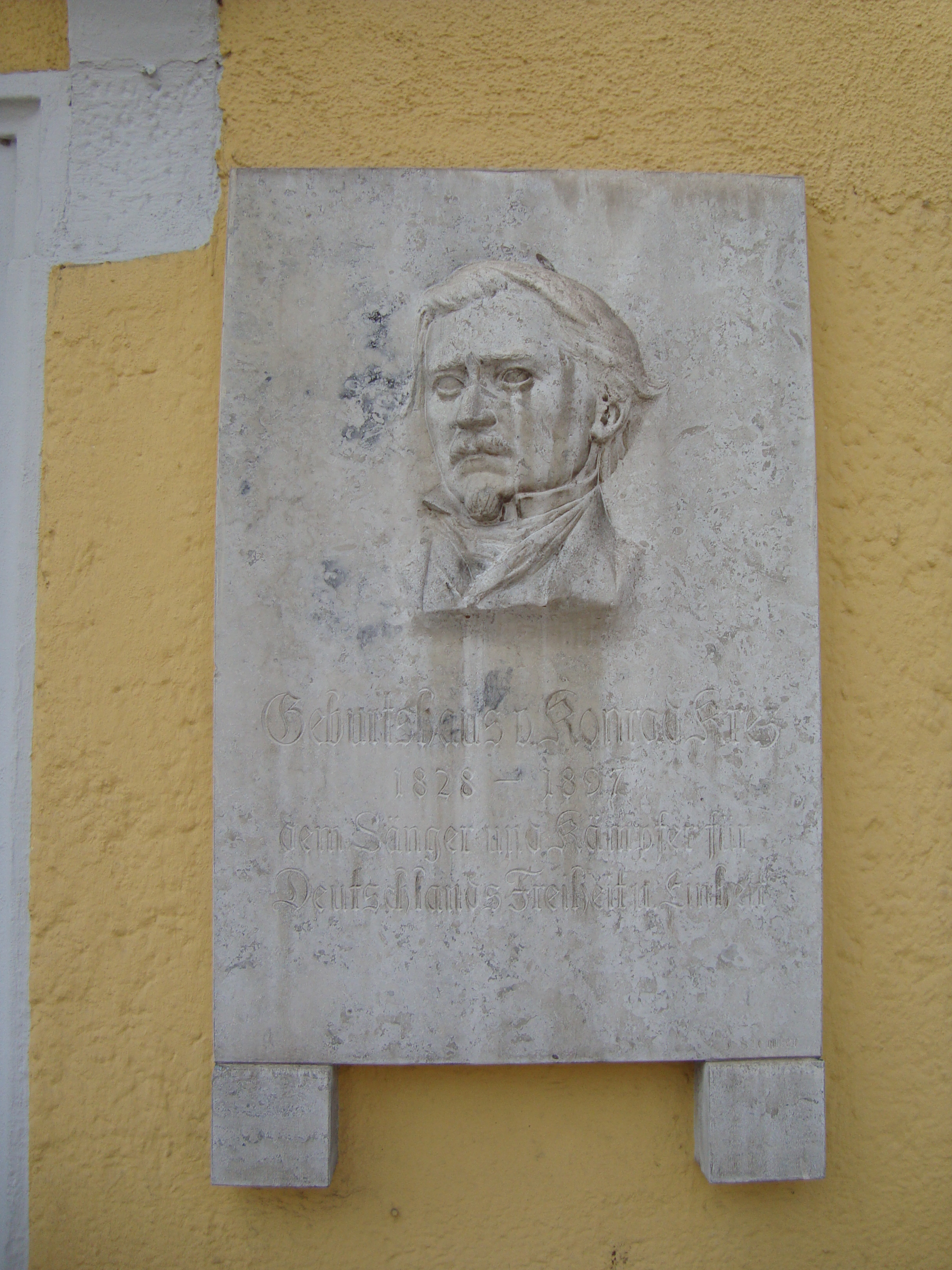
Commemorative plaque for Krez at his birthplace in Landau in der Pfalz

Conrad Krez (April 27, 1828 – March 9, 1897) was a German-American politician, military officer and poet.

== Biography ==
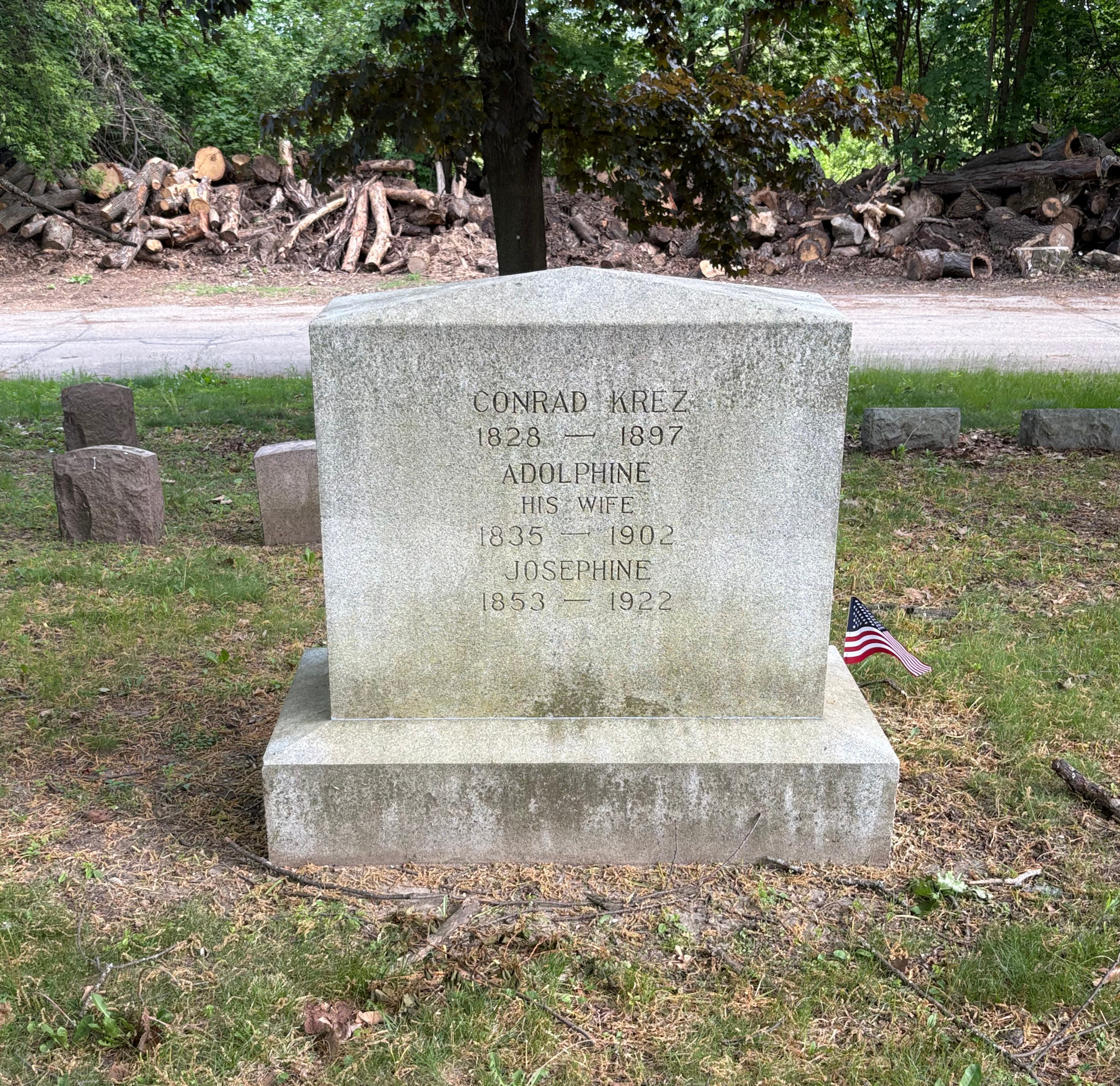
Krez's grave at Forest Home Cemetery

Krez was born on April 27, 1828, in Landau, Palatinate, Kingdom of Bavaria. He attended the Ludwig-Maximilians-Universität München and Heidelberg University. After the failed Revolutions of 1848 in the German states, Krez fled to France. In 1851, he moved to the United States and settled in New York City. The following year, he married Adolphine Stemmler. They had seven children. His son was Judge Paul T. Krez who was Sheboygan County judge and his grandson was Frederick W. Krez who also served in the Wisconsin State Assembly. In 1854, he and his family moved to Sheboygan, Wisconsin. Krez died on March 9, 1897, in Milwaukee, Wisconsin. He is buried at Forest Home Cemetery.

== Political career ==
Krez was City Attorney of Sheboygan from 1856 to 1859 and District Attorney of Sheboygan County, Wisconsin, from 1859 to 1862 and again from 1870 to 1876. Originally a Republican, Krez became a Democrat in 1872. In 1885, he was appointed U.S. Collector of Customs of Milwaukee by President Grover Cleveland. He remained in that position until 1889. Krez was then a member of the Wisconsin State Assembly from 1891 to 1892 and City Attorney of Milwaukee from 1892 to 1894.

== Military career ==
Krez joined the Union Army in 1862 during the American Civil War. He helped to form the 27th Wisconsin Volunteer Infantry Regiment was placed in charge of said regiment. Krez was mustered out of the volunteers on August 29, 1865. On January 13, 1866, President Andrew Johnson nominated Krez for appointment to the grade of brevet brigadier general of volunteers to rank from March 26, 1865, and the United States Senate confirmed the appointment on March 12, 1866.
