= WPNE (FM) =

Wisconsin Public Radio station in Green Bay, Wisconsin

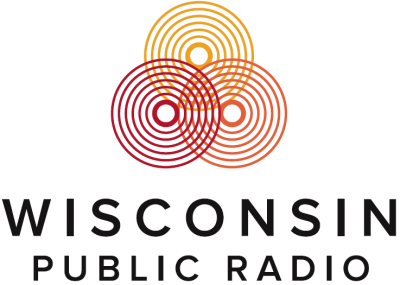
- Green Bay, Wisconsin; United States
- Broadcast area: Green Bay, Wisconsin
- Frequency: 89.3 MHz (HD Radio)
- Branding: Wisconsin Public Radio - News & Music Network

Programming
- Format: Public radio; classical music; news
- Subchannels: HD2: All Classical Network
- Network: Wisconsin Public Radio
- Affiliations: NPR; American Public Media

Ownership
- Owner: Wisconsin Educational Communications Board; (State of Wisconsin - Educational Communications Board)
- Sister stations: WPNE-TV; WHID

History
- First air date: 1949
- Former call signs: WHKW (1949–1973)
- Call sign meaning: Public Broadcasting for Northeastern Wisconsin

Technical information
- Licensing authority: FCC
- Facility ID: 63060
- Class: C1
- ERP: 100,000 watts
- HAAT: 286 meters (938 ft)
- Transmitter coordinates: 44.4097°N 88.0018°W

Links
- Public license information: Public file; LMS
- Webcast: Listen live
- Website: www.wpr.org

WPNE (89.3 MHz) is an FM radio station licensed to Green Bay, Wisconsin. The station is part of Wisconsin Public Radio (WPR), and airs WPR's "NPR News and Classical Network", consisting of classical music and news and talk programming. WPNE-FM also broadcasts regional news and programming from studios in the Instructional Services building at the University of Wisconsin–Green Bay, along with sister Ideas Network station WHID (88.1). WPNE-FM transmits from facilities shared with WBAY-TV, WIXX, and WPNE-TV in Ledgeview.

The station signed on in 1949 as WHKW, originally licensed in Chilton. It was the third FM station in the Wisconsin Educational Radio Network, forerunner of Wisconsin Public Radio. In 1973, WHKW moved to the WPNE-TV transmitter site in Green Bay after that station's launch the year before, and became WPNE-FM; it also supplanted an additional Wisconsin Educational Radio Network transmitter, WHMD-FM 91.5 at Suring, which had signed on in 1965.

Unusual for a market of its size, as of the end of 2022, WPNE is the only radio station in Green Bay, the Fox Cities, and the Lake Winnebago cities which transmits an HD Radio broadcast; WPNE-HD2 transmits WPR's HD Classical Network full-time.
