= Sheboygan, Wisconsin =

- City
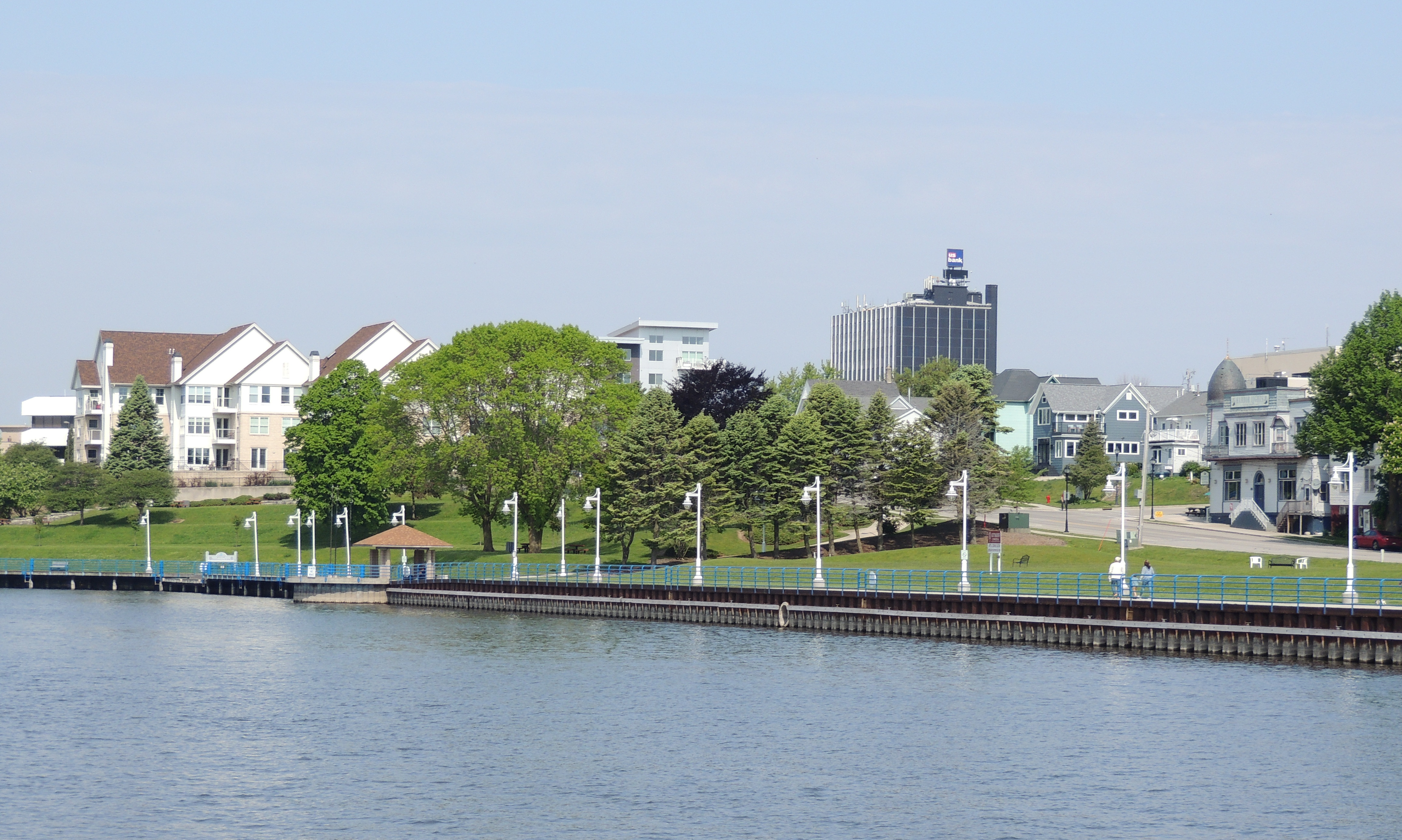
- Sheboygan Riverfront

- Seal
- Nicknames: "Malibu of the Midwest", "Bratwurst Capital of the World", "The City of Cheese, Chairs, Children & Churches"
- Interactive map of Sheboygan, Wisconsin
- Location within Wisconsin Location within the United States
- Coordinates: 43°45′0″N 87°43′30″W
- Country: United States
- State: Wisconsin
- Counties: Sheboygan
- Settled: 1780s
- Incorporated (city): March 19, 1853; 173 years ago

Government
  - Type: Mayor–council
  - Body: Common Council
  - Mayor: Ryan Sorenson
  - City Administrator: Casey Bradley
  - City Clerk: Meredith DeBruin

Area
  - City: 15.83 sq mi (41.00 km^{2})
  - Land: 15.64 sq mi (40.51 km^{2})
  - Water: 0.19 sq mi (0.49 km^{2})

Population (2020)
  - City: 49,929
  - Density: 3,066.9/sq mi (1,184.14/km^{2})
  - Metro: 118,034
- Time zone: UTC−6 (Central)
  - Summer (DST): UTC−5 (Central)
- ZIP Codes: 53081–53083
- Area codes: 920
- FIPS code: 55-72975
- Website: www.sheboyganwi.gov

Sheboygan (/ʃɪˈbɔɪɡən/) is a city in Sheboygan County, Wisconsin, United States, and its county seat. The population was 49,929 at the 2020 census, while the Sheboygan metropolitan area had 118,034 residents. The city is located on the western shore of Lake Michigan at the mouth of the Sheboygan River, about 50 miles (80 kilometers) north of Milwaukee and 64 miles (103 kilometers) south of Green Bay.

== History ==
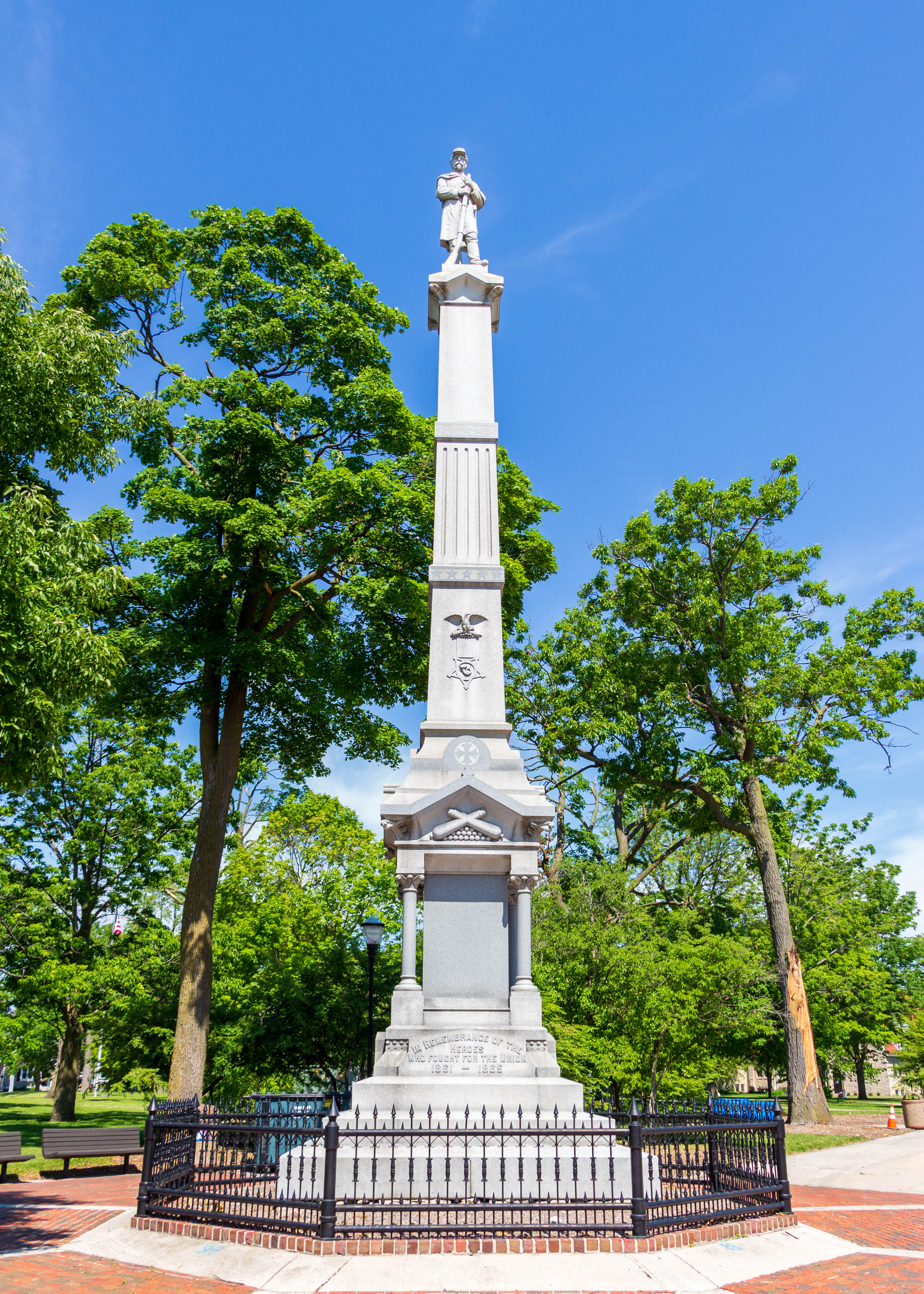
The Sheboygan Civil War Monument, located in Fountain Park

Before its settlement by European Americans, the Sheboygan area was home to Native Americans, including members of the Potawatomi, Chippewa, Ottawa, Winnebago, and Menominee tribes. In the Menominee language, the place is known as Sāpīwǣhekaneh, "at a hearing distance in the woods". The Menominee ceded this land to the United States in the 1831 Treaty of Washington. Following the treaty, the land became available for sale to American settlers. Migrants from New York, Michigan, and New England were among the first new Americans to settle this area in the 1830s, though the French had been present in the region since the 17th century and had intermarried with local people. One 19th century settler remarked: "Nearly all the settlers were from the New England states and New York." Lumbering was the first major industry, as trees were harvested and shipped to eastern markets through the Great Lakes.

Although Sheboygan was officially incorporated in 1846, much of the town had been platted in 1836, when property investors laid out more than one thousand lots. One theory for why the town was called Sheboygan is that it was a Chippewa word meaning a waterway between lakes.

By 1849, a wave of liberal, middle-class immigration triggered by the revolutions of 1848 had made the community known for its German population. As Major William Williams wrote on June 26, 1849: "Arrived at Sheboigin [sic] on the Wisconsin side, a small town, population purhaps [sic] from 700 to 1000. This is a promising place. There are a great many best class of Germans settling around it. 'Tis all along this Lake so far quite an interesting country." Between 1840 and 1890, Protestant Dutch immigrants also settled in the area, as did Irish refugees fleeing the Great Famine. A neighborhood in northwestern Sheboygan (between Martin Avenue and Alexander Court) was settled by Slovenian immigrants and acquired the name Laibach; it was also known as Vollrath's Division. According to a local Optimist member's account in 1963, in 1887 Sheboygan adopted a sundown town ordinance, banning African Americans from living there, though city leaders denied that any such ordinance was in effect.

In the spring of 1898, Sheboygan elected Fred C. Haack and August L. Mohr as aldermen, making them the first two Social Democratic Party candidates to be elected to public office in the United States. Haack had originally been elected in 1897 as a member of the Populist Party but joined the Social Democrats after they organized locally. Haack served as alderman for sixteen years before moving to Milwaukee and being elected as a Socialist alderman there. At the 1932 Socialist Party convention, Haack received recognition as the first Socialist officeholder in America.

In the early 20th century, many Orthodox Greeks, Catholic Slavs, and Lithuanians immigrated to Sheboygan. In the late 20th century, Hmong refugees from Laos and Southeast Asia settled there.

== Geography ==
According to the United States Census Bureau, the city has a total area of 15.83 square miles (41.00 km^{2}), of which 15.64 square miles (40.51 km^{2}) is land and 0.19 square miles (0.49 km^{2}) is water. It is located at latitude 43°45' north, longitude 87°44' west.

=== Climate ===
Sheboygan has a warm-summer humid continental climate typical of Wisconsin. In spite of its position on Lake Michigan there are vast temperature differences between seasons, although it is somewhat moderated compared with areas farther inland.

Climate data for Sheboygan, Wisconsin (1991–2020 normals, extremes 1899–present)
Month	Jan	Feb	Mar	Apr	May	Jun	Jul	Aug	Sep	Oct	Nov	Dec	Year
Record high °F (°C)	62 (17)	63 (17)	82 (28)	92 (33)	94 (34)	102 (39)	108 (42)	107 (42)	101 (38)	90 (32)	79 (26)	65 (18)	108 (42)
Mean daily maximum °F (°C)	30.3 (−0.9)	33.3 (0.7)	42.2 (5.7)	52.2 (11.2)	63.2 (17.3)	74.3 (23.5)	81.9 (27.7)	80.1 (26.7)	72.4 (22.4)	59.4 (15.2)	46.5 (8.1)	35.6 (2.0)	55.9 (13.3)
Daily mean °F (°C)	22.5 (−5.3)	25.3 (−3.7)	34.2 (1.2)	44.0 (6.7)	54.6 (12.6)	65.1 (18.4)	72.3 (22.4)	71.0 (21.7)	63.7 (17.6)	50.9 (10.5)	38.8 (3.8)	28.5 (−1.9)	47.6 (8.7)
Mean daily minimum °F (°C)	14.7 (−9.6)	17.3 (−8.2)	26.2 (−3.2)	35.8 (2.1)	46.0 (7.8)	55.9 (13.3)	62.6 (17.0)	61.9 (16.6)	55.0 (12.8)	42.4 (5.8)	31.1 (−0.5)	21.5 (−5.8)	39.2 (4.0)
Record low °F (°C)	−26 (−32)	−25 (−32)	−12 (−24)	10 (−12)	23 (−5)	34 (1)	43 (6)	37 (3)	28 (−2)	14 (−10)	−5 (−21)	−21 (−29)	−26 (−32)
Average precipitation inches (mm)	2.09 (53)	1.72 (44)	2.06 (52)	3.55 (90)	3.70 (94)	4.01 (102)	3.17 (81)	4.03 (102)	2.69 (68)	3.21 (82)	2.39 (61)	2.06 (52)	34.68 (881)
Average precipitation days (≥ 0.01 in)	10.7	8.5	9.7	11.7	12.5	11.5	10.6	9.6	9.5	10.6	10.7	9.8	125.4
Source: NOAA

== Demographics ==
Historical population
Census	Pop.	Note	%±
1860	4,262		—
1870	5,310		24.6%
1880	7,314		37.7%
1890	16,359		123.7%
1900	22,962		40.4%
1910	26,398		15.0%
1920	30,955		17.3%
1930	39,251		26.8%
1940	40,638		3.5%
1950	42,365		4.2%
1960	45,747		8.0%
1970	49,246		7.6%
1980	48,085		−2.4%
1990	49,718		3.4%
2000	50,792		2.2%
2010	49,288		−3.0%
2020	49,929		1.3%
U.S. Decennial Census; 2020 census

=== Racial and ethnic composition ===
Sheboygan city, Wisconsin – racial and ethnic composition Note: the US Census treats Hispanic/Latino as an ethnic category. This table excludes Latinos from the racial categories and assigns them to a separate category. Hispanics/Latinos may be of any race.
Race / ethnicity (NH = Non-Hispanic)	Pop 2000	Pop 2010	Pop 2020	% 2000	% 2010	% 2020
White alone (NH)	43,189	38,102	34,418	85.03%	77.32%	68.93%
Black or African American alone (NH)	410	832	1,557	0.81%	1.69%	3.12%
Native American or Alaska Native alone (NH)	198	209	190	0.39%	0.42%	0.38%
Asian alone (NH)	3,266	4,412	5,495	6.43%	8.95%	11.01%
Native Hawaiian or Pacific Islander alone (NH)	4	6	16	0.01%	0.01%	0.03%
Other race alone (NH)	23	31	160	0.05%	0.06%	0.32%
Mixed-race or multiracial (NH)	668	824	1,864	1.32%	1.67%	3.73%
Hispanic or Latino (any race)	3,034	4,866	6,229	5.97%	9.87%	12.48%
Total	50,792	49,288	49,929	100.00%	100.00%	100.00%

=== 2020 census ===
As of the 2020 census, Sheboygan had a population of 49,929. The population density was 3,192.6 inhabitants per square mile (1,232.7/km^{2}). There were 22,605 housing units at an average density of 1,445.4 per square mile (558.1/km^{2}).

The median age was 37.2 years. 23.9% of residents were under the age of 18 and 15.6% were 65 years of age or older. For every 100 females there were 100.3 males, and for every 100 females age 18 and over there were 98.6 males age 18 and over.

99.9% of residents lived in urban areas, while 0.1% lived in rural areas.

There were 21,041 households, of which 27.7% had children under the age of 18 living in them. Of all households, 38.7% were married-couple households, 23.4% were households with a male householder and no spouse or partner present, and 28.6% were households with a female householder and no spouse or partner present. About 35.5% of all households were made up of individuals and 12.7% had someone living alone who was 65 years of age or older.

Of these housing units, 6.9% were vacant. The homeowner vacancy rate was 1.4% and the rental vacancy rate was 6.7%.

=== 2010 census ===
As of the census of 2010, there were 49,288 people, 20,308 households, and 12,219 families residing in the city. The population density was 3,528.1 inhabitants per square mile (1,362.2/km^{2}). There were 22,339 housing units at an average density of 1,599.1 per square mile (617.4/km^{2}). The racial makeup of the city was 82.5% White, 1.8% African American, 0.5% Native American, 9.0% Asian, 3.6% from other races, and 2.5% from two or more races. Hispanic or Latino people of any race were 9.9% of the population.

There were 20,308 households, of which 30.7% had children under the age of 18 living with them, 43.4% were married couples living together, 11.7% had a female householder with no husband present, 5.1% had a male householder with no wife present, and 39.8% were non-families. Of all households 33.4% were made up of individuals, and 12.1% had someone living alone who was 65 years of age or older. The average household size was 2.38 and the average family size was 3.06.

The median age in the city was 36.2 years. 25.3% of residents were under the age of 18; 8.7% were between the ages of 18 and 24; 27.2% were from 25 to 44; 24.8% were from 45 to 64; and 13.9% were 65 years of age or older. The gender makeup of the city was 49.5% male and 50.5% female.

=== Ethnic communities ===
In 1976, the first three Hmong families settled in Sheboygan with the help of local refugee agencies such as the Grace Episcopal Church and Trinity Lutheran Church. They were refugees from Laos. By 1990, the city had 2,000 residents of Hmong descent, and by December 1999, there were around 5,000 Hmong and Hmong American residents in Sheboygan, 65% of whom were under the age of 18.

In 2006, the Sheboygan Hmong Memorial was installed in the lakefront Deland Park to honor Hmong military and civilian contributions to the Secret War in Laos. The 2010 U.S. Census showed the number of Hmong citizens to be around 4,100 people, putting it fourth in Wisconsin for Hmong populations. Per the 2022 American Community Survey five-year estimates, the Hmong American population was 5,002, the largest Hmong community in Wisconsin after Milwaukee. They are the second largest ethnic group in Sheboygan after those of German descent.

Sheboygan is known for its large ethnic German population comprising roughly 40% of the population. Per the 2022 American Community Survey five-year estimates, the German American population was 19,694. The Mexican American population was 4,589 comprising over 80% of the Latino population.

== Arts and culture ==
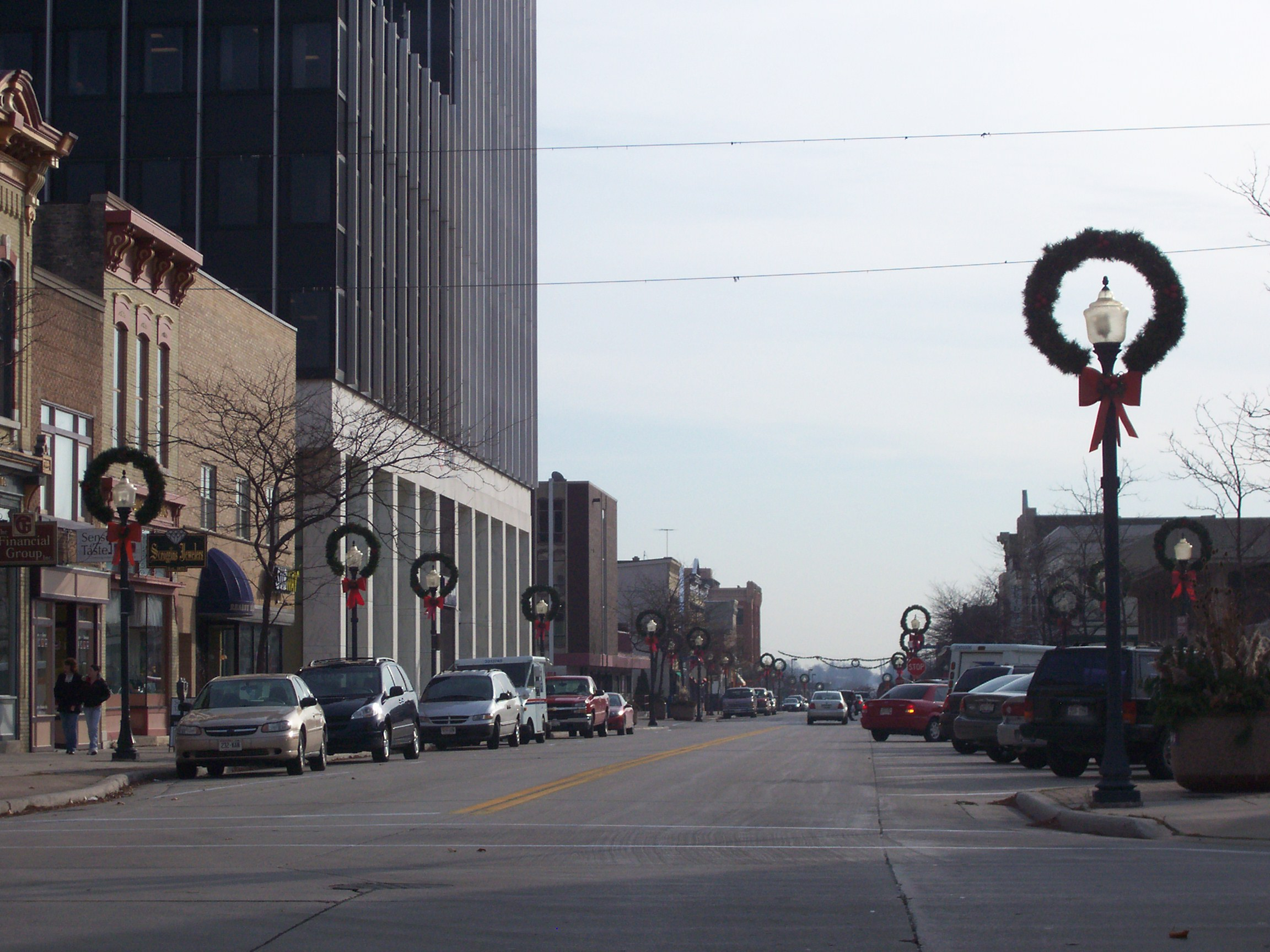
Downtown 8th Street

Museums in Sheboygan include the Above & Beyond Children's Museum and Sheboygan County Historical Museum. The Sheboygan Hmong Memorial recognizes the service and sacrifice of the Hmong people of Laos who fought for the United States during the Secret War from 1961 to 1975, part of the Laotian Civil War. The monument is located within Deland Park along the Lake Michigan shoreline of Sheboygan, which contains one of the larger Hmong communities in the United States.

In April 1894, the schooner Lottie Cooper wrecked just off Sheboygan in a gale. The wreckage was found buried in the harbor during the construction of the Harbor Centre Marina and is now on display in Deland Park, on Sheboygan's lakefront. The free display is the only one of its kind on the Great Lakes.

The Wisconsin Shipwreck Coast National Marine Sanctuary, established in 2021 and the site of a large number of historically significant shipwrecks, lies in the waters of Lake Michigan off Sheboygan.

The John Michael Kohler Arts Center is a contemporary art museum and performing arts complex located in Sheboygan. The center preserves and exhibits artist-built environments and contemporary art. In 2021, the center opened the Art Preserve, a satellite museum space dedicated to art environments.

The city is also home to the historic Stefanie H. Weill Center for the Performing Arts. Sheboygan was the home of The Chordettes, a 1950s group, as well as the thrash metal band Morbid Saint.

=== Brat Days ===
Sheboygan County is well known for its bratwurst. The Sheboygan Jaycees sponsor Brat Days, an annual fund-raising festival that includes the Johnsonville World Bratwurst Eating Championship.

== Parks and recreation ==
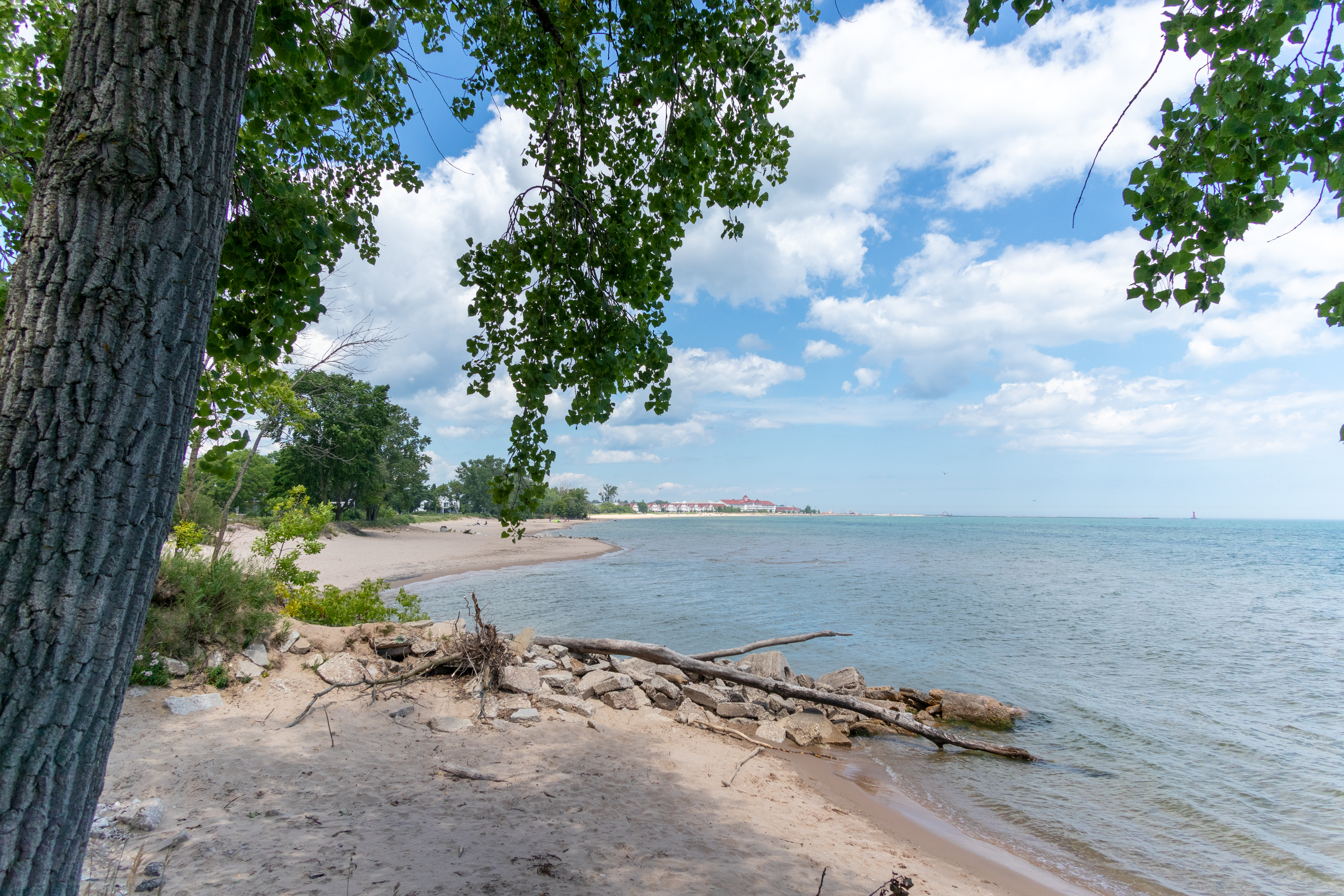
Lake Michigan beach at King Park

Sheboygan is a notable surfing destination and has been called the "Malibu of the Midwest". Sheboygan is considered to be one of the best places to surf in the Great Lakes region. Sheboygan hosted the annual Dairyland Surf Classic from 1988 to 2012, the largest lake surfing competition in the world. Sheboygan's surfing culture was discussed in the 2003 surfing documentary Step into Liquid.

Notable parks in Sheboygan include Ellwood H. May Environmental Park, the Sheboygan Indian Mound Park, and Quarry Beach. Blue Harbor Resort is a resort, water park and conference center in Sheboygan located on Lake Michigan at the mouth of the Sheboygan River. It opened in June 2004 after being built by Great Wolf Resorts.

=== Trails ===
The city has a trail along the Highway 23 corridor leading to the Old Plank Road Trail to the west of Sheboygan that uses dedicated paths and bike lanes, along with a lakefront trail between Pennsylvania and Park avenues along Broughton Drive. Several bike routes are marked in the city using existing streets and roads to demarcate separate bike lanes. Since 2018, Sheboygan has held a bronze-level bicycle-friendly community award from the League of American Bicyclists.

A 2013 project created a north-south trail using the former Chicago & Northwestern Railroad right-of-way known as the "Shoreline 400" between Pennsylvania and North avenues, with future expansion to the south planned. A 2016 project added a trail along the Taylor Drive corridor, and improvements to the south to allow an eventual connection to the Ozaukee Interurban Trail are proposed for a future date.

== Government ==
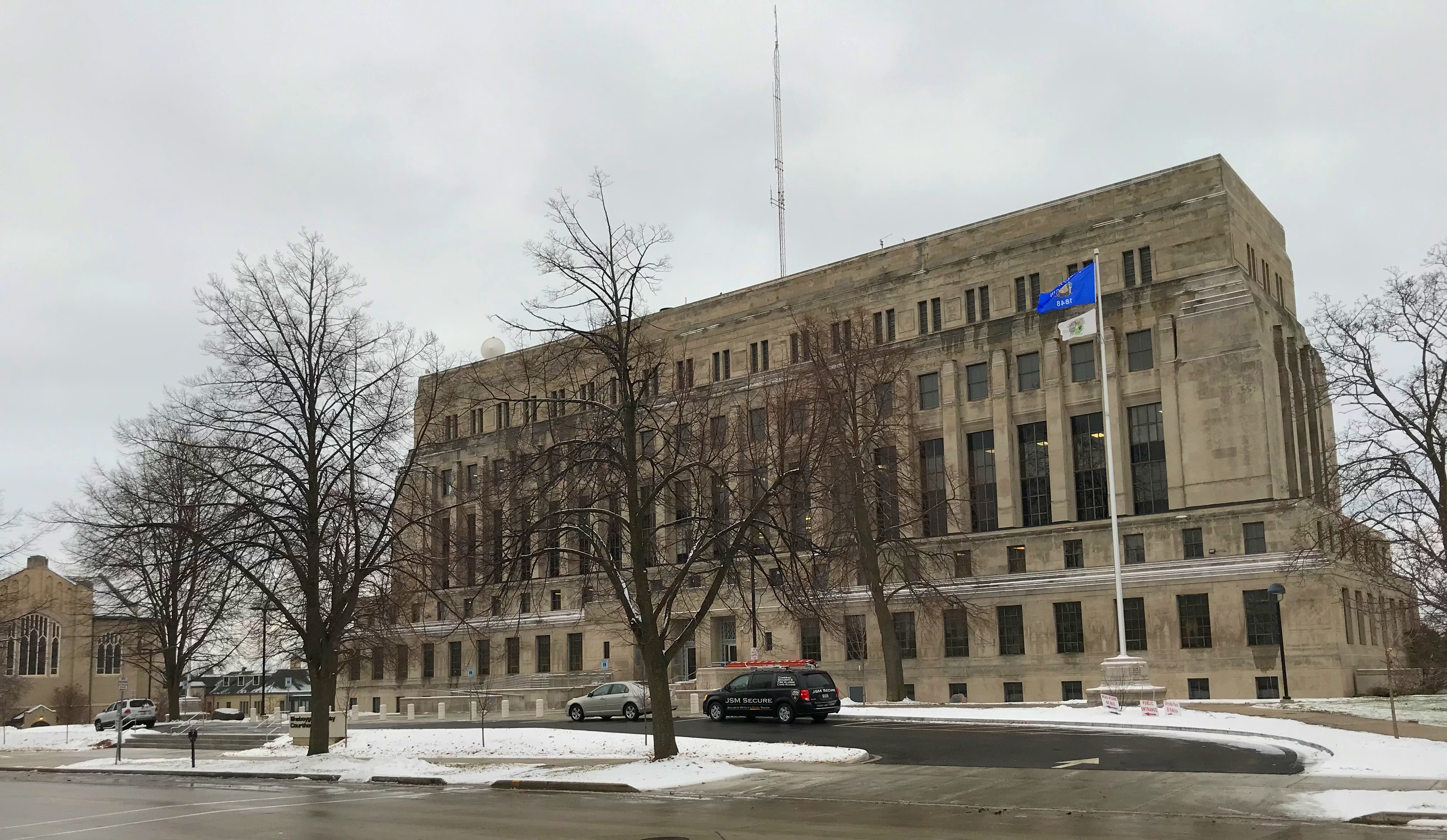
Sheboygan County Courthouse

=== Local government ===
Sheboygan has a mayor–council form of government. The full-time mayor is elected by general election for a term of four years, with no term limits and to an officially non-partisan position. The common council consists of ten alderpersons representing the city's ten aldermanic districts, with a council president and vice-president presiding over them. A city administrator oversees the day-to-day administration of the city and is appointed by the common council.

Sheboygan's 1916-built City Hall was remodeled throughout 2018 and into 2019, being re-dedicated on September 3, 2019, with a new north frontage becoming the building's new main entrance and making the building's vintage three-story staircase its most prominent feature within a new atrium.

The Sheboygan Police Department is the law enforcement agency in the city. Civil and criminal law cases are heard in the Sheboygan County Circuit Court, with municipal citations for Sheboygan and Kohler handled through the city's municipal court within the police headquarters building. The Sheboygan Fire Department provides fire protection, rescue, emergency, and non-emergency medical services, code enforcement, and education, operating out of five fire stations throughout the city.

=== State and federal representation ===
Sheboygan is represented in the Wisconsin State Assembly by Joe Sheehan as part of the 26th district. The city is also represented in the State Senate as part of the 9th district (Devin LeMahieu, R–Oostburg).

Sheboygan is in the 6th congressional district of Wisconsin, which is represented by Republican congressman Glenn Grothman.

== Education ==
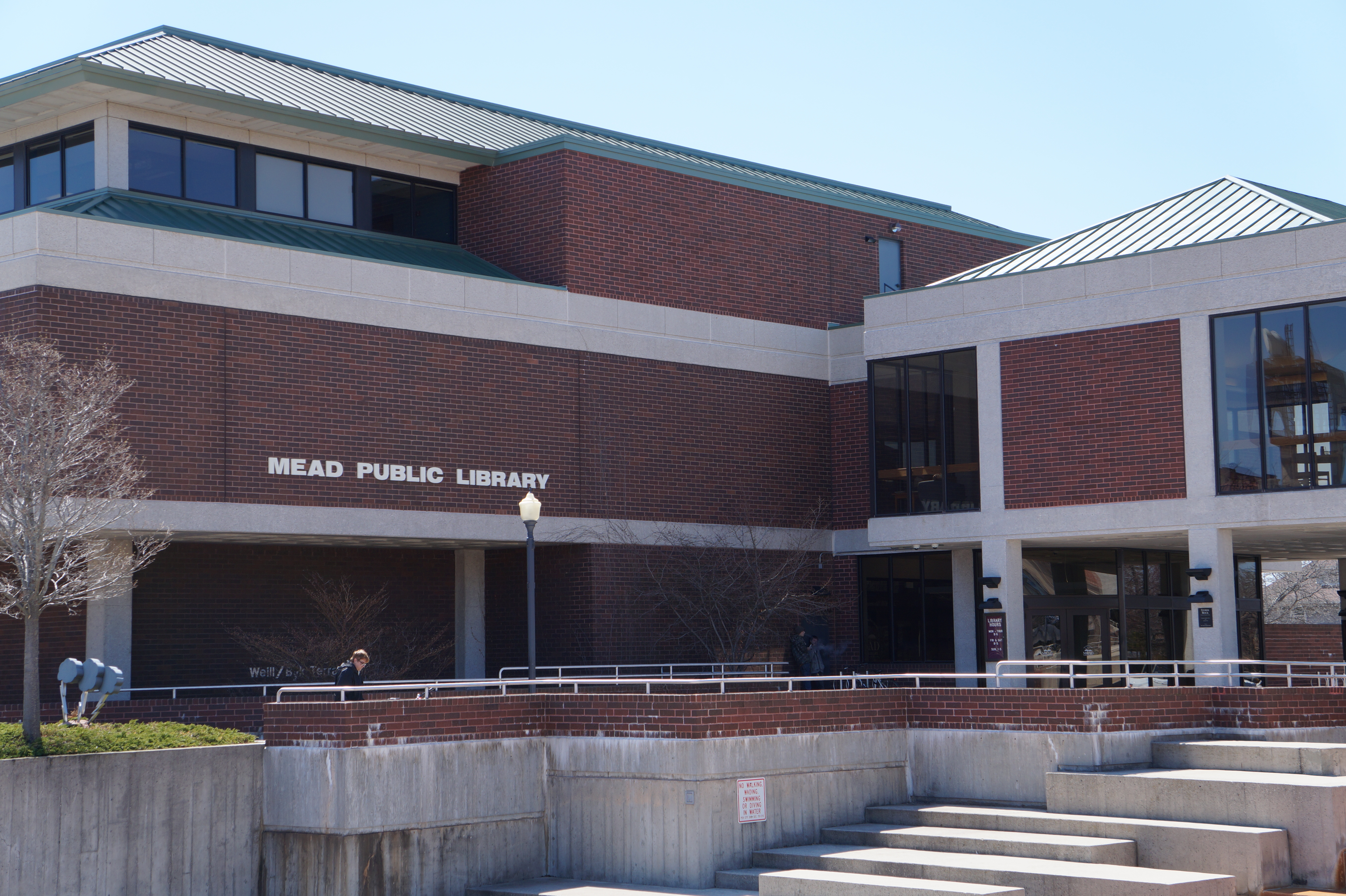
Mead Public Library

Sheboygan public schools are administered by the Sheboygan Area School District.

=== High schools ===
High schools within the city include:

- Sheboygan North High School
- Sheboygan South High School
- Sheboygan Area Lutheran High School
- George D. Warriner High School
- Sheboygan Christian School
- Étude High School
- Sheboygan Central High School

The school district was the first in Wisconsin to operate an FM radio station, WSHS (91.7). Since 1996, Sheboygan has had a high school program, Rockets for Schools, where students build and launch 8-and-20-foot-tall (2.4 and 6.1 m) rockets.

=== Colleges ===
- University of Wisconsin–Green Bay Sheboygan Campus
- Lakeshore Technical College (satellite campus)

== Media ==
The city's daily newspaper is Gannett's The Sheboygan Press, which has been published since 1907. The Sheboygan Sun also provides local news coverage through its website, while the Beacon is published by the same company as The Plymouth Review and Sheboygan Falls News; the latter two have print editions mailed out weekly to all residents. The Gannett-owned Shoreline Chronicle contains Press "best-of" content, and is door-delivered and is also distributed with the Wednesday Press.

The city is served by television and radio stations in Green Bay and Milwaukee. Nielsen's television division places Sheboygan within the Milwaukee market, although Green Bay stations also report news, events, and weather warnings pertaining to Sheboygan and target the city with advertising.

Nielsen Audio places Sheboygan and Sheboygan County within one radio market, and several stations serve the area. Midwest Communications owns four stations within the county, including talk station WHBL (1330, with a translator station at 101.5 FM which transmits strongly due to its high tower height across most its service area; country station WBFM (93.7); CHR/Top 40 WXER (104.5 from Plymouth, with a translator at 96.1 FM in Sheboygan); and active rock Sheboygan Falls-licensed WHBZ (106.5). WCLB (950, translated on 107.3) also serves the city from its Sheboygan Falls transmitter, repeating Plymouth's WGXI (1420, translated on 98.5), a classic country station. The Sheboygan Area School District's high school radio station, WSHS (91.7), provides school programming and the Wisconsin Public Radio Music Network.

Various religious stations originating from Milwaukee and north of Green Bay and a translator for Kiel's WSTM (91.3), and NOAA Weather Radio station WWG91 broadcast from several towers in the city, mainly from a tower along Interstate 43 north of Superior Avenue, with a WVCY-FM translator at 9.49 broadcasting from the county-owned communications tower atop Taylor Hill by the Sheboygan County Historical Museum. WYVM acts as a full-power relay of Suring's WRVN (102.7), which has a religious teaching format.

The city is served by Spectrum and U-verse, with public-access television cable TV programming provided to both systems from WSCS, and SASD-TV features school board meetings, with both channels featuring meetings and other content through their websites and YouTube. The city at one time had a translator of the Trinity Broadcasting Network, WPVS-LP (channel 16/20 analog), which went off the air following the digital switchover and has since moved to Milwaukee; WHBL also attempted to establish a television sister station several times, without success.

== Infrastructure ==
=== Transportation ===
Shoreline Metro transfer point

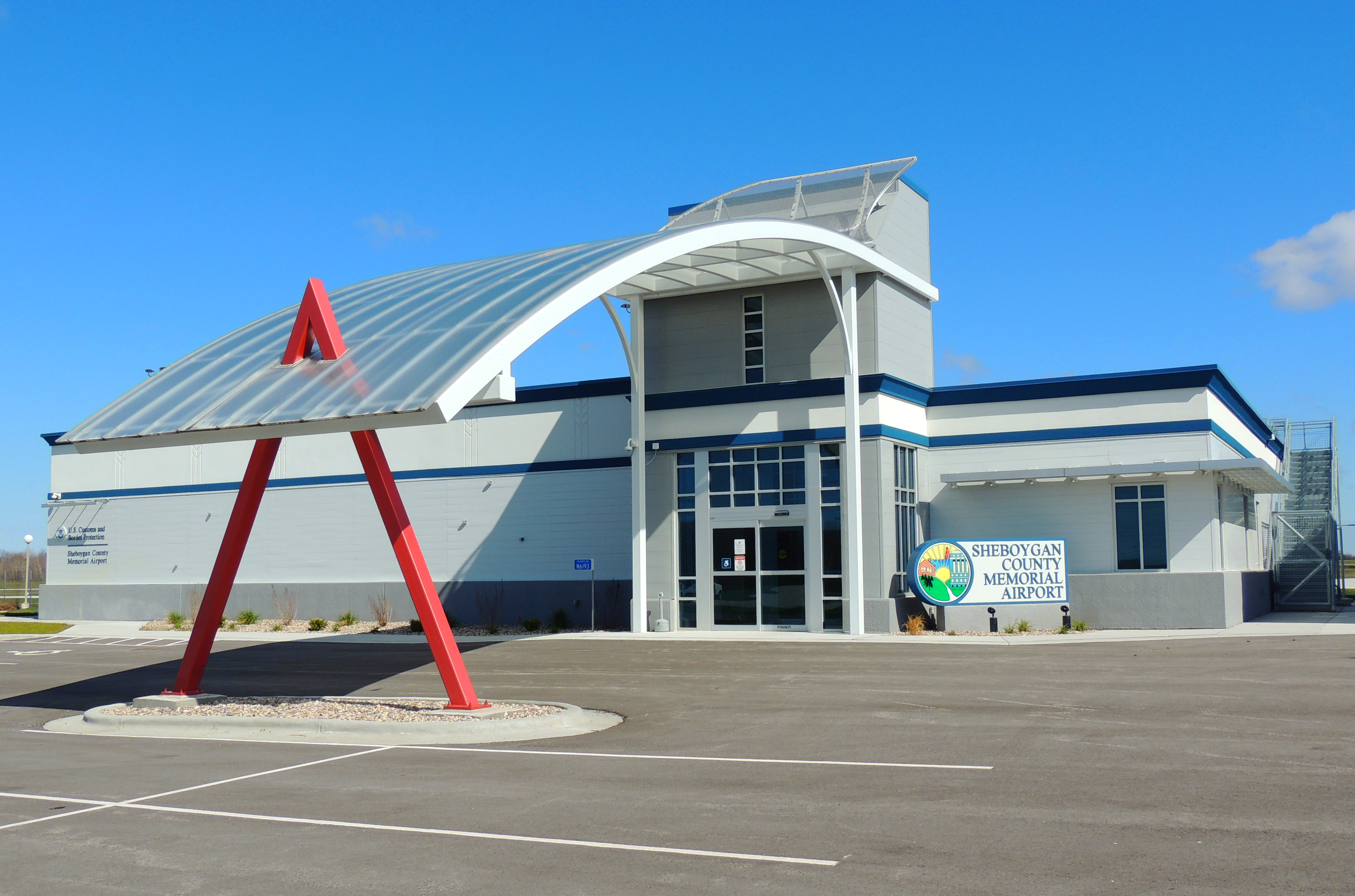
U.S. Customs and Border Protection facility at Sheboygan County Memorial Airport

==== Roads ====
Interstate 43 is the primary north-south transportation route into Sheboygan, and forms the west boundary of the city. U.S. Route 141 was the primary north-south route into Sheboygan before Interstate 43 was built, and its former route is a major north-south route through the center of the city that is referred to as Calumet Drive coming into the city from the north, and South Business Drive/Sauk Trail Road from the south; between Superior and Georgia Avenues within the city's original plat, the highway is known as 14th Street. Four-lane Highway 23 is the primary west route into the city, and leads into the city up to North 25th Street as a freeway as Kohler Memorial Drive. Other state highways in the city include Highway 42, Highway 28, which both run mostly along the former inner-city routing of U.S. 141. Secondary county highways include County Trunk Highway DL (CTH-DL) and the decommissioned CTH-LS to the north; CTH-J, CTH-O, CTH-PP, and CTH-EE to the west; and CTH-KK to the south.

For addressing purposes, the city's north-south zero point is Pennsylvania Avenue (increasing from 500 past that line in both directions), while west addressing zeroes out at the extreme eastern point of Superior Avenue at Lake Michigan (Sheboygan and Sheboygan County have no east addresses, and the little land existing northeast of that point stretches out the six '100 blocks' eastward with x50-x90 numbers not otherwise used in most other addresses in Sheboygan).

==== Public transit ====
Shoreline Metro provides public bus transit throughout the city, as well as in Kohler and Sheboygan Falls. All routes depart from the Metro Center, more commonly known as the "Transfer Point" located in the downtown.

Jefferson Lines and Indian Trails serve Sheboygan at the Metro Center, providing transportation to Milwaukee (and an Amtrak Thruway connection to the Milwaukee Intermodal Station) and Green Bay.

==== Rail ====
Historically the city was connected to Milwaukee, Chicago and Green Bay via the Milwaukee Interurban Lines, the Chicago & North Western Railroad and the Milwaukee Road. These railroads' passenger services were abandoned during the mid-20th century but in 2008 the Wisconsin Department of Transportation proposed to reestablish passenger service to Milwaukee and Green Bay via Fond du Lac and the cities along Lake Winnebago's west shore, though political complications in the 2010s have since mothballed rail expansion in Wisconsin.

==== Airport ====
Sheboygan is served by the county-owned non-commercial Sheboygan County Memorial Airport (KSBM) three miles northwest of the city.

==== Water ====
Sheboygan is bounded on the east by Lake Michigan. The city has no active port in the 21st century. Blue Harbor Resort is located on a peninsula between the lake and the Sheboygan River's last bend. This site was formerly used as the headquarters of the C. Reiss Coal Company (now a Koch Industries division). It was their base of operations for ships to load and unload coal for delivery along the peninsula.

The Sheboygan River passes through the city, but dams in Sheboygan Falls prevent navigation upriver. Tall-masted boats are confined to the river downstream of the Pennsylvania Avenue bridge. Commercial charter fishing boats dock near the mouth of the river.

=== Hospitals ===
Two hospitals serve the city. Aurora Medical Center – Sheboygan County opened in July 2022 under Aurora Health Care. St. Nicholas Hospital operates as part of the Hospital Sisters Health System.

== Notable people ==
- Peter Bartzen, Wisconsin state representative
- James Baumgart, Wisconsin state senator
- Theodore Benfey, Wisconsin state senator
- Thomas M. Blackstock, politician and businessman
- Archie Bleyer, music director
- Helen Boatwright, opera singer and educator
- Vernon R. Boeckmann, Wisconsin state representative and sheriff
- Ray Buivid, football player
- Charles Burhop, politician
- The Chordettes, singing quartet
- Elijah Fox Cook, Wisconsin state senator
- Sam Dekker, professional basketball player
- Ambrose Delos DeLand, Wisconsin legislator
- Fred A. Dennett, Wisconsin state senator
- John M. Detling, Wisconsin state representative
- Valentine Detling, Wisconsin state representative and businessman
- Theodore Dieckmann, Wisconsin legislator
- John Dittrich, NFL player
- Jerry Donohue, major contributor toward DNA identification
- Bill Dwyre, editor and columnist, Los Angeles Times
- John W. Eber, speaker of the Wisconsin State Assembly
- Simon Gillen, Wisconsin state representative and jurist
- Bernard O. Gruenke, artist
- Fred C. Haack, one of two first Socialist candidates (with August Mohr) elected to office in America
- Lorenzo D. Harvey, superintendent of Public Instruction of Wisconsin
- Timothy Hasenstein, painter
- Joe Hauser, Major League Baseball player
- Herman Heinecke, Wisconsin state assembly
- Henry A. Hillemann, Wisconsin state representative and lawyer
- Harrison Carroll Hobart, Union Army general
- William E. Hoehle, Wisconsin state representative
- Curt W. Janke, Wisconsin state representative
- Marvin John Jensen, U.S. Navy admiral
- John H. Jones, Wisconsin state senator
- Jacob Jung, Wisconsin state representative and businessman
- William G. Kaufmann, politician and businessman
- Edward J. Kempf, Wisconsin state representative
- Ernest Keppler, politician and jurist
- John J. Koepsell, Wisconsin state representative and businessman
- John Michael Kohler, industrialist, founder of Kohler Company and mayor of Sheboygan
- Terry Jodok Kohler, industrialist
- Walter J. Kohler Jr., governor of Wisconsin
- Walter J. Kohler Sr., governor of Wisconsin
- Conrad Krez, Union Army general, Wisconsin state representative
- Frederick W. Krez, Wisconsin state representative
- Eloise Kummer, actress
- Imogen LaChance, social reformer
- Wesley Lau, actor
- Joe Leibham, lobbyist and former Wisconsin state senator
- Debbie Lesko, U.S. representative from Arizona
- Frank J. Lingelbach, Wisconsin state representative
- Rick Majerus, NCAA and NBA basketball coach
- Anthony Martin, escape artist
- Jackie Mason, comedian and actor
- Pat Matzdorf, high jump world record holder
- Don McNeill, radio host of The Breakfast Club
- Doxie Moore, former NBA head coach for the Sheboygan Red Skins
- Charles E. Morris, Wisconsin state representative
- Martha Nause, golfer
- Otto C. Neumeister, Wisconsin state representative
- Fred E. Nuernberg, Wisconsin state representative
- William J. Nuss, Wisconsin state representative
- Carl Otte, Wisconsin legislator
- Benjamin Hoskins Paddock, father of Stephen Paddock, perpetrator of the 2017 Las Vegas shooting
- Dennis T. Phalen, Wisconsin state senator
- Roy Pirrung, marathon runner and motivational speaker
- Cora Scott Pond Pope, teacher, scriptwriter, real estate developer
- Calvin Potter, Wisconsin state senator
- Valentine P. Rath, Wisconsin state representative
- Henry Otto Reinnoldt, Wisconsin state representative
- Wilbur M. Root, Wisconsin state representative
- George Sauer Jr., NFL player
- John Schneider Jr., Wisconsin state representative
- Bill Schroeder, football player (wide receiver)
- Bill Schroeder, professional football player (halfback)
- Carl Schuette, NFL player
- David N. Senty, U.S. Air Force major general
- James McMillan Shafter, jurist and legislator
- E. E. Smith, science fiction author
- Horatio N. Smith, Wisconsin state senator
- Ernest A. Sonnemann, Wisconsin state representative
- Adolphus Frederic St. Sure, judge
- David Taylor, judge
- Joseph M. Theisen, Wisconsin state representative
- Michelle Tuzee, ABC news anchor, Los Angeles
- Edward Voigt, U.S. representative
- Jacob Vollrath, industrialist
- Joseph Wedig, Wisconsin state representative
- A. Matt Werner, attorney and newspaper publisher
- Gustavis A. Willard, Wisconsin state representative
- William Te Winkle, Wisconsin state senator
- George W. Wolff, Wisconsin state representative and senator
- Helen Sumner Woodbury, economist, academic, historian and public official
- Carl Zillier, Wisconsin state representative

== In popular culture ==
- The Creature That Ate Sheboygan is a science fiction board game released in 1979 by Simulations Publications.

== Sister cities ==
Sheboygan's sister cities are:

- Esslingen am Neckar, Baden-Württemberg, Germany
- Tsubame, Niigata, Japan

Sheboygan has student exchanges with Esslingen, and has had student exchanges with Tsubame in the past.

== See also ==
- List of sundown towns in the United States
- Sheboygan Red Skins, an early professional basketball franchise of the NBA
