= National Register of Historic Places listings in Sheboygan County, Wisconsin =

Location of Sheboygan County in Wisconsin

This is a list of the National Register of Historic Places listings in Sheboygan County, Wisconsin. It is intended to provide a comprehensive listing of entries in the National Register of Historic Places that are located in Sheboygan County, Wisconsin. The locations of National Register properties for which the latitude and longitude coordinates are included below may be seen in a map.

There are 64 properties and districts listed on the National Register in the county.

This National Park Service list is complete through NPS recent listings posted September 11, 2026.

== Current listings ==
	Name on the Register	Image	Date listed	Location	City or town	Description
1	Abiah (schooner) Shipwreck		June 16, 2022 (#100007799)	13.1 miles (21.1 km) northeast of the Sheboygan Harbor Lighthouse in Lake Michigan; 43°48′07″N 87°26′17″W	Haven vicinity	134-foot wooden schooner (or maybe a brig?) built in 1847 at Charles Stevens' shipyard in Irving, New York. Hauled grain, lumber, and railroad hardware on the Great Lakes until September 1855, when it capsized in a squall while sailing from Chicago to Oconto.
2	Advance (schooner) Shipwreck		July 5, 2023 (#100009104)	9.5 miles (15.3 km) south of the Sheboygan Harbor entrance, in Lake Michigan; 43°36′42″N 87°42′58″W	Holland vicinity	117-foot wooden two-masted schooner built in 1853 by James M. Jones of Milwaukee. Hauled lumber and grain on the Great Lakes until 1885, when it sank in a gale while carrying a load of tan bark. Four sailors drowned and one survived.
3	American Club	American Club	May 22, 1978 (#78000141)	419 Highland Drive; 43°44′23″N 87°46′51″W	Kohler	Originally a generous dormitory at Kohler Village where immigrant employees could be housed and Americanized. Designed by Richard Philipp in a loosely Tudor style and built in 1918. Now a hotel and restaurant.
4	Atlanta (steam screw) Shipwreck	Atlanta (steam screw) Shipwreck	November 6, 2017 (#100001785)	1.02 miles north-northeast of the Amsterdam Park boat launch in Lake Michigan	Cedar Grove	200-foot screw steamer built in 1891 by the Cleveland Dry Dock Company for Goodrich Transport. Served as a packet boat, transporting passengers and freight around Lake Michigan. Caught fire March 18, 1906 heading from Sheboygan to Milwaukee, and abandoned, with one man lost.
5	Badger State Tanning Company	Badger State Tanning Company	September 6, 2018 (#100002888)	1031 Maryland Ave. 43°44′43″N 87°43′02″W	Sheboygan	Brick factory complex where the Armour Leather Company tanned skins from their slaughterhouses. The complex was designed by Juul and Smith, and begun in 1919. After WWII, it was the largest employer in Sheboygan.
6	John Balzer Wagon Works Complex	John Balzer Wagon Works Complex	December 23, 1993 (#92000028)	818-820, 820A Pennsylvania Ave. 43°45′00″N 87°42′48″W	Sheboygan	Very-intact 3-story brick wagon factory with elevator, built in 1887. Shifted around 1915 from wagons to building car and truck bodies, then shifted to a general welding shop around 1938.
7	Thomas M. and Bridget Blackstock House	Thomas M. and Bridget Blackstock House	March 17, 1995 (#95000256)	507 Washington Ct. 43°45′13″N 87°42′29″W	Sheboygan	Italianate home built in 1882. Both Thomas and Bridget were Irish immigrants. He supervised on the Sheboygan and Fond du Lac Plank Road, ran a pier, a drug store, the Phoenix Chair Company, and various other enterprises. Later served as mayor, state assemblyman, etc.
8	Byron (schooner) Shipwreck		May 20, 2009 (#09000368)	Off Oostburg in Lake Michigan; 43°36′17″N 87°41′17″W	Oostburg	36-foot wooden schooner - probably the Byron, which was built around 1849 for William Burmeister and hauled lumber and merchandise around Lake Michigan. It sank in 1867 carrying merchandise for two stores in Manitowoc, after colliding with a larger ship.
9	Cole Historic District	Cole Historic District	December 1, 1988 (#88002696)	501 and 517 Monroe St. and 504, 508, and 516-518 Water St. 43°43′43″N 87°48′32″W	Sheboygan Falls	This block within a bend of the Sheboygan River was once the first permanent settlement in Sheboygan County, clustered around a mill. It consists of the 1837 Mill House, the 1842 Charles Cole home, the 1846 Cole Brothers house, the 1846 Thorp Hotel, and the 1848 Cole Store - all in Greek Revival style.
10	Downtown Churches Historic District	Downtown Churches Historic District	March 1, 2010 (#10000052)	Generally bounded by Erie Ave., N. 6th St., Ontario Ave., and N. 7th St. 43°45′21″N 87°42′37″W	Sheboygan	Cluster of religious buildings near downtown Sheboygan: the Greek Revival-styled Grace Episcopal Church Rectory built in the 1850s, the 1867-71 High Victorian Gothic Grace Episcopal Church, the 1929 Neogothic First Methodist Episcopal Church, the 1937 Neogothic Hope Reformed Church, and the 1968 Contemporary-styled St. Mark Lutheran Church.
11	Downtown Historic District	Downtown Historic District	December 27, 1984 (#84000691)	Roughly bounded by Broadway, Monroe, Pine, and Buffalo Sts., and the Sheboygan River; 43°43′41″N 87°48′43″W	Sheboygan Falls	The old downtown, including the 1848 Italianate Hill woolen shawl mill, the 1877 frame Queen Anne Martha Whipple Music Store, the 1878 block of Osthelder Saloon, Sully's Dry Goods, Thiemann Grocery and Bryant Drug Store, the 1880 Brickner Woolen Mills, the 1880 Victorian Smith Meat Market and Post Office, the 1894 Queen Anne Dr. Pfeifer Office, the 1895 Queen Anne Schlichting Grocery, and the 1880-1920 Weisse Tannery.
12	Downtown Plymouth Historic District	Downtown Plymouth Historic District	June 23, 2016 (#16000421)	Generally bounded by the 100, 200, 300 & 400 blocks of E. Mill St. 43°44′51″N 87°58′39″W	Plymouth	The old downtown, with 46 contributing properties including the 1877 Italianate Odd Fellows Block, the 1894 Italianate/Queen Anne Radloff Building, the 1905 20th Century Commercial-styled Exchange Building, the 1910 Crystal-Majestic Theater, and the 1920 Tudor Revival Dahl Brothers Garage.
13	Elkhart Lake Road Race Circuits	Elkhart Lake Road Race Circuits	February 17, 2006 (#06000053)	Cty Hwys, J, P, JP, A, and Lake St. 43°49′40″N 88°01′45″W	Elkhart Lake	This 6.5 circuit of public roads (mostly county highways) was used for European-style road races once a year from 1950 to 1952. During the brief time when racing was allowed on public roads in the U.S., Elkhart Lake was a major venue in the Midwest.
14	Henry Store Foeste Building	Henry Store Foeste Building	September 1, 1995 (#95001063)	522 S. Eighth St. 43°44′57″N 87°42′47″W	Sheboygan	2-story Neoclassical building designed by William C. Weeks and built 1892-93. Foeste was a German immigrant, Sheboygan industrialist, hotel owner, and developer. The building was occupied by the public library, saloons, and a printing firm.
15	Franklin Feed Mill	Franklin Feed Mill	April 11, 1985 (#85000792)	Franklin Rd. 43°50′07″N 87°54′09″W	Franklin	Water-powered gristmill on the Sheboygan River, built by Henry Dickoff and Conrad Arpke, immigrants from Lipper Detmold, in 1856 during the wheat boom. Expanded around 1868 and upgraded from water wheel to turbines. Grinding went from stones to roller mill to hammermill.
16	Friendship House	Friendship House	July 10, 1974 (#74000331)	721 Ontario Ave. 43°45′18″N 87°42′42″W	Sheboygan	Fine Italianate villa with large cupola, built around 1872 for John Pfeiler who owned the Park Hotel on the same block. In 1910 the Kohler Foundation bought the building and it has since housed disadvantaged children.
17	Garton Toy Company	Garton Toy Company	May 11, 2000 (#00000493)	746, 810, 830 N. Water St., 1104 Wisconsin Ave. 43°45′12″N 87°43′08″W	Sheboygan	Third toy factory built by Eusebius Bassingdale Garton starting in 1930, after the second factory burned. Garton built red coaster wagons, croquet sets, velocipedes, pedal cars, etc., with a peak of 800 employees.
18	Glenbeulah Mill/Grist Mill	Glenbeulah Mill/Grist Mill	December 27, 1984 (#84000678)	Gardner St. 43°47′47″N 88°02′37″W	Glenbeulah	2 1/2-story frame mill built in 1857 by Yankees Swift, Dillingham, Slade & Dillingham. Probably used an overshot waterwheel to grind wheat to ship to the East Coast. Expanded in 1863 to also power a hub and spoke factory.
19	Gooseville Mill/Grist Mill	Gooseville Mill/Grist Mill	December 27, 1984 (#84000673)	Silver Creek-Cascade Rd. 43°35′16″N 88°01′14″W	Adell	2-story wooden mill on a stone foundation built by Henry Schulz in 1879, with a functional pod, dam and mill race. Originally ground grain; in later years sawed lumber.
20	Hetty Taylor (shipwreck)		June 1, 2005 (#05000535)	Lake Michigan, 7 mi. SE of Sheboygan R. 43°41′00″N 87°39′17″W	Sheboygan	84-foot two-masted schooner built in 1874 by Allen, McClelland and Co. of Milwaukee. Hauled wood products and merchandise around Lake Michigan until August 1880, when she sank in a squall.
21	Hotel Laack	Hotel Laack	December 2, 1985 (#85003095)	52 Stafford St. 43°44′50″N 87°58′39″W	Plymouth	3-story hotel designed by Charles Hilpertshauser in Queen Anne style and built in 1892 for H. C. Laack. It had a sample room where salesmen showed their wares, and stood across the street from the Plymouth Cheese Exchange.
22	Henry H. Huson House and Water Tower	Henry H. Huson House and Water Tower	November 28, 1980 (#80000196)	405 Collins St. 43°44′44″N 87°58′34″W	Plymouth	Eclectic house built in 1871 and expanded in 1873, with a 3-story wooden water tower across the street, once topped by a windmill. Huson built the water tower privately in 1887, before city water.
23	I.A. JOHNSON Shipwreck (Scow Schooner)	I.A. JOHNSON Shipwreck (Scow Schooner)	June 10, 2019 (#100004028)	Address Restricted	Mosel vicinity	84-foot wood-hulled 2-masted scow-schooner built in 1867 by J.A. Johnson of Dover Bay. Carried lumber, hay, feed, corn and pork. Bought in 1880 by the Freyberg Brothers of Washington Island to carry lumber to their mill in Sheboygan and return with groceries. Sank in 1890 after hitting a schooner.
24	Henry and Charles Imig Block	Henry and Charles Imig Block	July 9, 1998 (#98000849)	625-629 N. Eighth St. 43°45′11″N 87°42′45″W	Sheboygan	2-story High Victorian Italianate triple store with polychromatic brickwork and an elaborate cornice, built in 1881-82. The two Imigs were Sheboygan's most successful clothing sellers. The block also housed their brother Jacob's boot and shoe store and a drugstore.
25	Jung Carriage Factory	Jung Carriage Factory	July 10, 1974 (#74000125)	829-835 Pennsylvania Ave. 43°44′59″N 87°42′52″W	Sheboygan	1885 2-story factory with timber frame clad in cream brick with Richardsonian Romanesque stylings. Jacob Jung's company built carriages, wagons and sleighs.
26	Jung Shoe Manufacturing Company Factory	Jung Shoe Manufacturing Company Factory	January 22, 1992 (#91001993)	620 S. Eighth St. 43°44′53″N 87°42′47″W	Sheboygan	2-story U-shaped factory designed by Sheboygan architect William C. Weeks in Neoclassical style and built from 1906 to 1912 for Henry and Otto Jung.
27	Kletzien Mound Group (47-SB-61)	Kletzien Mound Group (47-SB-61)	July 23, 1981 (#81000061)	5000 South 9th Street; 43°41′45″N 87°43′08″W	Sheboygan	Effigy mounds within Sheboygan Indian Mound Park, including deer mounds, panther, linear, oval and conical mounds. Adam Kletzien protected these mounds from the 1920s to 1952.
28	Kohler Company Factory Complex	Kohler Company Factory Complex	April 6, 2001 (#01000318)	444 Highland Dr. 43°44′28″N 87°46′34″W	Kohler	Large, very intact complex of the Kohler Company, located in the planned community of Kohler, including the enamel shop begun in 1901, the foundry begun in 1920, the 1925 office building (pictured), and the pottery building begun in 1928.
29	John Michael Kohler House	John Michael Kohler House	November 30, 1982 (#82001850)	608 New York Ave. 43°45′08″N 87°42′35″W	Sheboygan	Italianate house built in 1882 for Austrian immigrant and Kohler Company founder John Michael. Refashioned around 1920 by Richard Philipp for Walter Sr. Now houses the Kohler Arts Center.
30	Rudolph Lueder 13 Sided Barn	Rudolph Lueder 13 Sided Barn	November 7, 2016 (#16000768)	W4651 Cty. Rd. J 43°47′21″N 87°55′46″W	Plymouth	Large 48-cow centric barn, built 1915-16 by Adolph Suhrke, with a double-brick wall, an air circulation system, and a silo in the middle. The 13th side is extra long for the barn door. Still used for dairy, as of 2016.
31	Mission House Historic District	Mission House Historic District	December 20, 1984 (#84001221)	County Trunk M 43°50′31″N 87°52′44″W	Herman	Historic buildings of Mission House Seminary and College of the German Reformed Church, including the 1888 Victorian Gothic Recitation Hall, the 1917 Neoclassical Jubilee Dormitory, the 1924 Colonial Revival Dr. Darms Residence, and the 1932 Founders' Gymnasium and Auditorium. Now part of Lakeland College.
32	Mojave Shipwreck (Barkentine)		June 4, 2024 (#100010469)	Address Restricted; 43°48′23″N 87°27′16″W	Mosel vicinity	136-foot 3-masted wood-hulled barkentine built in 1863 in Stewart McDonald's shipyard in Detroit - built to fit through the Welland Canal. She hauled hay, wood and wheat around the Great Lakes. In November 1864, hauling wheat from Chicago to Buffalo, she sank in a storm off Sheboygan, with five men lost.
33	Montgomery shipwreck (schooner)		September 13, 2019 (#100004377)	In Lake Michigan, O.45 miles east of Whistling Straights Golf Course; 43°51′03″N 87°42′53″W	Mosel	136-foot wooden schooner built in 1853 by J. Oades of Clayton, NY and rigged as a barkentine named Northern Light. In 1866 a second centerboard was added and she was rerigged as a 3-masted schooner. In November 1890, hauling 700 tons of coal, a gale drove her onto rocks where she broke up.
34	Onion River Flouring Mill/Grist Mill		December 27, 1984 (#84000679)	Hwy 57; 43°40′32″N 87°56′28″W	Waldo	Gristmill on the Onion River with oldest section built in 1859 by Abner Heald and Mark and Alonzo Martin. It once shipped flour from the docks of Sheboygan to Boston and New York.
35	Plymouth Post Office	Plymouth Post Office	October 24, 2000 (#00001242)	302 E. Main St. 43°44′57″N 87°58′37″W	Plymouth	1-story Art Moderne-styled federal post office built in 1940 with help form the Public Works Administration, with a 1941 mural, "Cheese Making" by Charles W. Thwaites in the lobby.
36	Eliza Prange House	Eliza Prange House	April 28, 2015 (#15000189)	605 Erie Ave. 43°45′23″N 87°42′37″W	Sheboygan	Mediterranean Revival-style house designed by William C. Weeks and built in 1923 for Eliza Prange, a founder of the Prange department store chain.
37	Charles T. and Gertrude Rietz House	Charles T. and Gertrude Rietz House	July 6, 2018 (#100002649)	W6582 State Trunk Hwy. 144; 43°33′25″N 88°01′31″W	Silver Creek	2.5-story home designed by Leenhouts and Guthrie and built in 1903, which combines Craftsman style with Queen Anne Free Classic style. Charles operated the Rietz Distillery.
38	Riverbend	Riverbend	December 4, 1980 (#80000197)	1161 W Lower Falls Rd. 43°43′44″N 87°47′26″W	Kohler	Estate of Walter J. Kohler Sr. on a bend of the Sheboygan River, built to resemble an English manor. The rambling Tudor Revival house was designed by Richard Philipp and built 1921-23, and the grounds were designed by the Olmsted Brothers.
39	Robert C. Pringle (tug) Shipwreck	Robert C. Pringle (tug) Shipwreck	December 14, 2020 (#100005902)	8 miles (13 km) SE of the Sheboygan harbor entrance in L. Michigan; 43°41′30″N 87°33′18″W	Wilson	101-foot wood-hulled screw steamer built in 1903 by Manitowoc Shipbuilding. Carried package freight around the Apostle Islands briefly, then carried passengers to Whitefish Bay Park until 1908 for Frederick Pabst. Sank in June 1922 while towing the steamer Venezuela for the Pringle Barge Line, after hitting a submerged object.
40	Charles Robinson House	Charles Robinson House	December 20, 1984 (#84001125)	Center St., Old Wade House State Park; 43°46′34″N 88°05′10″W	Greenbush	Elegant Greek Revival house with a widow's walk and an unusual veranda, built by Robinson, a carpenter, real estate speculator, and son-in-law to Sylvanus Wade, probably around 1855.
41	Robinson-Herrling Sawmill	Robinson-Herrling Sawmill	December 27, 1984 (#84000685)	Old Wade House State Park; 43°46′42″N 88°05′08″W	Greenbush	Ruins of a sawmill and dam built around 1847 by Charles Robinson, bought in 1856 by Prussian immigrant Theodore Herrling, and operated until 1911. (Photo shows a reconstruction.)
42	Henry and Henriette Roth House	Henry and Henriette Roth House	April 29, 1993 (#93000337)	822 Niagara Ave. 43°45′16″N 87°42′49″W	Sheboygan	2-story brick home built in 1856 which combines elements of Greek Revival, Italianate, and other styles. Henry had immigrated from Arnstadt, Germany to work as a mason. After an injury, he focused on his Sheboygan Lime Company. After he died in 1887, his second wife Henriette from Brandenburg, Germany ran the business until 1928.
43	S and R Cheese Company	S and R Cheese Company	February 7, 2017 (#100000631)	2-18 E. Main St. 43°44′55″N 87°58′50″W	Plymouth	Brick and block factory designed by Henry Schwalberg, built in 1891, and added on to in 1912.
44	Selah Chamberlain (bulk carrier) Shipwreck	Selah Chamberlain (bulk carrier) Shipwreck	January 7, 2019 (#100003288)	2 miles NE of Sheboygan Pt. in Lake Michigan; 43°46′12″N 87°39′24″W	Sheboygan	The Selah Chamberlain was a 212-foot wooden bulk carrier built in 1873, in Cleveland, Ohio by the Quayle & Murphy shipyard. She hauled bulk cargoes such as iron ore, coal and grain between Duluth, Minnesota and Buffalo, New York. She sank in 1886 after a collision with the John Pridgeon Jr. Her wreck lies in 90 feet (27 m) of water.
45	Sheboygan County Courthouse	Sheboygan County Courthouse	March 12, 1982 (#82000713)	615 N. 6th St. 43°45′04″N 87°42′31″W	Sheboygan	7-story Moderne-style monolith built in 1933 during the Great Depression, with PWA assistance.
46	Sheboygan Falls School		July 1, 2021 (#100006692)	101 School St. 43°43′26″N 87°48′47″W	Sheboygan Falls	The original section, built in 1928, is the oldest intact school building in the town, and was designed by Oppenhamer & Obel in Collegiate Gothic style as a high school.
47	Sheboygan Municipal Auditorium and Armory	Sheboygan Municipal Auditorium and Armory	January 31, 2019 (#100003364)	516 Broughton Dr. 43°45′02″N 87°42′54″W	Sheboygan	Moderne-style public building designed by Edgar Stubenrauch and built in 1942 with help from the WPA. Housed the Sheboygan Red Skins, one of the first teams in the NBA. It was torn down in late 2020.
48	Sheboygan Post Office	Sheboygan Post Office	October 24, 2000 (#00001261)	522 N. Ninth St. 43°45′02″N 87°42′54″W	Sheboygan	Federal post office designed by Sheboygan architect Edgar Stubenrauch in simplified Neoclassical style and built in 1932, containing murals by Schomer Lichtner funded by the Treasury Relief Art Project.
49	The Sheboygan Press	The Sheboygan Press	December 14, 2020 (#100005904)	632 Center Ave. 43°45′03″N 87°42′39″W	Sheboygan	Small office building designed by Edward Juul in 20th Century Commercial style and built in 1924.
50	Sheboygan Theater	Sheboygan Theater	December 22, 1999 (#99001606)	826 N. Eighth St. 43°45′14″N 87°42′47″W	Sheboygan	1550-seat movie palace with an interior designed to suggest a night in a Spanish garden by United Studios of Chicago and built in 1927-28 for Universal Pictures Company. Now the Stefanie H. Weill Center for the Performing Arts.
51	Sheboygan Valley Land and Lime Company	Sheboygan Valley Land and Lime Company	November 2, 2016 (#16000757)	W6631 County Road MM; 43°51′18″N 88°01′39″W	Rhine	Limestone quarry and kilns for producing quicklime, constructed in 1911 and abandoned in the 1920s. A.k.a. Quasius Quarry.
52	Siebken's Resort	Siebken's Resort	December 17, 2020 (#100005907)	284 South Lake St., 285 Victorian Village Dr., and 253 South east St. 43°49′48″N 88°01′04″W	Elkhart Lake	Historic resort complex in Elkhart Lake, including the 1882 Belleview Hotel, the 1882 Opera House, the 1888 Lake Cottage, the 1921 Ice Cream Stand, and the 1925 Elm Park Hotel.
53	Silver Lake (scow-schooner) Shipwreck	Silver Lake (scow-schooner) Shipwreck	March 27, 2013 (#13000128)	7 miles (11 km) northeast of Sheboygan in Lake Michigan; 43°48′21″N 87°34′42″W	Mosel vicinity	98.5 foot scow-schooner with double centerboard, built by M.L. Johnson in Little Point Sable, Michigan, in 1889. Hauled cargo around Lake Michigan until May, 1900, when she was run down by the car ferry Pere Marquette in a heavy fog.
54	St. Patrick's Roman Catholic Church	St. Patrick's Roman Catholic Church	September 8, 1983 (#83003428)	County A 43°37′00″N 87°55′49″W	Adell	Gothic Revival-styled church with exterior of split fieldstone, built in 1877 to serve its mainly Irish-immigrant rural community.
55	David Taylor House	David Taylor House	January 2, 1976 (#76000080)	3110 Erie Ave. 43°45′10″N 87°44′52″W	Sheboygan	Cream-brick Italianate villa topped by a belvedere, built in the 1850s for David Taylor, lawyer, legislator, and prominent judge. Starting in 1905 it housed the county asylum, then workhouse. Now part of the Sheboygan County Historical Museum.
56	Third Ward School	Third Ward School	September 3, 1981 (#81000062)	1208 S. 8th St. 43°44′30″N 87°42′46″W	Sheboygan	1876 brick 2-room school in Italianate style. In 1918 it was converted to a "fresh air school" for children with tuberculosis.
57	I. C. Thomas Drug Store	I. C. Thomas Drug Store	July 10, 1974 (#74000126)	632 N. 8th St. 43°45′06″N 87°42′47″W	Sheboygan	3-story building with an arched brick entry originally used for horse-drawn vehicles, built in 1886, probably designed by A.L. Weeks, for Max Zaegel's pharmacy, which was bought by I.C. Thomas in 1920.
58	Villa Laun	Villa Laun	January 28, 1982 (#82000714)	N7821 Lake Side Park Dr. 43°49′27″N 88°01′50″W	Elkhart Lake	Fanciful Queen Anne cottage, designed by Charles Hilpertshauser of Chicago and built in 1901 for lumberman A.B. Laun as a lakeside family retreat. Address renumbered from 402.
59	Villa Von Baumbach		November 30, 1982 (#82001851)	754 Elkhart Lake Dr. 43°49′48″N 88°01′36″W	Elkhart Lake	Modest private cottage designed by Otto Strack and built for Major Charles von Baumbach in 1894 as part of the Swartz Hotel, then moved in 1908 to its current site. Includes "hunting lodge" living room and 2-story pavilion/boathouse. Von Baumbach was a German immigrant, Civil War veteran, and drug distributor.
60	Sylvanus Wade House	Sylvanus Wade House	October 26, 1971 (#71000041)	At jct. of WI 23 and Kettle Moraine Dr. in Old Wade House State Park; 43°46′36″N 88°05′06″W	Greenbush	2 1/2-story Greek Revival-styled stagecoach inn built around 1849, half-way along the Fond du Lac-Sheboygan Plank Road. The attic contains a ballroom and closet-sized rooms for the stagecoach drivers. Now a museum, with many furnishings intact.
61	Walter B. Allen (canaller) Shipwreck	Walter B. Allen (canaller) Shipwreck	November 10, 2011 (#11000811)	7 miles northeast of Sheboygan in Lake Michigan; 43°53′05″N 87°41′01″W	Mosel	2-masted schooner-rigged canaller, built in 1866 in Ogdensburg, NY, sized to just fit through the Welland Canal locks. Hauled grain east from Chicago to Buffalo or Oswego and coal west. Sank while being towed through a storm in 1880 and now sits under 175 feet of water, very intact.
62	Washington Elementary School	Washington Elementary School	February 14, 2017 (#100000680)	1238 Geele Ave. 43°46′07″N 87°43′17″W	Sheboygan	Neoclassical-styled school designed by H.C. Koch & Sons and built in 1912. Gym and classrooms were added in 1926, with more expansion in 2000.
63	Windway	Windway	July 28, 1988 (#88001149)	2311 County Road Y 43°46′11″N 87°46′40″W	Sheboygan	International-style home with a Wright-influenced floor plan, designed by William Deknatel and Geraldine Eager Deknatel and built in 1937 as the home of Walter J. Kohler, industrialist and governor of Wisconsin.
64	Wolff-Jung Company Shoe Factory	Wolff-Jung Company Shoe Factory	January 30, 1992 (#91001989)	531 S. Eighth St. 43°44′56″N 87°42′44″W	Sheboygan	3.5-story Romanesque Revival-styled shoe factory built in 1885 by builder Jacob Jung and sons for a partnership with leather tanner Theodore Zchetzche and shoe manufacturer and retailer Charles Wolff. Expanded in 1889. Later housed the Sellinger Glove Company.

== See also ==
- List of National Historic Landmarks in Wisconsin
- National Register of Historic Places listings in Wisconsin
- Listings in neighboring counties: Calumet, Fond du Lac, Manitowoc, Ozaukee, Washington
