= Wade House Historic Site =

Museum and State Historical Site in Sheboygan County, Wisconsin

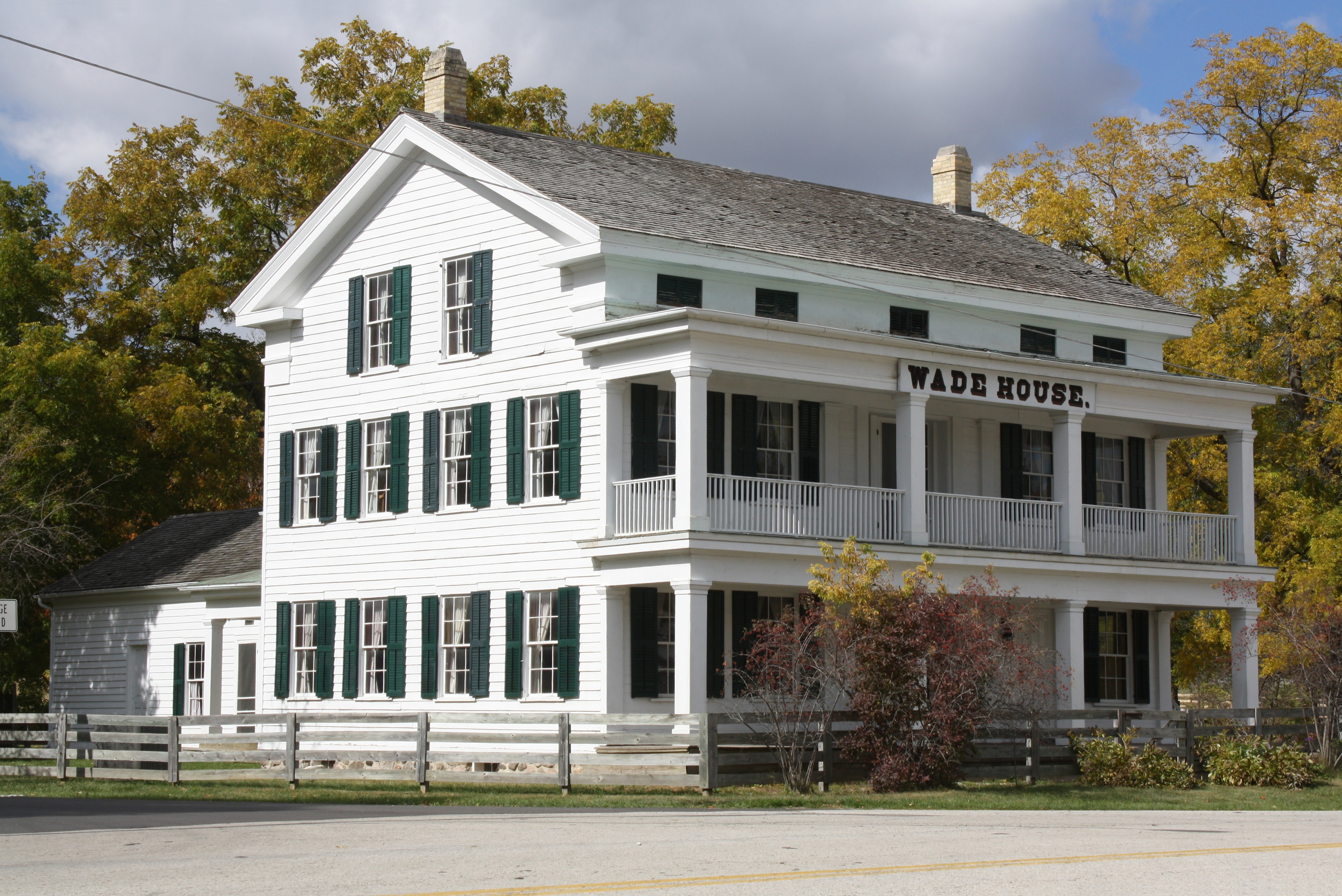
- Old Wade House

- Location within Wisconsin Location within the United States
- Location: Sheboygan, Wisconsin, United States
- Coordinates: 43°46′36″N 88°05′05″W
- Area: 48 acres (19 ha)
- Established: 1953
- Governing body: Wisconsin Historical Society
- Website: wadehouse.wisconsinhistory.org

Wade House Historical Site, also called Old Wade House, is a 240-acre (97 ha) open-air museum in Greenbush, Wisconsin. A Wisconsin historic site, the site is operated by the Wisconsin Historical Society.

The site contains nine major structures, three of which are listed in the National Register of Historic Places.

The namesake structure is the Sylvanus Wade House constructed in 1848–1849.

Live historic interpreters wearing period-style clothing populate the park during summer operations.

== History ==
The Wade house was restored in 1950–1953 by the Kohler Foundation and then turned over to the state to be operated as a state park.

The Wesley W. Jung Carriage Museum was constructed and opened to the public in 1968. The museum features a collection of horse-drawn and hand-drawn vehicles, including carriages, sleighs, wagons, fire wagons and more.

The Robinson-Herrling sawmill site and 97 acres of property were purchased in 1960. was reconstructed on its original site from 1999 to 2001.

A new 30,000-square-foot (2,800 m^{2}) visitor center and carriage museum was opened in 2013.

== List of structures ==
Three of the site's structures are listed on the National Register of Historic Places.

| Structure name | location | Image | Built | Construction/style/notes |
|---|---|---|---|---|
| Sylvanus Wade House | 43.776694°N 88.084779°W | | 1849 | Greek Revival; Listed on the NRHP in 1971 (#71000041) |
| Charles Robinson House | 43.776089°N 88.086371°W | | 1855 | Greek Revival; Listed on the NRHP in 1984 (#84000678); Also known as the Butternut House; was residences of Sylvanus Wade's oldest daughter and her husband. |
| Robinson Carriage House | 43.776138°N 88.086653°W | | | |
| Butternut Cafe | 43.776432°N 88.085858°W | | 1950 | Astylistic Utilitarian Building |
| Robinson-Herrling Sawmill Farmhouse | 43.777908°N 88.085542°W | | 1847 | Timber frame Listed on the NRHP in 1984 (#84000685); Rebuilt at original site 1999–2001 |
| Dockstader Blacksmith Shop | 43.777588°N 88.085014°W | | 1970s | |
| Smokehouse | 43.776842°N 88.084957°W | | | |
| Interpretation Building | 43.777462°N 88.087148°W | | 1950s | This building was previously used as the visitors center but was re-purposed after construction of the new visitors center building in 2013. |
| Visitor Center | 43.781824°N 88.087509°W | | 2013 | |
| Wesley W. Jung Carriage Museum | 43.781707°N 88.087221°W | | 2013 | Over 70 horse-drawn and hand-drawn vehicles, including carriages, sleighs, wagons, fire wagons and more. |
| Carriage Pavilion | 43.778981°N 88.090407°W | | 1967–1968 | This building was previously used as the carriage museum but was re-purposed after construction of the new visitors center building in 2013. |
| Chicken Coop | 43.776885°N 88.085248°W | | | |
| Sheep Pen | 43.777252°N 88.085787°W | | | |
| Stable | 43.777961°N 88.087207°W | | | |
| Maintenance Building | 43.779205°N 88.091652°W | | | |

== See also ==
National Register of Historic Places listings in Sheboygan County, Wisconsin
