= Greenbush (CDP), Wisconsin =

Census-designated place in Wisconsin, United States

Greenbush, Wisconsin
- Census-designated place
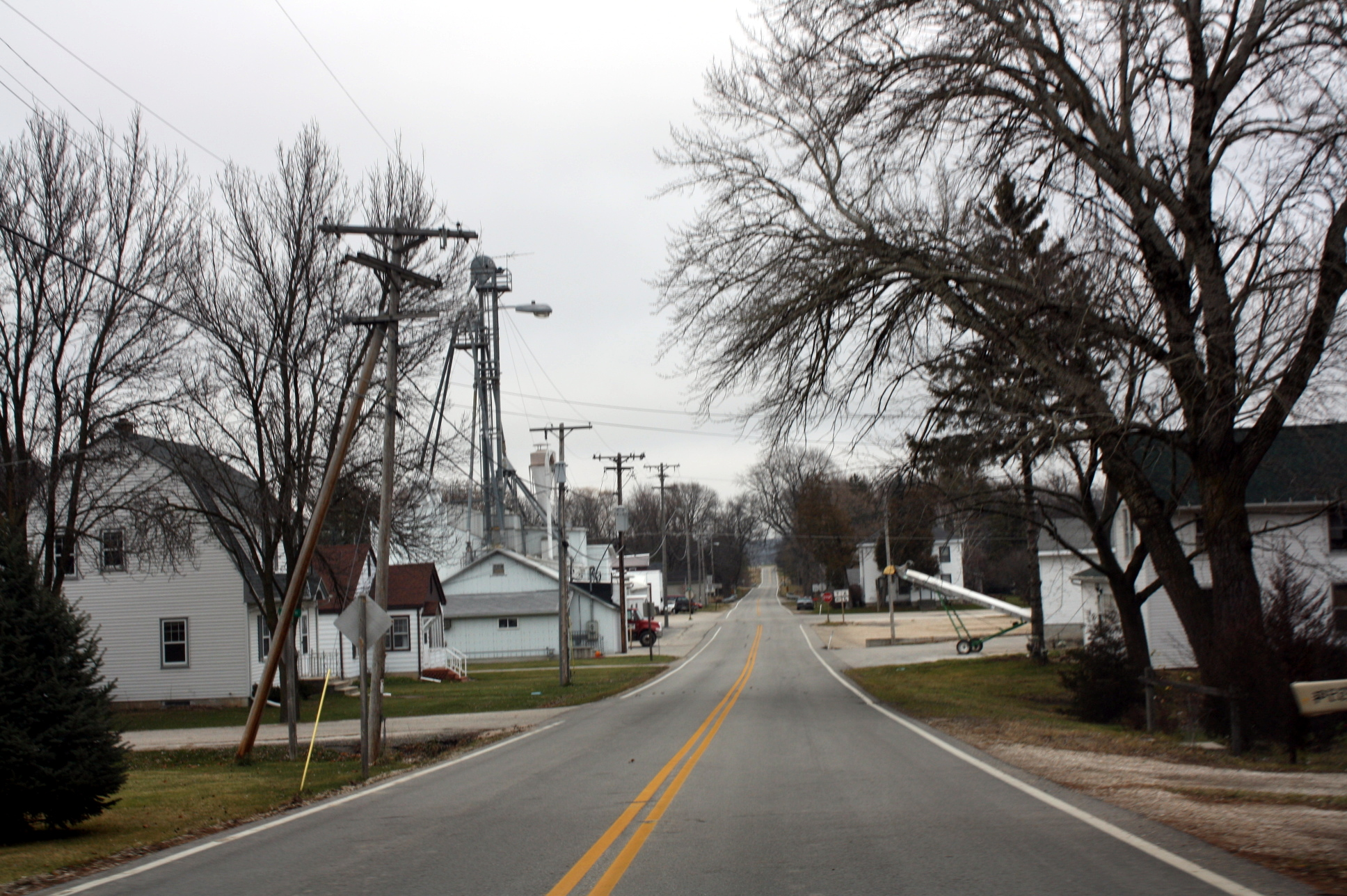
- Downtown Greenbush

- Location within Wisconsin
- Coordinates: 43°46′36″N 88°05′02″W
- Country: United States
- State: Wisconsin
- County: Sheboygan

Area
  - Total: 0.687 sq mi (1.78 km^{2})
  - Land: 0.685 sq mi (1.77 km^{2})
  - Water: 0.002 sq mi (0.0052 km^{2})
- Elevation: 971 ft (296 m)

Population (2020 census)
  - Total: 159
  - Density: 232/sq mi (89.6/km^{2})
- Time zone: UTC-6 (Central (CST))
  - Summer (DST): UTC-5 (CDT)
- ZIP code: 53026
- Area code: 920
- GNIS feature ID: 1565833

Greenbush is a census-designated place located in the town of Greenbush, Sheboygan County, Wisconsin, United States.

== Description ==
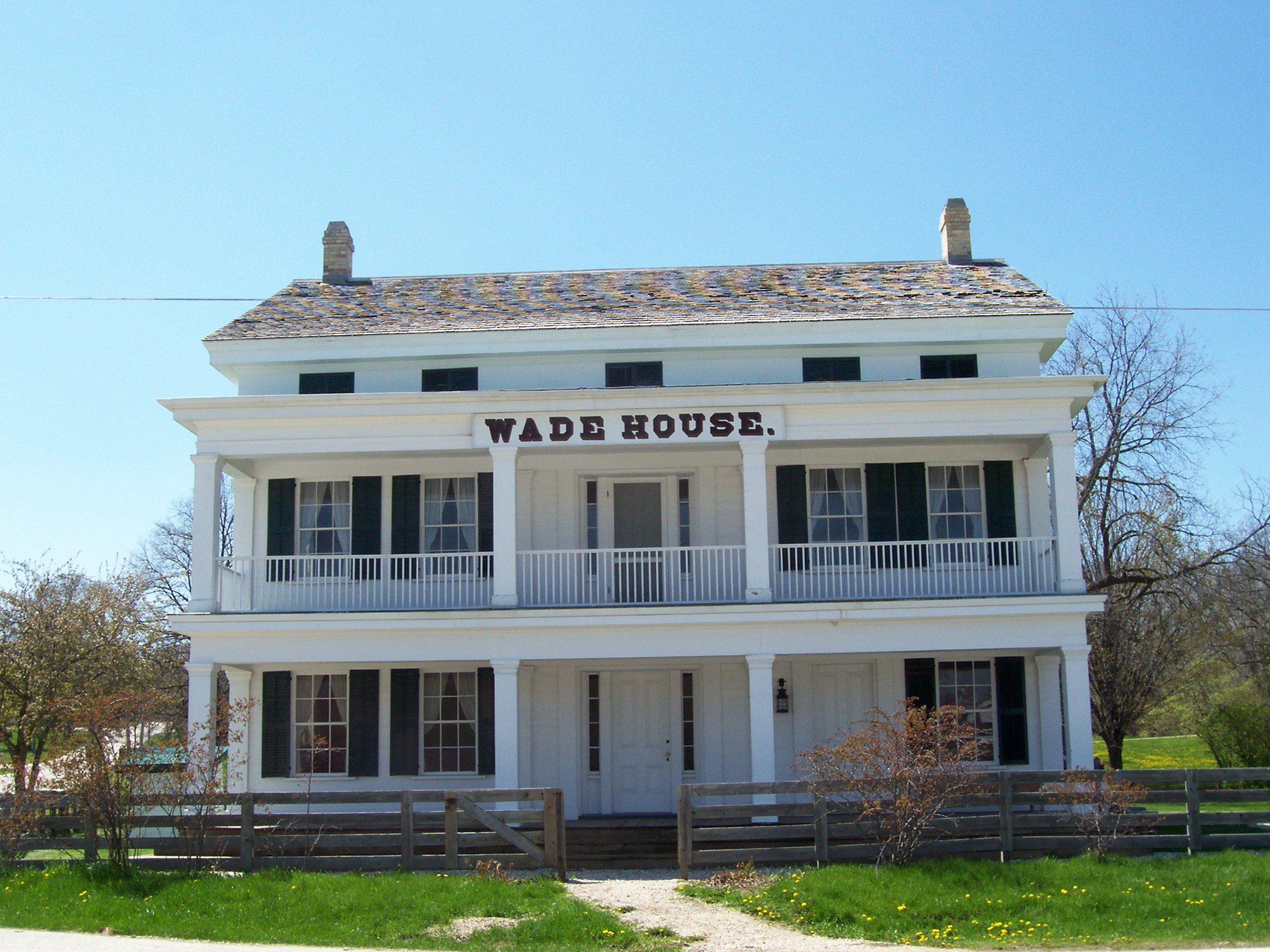
Sylvanus Wade House

Greenbush is located near Wisconsin Highway 23, 5.5 miles (8.9 km) west-northwest of Plymouth. Greenbush has a post office with ZIP code 53026. As of the 2010 census, its population was 162. The Sylvanus Wade House is located in Greenbush.

== Demographics ==
Greenbush first appeared as a census designated place in the 2010 U.S. census.

=== 2020 census ===
Greenbush CDP, Wisconsin – Racial and ethnic composition Note: the US Census treats Hispanic/Latino as an ethnic category. This table excludes Latinos from the racial categories and assigns them to a separate category. Hispanics/Latinos may be of any race.
Race / Ethnicity (NH = Non-Hispanic)	Pop 2010	Pop 2020	% 2010	% 2020
White alone (NH)	162	145	100.00%	91.19%
Black or African American alone (NH)	0	0	0.00%	0.00%
Native American or Alaska Native alone (NH)	0	1	0.00%	0.63%
Asian alone (NH)	0	0	0.00%	0.00%
Pacific Islander alone (NH)	0	0	0.00%	0.00%
Other race alone (NH)	0	0	0.00%	0.00%
Mixed race or Multiracial (NH)	0	7	0.00%	4.40%
Hispanic or Latino (any race)	0	6	0.00%	3.77%
Total	162	159	100.00%	100.00%

== See also ==
- List of census-designated places in Wisconsin
