= Wolff-Jung Company Shoe Factory =

- Wolff--Jung Company Shoe Factory
- U.S. National Register of Historic Places
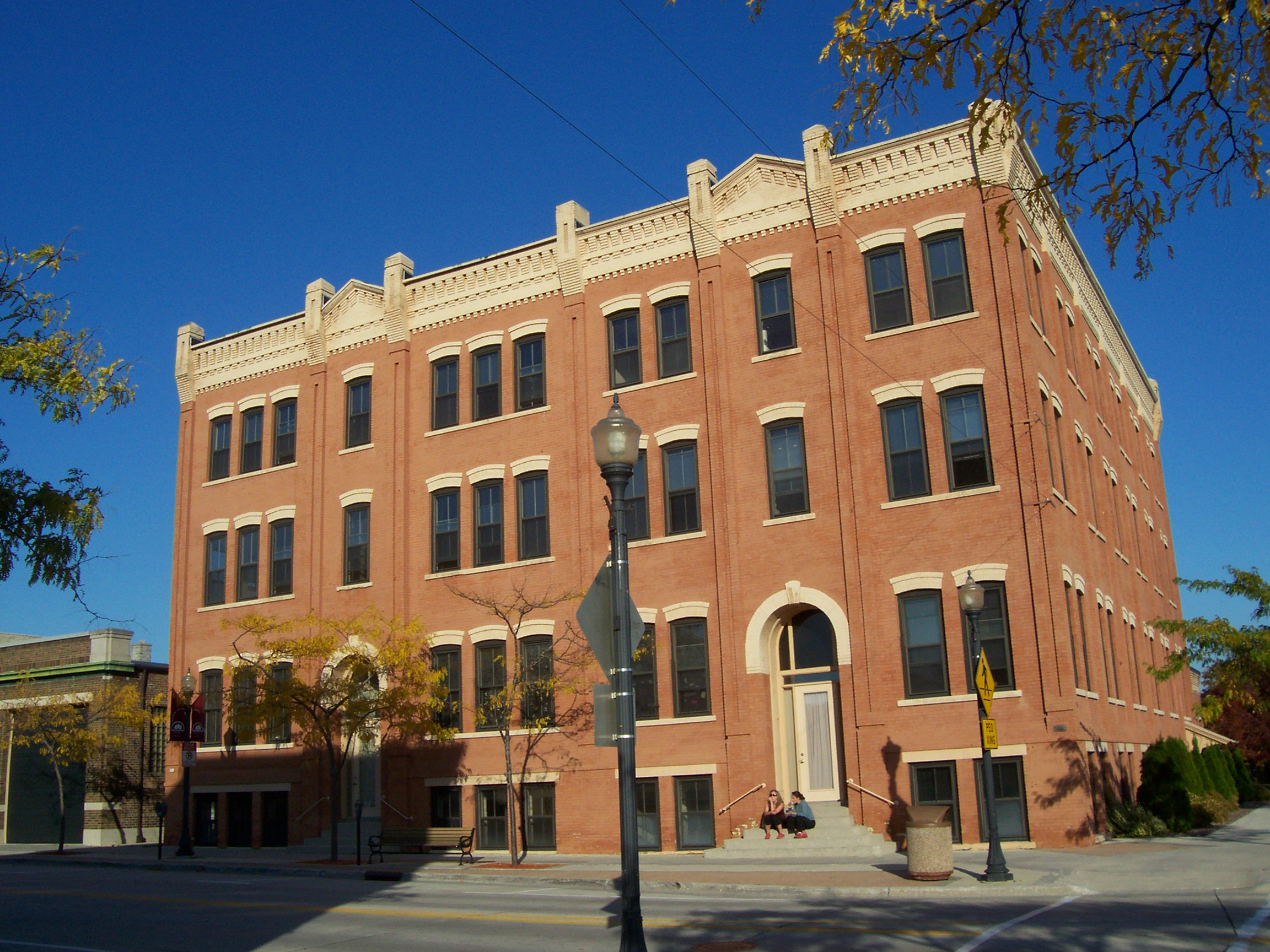
- The building in 2008

- Location within Wisconsin
- Location: 531 South Eighth Street, Sheboygan, Wisconsin
- Coordinates: 43°44′56″N 87°42′44″W
- Area: less than one acre
- Built: 1885
- Built by: Jacob Jung
- Architectural style: Italianate
- NRHP reference No.: 91001989
- Added to NRHP: January 30, 1992

The Wolff-Jung Company Shoe Factory is a historic three-story building in Sheboygan, Wisconsin. It was designed in the Italianate style, and built in 1885 for businessmen Theodore Zscnetzsche, Jacob Jung, and Charles Wolff. It has been listed on the National Register of Historic Places since January 30, 1992.
