= Jung Carriage Factory =

- U.S. National Register of Historic Places
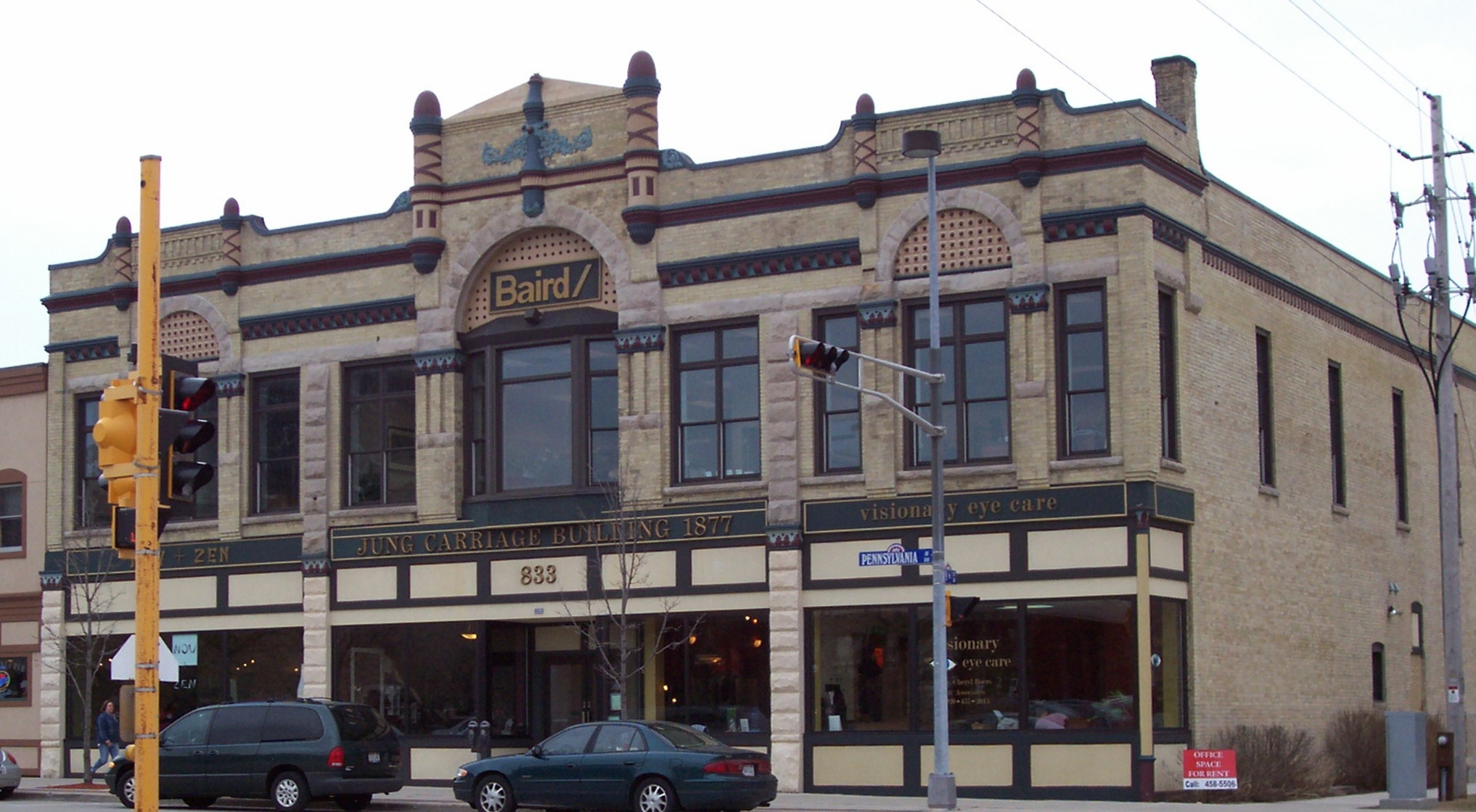
- The building in 2008

- Location within Wisconsin
- Location: 829-835 Pennsylvania Avenue, Sheboygan, Wisconsin
- Coordinates: 43°44′59″N 87°42′52″W
- Area: less than one acre
- Built: 1885
- Architectural style: Richardsonian Romanesque
- NRHP reference No.: 74000125
- Added to NRHP: July 10, 1974

The Jung Carriage Factory is a historic two-story building in Sheboygan, Wisconsin. It was built in 1885 for Jacob Jung, and designed in the Richardsonian Romanesque style. The building was initially a factory of "horsedrawn carriages, wagons, and sleighs." It has been listed on the National Register of Historic Places since July 10, 1974.
