= Robert C. Pringle =

Wooden-hulled American tugboat lost on Lake Michigan

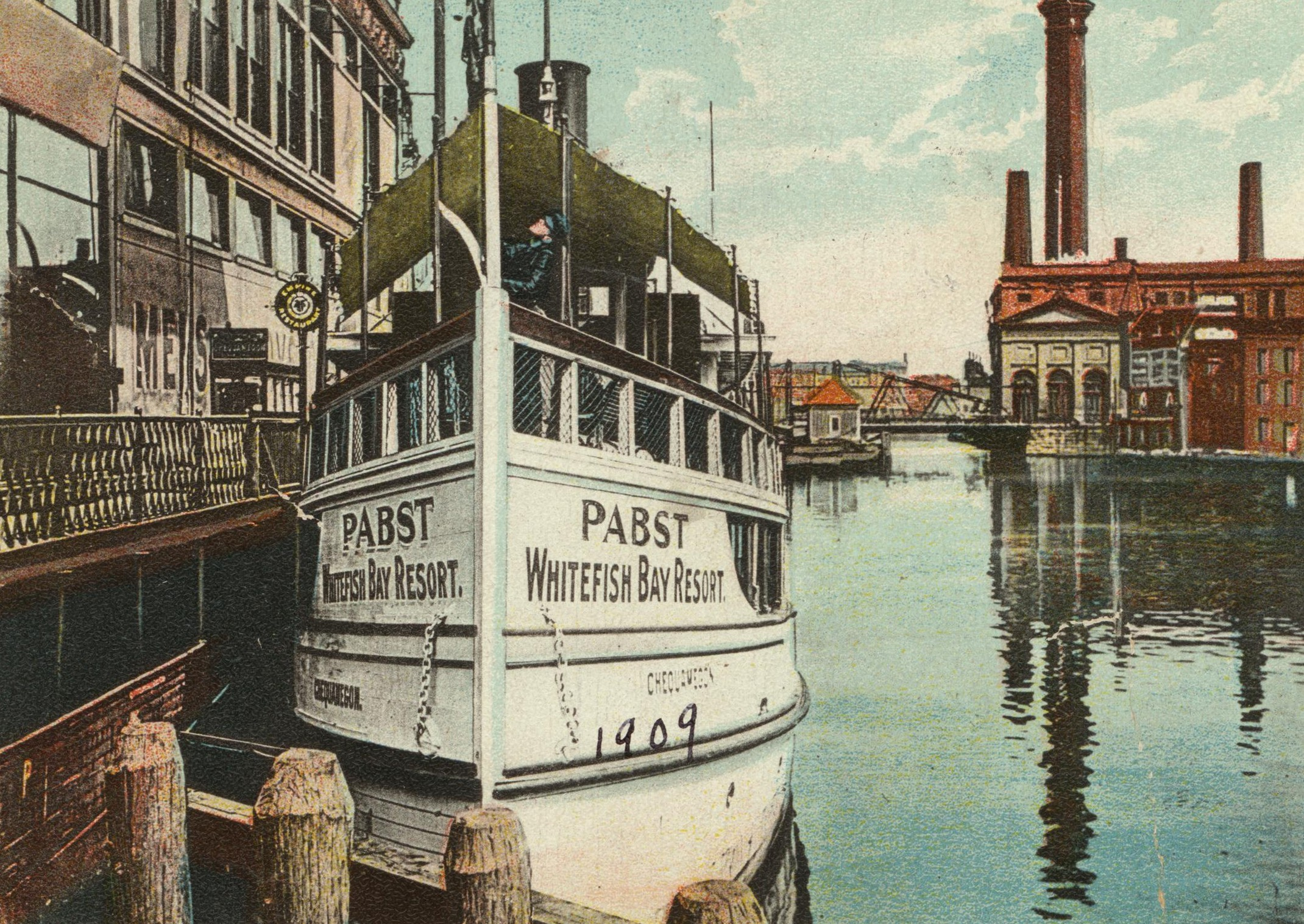
- Robert C. Pringle as Chequamegon, c. 1909

History

United States
- Name: Robert C. Pringle
- Operator: Pringle Barge Line Company, Mentor, Ohio
- Port of registry: Fairport, Ohio
- Builder: Manitowoc Shipbuilding & Dry Dock Company, Manitowoc, Wisconsin
- Yard number: 1
- Launched: May 9, 1903
- In service: June 23, 1903
- Out of service: June 19, 1922
- Identification: Registry number US 127764
- Fate: Sank after striking an obstruction

General characteristics
- Class & type: Tugboat
- Tonnage: 141 GRT; 112 NRT
- Length: 101 ft (30.8 m)
- Beam: 22.33 ft (6.8 m)
- Depth: 9.50 ft (2.9 m)
- Installed power: Engine: 500 hp (370 kW) rpm triple expansion steam engine; Boiler: 175 psi (1,210 kPa) Scotch marine boiler
- Propulsion: 1 × 7.5 ft (2.3 m) fixed pitch propeller
National Register of Historic Places data
Robert C. Pringle (tug) Shipwreck
U.S. National Register of Historic Places
Location within Wisconsin
Location	8 miles (13 km) southeast of Sheboygan, Wisconsin
Coordinates	43°41′30″N 87°33′18″W
Built	1903
Architect	Manitowoc Shipbuilding & Dry Dock Company
NRHP reference No.	100005902
Added to NRHP	December 14, 2020

Robert C. Pringle, originally named Chequamegon, was a wooden-hulled American tugboat. She sank without loss of life on Lake Michigan, near Sheboygan, Wisconsin, on June 19, 1922, after striking an obstruction, possibly floating driftwood.

Chequamegon was built in 1903 in Manitowoc, Wisconsin, by the Manitowoc Shipbuilding & Dry Dock Company. She was built for the newly formed Chequamegon Bay Transportation Company of Ashland, Wisconsin, under which she hauled freight between Ashland, Bayfield, Washburn and Madeline Island. She was sold multiple times between 1904 and 1918, and was renamed Pere Marquette 7 in 1911. In 1918, she was sold to the Pringle Barge Line, who converted her to a tug and renamed her Robert C. Pringle.

On June 18, 1922, Robert C. Pringle began towing the wooden bulk freighter Venezuela from Milwaukee to Sandusky, Ohio, where the Venezuela was scheduled to receive extensive repairs. At about 2:00 a.m. on the following day, as the vessels were passing Sheboygan, Robert C. Pringle struck an obstruction, and began taking on water rapidly. Despite her pumps being in operation, the water eventually extinguished her boilers, forcing her crew to abandon her and row to Venezuela. All crewmen were delivered safely to Manitowoc.

Robert C. Pringle's wreck was discovered in 2008 by Steve Radovan. In 2019, it was subjected to a thorough archaeological survey by the Wisconsin Historical Society, which described the wreck as "remarkably intact". The wreck of Robert C. Pringle was listed on the National Register of Historic Places on December 14, 2020.

== History ==
=== Design and construction ===
Robert C. Pringle (Official number 127764) was built as Chequamegon in 1903 by the Manitowoc Shipbuilding & Dry Dock Company on the banks of the Manitowoc River in Manitowoc, Wisconsin. The first vessel built by the newly established shipyard, she was launched at 3:06 p.m. on May 9, 1903, as hull number 1. Chequamegon's wooden hull was 101 feet (30.8 m) in length, 22.33 or 22.4 feet (6.81 or 6.83 m) wide, and 9.50 or 9.6 feet (2.90 or 2.93 m) deep. She had a gross register tonnage of 141 tons, and a net register tonnage of 112 tons.

Chequamegon was powered by a 500-horsepower (370 kW) 145 or 200 rpm triple expansion steam engine, the cylinders of which had bores of 12 inches (30.5 cm), 19 inches (48.3 cm) and 32 inches (81.3 cm), and a stroke of 20 inches (50.8 cm). A single 10.5-by-11-foot (3.2 by 3.4 m) Scotch marine boiler, rated 175 pounds per square inch (1,210 kPa) supplied the engine with steam. The engine was manufactured in Montague, Michigan, by the Montague Iron Works, and her boiler was manufactured in Ferrysburg, Michigan, by the Johnson Brothers Company. A 7.5-foot (2.3 m) fixed-pitch propeller propelled her to a top speed of 18 miles per hour (15.6 kn; 29.0 km/h).

Chequamegon had two decks, no mast, and a round stern. At great expense, her cabins were fitted out with oak woodwork and upholstered furniture. She was capable of accommodating 500 people.

=== Service history ===
Chequamegon was built for the Chequamegon Bay Transportation Company of Ashland, Wisconsin, who intended to use her as an excursion vessel between Ashland, Bayfield, Washburn and Madeline Island, all in Wisconsin. She was issued a temporary enrollment on June 13, 1903, in Milwaukee, Wisconsin, and a permanent enrollment on June 23 at Marquette, Michigan. In the middle of September, her trips to Madeline Island were discontinued, and she was moved to Duluth, Minnesota, where she was fitted with a new propeller to improve her speed. She made excursions around the Apostle Islands on September 26 and 27, and October 10 and 11.

Scheduled to be moved to Milwaukee in 1904, she made her final trip on May 21, 1904, between Ashland and Washburn, arriving in Milwaukee the day after her final trip. That June, Chequamegon began transporting passengers from Milwaukee to Pabst's Whitefish Bay Resort. She was chartered by the Benton Transit Company of Benton Harbor, Michigan, in August 1904, and had bulwarks fitted to her lower deck. During this time, she ran between Benton Harbor and Milwaukee. Chequamegon's propeller was damaged on September 12, 1904, while she was inbound for Milwaukee. When Louis A. Cartier, president of the Chequamegon Bay Transportation Company, moved to Ludington, Michigan, she briefly hauled fruit towards the end of the shipping season, from Benton Harbor and St. Joseph, Michigan, to Milwaukee. Chequamegon resumed her trips for Pabst's Whitefish Bay Resort, briefly engaging in the fruit trade in September 1906.

On April 22, 1907, Chequamegon was sold to R. Floyd Clinch of Chicago, Illinois; her home port was changed to Chicago. Chequamegon was transferred to Clinch's Traverse Bay Transportation Company in 1908. That year, she was taken to Sturgeon Bay, Wisconsin, where she received a new 9.5-foot (2.9 m) propeller, built by H.G. Trout & Company of Buffalo, New York. After receiving some additional repairs, she returned to her Charlevoix, Michigan – Traverse City, Michigan route. On August 18, 1909, Chequamegon's cook, Sanford M. Silver, drowned after falling overboard.

Chequamegon was sold to the Pere Marquette Line of Steamers in 1911, and was renamed Pere Marquette 7 on January 30. She ran between Chicago, Waukegan, Illinois, Milwaukee, Kenosha, Wisconsin and Port Washington, Wisconsin, carrying freight. In April 1914, Pere Marquette 7 was overhauled and repainted in Sturgeon Bay.

In 1918, Pere Marquette 7 was sold to the Pringle Barge Line Company of Mentor, Ohio, and was renamed Robert C. Pringle. She was converted to a tugboat in Sandusky, Ohio, to tow barges in the Lake Erie coal trade, and had her home port changed to Fairport, Ohio. She briefly bore the name Henry R. Heath between 1919 and 1920.

=== Final voyage ===
The Pringle Barge Line Company acquired the wooden bulk freighter Venezuela in 1922. As Venezuela required significant repairs, Robert C. Pringle was dispatched to Milwaukee, Wisconsin, to tow her to Sandusky, Ohio, where the repairs were to be performed. The vessels departed Milwaukee at around midnight on June 18, with Robert C. Pringle under the command of Captain Martin Oglesbee. At around 2:00 a.m. the following day, as Robert C. Pringle and Venezuela were passing Sheboygan, Wisconsin, Robert C. Pringle struck an obstruction, possibly floating driftwood, and began taking on water rapidly. She sank in ten minutes, with all her crew being rescued by Venezuela, which dropped her crew off in Milwaukee. Venezuela proceeded to Sandusky under her own steam.

After she sank, there was speculation that Robert C. Pringle's loss occurred as a result of a weakness in her hull due to advanced age.

== Wreck ==
Robert C. Pringle's wreck was discovered in 300 feet (91.4 m) of water by Steve Radovan in 2008. Radovan had been searching for her since the 1970s, locating the wrecks of the schooners Floretta and Home in the process. Her wreck is upright and was described by the Wisconsin Historical Society as "remarkably intact on a sand and silt covered lake bottom, with little damage or deterioration". Her pilothouse, including the glass in four of its windows, remains in place. The captain's cabin, located behind the pilothouse is also intact. Robert C. Pringle's triple expansion engine still retains gold lettering. In 2019, maritime archaeologists from the Wisconsin Historical Society partnered with Tom Crossmon's Crossmon Consulting LLC to conduct a thorough archaeological survey of the wreck.

The wreck was listed on the National Register of Historic Places on December 14, 2020.

== Sources ==
- Alpena County George N. Fletcher Public Library (2020). "Chequamegon (1903, Excursion Vessel)". Alpena, Michigan: Alpena County George N. Fletcher Public Library.
- Alpena County George N. Fletcher Public Library (2021). "Hunter (1877, Propeller)". Alpena, Michigan: Alpena County George N. Fletcher Public Library.
- Bowling Green State University (2010). "Chequamegon". Bowling Green, Ohio: Bowling Green State University.
- La Crosse Tribune (2008). "Divers find shipwreck in Lake Michigan off Sheboygan coast". La Crosse, Wisconsin: La Crosse Tribune. Archived from the original on January 19, 2021.
- National Park Service (2020). "Weekly List – December 18, 2020" (PDF). Washington D.C.: National Park Service.
- Pioneer Press (2008). "Divers find shipwreck in Lake Michigan off Sheboygan coast". Saint Paul, Minnesota: St. Paul Pioneer Press.
- The Associated Press (2008). "Sheboygan, Wis. / Group finds shipwreck". Saint Paul, Minnesota: St. Paul Pioneer Press.
- Wisconsin Historical Society (2020). "Significance Through Obscurity: An Agglomeration of Wisconsin's Submerged Archaeological Sites" (PDF). Madison, Wisconsin: Wisconsin Historical Society.
- Wisconsin Shipwrecks (2021). "Robert C. Pringle (1903)". Wisconsin Shipwrecks. Madison, Wisconsin: Wisconsin Historical Society.
- Wisconsin State Journal (1922). "Ten Men Rescued From Lake Craft". Madison, Wisconsin: Wisconsin State Journal – via Newspapers.com.
