= I. C. Thomas Drug Store =

- Thomas, I. C., Drug Store
- U.S. National Register of Historic Places
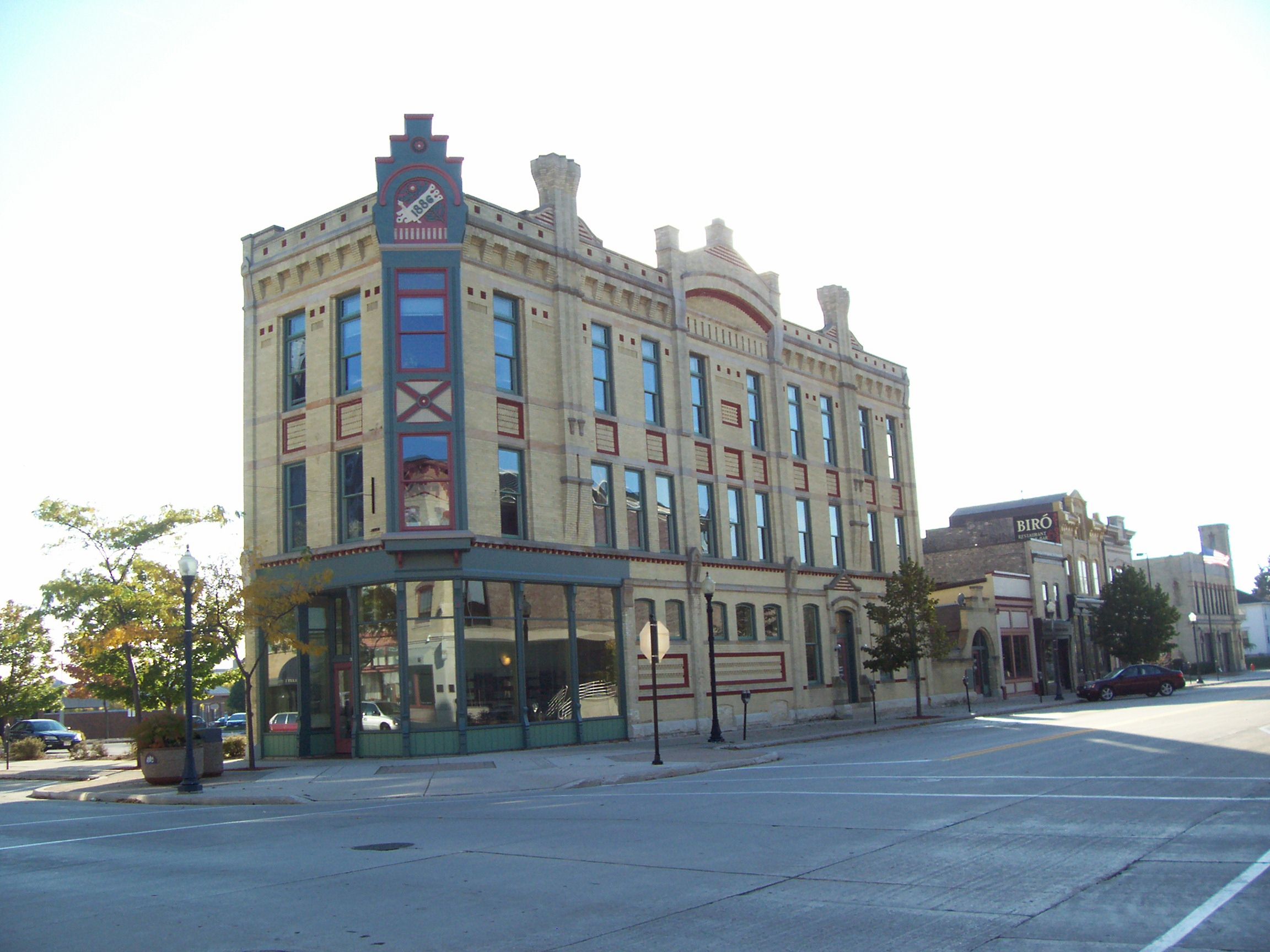
- The building in 2008

- Location within Wisconsin
- Location: 632 North 8th Street, Sheboygan, Wisconsin
- Coordinates: 43°45′06″N 87°42′47″W
- Area: less than one acre
- Built: 1886
- Architect: Arvin L. Weeks
- NRHP reference No.: 74000126
- Added to NRHP: July 10, 1974

The I. C. Thomas Drug Store is a historic three-story building in Sheboygan, Wisconsin. It was designed by architect Arvin L. Weeks, and built as a drugstore for Max R. Zaegel in 1886. From 1920 to 1971, it belonged to I. C. Thomas, another pharmacist. The building has been listed on the National Register of Historic Places since July 10, 1974.
