= Quasius Quarry =

- Sheboygan Valley Land and Lime Company
- U.S. National Register of Historic Places
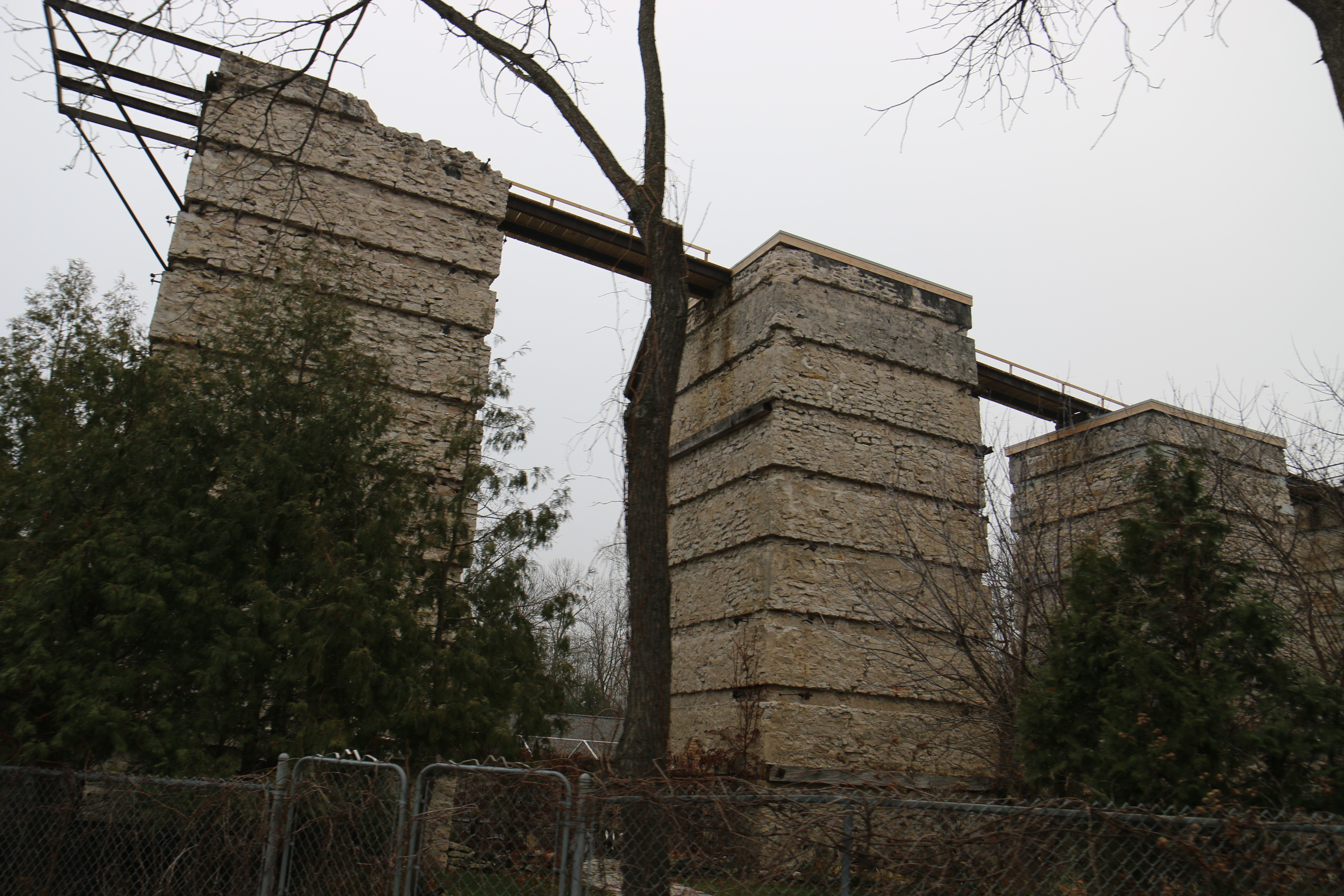

- Location within Wisconsin Location within the United States
- Location: W6631 County Road MM, Elkhart Lake, Wisconsin
- Coordinates: 43°51′17.5″N 88°1′43.5″W
- NRHP reference No.: 16000757
- Added to NRHP: November 2, 2016

Quasius Quarry is a historic site near the Sheboygan River in Elkhart Lake, Wisconsin. It is listed on the National Register of Historic Places as the Sheboygan Valley Land and Lime Company. It includes a limestone quarry and kilns for producing quicklime, constructed in 1911 and abandoned in the 1920s.

== See also ==
- National Register of Historic Places listings in Sheboygan County, Wisconsin

Quasius Quarry.com
