= Sylvanus Wade House =

Historic house in Wisconsin, United States

- U.S. National Register of Historic Places
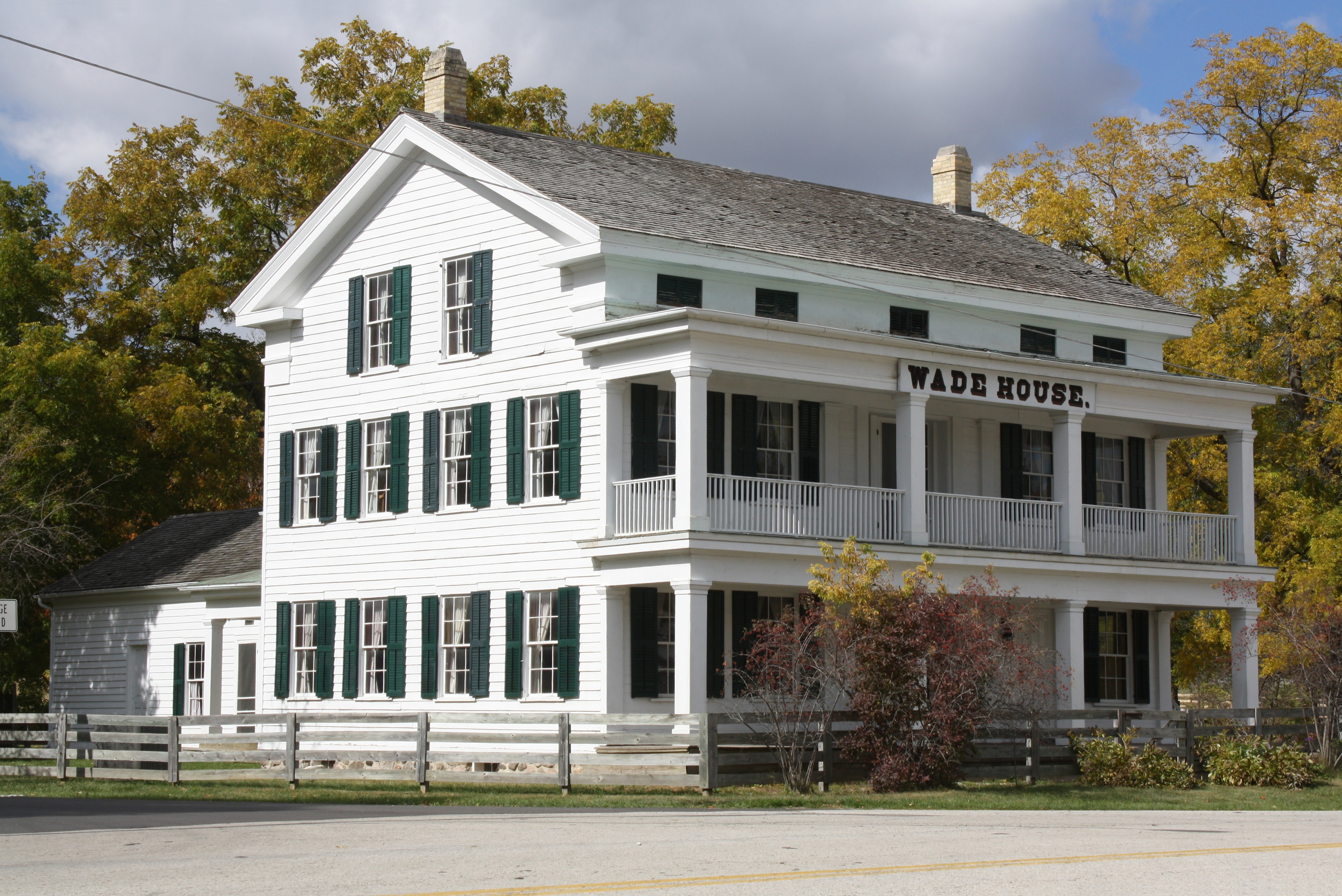
- Wade House in 2012

- Location within Wisconsin Location within the United States
- Location: Kettle Moraine Scenic Drive, Greenbush, Wisconsin
- Nearest city: Plymouth, Wisconsin
- Coordinates: 43°46′45″N 88°05′33″W
- Area: 0.4 acres (0.16 ha)
- Built: 1849
- Architect: Charles Robinson
- Architectural style: Greek Revival
- NRHP reference No.: 71000041
- Added to NRHP: October 26, 1971

The Sylvanus Wade House is a former stagecoach inn located in Greenbush, Wisconsin, United States. The house provided lodging and meals to travelers in the mid-1800s, before the construction of a nearby railroad made the stagecoach route obsolete. Today, it is part of the Wade House Historic Site.

== Early years ==
In 1844, Sylvanus Wade moved his family to the Greenbush area, where he purchased several hundred acres of land with the intent of building a town. The first dwelling they built was a log home that was repeatedly enlarged as the family grew and the number of visitors increased.

A three-story wooden Greek Revival house was built between 1848 and 1851. (Note: The obituary of Sylvanus Wade's daughter in-law, Althea Stannard-Wade, in 1919 states that the house was built in 1850, as do all subsequent published histories, but printed advertisements with a drawing depicting the house date at least to 1849.) It quickly gained attention for its large size and stylish appearance. Wade began advertising his "Half Way House" in Sheboygan in 1849. This, coupled with the inn's location halfway between the larger cities of Fond du Lac and Sheboygan, Wisconsin on the Fond du Lac-Sheboygan Plank Road, made it a popular stopover for travelers during the 1850s and 1860s. However, when travel by horse and stagecoach became obsolete and the railroad between Sheboygan and Fond du Lac went through Glenbeulah to the north, the house's full-time use as an inn was discontinued. Ironically, a railroad directors election meeting was held at the house in 1854.

== Post-railroad era ==
The family continued to host personal guests at the house in the following decades, and hosted events such as business meetings, socials, wedding anniversaries, and showers. By 1917 the house was being referred to as the historic old "Wade House".

The house was owned by Hollis Wade until his death in 1921, at which time ownership passed to his son William. A domestic argument at the house in 1927 ended with William accidentally shooting his son-in-law, Fred Limberg, in the leg.

In 1939 an effort was made to turn the Wade House into a going business, with advertising noting its availability for private events and dinners.

Ownership of the house passed out of the family in 1941 when it was sold to Mr. and Mrs. M. J. Dorst of Freeport, Illinois, with the new owners announcing their intent to restore it to 1850s condition. Martin Dorst was a native of nearby Plymouth. and Mary Dorst was a friend of the Wades from childhood. William Wade died in 1943 at the age of 71.

Frequent mention of the house in the society columns of The Sheboygan Press throughout the 1940s indicates that it continued to be a popular destination. Even as late as June 1950 rooms were being rented out. The Methodist church of Greenbush used the Wade House for church services for a two-year period from 1944 to 1946.

Attempts to operate a business were made in 1949 when Mrs. Martin Dorst's son, Clare Dorst, announced that he would be operating a restaurant in the house.

== Restoration ==
The first mention of selling the property to the State Historical Society of Wisconsin was in April 1948 when Mrs. Martin Dorst offered it to the society. In December 1949 she announced that she was putting the house up for sale to any buyer because of the large expense that would be required to meet modern health codes for restaurants. In February 1950, the state conservation commission proposed purchasing the house to use as an office and visitors' center for the Kettle Moraine State Forest.

The sale of the house did not occur until July 1950 when it was purchased, along with all furnishings, by the Kohler Foundation for $17,000 with the intention of donating it to the historical society after the restoration work was completed.

From 1950 to 1953, the Wade House was restored to its Civil War–era appearance by the Kohler Foundation with the effort spearhead by Ruth Miriam DeYoung-Kohler, wife of Herbert Kohler. Mrs. Kohler intended the restoration as a memorial to her husband's sister, Marie Christine Kohler, who had become interested it the Wade house before her death in 1943. Ruth Kohler died on March 7, 1953, at the age of 46 and was not able to witness the turning over of the house to the state three months later.

The historic building was deeded to the State Historical Society of Wisconsin (now Wisconsin Historical Society) in 1953 in a ceremony that featured poet and Lincoln biographer Carl Sandburg.

== Modern historic site ==
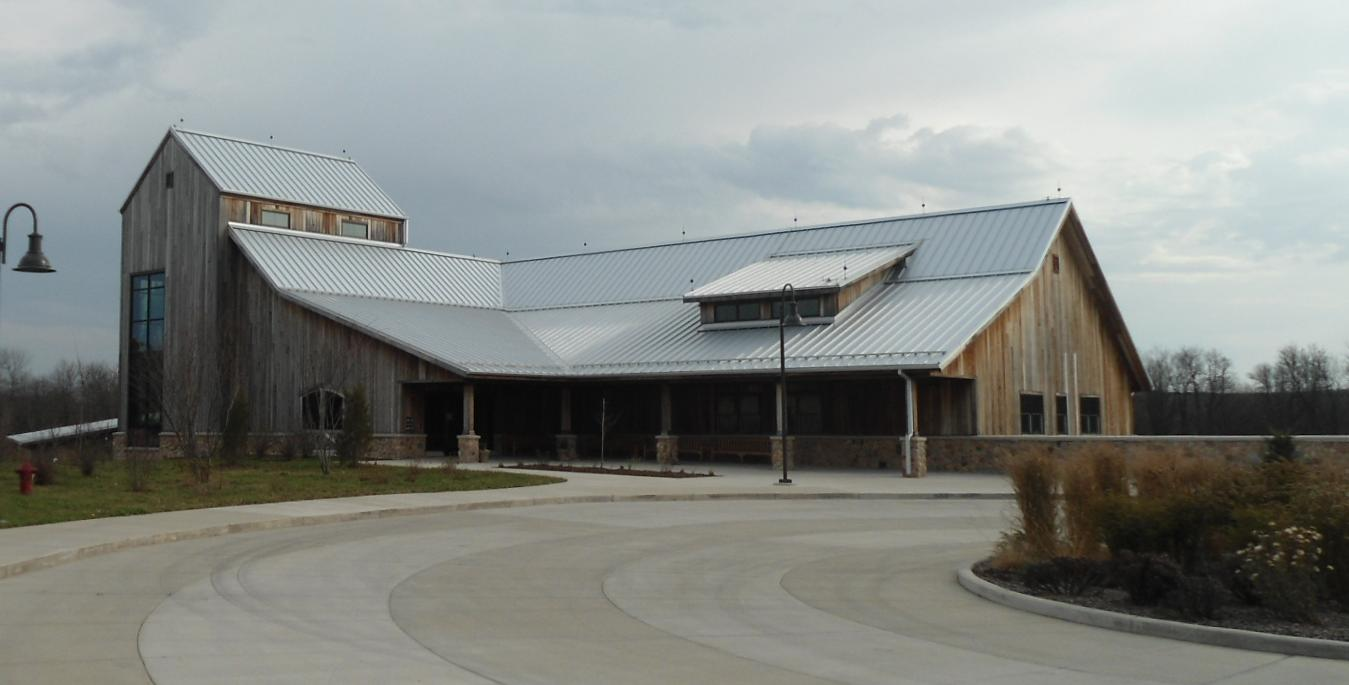
Visitor center

Today the inn, which is listed on the National Register of Historic Places, is part of the Wade House Historic Site, a historical museum operated by the Wisconsin Historical Society. The site includes two other buildings on the National Register, the Charles Robinson House and the Robinson-Herrling Sawmill. The historical society also operates the Wesley Jung Carriage Museum at the site, exhibiting a large collection of 19th-century American horse-drawn vehicles.

The house was located on the main line Wisconsin Highway 23 until the highway was rerouted to bypass north of Greenbush in the mid-1980s. The Wade house was formerly a part of the Wisconsin state park system as the Old Wade House State Park, before coming under the direct purview of the Wisconsin Historical Society.
