= Sheboygan Indian Mound Park =

- Kletzien Mound Group
- U.S. National Register of Historic Places
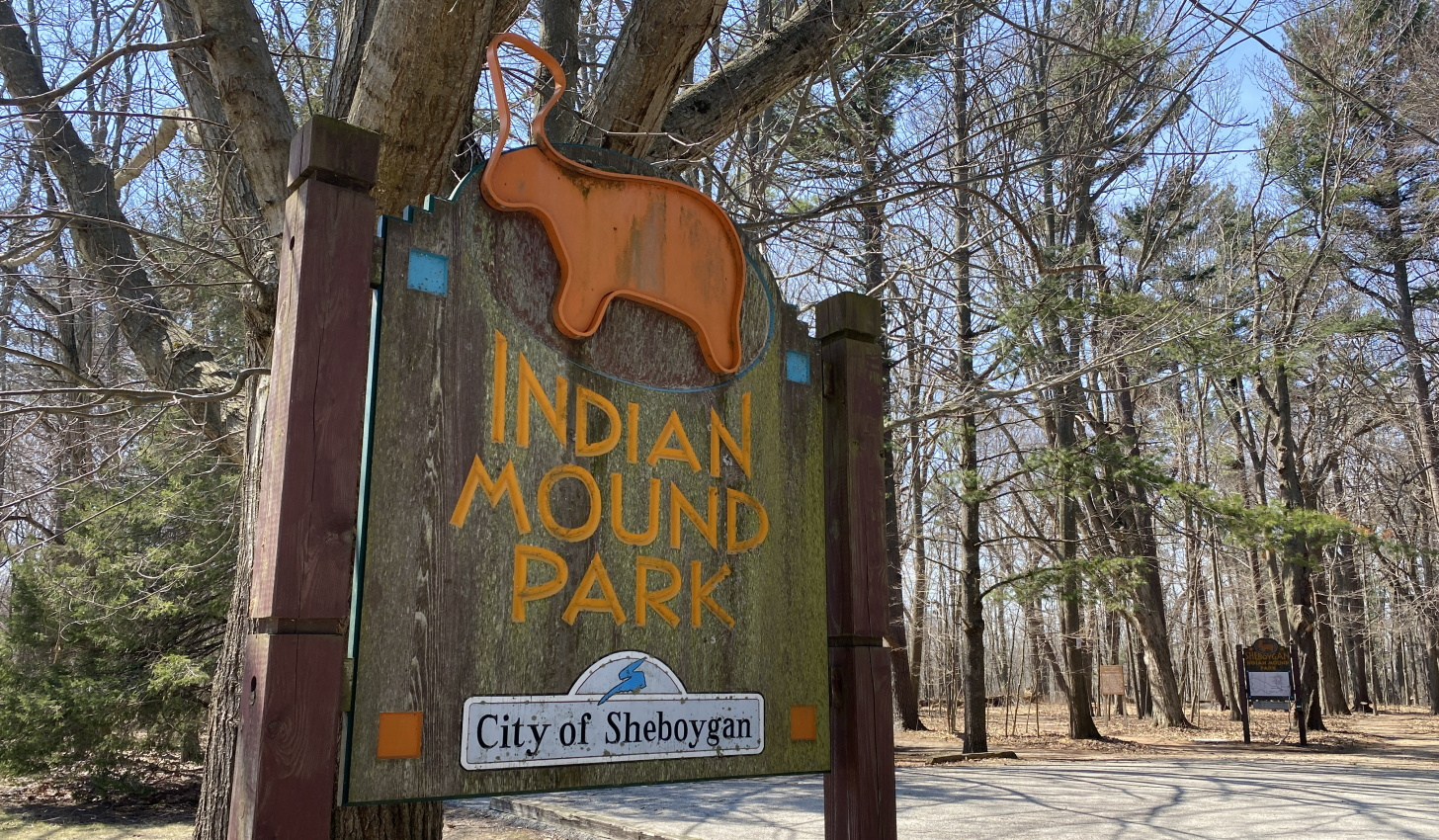

- Location within Wisconsin Location within the United States
- Location: 5000 South 9th Street; Sheboygan, Wisconsin; United States
- Coordinates: 43°41′45″N 87°43′8″W
- Area: 15 acres (6.1 ha)
- NRHP reference No.: 81000061
- Added to NRHP: July 23, 1981

The Sheboygan Indian Mound Park is a public park in Sheboygan, Wisconsin. Its main attraction is 18 Indian burial mounds distributed over 15 acres. The Kletzien Mound Group, located within the park, was added to the National Register of Historic Places in 1981. While the park is operated by the City of Sheboygan, it is surrounded by the Town of Wilson in a residential neighborhood. The park is protected under the Wisconsin Burial Sites Preservation Law.

In 1967 Julilly House Kohler organized and led a campaign to preserve the historic Indian mounds which resulted in the site being designated as a county park. In 1968 Kohler was the registered agent for the incorporation of the Sheboygan Indian Mound Park Association, Inc.

== Images ==
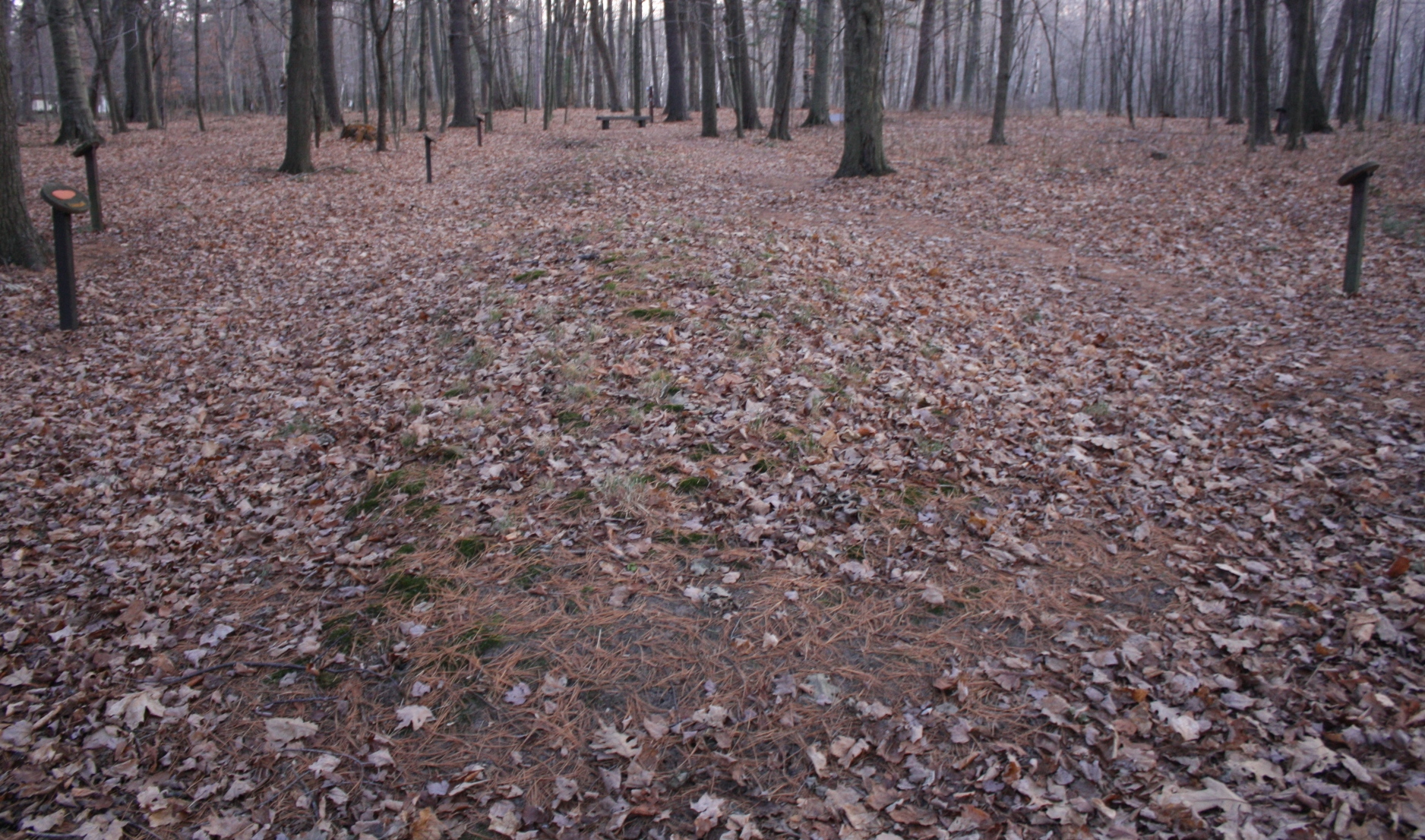

== See also ==
- National Register of Historic Places listings in Sheboygan County, Wisconsin
