= SS Atlanta =

Wooden hulled Great Lakes steamer

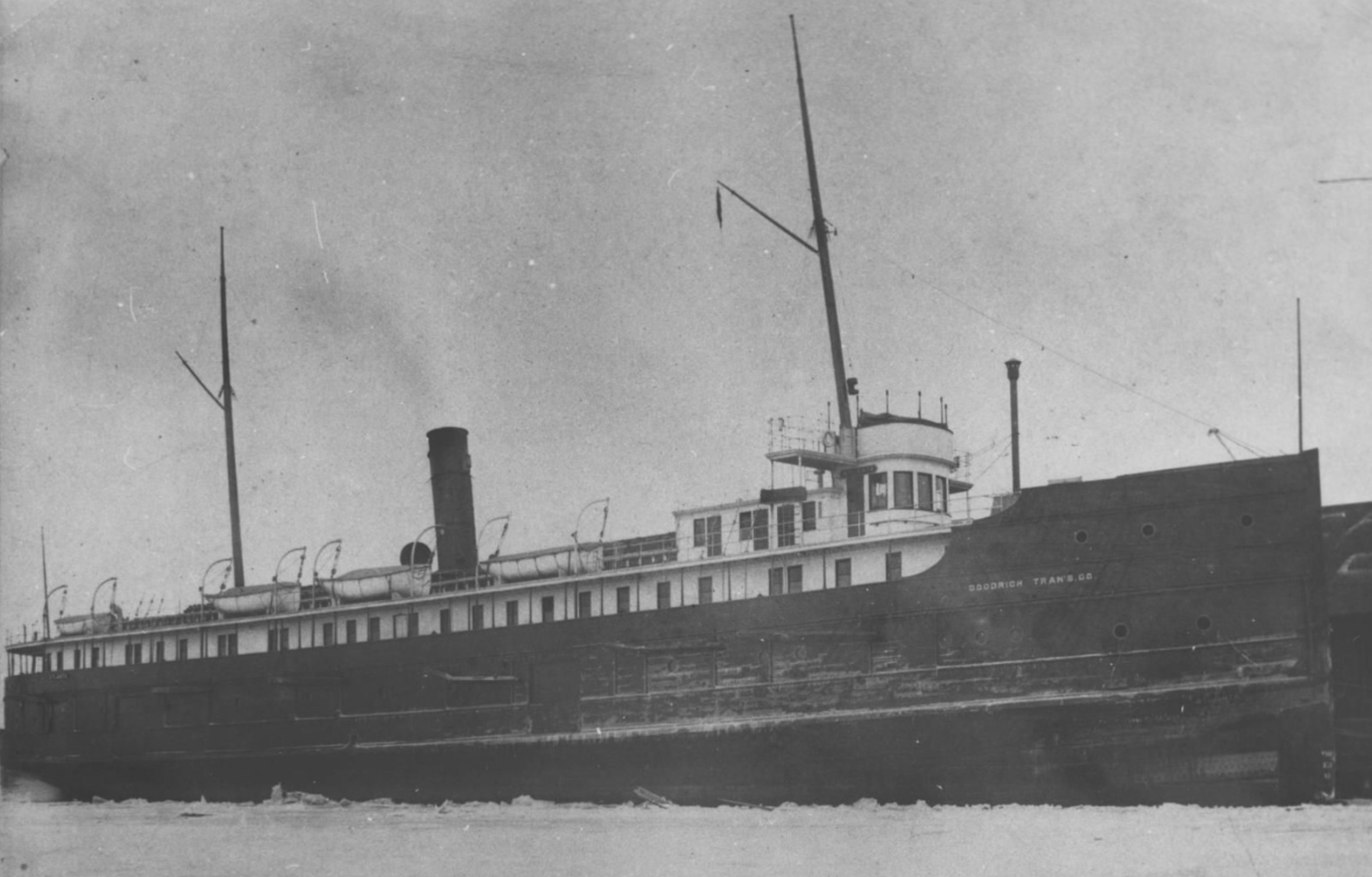
- The Atlanta prior to her sinking

History

United States
- Name: Atlanta
- Namesake: Atlanta, Georgia
- Builder: Cleveland Dry Dock Company
- Launched: April 25, 1891
- In service: May 21, 1891
- Out of service: March 18, 1906

General characteristics
- Type: Steamship
- Tonnage: 1,129.17 GRT; 958.06 NRT
- Length: 172 ft (52 m) LOA; 200 ft (61 m) LBP
- Beam: 32.3 ft (9.8 m)
- Depth: 22.6 ft (6.9 m)
- Installed power: 900 hp (670 kW) fore and aft compound steam engine

National Register of Historic Places data
Atlanta (steam screw) Shipwreck
U.S. National Register of Historic Places
Location within Wisconsin Location within the United States
Location	1.02 miles North Northeast of Amsterdam Park boat launch in Lake Michigan
Nearest city	Cedar Grove, Wisconsin
Coordinates	43.570883°N 87.7827°W
Built	1891
Architect	Cleveland Dry Dock Company
Architectural style	Steamship
MPS	Great Lakes Shipwreck Sites of Wisconsin MPS
NRHP reference No.	100001785
Added to NRHP	November 6, 2017

SS Atlanta was a wooden-hulled Great Lakes steamer that sank in Lake Michigan off the coast of Cedar Grove, Wisconsin, United States, after a failed attempt of her being towed to shore ultimately killing five out of her seven crew members on board. Her wreckage still remains at the bottom of the lake, and on November 6, 2017, the wreck of the Atlanta was listed on the National Register of Historic Places.

== History ==
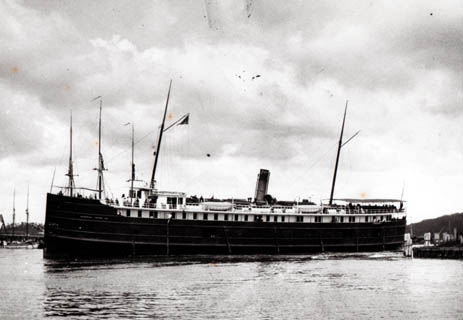
Port side view of the Atlanta

The Atlanta (Official number 106823) was built in 1891 in Cleveland, Ohio, by the Cleveland Dry Dock Company as a passenger and package freight vessel. She was built for the Goodrich Transportation Company of Kenosha, Wisconsin. The ship had an overall length of 220 feet (67 m) and was 200 feet (61 m) long between perpendiculars. The hull was 32.2 feet (9.8 m) wide and was 22.6 feet (6.9 m) deep. The ship had a gross tonnage of 1129.17 tons and a net tonnage of 958.06 tons. The Atlanta was equipped with a 900-horsepower fore and aft compound steam engine; the steam for the engine was provided by two Scotch marine boilers.

The Atlanta was launched on April 25, 1891. The ship was used to transport passengers and package freight across Lake Michigan. The Atlanta regularly made trips to Chicago, Illinois; Muskegon, Michigan; and Grand Haven, Michigan. The ship ran these trips in the shipping season between March and December before it was laid up for the winter. In 1895 the Atlanta's two Scotch boilers were replaced with new ones. The new boilers were located further forward inside the hull, this brought the stern 20 inches (51 cm) out of the water. The ship also received a new and wider afterbody. The Atlanta was later put on Wisconsin's winter fleet, and it visited ports on Lake Michigan from Chicago to Green Bay and Marinette, Wisconsin.

== Final voyage ==
On March 18, 1906, the Atlanta was sailing from Sheboygan, Wisconsin, to Milwaukee, Wisconsin, with 65 passengers on board. Her cargo hold was filled with miscellaneous items such as metal ware, porcelain enamelware, wooden furniture, porcelain and leather. When she was about 14 miles (23 km) south of Sheboygan, her crew discovered a fire in her cargo hold. The Atlanta's crew tried to combat the fire but failed. Even the automatic fire apparatus that was tested six days before the fire failed to put it out. The fire eventually got so bad that the Atlanta was stopped, and her crew and passengers took to the lifeboats. The fish tug Tessler spotted the burning Atlanta and went to assist the people on board. The Atlanta's deckhand Michael Hickey jumped off his ship, aiming to jump onto the Tessler but misjudged the distance and plummeted to his death between the two vessels. The ship's cook was saved by a fisherman named Charles Klein. The cook was trapped in the pantry of the Atlanta, but luckily Klein heard the cook's screams and climbed up onto the burning vessel and pulled the cook through a porthole. Eventually all the people climbed aboard the Tessler; later all the passengers and crew were transferred to the steamer Georgian which took them back to Sheboygan. The Tessler took the Atlanta in tow, but eventually cut her loose and let her burn to the waterline. The value of the Atlanta and her cargo totaled a $200,000 loss.

In 1920 the Atlanta was purchased by the Leathem & Smith Towing and Wrecking Company of Sturgeon Bay, Wisconsin who began salvaging her wreck on August 11, 1920. A diver named Perl Purdy and some other divers salvaged the Atlanta's engine, boilers and any valuable cargo that they could find. The divers claimed that the machinery was only worth money as scrap money and most of her metalwork was destroyed in the fire. One of the Atlanta's boilers was placed in the steamer M.H. Stuart in 1921.

== Wrecksite ==
The remains of the Atlanta lie in 17 feet (5.2 m) of water on the sandy bottom of Lake Michigan. She is 1.02 miles north-northeast of Amsterdam Park's boat launch in the town of Cedar Grove. The outline of the Atlanta is mostly complete, and can be seen from above, in some places her hull is up to 10 feet (3.0 m) high. Remains of the Atlanta's diagonal bracing and hogging trusses can be seen at the wreck site. The inside of her hull is filled remnants of piping, bits of her plumbing, electricity, propulsion machinery and various pieces of warped metal. Her propeller shaft, pillow block, shaft log and stuffing box can all be seen near or in her wreck. In 2016 students from the East Carolina University worked with the Wisconsin Historical Society to document, and survey her wreck. In 2021 it was included within the boundaries of the Wisconsin Shipwreck Coast National Marine Sanctuary.
