= German Corners, Wisconsin =

- Unincorporated community
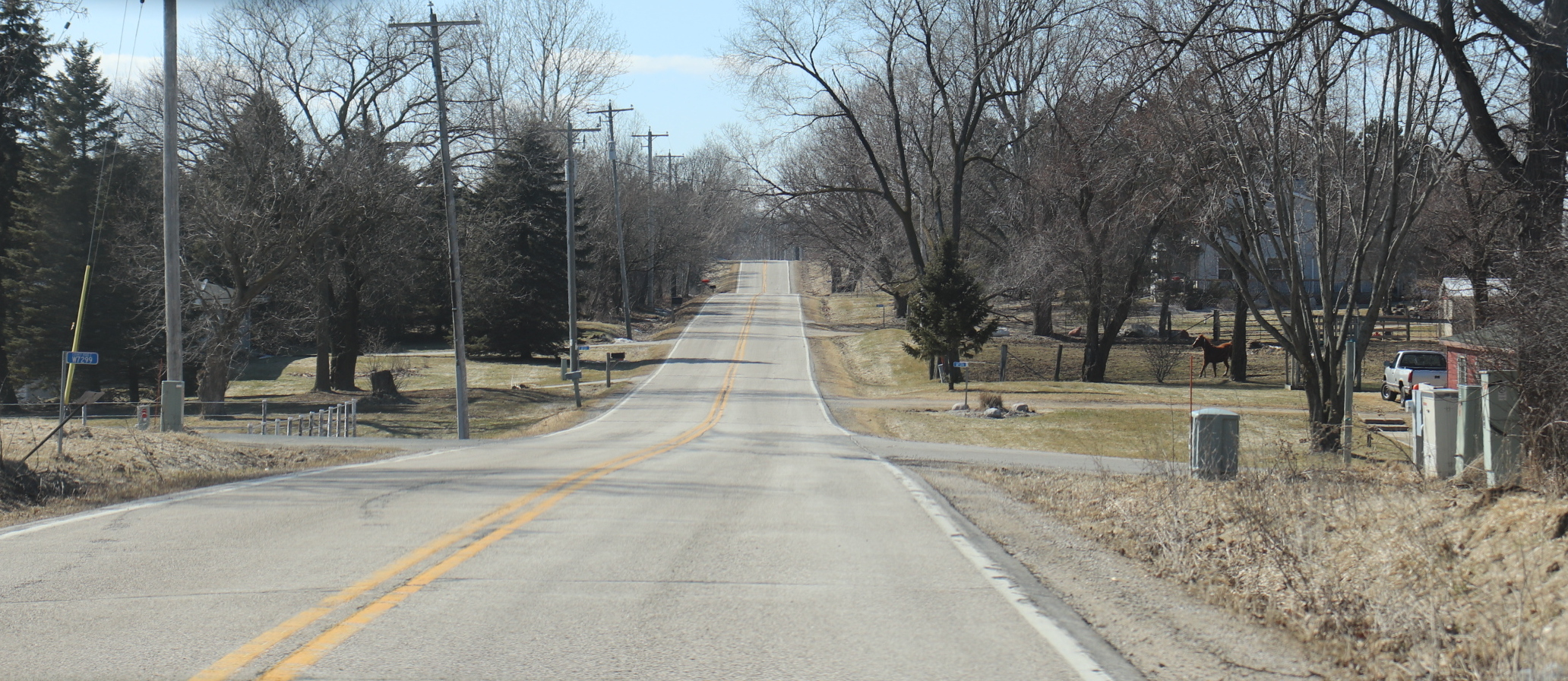
- Looking west at German Corners

- Location within Wisconsin Location within the United States
- Coordinates: 43°44′47″N 88°03′36″W
- Country: United States
- State: Wisconsin
- County: Sheboygan
- Elevation: 1,138 ft (347 m)
- Time zone: UTC-6 (Central (CST))
  - Summer (DST): UTC-5 (CDT)
- Area code: 920
- GNIS feature ID: 1565478

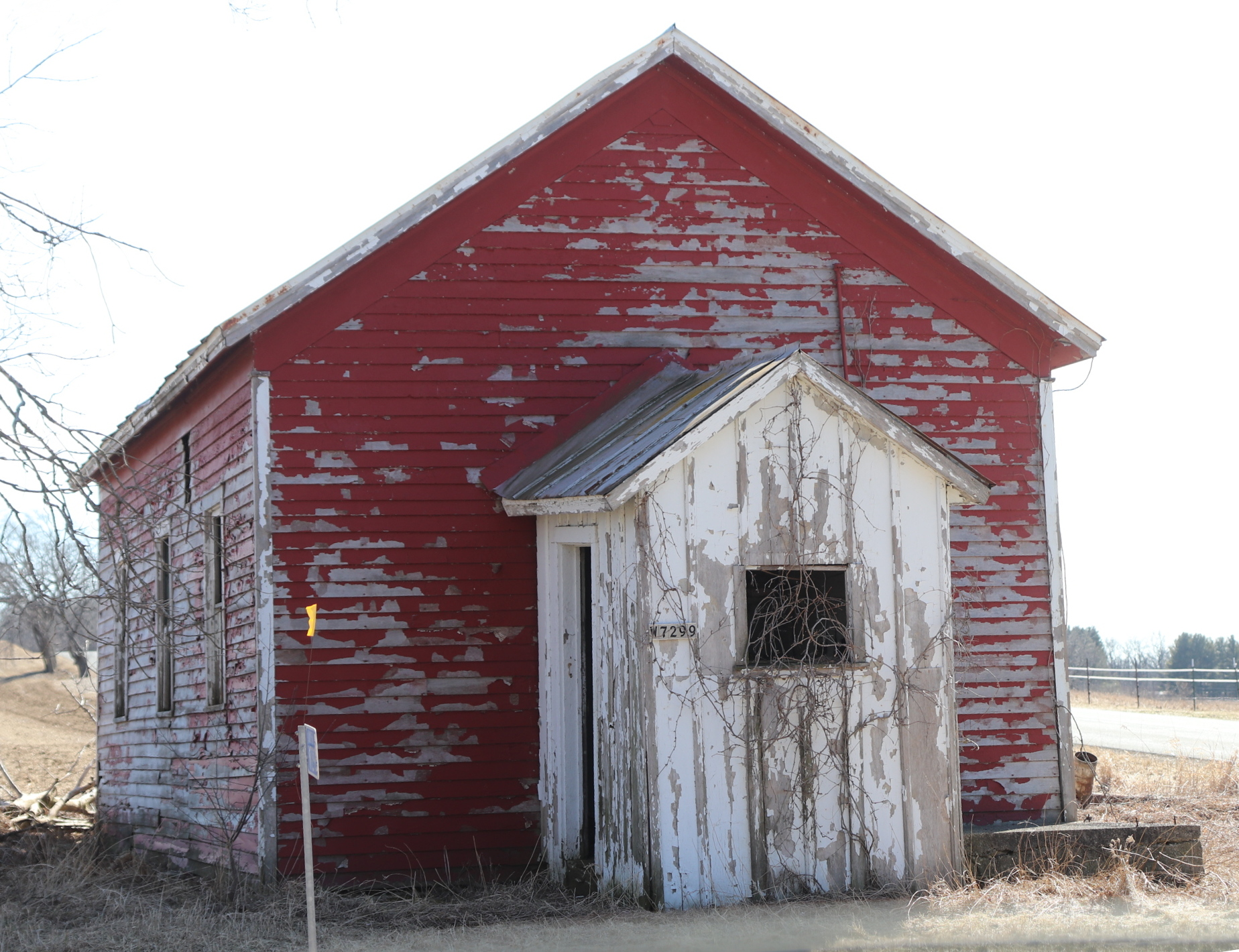
Schoolhouse in German Corners

German Corners is an unincorporated community located in the town of Greenbush, Sheboygan County, Wisconsin, United States.
