= Thomas M. and Bridget Blackstock House =

Historic house in Wisconsin, United States

- U.S. National Register of Historic Places
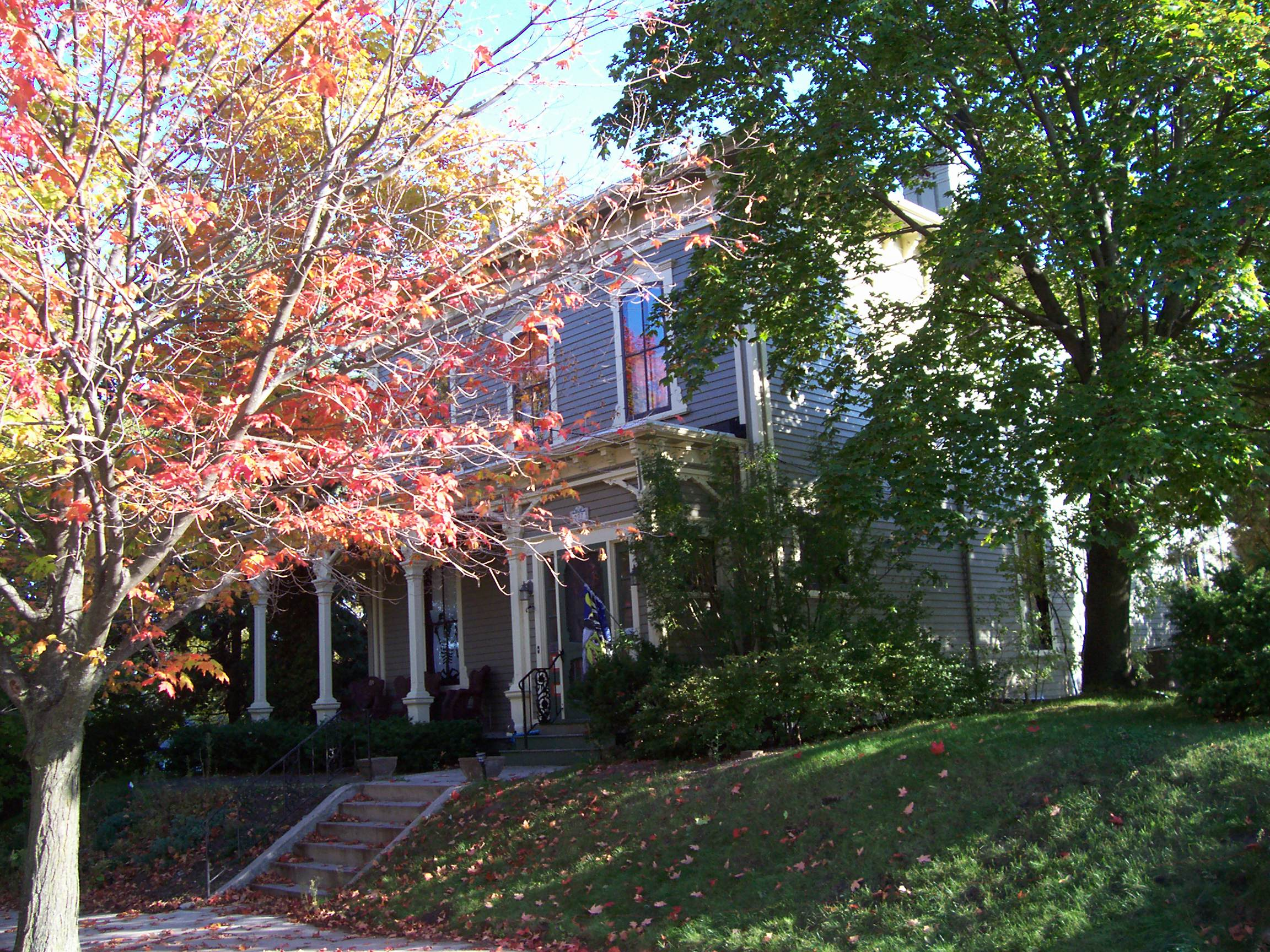

- Location within Wisconsin
- Interactive map showing the Blackstock House’s location
- Location: 507 Washington Court; Sheboygan, Wisconsin
- Coordinates: 43°45′13.1184″N 87°42′29.7318″W
- Built: 1882
- Architect: Arvin Luce Weeks
- Architectural style: Italianate
- NRHP reference No.: 95000256
- Added to NRHP: March 17, 1995

The Thomas M. and Bridget Blackstock House is located in Sheboygan, Wisconsin, United States. It was added to the National Register of Historic Places in 1995. The Blackstock House is a two-story, balloon frame, clapboard home designed by architect Arvin Luce Weeks in the Italianate style.

The house was originally built for Thomas M. Blackstock, an Irish immigrant who made his fortune from the Phoenix Chair Company and the Sheboygan Mutual Loan, Saving, and Building Association, and his wife, Bridget Blackstock (née Denn). Thomas Blackstock served as a city councilman for three terms, as Mayor of Sheboygan for four, and as a representative to the Michigan House of Representatives.

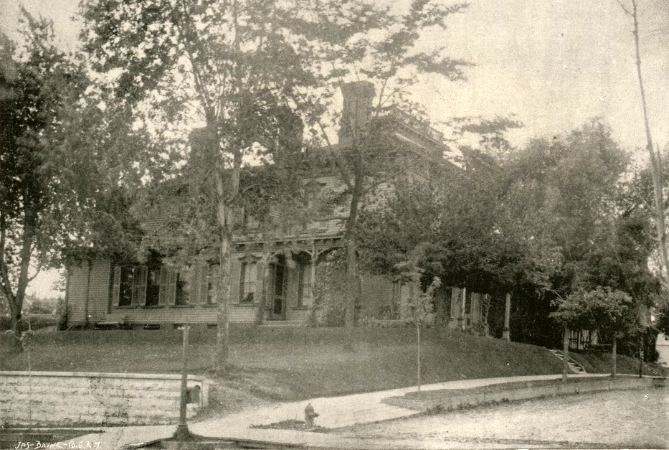
Photo of the Blackstock House in 1902
