= John Balzer Wagon Works Complex =

- U.S. National Register of Historic Places
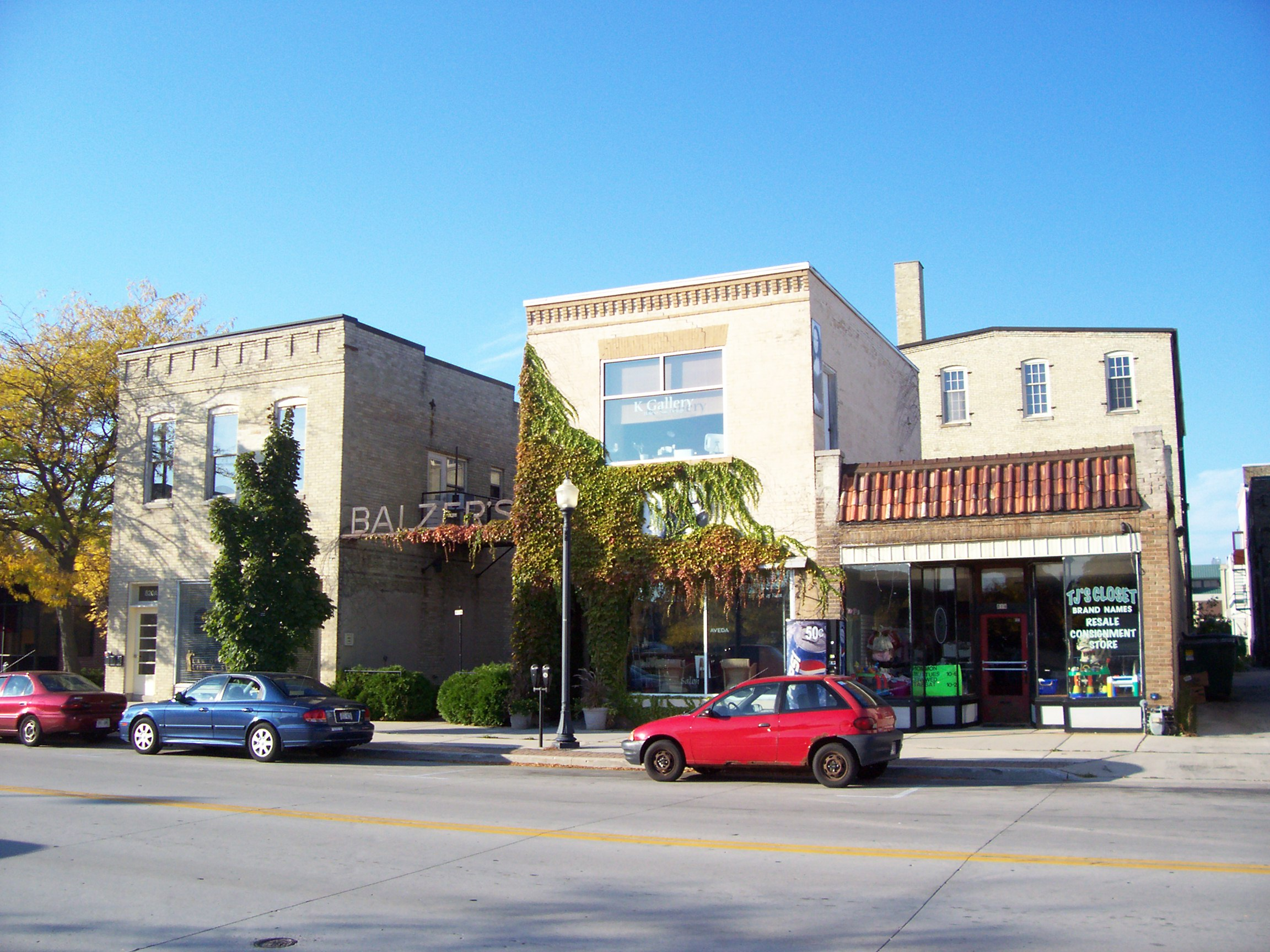
- John Balzer Wagon Works Complex
- Location: Sheboygan, Wisconsin
- Coordinates: 43.74994°N 87.7138°W
- Built: 1877, 1887
- Architectural style: Queen Anne
- NRHP reference No.: 92000028
- Added to NRHP: December 23, 1993

The John Balzer Wagon Works Complex is located in Sheboygan, Wisconsin, United States. It was added to the National Register of Historic Places in 1993.

John W. Balzer was born in 1827 in Goerlitz, Prussia. He served three years as an apprentice wagon maker there, and emigrated to the U.S. 1851. In 1853 he established a one-man wagon-and-sleigh-making shop in Sheboygan on the site of the current factory. As his business prospered, he added workers. As an example of his work, he received a $65 contract in 1865 to build a new hose cart for Sheboygan's volunteer fire department. In 1877 he built the 2-story cream brick factory at 818-820 Pennsylvania, which isn't included in the NRHP nomination because it has been remodeled.

In 1887 he added the similar 3-story cream brick factory at 820A Pennsylvania. This building has changed little from the time of construction - both inside and out - and is the subject of the NRHP nomination. The first story housed the wagon factory's blacksmith and some woodworking operations. The second story housed more woodworking operations. The third story is where paint and trim were applied to the wagons. The three stories were connected by a large freight elevator.

In 1881, Balzer's son John A. became a partner, and when the founder died in 1888, the son took over. In the early 1900s, as automobiles began to displace horses, the factory shifted operations to the manufacture of auto bodies, like many other wagon makers. In 1928 they added welding services and in 1934 auto body repair. The factory was used as a toy factory after World War II, then as a warehouse for many years. The founder's grandson, John A. Balzer Jr. operated a welding business in the showroom building into the 1970s.
