= Glenbeulah Mill/Grist Mill =

- U.S. National Register of Historic Places
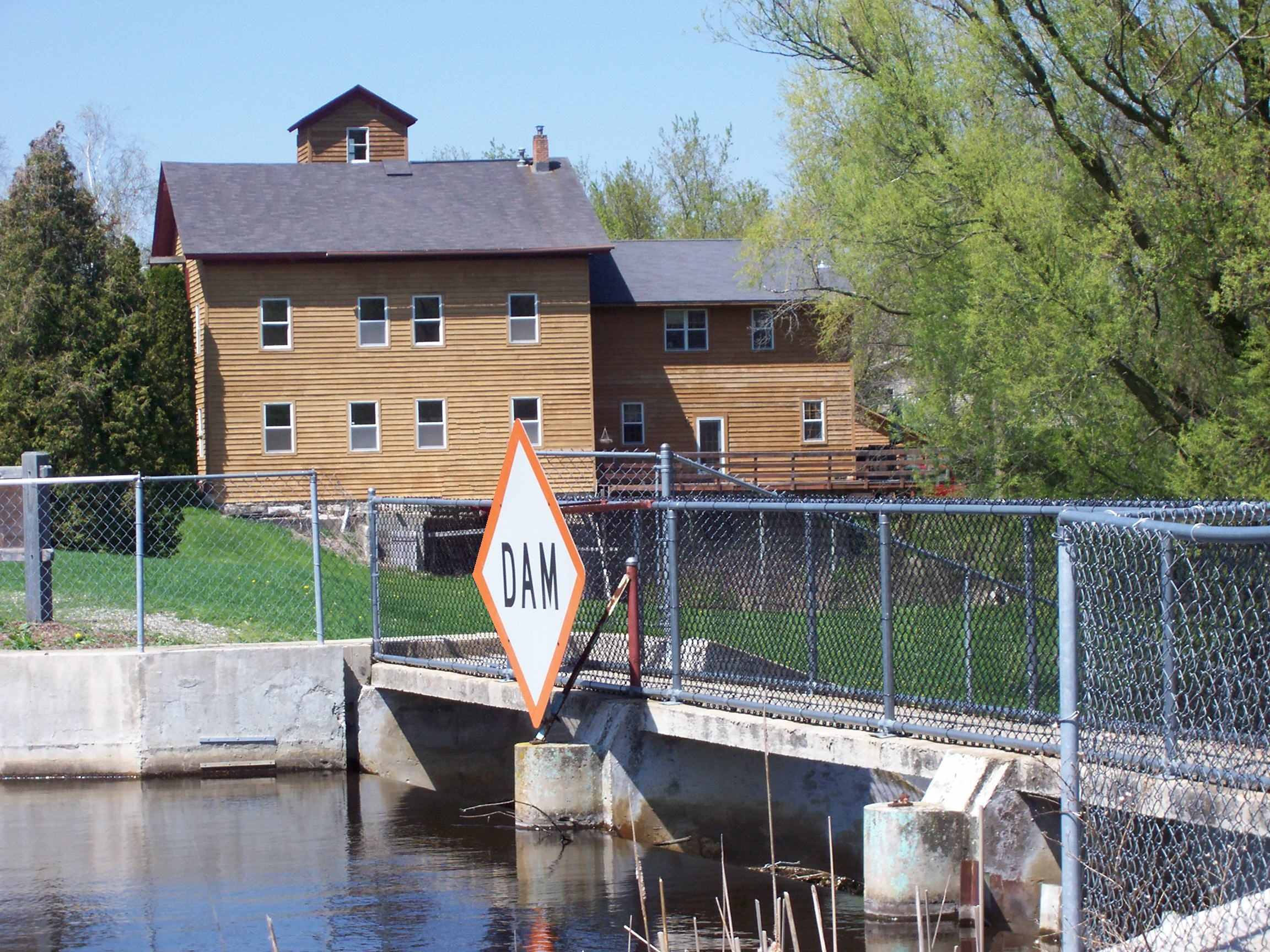
- Glenbeulah Mill/Grist Mill

- Location within Wisconsin
- Location: 241 Garden St, Glenbeulah, WI 53023
- Coordinates: 43.796081°N 88.043640°W
- Built: 1857
- NRHP reference No.: 84000678
- Added to NRHP: December 27, 1984

The Glenbeulah Mill/Grist Mill is located in Glenbeulah, Wisconsin. It was added to the National Register of Historic Places in 1984.
