= Stefanie H. Weill Center for the Performing Arts =

- Sheboygan Theatre
- U.S. National Register of Historic Places
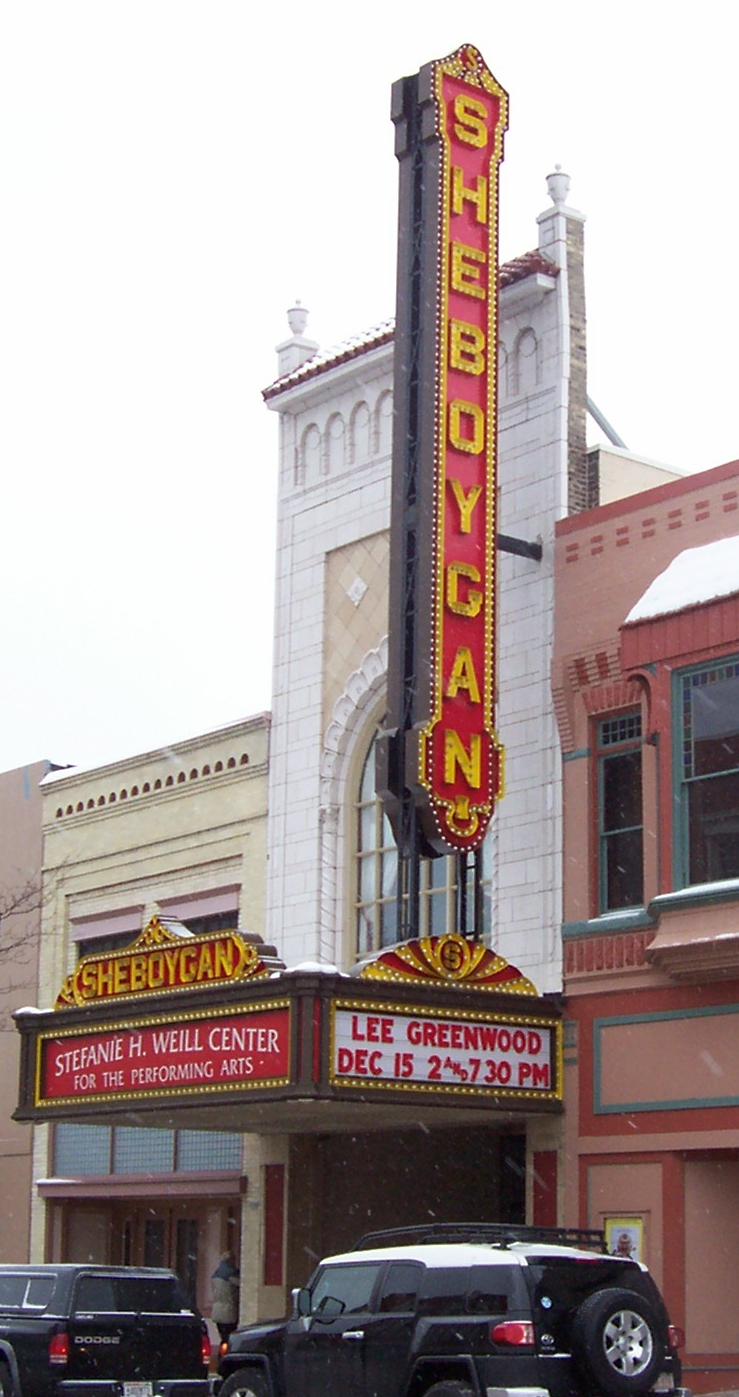
- Location: 826 North 8th Street; Sheboygan, Wisconsin; United States
- Coordinates: 43.75373°N 87.71319°W
- Built: 1928
- Architectural style: Spanish Colonial Revival
- NRHP reference No.: 99001606
- Added to NRHP: December 22, 1999

The Stefanie H. Weill Center for the Performing Arts (formerly the Sheboygan Theatre) is a historic theater in Sheboygan, Wisconsin.

== History ==
Designed in the Spanish Colonial Revival style, the Sheboygan Theater was constructed in 1928 for the Milwaukee Theatre Circuit of Universal Pictures Corporation at a cost of $600,000. The theater is an especially fine and intact example of the "atmospheric" type of movie theater developed in the 1920s, with an interior that suggests an evening in a Spanish garden. Carl Laemmle, founder of Universal, had roots in Oshkosh.

The theater was eventually purchased by the Marcus Corporation and "twinned" into two separate theaters, and known as the Plaza 8 Cinema (named for an unsuccessful downtown pedestrian mall) until it was closed in 1992, when Marcus expanded its multiplex theater on Sheboygan's west side. Despite the twinning, outside a re-sloping of the auditorium floor and some modernization for concessions and restroom facilities, most of the existing architectural details were left intact, but dormant behind facade construction to accommodate the divided auditorium for the twinning. It was the last theater remaining downtown as several others had either been torn down, damaged by fire, or adapted irreversibly to other uses through the 70's and 80's.

In 1996, the Weill Center Foundation purchased the building for the purpose of preserving, restoring and overseeing the future operation of the historic theater.

The property was placed on the National Register of Historic Places by the United States Department of the Interior, and the State of Wisconsin Register of Historic Places by the State Historical Society of Wisconsin, on December 22, 1999. The Weill complex includes many of the buildings in the block in which the theater stands, adapted for use by the theater for ticketing, rehearsal, conference room and storage uses.

The theater was the taping venue on October 2, 2019 for an episode of Golf Channel's Fehrety Live, where David Feherty previewed the (originally to be held in 2020) 2021 Ryder Cup at nearby Whistling Straits with American team captain Steve Stricker and European captain Pádraig Harrington.
