= Charles Robinson House =

Historic house in Wisconsin, United States

- U.S. National Register of Historic Places
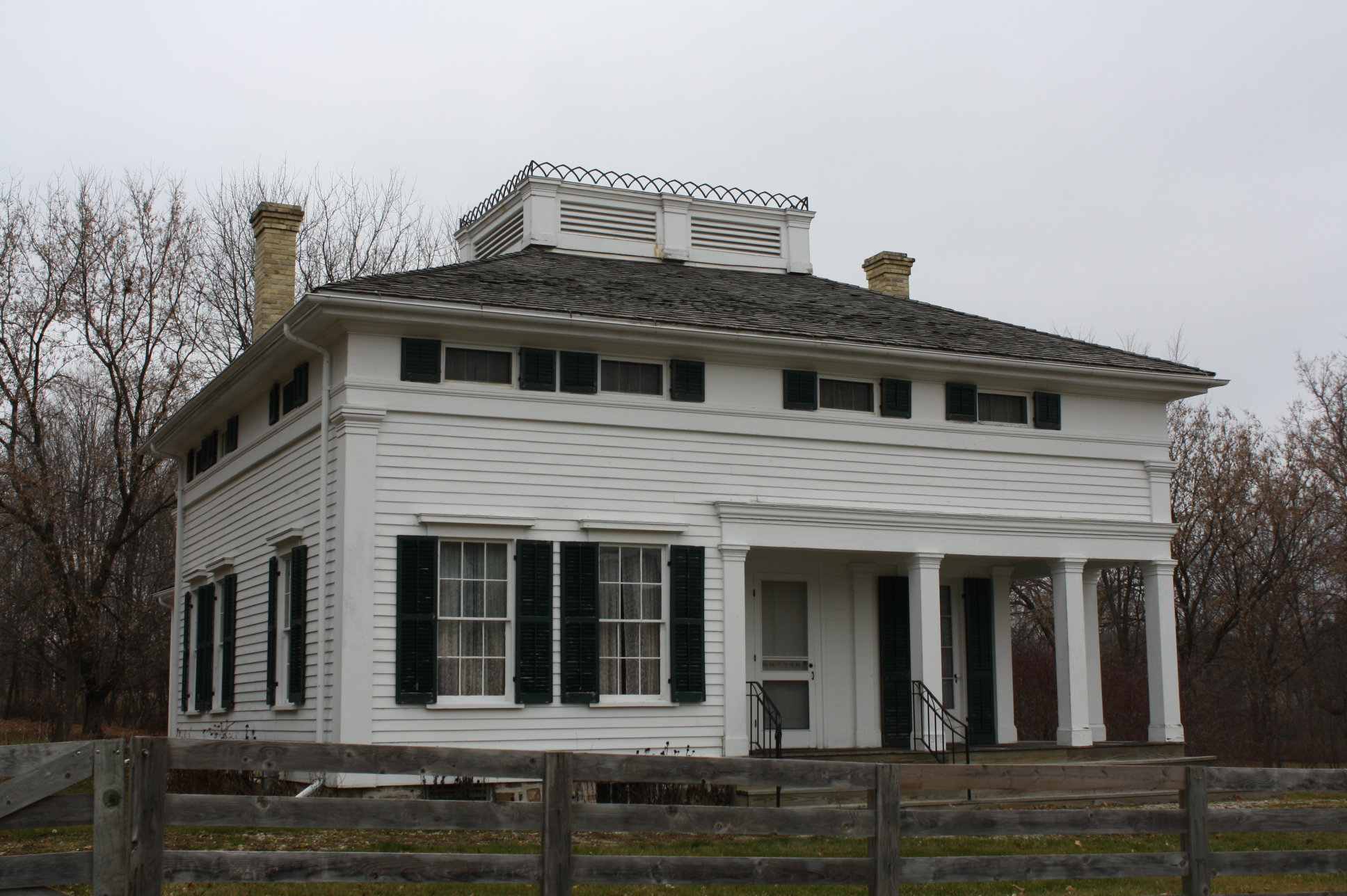
- Location: Greenbush, Wisconsin
- Coordinates: 43.77609°N 88.08639°W
- Built: c. 1855
- Architect: Charles Robinson
- Architectural style: Greek Revival
- NRHP reference No.: 84001125
- Added to NRHP: December 20, 1984

The Charles Robinson House is located in Greenbush, Wisconsin, United States. It was added to the National Register of Historic Places in 1984.
