= Greenbush, Wisconsin =

- Town
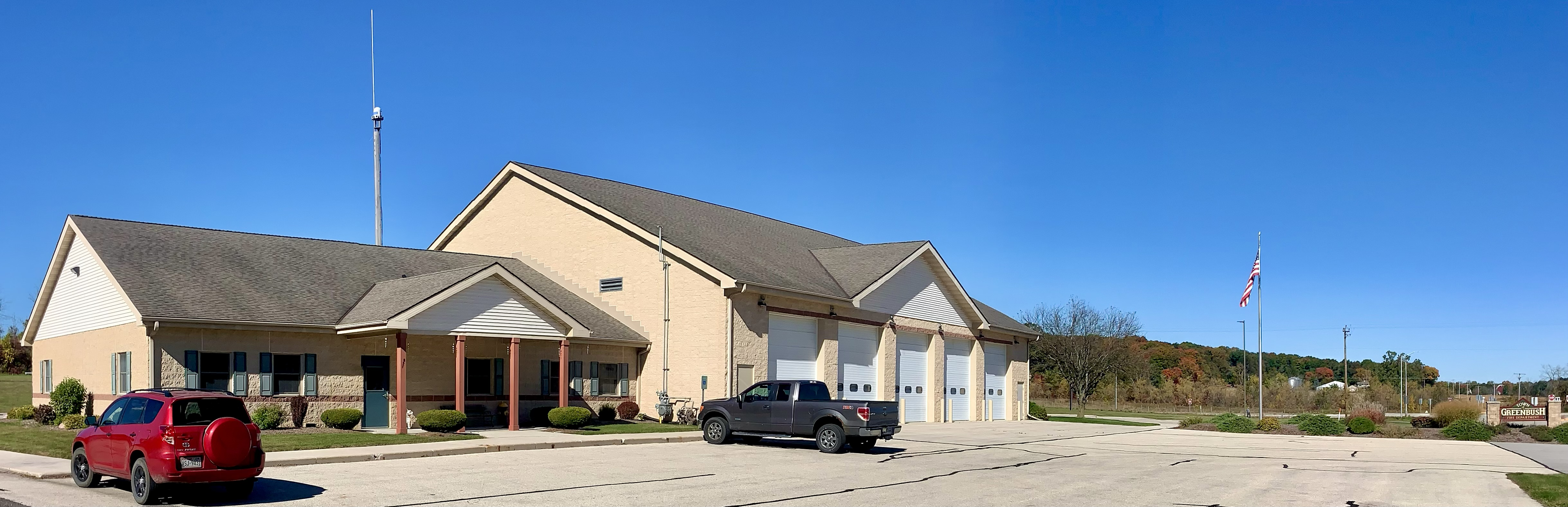
- Town hall

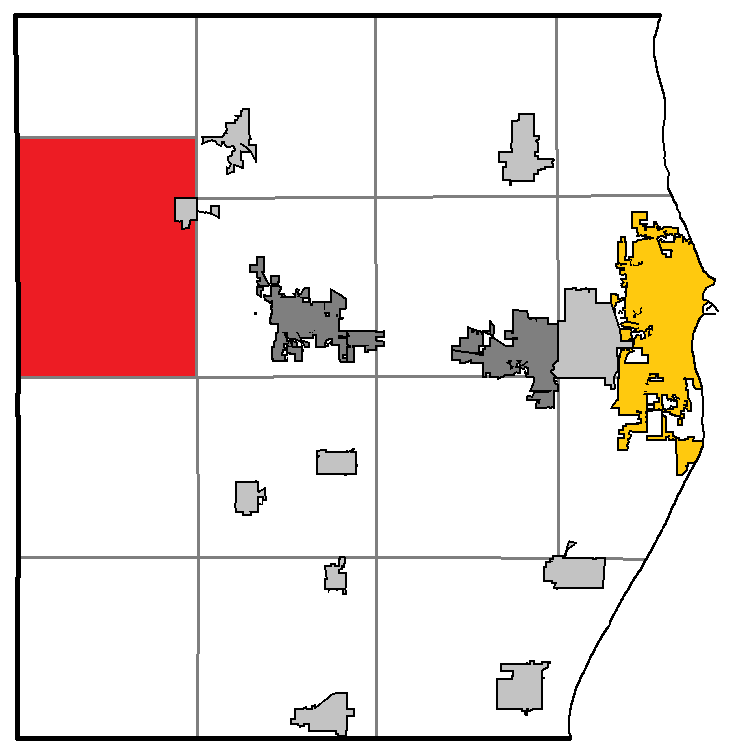
- Location of Greenbush, within Sheboygan County
- Coordinates: 43°46′39″N 88°6′4″W
- Country: United States
- State: Wisconsin
- County: Sheboygan

Area
  - Total: 47.4 sq mi (122.8 km^{2})
  - Land: 47.1 sq mi (122.1 km^{2})
  - Water: 0.27 sq mi (0.7 km^{2})
- Elevation: 974 ft (297 m)

Population (2020)
  - Total: 1,903
  - Density: 40.37/sq mi (15.59/km^{2})
- Time zone: UTC-6 (Central (CST))
  - Summer (DST): UTC-5 (CDT)
- Area code: 920
- FIPS code: 55-31100
- GNIS feature ID: 1583311
- Website: townofgreenbushwi.com

Greenbush is an unincorporated town in Sheboygan County, Wisconsin, United States. The population was 1,903 at the 2020 census. It is included in the Sheboygan, Wisconsin Metropolitan Statistical Area. The census-designated place of Greenbush is located in the town. The unincorporated community of German Corners is also located in the town. Greenbush hosts the Kettle Moraine Correctional Institution.

== Geography ==
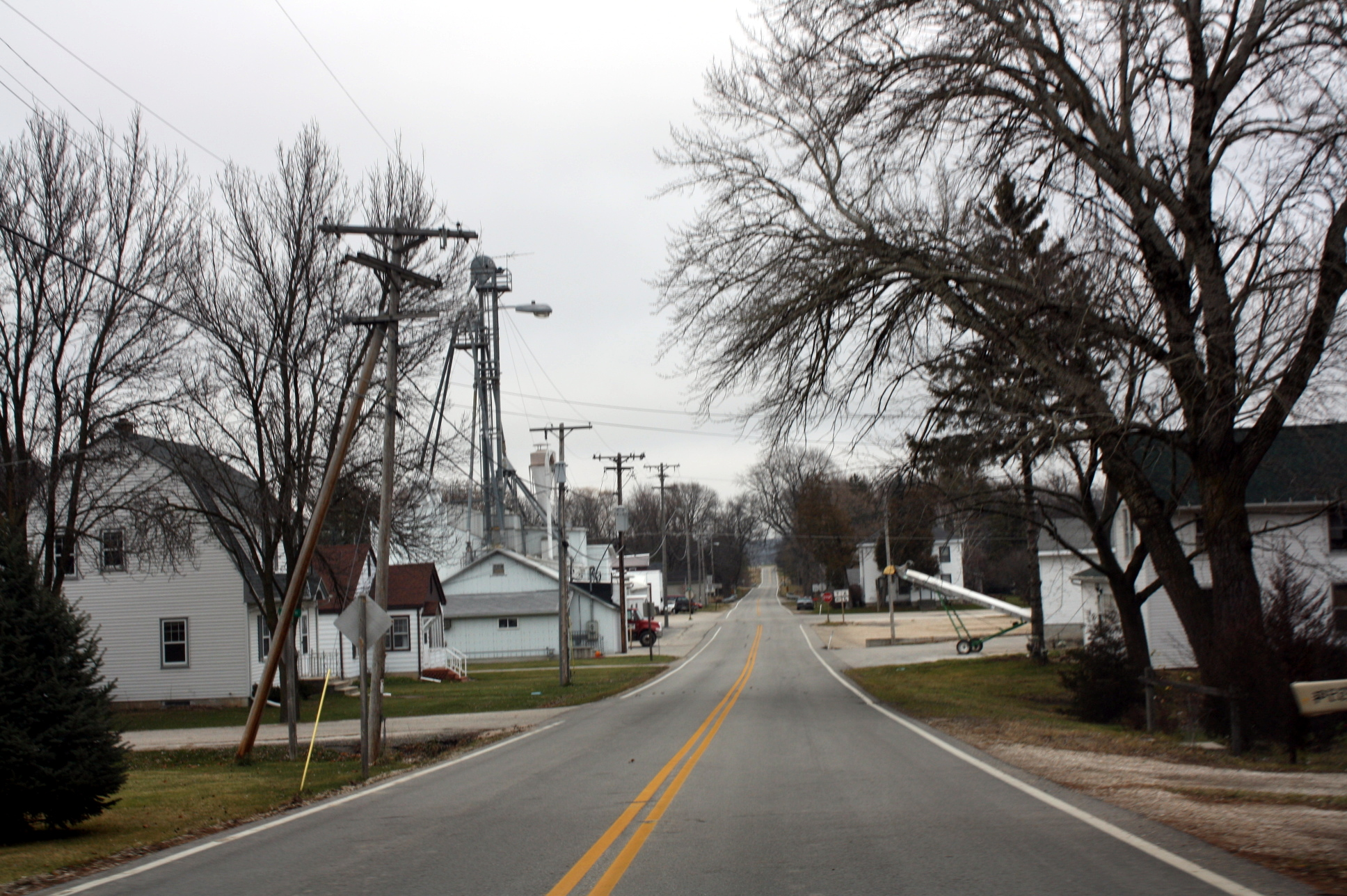
Downtown Greenbush

According to the United States Census Bureau, the town has a total area of 47.4 square miles (122.8 km^{2}), of which 47.2 square miles (122.1 km^{2}) is land and 0.3 square mile (0.7 km^{2}) (0.55%) is water.

== Demographics ==
Greenbush town, Sheboygan County, Wisconsin – Racial and ethnic composition Note: the US Census treats Hispanic/Latino as an ethnic category. This table excludes Latinos from the racial categories and assigns them to a separate category. Hispanics/Latinos may be of any race.
Race / Ethnicity (NH = Non-Hispanic)	Pop 2000	Pop 2010	Pop 2020	% 2000	% 2010	% 2020
White alone (NH)	1,955	1,483	1,525	70.50%	96.68%	80.14%
Black or African American alone (NH)	640	0	196	23.08%	0.00%	10.30%
Native American or Alaska Native alone (NH)	48	9	17	1.73%	0.59%	0.89%
Asian alone (NH)	4	10	17	0.14%	0.65%	0.89%
Pacific Islander alone (NH)	1	0	0	0.04%	0.00%	0.00%
Other race alone (NH)	6	0	4	0.22%	0.00%	0.21%
Mixed race or Multiracial (NH)	9	11	32	0.32%	0.72%	1.68%
Hispanic or Latino (any race)	110	21	112	3.97%	1.37%	5.89%
Total	2,773	1,534	1,903	100.00%	100.00%	100.00%

=== 2020 census ===
The 2020 census population of the city included 438 people incarcerated in adult correctional facilities.

=== 2000 census ===
As of the census of 2000, there were 2,773 people, 526 households, and 433 families residing in the town. The population density was 58.8 people per square mile (22.7/km^{2}). There were 551 housing units at an average density of 11.7 per square mile (4.5/km^{2}). The racial makeup of the town was 74.29% White, 23.15% African American, 1.73% Native American, 0.18% Asian, 0.04% Pacific Islander, 0.29% from other races, and 0.32% from two or more races. Hispanic or Latino of any race were 3.97% of the population.

There were 526 households, out of which 40.3% had children under the age of 18 living with them, 75.9% were married couples living together, 4.2% had a female householder with no husband present, and 17.5% were non-families. 12.5% of all households were made up of individuals, and 4.9% had someone living alone who was 65 years of age or older. The average household size was 2.91 and the average family size was 3.23.

In the town, the population was spread out, with 16.1% under the age of 18, 16.5% from 18 to 24, 45.4% from 25 to 44, 17.1% from 45 to 64, and 4.9% who were 65 years of age or older. The median age was 33 years. For every 100 females, there were 273.2 males. For every 100 females age 18 and over, there were 332.3 males.

The median income for a household in the town was $54,118, and the median income for a family was $56,029. Males had a median income of $36,306 versus $26,484 for females. The per capita income for the town was $17,050. About 2.0% of families and 2.5% of the population were below the poverty line, including 2.6% of those under age 18 and 2.3% of those age 65 or over.

== Historic sites ==
The town is home to the Wade House Historic Site.

== See also ==
- List of towns in Wisconsin
