= Conklin (surname) =

Other names
- Variant forms: Concklin, Conkling, Conckeleyne

Conklin is a surname of Irish origin

Spelling variations include Concklin, Conkling, Conckeleyne, Coughlin, Couglin and others.

== List of people surnamed Conklin ==
- Brian Conklin (born 1989), basketball player
- Carson Conklin (born 2004), American football player
- Cary Conklin (born 1968), American football player
- Chester Conklin (1888–1971), silent film comedian
- David Conklin (born 1955), American ice sledge hockey player
- Edgar Conklin (1822–1873), American politician and Wisconsin pioneer
- Edmund Smith Conklin (1884–1942), American author and psychologist
- Edwin Grant Conklin (1863–1952), American biologist
- Elias George Conklin (1845–1901), Canadian politician from Manitoba
- Frederick L. Conklin (1888–1974), American football player and coach, medical doctor and naval officer
- Gary Conklin, American documentary filmmaker
- George Emerson Conklin (1921–1942), American Marine
- Groff Conklin (1904–1968), science fiction anthologist
- Harold Conklin (1926–2016), anthropologist
- Heinie Conklin (1886–1959), American silent film actor
- Henry Conklin (1787–1867), American politician and Wisconsin pioneer
- Henry H. Conklin (1819–1884), Wisconsin pioneer, 1st mayor of Sheboygan, Wisconsin
- Hugh Conklin, college football player
- J. E. Conklin (1889–1965), American banker and politician from Nebraska
- Jack Conklin (born 1994), American football player
- James Conklin (politician) (1831–1899), American politician from Wisconsin
- James Tallmadge Conklin (1829–1893), first police chief of Fond du Lac, Wisconsin, Union Army quartermaster
- Jane Elizabeth Dexter Conklin (1831–1914), American writer
- Jennie Maria Drinkwater Conklin (1841–1900), American author and social activist
- John Conklin (born 1937), scenic designer
- John French Conklin (1891–1973), American brigadier general
- Jonathan S. Conklin (1770–1839), American politician from New York
- Josh Conklin (born 1979), American football player and coach
- Larry Conklin, American guitarist, singer, songwriter and music journalist
- Lee Conklin, American artist
- Lydi Conklin, American writer
- Nan Dieter-Conklin (1926–2014), American radio astronomer
- Pearl Conklin (1879–1961), American composer
- Roland R. Conklin (1858–1938), American financier
- Ryan A. Conklin (born 1985), United States Army Sergeant and television personality
- Scott Conklin (born 1958), American politician from Pennsylvania
- Sylvester J. Conklin (1829–1914), American politician from Wisconsin
- Ty Conklin (born 1976), American ice hockey player
- Tyler Conklin (born 1995), American football player
- William Conklin (1872–1935), American actor
- William A. Conklin (1837–1913), American zoologist
- William J. Conklin (1923–2018), American architect and archaeologist
- William T. Conklin (1908–1990), American politician from New York

== See also ==
- Conkling (disambiguation)
