= Fred A. Dennett =

American politician and businessman (1849–1920)

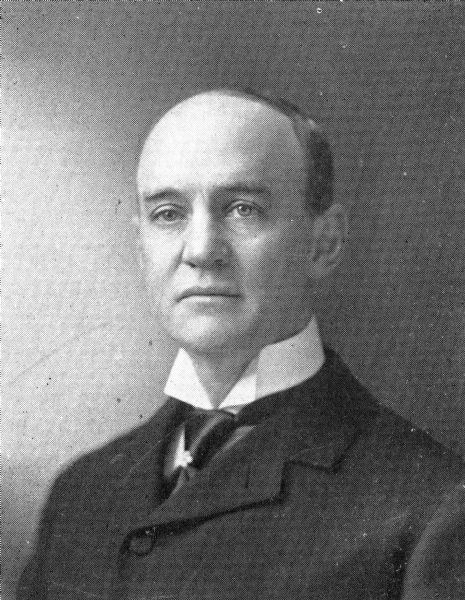

30th Mayor of Sheboygan, Wisconsin
- In office April 1901 – April 1903
- Preceded by: Charles A. Born
- Succeeded by: Charles A. Born

Member of the Wisconsin Senate from the 20th district
- In office January 4, 1897 – January 7, 1901
- Preceded by: Dennis T. Phalen
- Succeeded by: George W. Wolff

Chief Clerk of the Wisconsin Senate
- In office January 4, 1875 – January 3, 1876
- Preceded by: J. H. Waggoner
- Succeeded by: A. J. Turner

Personal details
- Born: May 19, 1849 Greenville, Maine, U.S.
- Died: May 11, 1920 (aged 70) Sheboygan, Wisconsin, U.S.
- Resting place: Wildwood Cemetery, Sheboygan
- Party: Republican
- Spouse: Clara Elizabeth Rawson (m. 1879–1920)
- Children: Julia (Barrett)^{(b. 1882; died 1933)}

Fred A. Dennett (May 19, 1849 – May 11, 1920) was an American businessman and Republican politician from Sheboygan, Wisconsin. He was the 30th mayor of Sheboygan (1901–1903), and represented Sheboygan County for four years in the Wisconsin Senate (1897–1901). Earlier in his career, he served one term as chief clerk of the Wisconsin Senate (1875) and worked as a clerk in the state Assembly for several years before that.

== Early life and career ==
Dennett was born in Greenville, Piscataquis County, Maine, but came to Wisconsin with his parents at age 2. They first settled in Sheboygan before relocating to Sheboygan Falls, Wisconsin. He was educated in the public schools in Sheboygan Falls, and then attended Bryant, Stratton, & Spencer Commercial College in Milwaukee, Wisconsin.

After school, he went to Beloit, Wisconsin, where he was employed by Proctor & Stone, reaper manufacturers, and later became secretary of the company. During that time, he also served several years as a part time employee of the Wisconsin Legislature. In 1868, he was hired as engrossing clerk for the Wisconsin State Assembly. He subsequently served as Assembly bookkeeper for the 1869, 1870, and 1871 terms. In the 1873 term, he was hired as assistant chief clerk of the Assembly. Then, in 1875, he was elected chief clerk of the Wisconsin Senate.

In 1879, he formed a partnership with Lowell Holden Parker under the firm name Parker & Dennett for the manufacturing of harvesters and binders. That business only lasted until 1882, when Dennett was hired as an agent for William Deering & Co. of Philadelphia. He returned to Sheboygan in 1886, and started his own business manufacturing furniture. He established the Wisconsin Chair Company at Port Washington, Wisconsin, in 1888.

== Political career ==
In 1896, Dennett was the Republican Party nominee for Wisconsin Senate in the 20th Senate district, which then comprised Sheboygan and Ozaukee counties. He defeated Democrat James Leahy, receiving 60% of the vote in the general election and winning a four-year term. He did not seek renomination in 1900.

Shortly after leaving office, Dennett was elected mayor of Sheboygan, defeating the incumbent mayor Charles A. Born. A key issue in the election was that Born had rejected Andrew Carnegie's library grant program. Over the next several years, Dennett was frequently mentioned as a candidate for Governor of Wisconsin for the anti-La Follette faction of the Wisconsin Republican Party, but he never ultimately ran in either 1902, 1904, or 1906.

== Water commission ==
Shortly after leaving office as mayor, Dennett became a member of the city water commission. In 1905, Sheboygan had planned to build their own waterworks plant. A private water company, Sheboygan Waterworks, already existed in the city and convinced the city council to abandon plans to build their own plant; the Waterworks company instead pledged to sell their water plant to the city at some future date. After agreeing to terms of a sale in 1907, the Waterworks refused to hand over certain equipment, and therefore was deemed in default in January 1908. Ultimately the city acquired the water plant, and Dennett remained on the water commission overseeing the plant for several more tumultuous years.

In 1909, Dennett, along with the other commissioners, Otto B. Joerns and then-mayor Theodore Dieckmann, voted to extend the water plant's intake pipe deeper into Lake Michigan to get purer water—at the time, it was believed that the poor condition of the plant under private management had led to a spread of Typhoid in the city. The new construction contract led to another lawsuit, but the intake was completed by the end of 1909. Quickly, however, tension began to emerge between the water commission and Sheboygan residents over the price of water in the city. Despite making a significant profit, the commission refused to cut water rates, and planned to use the funds for additional improvements to the city water pumps and distribution infrastructure. Public pressure led the city council to demand to see the plans and bids for the improvements, but the commission replied that—based on the language of the ordinance which established the commission—they did not believe the city council had authority to demand that information. This ultimately led to a split in the commission, as mayor Dieckmann sided with members of the city council seeking to expand the water commission from three members to five. The vote to expand the commission failed 9–7 in a contentious city council meeting.

By the end of 1912, Dennett and Joerns and their allies were seeking to remove Dieckmann from leadership of the commission, and Dieckmann and his allies on the city council organized a vote on a referendum to try again to expand the commission to five members. Dieckmann's side pointed to roughly $100,000 in profits the waterworks had accumulated (about $3.3M adjusted for inflation), and suggested the money could be redistributed to the city's population. The referendum failed in a special election held on December 3, 1912. The belligerence dragged on for another two years and involved the state legislature in an effort to clarify the legal status of the waterworks. Dieckmann was succeeded as mayor by Joerns in 1915, and at that time Dennett announced that he would like to retire from the commission. He officially resigned later that year.

== Later years ==
By 1905, Dennett purchased a factory in Two Rivers, Wisconsin, in order to consolidate several of his furniture manufacturing companies. At the time, he had plants in Sheboygan, Manitowoc, and Port Washington. Dennett later announced that he planned to close his Manitowoc factory, then one of the largest employers in the city, and move the manufacturing business to Buffalo, New York. Denning sold the Port Washington building in the fall of 1905 with a lease to continue using the factory for another few months. In January 1906, however, a catastrophic fire swept through the factory, destroying the building and a large supply of finished product; a firefighters was killed by falling debris. Because of confusion over the terms of the sale of the building and the lease of the facility back to Wisconsin Chair, a lawsuit ensued over insurance claims by the two companies. Wisconsin circuit judge Michael Kirwan ruled in favor of Wisconsin Chair, finding that the company which purchased the building had been required by the terms to purchase insurance.

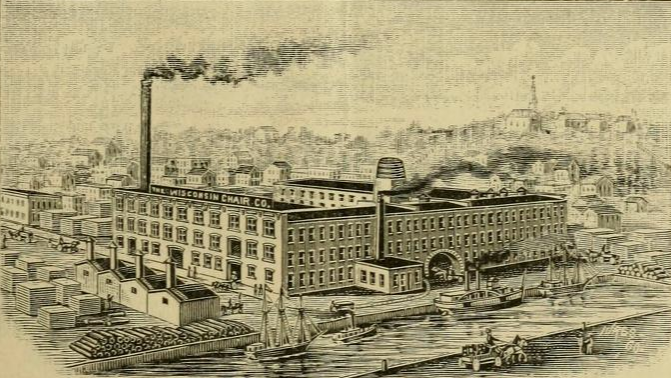
The Wisconsin Chair Company's factory in 1899

While that litigation was pending, Dennett organized another company at Port Washington in 1909, the Wisconsin Lumber and Veneer Company. A short time later, he converted a number of his businesses into phonograph manufacturing.

Dennett died of a heart attack in Grafton, Wisconsin, on May 11, 1920, while visiting his New York Recording Laboratories business in that village. He had suffered from heart disease for several years.

== Personal life and family ==
Fred Dennett was one of at least four children born to Richard Dennett and Sarah Lucretia (née Gale). His maternal grandfather, Richard Gale Jr., served for two years in the Massachusetts militia during the American Revolutionary War.

While serving in the state Senate, Dennett bought up nearly all of the land on Chambers Island, a relatively large island in the Green Bay. The island became a family vacation spot for the rest of their lives. After his death, his daughter ran a girls camp on the island until selling the property.

== Electoral history ==
=== Wisconsin Senate ===
Wisconsin Senate, 20th District Election, 1896
Party	Candidate	Votes	%	±%
General Election, November 3, 1896
Republican	Fred A. Dennett	8,263	60.72%	+17.24pp
Democratic	James Leahy	5,346	39.28%	
Plurality		2,917	21.43%	+8.39pp
Total votes		13,609	100.0%	+55.18%
Republican gain from Democratic				

== See also ==
- List of mayors of Sheboygan, Wisconsin

Wisconsin Senate
Preceded by Dennis T. Phalen	Member of the Wisconsin Senate from the 20th district January 4, 1897 – January 7, 1901	Succeeded by George W. Wolff
Political offices
Preceded by Charles A. Born	Mayor of Sheboygan, Wisconsin; April 1901 – April 1903	Succeeded by Charles A. Born
