= Conkling =

Conkling is a surname. Notable people with the surname include:

- Alfred Conkling (1789–1874), American lawyer and politician
- Alfred R. Conkling (1850–1917), American geologist, lawyer, and author, and politician
- Chris Conkling (born 1949), American screenwriter
- E. Leslie Conkling (1931–2014), American politician and educator
- Frederick A. Conkling (1816–1891), American politician
- Grace Conkling (1878–1958), American writer
- Helen Conkling (born 1933), American poet
- Hilda Conkling (1910–1986), American poet
- James C. Conkling (1816–1899), American politician
- Mabel Conkling (1871–1966), American sculptor
- Philip Wheeler Conkling (born ?), conservation attorney and author
- Roscoe Conkling (1829–1888), American politician
- Roscoe P. Conkling (1889–1954), Missouri supreme court justice
- Roscoe Seely Conkling (1884–1956), deputy attorney general of New York
- Wallace E. Conkling (1896–1976), American Episcopal bishop

== See also ==
- Conkling, Kentucky, unincorporated community in Owsley County, Kentucky, United States
- Conklin (disambiguation)
