= List of mayors of Sheboygan, Wisconsin =

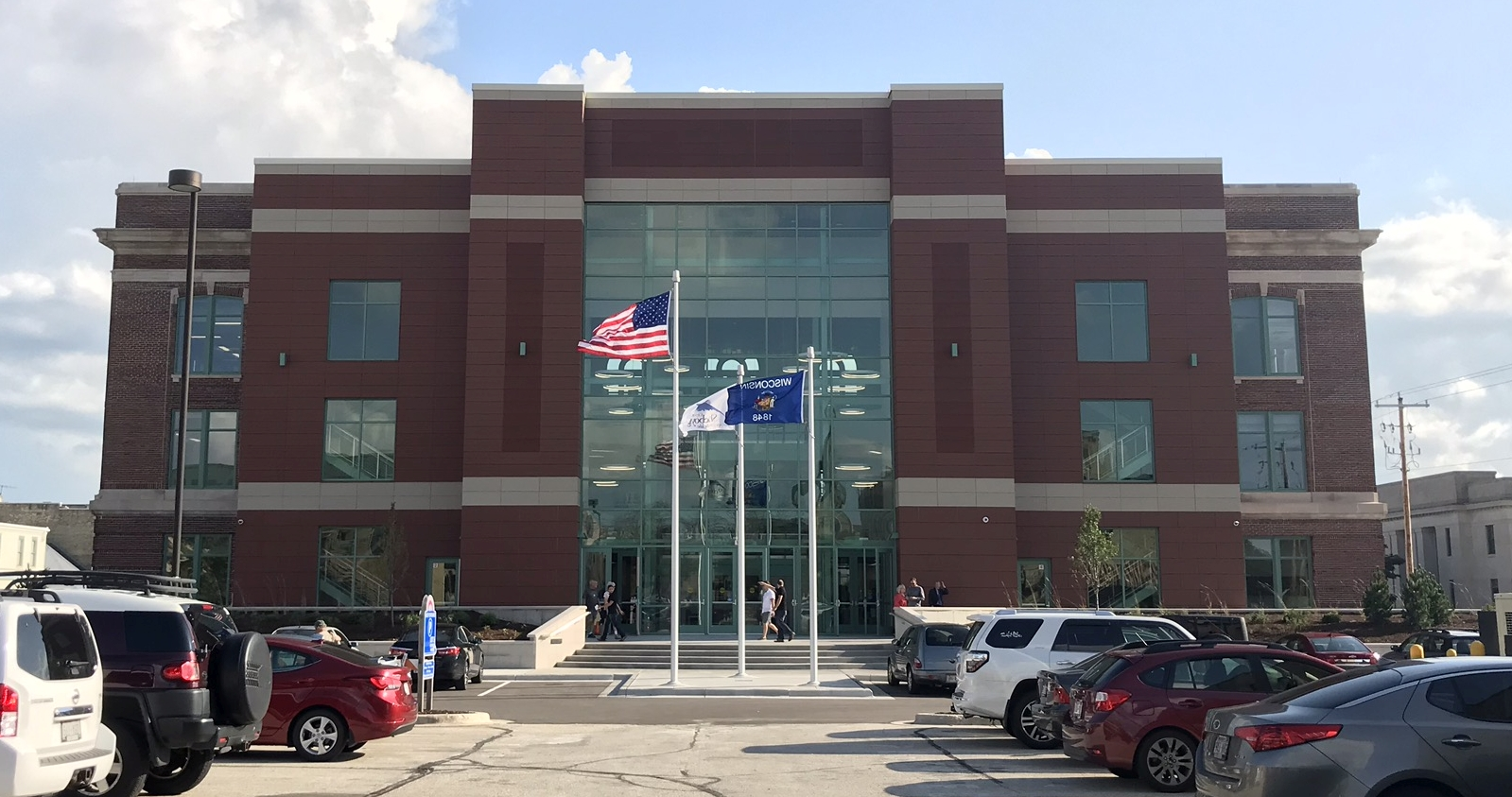
Sheboygan City Hall in 2019

This is a list of mayors of Sheboygan, Wisconsin, USA. Sheboygan was originally incorporated as a village in 1846 before Wisconsin statehood. Sheboygan was re-incorporated as a city in 1853. Since then, it has always utilized a mayor-council form of government. Mayors were initially elected every year; a two-year mayoral term was adopted in 1895, and a four-year term was implemented in 1961.

The first mayor of Sheboygan was Henry H. Conklin, a pioneer lawyer and land speculator who was also the first village president of Sheboygan. The current mayor is Ryan Sorenson, who was the youngest mayor in city history when elected.

== Village presidents (1846–1853) ==
Order	President	Term start	Term end	Notes
1	Henry H. Conklin	1846	1847	Elected February 9, 1846.
2	Joseph F. Kirkland	1847	1848	
3	H. Smith (Note: Possibly "Hiram" Smith or "Horatio N." Smith)	1848	1849	
4	Worthy W. McKillip	1849	1850	
5	W. Anable (Note: Probably "William Stewart" Anable)	1850	1851	
6	W. Smith (Note: Most likely "Warren" Smith)	1851	1852	
7	W. Gossline (Note: Possible alternate spelling "Ghoslin")	1852	1853	

== Mayors with 1-year term (1853–1895) ==
Unless otherwise indicated, Wisconsin's mayoral elections have always taken place on the first Tuesday of April, with inauguration following within two weeks.

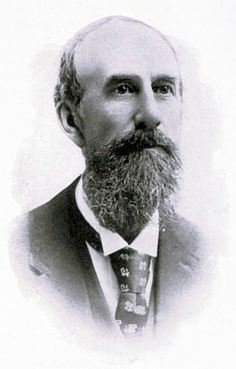
Thomas M. Blackstock, 12th, 14th, and 23rd mayor of Sheboygan

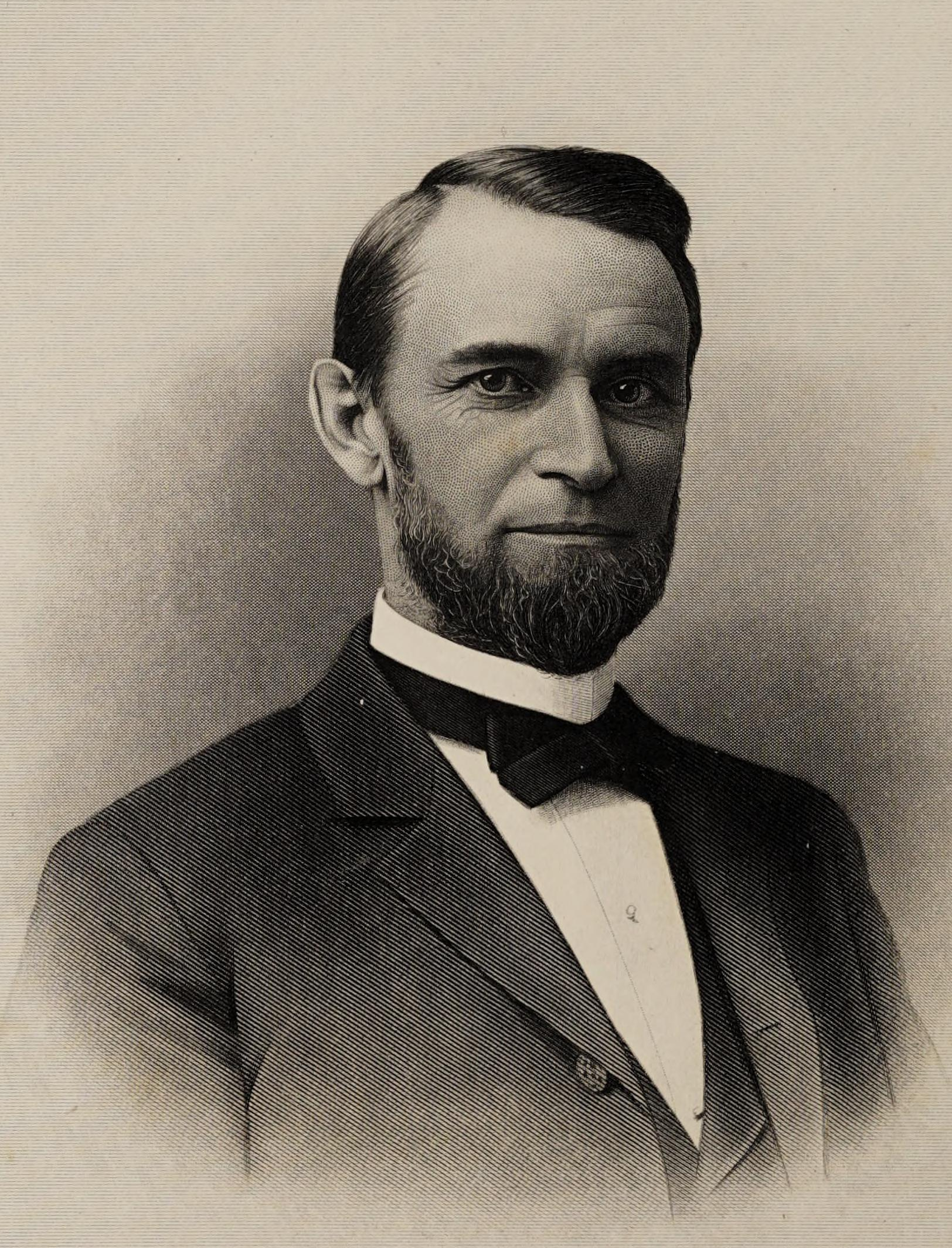
William Henry Seaman, 21st mayor of Sheboygan, later a federal judge

Order	Mayor	Term start	Term end	Notes
1	Henry H. Conklin	1853	1853	Elected 1853. Resigned August 9, 1853.
-	Francis R. Townsend	1853	1854	Interim mayor.
2	Joseph F. Kirkland	1854	1855	
3	Elijah Fox Cook	1855	1857	First two-term mayor.
4	Zebulon P. Mason	1857	1858	
5	William N. Shafter	1858	1859	
6	Zebulon P. Mason	1859	1860	
7	Bille Williams	1860	1862	
8	Godfrey Stamm	1862	1863	
9	Joseph L. Moore	1863	1866	Elected 1863, 1864, 1865, 1866. First three-term mayor. First four-term mayor. Died by suicide October 19, 1866.
10	Jonathan O. Thayer	1866	1868	Interim mayor until 1867 election. Elected 1867.
11	Francis Geele	1868	1870	Elected 1868, 1869.
12	Thomas M. Blackstock	1870	1871	Elected 1870.
13	William Elwell	1871	1872	Elected 1871.
14	Thomas M. Blackstock	1872	1873	Elected 1872.
15	James Bell	1873	1874	Elected 1873.
16	Bille Williams	1874	1875	Elected 1874.
17	George End	1875	1876	Elected 1875.
18	Francis Geele	1876	1879	Elected 1876, 1877, 1878. First five-term mayor.
19	George End	1879	1880	Elected 1879.
20	Francis Geele	1880	1881	Elected 1880. First six-term mayor.
21	William Henry Seaman	1881	1882	Elected 1881.
22	Michael Winter	1882	1884	Elected 1882, 1883.
23	Thomas M. Blackstock	1884	1885	Elected 1884.
24	James Bell	1885	1889	Elected 1885, 1886, 1887, 1888.
25	John M. Saeman	1889	1891	Elected 1889, 1890.
26	James Bell	1891	1891	Elected 1891. Died December 24, 1891.
-	Frederick C. Runge	1891	1892	Interim mayor.
27	John M. Kohler	1892	1893	Elected 1892.
28	Francis Geele	1893	1895	Elected 1893, 1894. First seven-term mayor. First eight-term mayor.

== Mayors with 2-year term (1895–1961) ==
Order	Mayor	Term start	Term end	Notes
29	Charles A. Born	1895	1901	Elected 1895.
30	Fred A. Dennett	1901	1903	Elected 1901.
31	Charles A. Born	1903	1905	Elected 1903.
32	Theodore Dieckmann	1905	1915	Elected 1905, 1907, 1909, 1911, 1913.
33	Otto B. Joerns	1915	1917	Elected 1915.
34	Herman F. Albrecht	1917	1921	Elected 1917, 1919.
35	Herman Schuelke	1921	1925	Elected 1921, 1923.
36	Otto Geussenhainer	1925	1927	Elected 1925.
37	Herman Schuelke	1927	1931	Elected 1927, 1929.
38	Otto Geussenhainer	1931	1933	Elected 1931.
39	Willard M. Sonnenburg	1933	1939	Elected 1933, 1935, 1937.
40	Herman C. Runge	1939	1941	Elected 1939.
41	Charles Bau	1941	1943	Elected 1941.
42	Willard M. Sonnenburg	1943	1951	Elected 1943, 1945, 1947, 1949. Died March 13, 1951.
-	Leonard F. Anhalt	1951	1951	Interim mayor.
43	Edward C. Schmidt	1951	1955	Elected 1951, 1953.
44	Rudolph J. Ploetz	1955	1957	Elected 1955.
45	John Bolgert	1957	1961	Elected 1957, 1959.

== Mayors with 4-year term (1961–present) ==
In 1960, the Sheboygan city council voted to double the mayoral term from two years to four years.

Order	Mayor	Term start	Term end	Notes
46	Emil C. A. Muuss	1961	1965	Elected 1961.
47	Joseph R. Browne	1965	1969	Elected 1965.
48	Roger D. Schneider	1969	1973	Elected 1969.
49	Richard Suscha	1973	1985	Elected 1973, 1977, 1981. Longest serving mayor (tied with Schneider)
50	Richard Schneider	1985	1997	Elected 1985, 1989, 1993. Longest serving mayor (tied with Suscha)
51	James Schramm	1997	2005	Elected 1997, 2001.
52	Juan Perez	2005	2009	Elected 2005.
53	Robert Ryan	2009	2012	Elected 2009. Recalled March 2012.
54	Terry Van Akkeren	2012	2013	Elected at February 21, 2012, recall election.
55	Mike Vandersteen	2013	2021	Elected 2013, 2017.
56	Ryan Sorenson	2021	present	Elected 2021.

== See also ==
- Sheboygan history
- Sheboygan, Wisconsin
- Sheboygan County, Wisconsin
- Political subdivisions of Wisconsin
