= James Lafferty (disambiguation) =

James Lafferty is an actor.

James Lafferty may also refer to:

- James Delamere Lafferty (1849–1920), Canadian politician
- James V. Lafferty (1856–1898), Irish-American inventor
- James Lafferty (Wisconsin politician) (1837–?), American politician
- James Michael Lafferty (born 1963), American businessman and consultant
