= Conklin =

Conklin may refer to:

== Places ==
In the United States

- Conklin, Missouri, an unincorporated community
- Conklin, New York, a town
- Conklin, Michigan, an unincorporated community

Elsewhere

- Conklin, Alberta, a hamlet in Alberta, Canada

== People ==
- Conklin (surname)

== Other ==
- Conklin Shows, a North American amusement company

== See also ==
- Conkling (disambiguation)
