= Rienzi Cemetery (Fond du Lac, Wisconsin) =

Cemetery in Fond du Lac, Wisconsin

- Interactive map of Rienzi Cemetery

Details
- Established: 1848
- Location: N6101 Co Rd K, Empire, Wisconsin
- Country: US
- Coordinates: 43.76258°N 88.38499°W
- Size: 60 acres (24 ha)
- No. of interments: >24,000
- Find a Grave: Rienzi Cemetery

Rienzi Cemetery is a 60-acre burial site located in the town of Empire, Wisconsin, overlooking the city of Fond du Lac. Established in 1845, it is one of the oldest known cemeteries in Wisconsin. Originally created by Wisconsin Territory governor Nathaniel P. Tallmadge to bury his son William Davies Tallmadge, the cemetery is now the final resting place for over 24,000 people, including many of the most prominent citizens from the history of Fond du Lac.

== History ==
The land now utilized for Rienzi Cemetery was formerly part of the estate of Nathaniel P. Tallmadge, the 3rd governor of the Wisconsin Territory. Tallmadge, along with other prominent early pioneers of the area, purchased land on "the Ledge" (the far western edge of the Niagara Escarpment) overlooking the current city of Fond du Lac, Wisconsin. The first burial at the site was Tallmadge's son, William Davies Tallmadge, who died at age 18 in 1845. Eight years later, Tallmadge donated 8.5 acres from his estate to create a public cemetery. The site was later expanded with 12 additional acres, before expanding to its present 60-acre size.

== Notable interments ==
- William Adamson (1834–1907), Wisconsin state representative
- John Bannister (1810–1860), 7th mayor of Fond du Lac
- Edward S. Bragg, U.S. representative, U.S. Ambassador to Mexico, Civil War brigadier general
- Henry Conklin (1787–1867), early settler at Fond du Lac, contributor to the cemetery grounds, New York state legislator
- Henry H. Conklin (1819–1884), 1st mayor of Sheboygan, Wisconsin
- Mason C. Darling (1801–1866), U.S. representative, 1st & 4th mayor of Fond du Lac
- Charles Henry De Groat (1838–1904), Civil War brigadier general
- Harrison H. Dodd (1824–1906), 20th mayor of Fond du Lac, co-founder of the Order of the Sons of Liberty paramilitary organization
- Charles A. Eldredge (1820–1896), U.S. representative
- Louis J. Fellenz Sr. (1882–1953), Wisconsin state senator and circuit judge
- Louis J. Fellenz Jr. (1915–1993), Wisconsin state senator
- Edwin H. Galloway (1825–1876), 9th mayor of Fond du Lac, state representative
- Mark Robert Harrison (1819–1894), painter, actor, art teacher
- William Hiner (1821–1880), 14th mayor of Fond du Lac, state senator
- Daniel Hooker (1831–1894), Wisconsin state representative
- Raphael Katz (1841–1902), Wisconsin state representative
- Thomas Wilson Spence (1846–1912), Wisconsin state representative
- Grier Tallmadge (1827–1862), third son of Nathaniel Tallmadge, West Point graduate, Civil War captain, died at Fort Monroe
- Nathaniel P. Tallmadge (1795–1864), creator of the cemetery, U.S. senator, 3rd governor of the Wisconsin Territory
- William Davies Tallmadge (1827–1845), second son of Nathaniel Tallmadge, first burial at the cemetery site
- William Van Pelt (1905–1996), U.S. representative
- Owen A. Wells (1844–1935), U.S. representative
- David E. Wood (1823–1862), Wisconsin state representative, Civil War colonel
