= Thomas Blackstock =

Thomas Blackstock may refer to:

- Thomas M. Blackstock (1834–1913), Irish-American politician and businessman
- Tommy Blackstock (1882–1907), Scottish footballer
