= Henry H. Conklin =

American politician (1819–1884)

1st Mayor of Sheboygan, Wisconsin
- In office April 1853 – August 9, 1853
- Preceded by: W. Gossline (village president)
- Succeeded by: Francis R. Townsend (interim); Joseph F. Kirkland (elected)

1st Village President of Sheboygan, Wisconsin
- In office February 1846 – April 1847
- Preceded by: Position established
- Succeeded by: Joseph F. Kirkland

Personal details
- Born: May 29, 1819 Poughkeepsie, New York, U.S.
- Died: July 17, 1884 (aged 65) Walnut, Kansas, U.S.
- Resting place: Rienzi Cemetery, Fond du Lac, Wisconsin
- Party: Republican; Whig (before 1854)
- Spouse: Catherine Dean Strong (m. 1846; died 1868)
- Children: Henry Edgar Conklin^{(b. 1848; died 1908)}; Harriet Strong Conklin^{(b. 1849; died 1868)}; George Conklin^{(b. 1851; died 1865)}; Edgar Louis Conklin^{(b. 1851; died 1923)}; Frank Conklin^{(b. 1856; died 1865)}; Mary Conklin^{(b. 1859; died 1865)}; Ann Conklin^{(b. 1859)}; Frederic Talmage Conklin^{(b. 1863; died 1943)}; Charles Conklin^{(b. 1865; died 1865)}
- Parent: Henry Conklin (father)
- Relatives: Edgar Conklin (brother); James Tallmadge Conklin (brother); Moses M. Strong (brother-in-law)
- Education: Trinity College

Henry Hewitt Conklin (May 29, 1819 – July 17, 1884) was an American lawyer, land speculator, and Wisconsin pioneer. He was one of the earliest settlers of the city of Sheboygan, Wisconsin, he was the first village president when Sheboygan was incorporated as a village, and was then the first mayor when Sheboygan became a city in 1853. With his father, Henry Conklin, he was also one of the first American settlers in what is now Fond du Lac County, Wisconsin.

== Biography ==
Henry H. Conklin was born into a wealthy family in Dutchess County, New York, in 1819. He was raised and educated in Dutchess County, then obtained a collegiate education at Trinity College, graduating in the class of 1833. He then went on to attend lectures at the City University of New York City, including early lectures by Samuel Morse on the concept of electric telegraphy.

His family's fortunes suffered significantly from the Panic of 1837, and his father, Henry Conklin, decided to sell their properties in New York to seek new opportunities in the western territories. Conklin traveled with his family to the Wisconsin Territory in 1841. Shortly after the family was established at Fond du Lac, however, Conklin went east to invest in land at the site that would become Sheboygan, Wisconsin, in partnership with Joseph L. Moore. Conklin established a general store in Sheboygan, and invested in several critical infrastructure projects for the new settlement; he was an investor in the project that established the first shipping pier at Sheboygan and an officer in the Sheboygan and Fond du Lac Plank Road company, establishing an overland road to Fond du Lac. Conklin, along with other early landowners, deeded land to the city for use as a cemetery, but that cemetery was later replaced by a municipal park.

Conklin and his family were active in the Whig Party, and he attended the 1844 Whig state convention as a delegate from Sheboygan. In 1846, the Wisconsin Territory legislature incorporated Sheboygan as a village, and at the first election in the village, in February 1846, Conklin was elected village president.

In 1853, the Wisconsin Legislature incorporated the city of Sheboygan, the first city election was held April 5, 1853, and Conklin was elected the first mayor. Conklin served less than half of his term as mayor, however, resigning in August 1853 to return to Fond du Lac. In Fond du Lac, Conklin became associated with the Republican Party of Wisconsin.

Later in life, Conklin moved to Walnut, Kansas. He suffered a stroke a few months after his arrival and never recovered; he died at Walnut on July 17, 1884. His body was returned to Fond du Lac and interred at Fond du Lac's Rienzi Cemetery.

== Personal life and family ==
Henry H. Conklin was the second of eight children born to Henry Conklin and his wife Mary Anne (née Hewitt). The elder Henry Conklin was a successful businessman in Poughkeepsie, New York; he served several terms in the New York State Assembly, representing Dutchess County, he was a colonel in the New York state militia, and was described as a friend of Cornelius Vanderbilt; in Wisconsin, Henry Conklin held several local offices and served several years on the Fond du Lac County board of supervisors. The Conklins were descendants of the colonist Ananias Conklin, who settled in Long Island with his brother, John, about 1639.

Three of Henry H. Conklin's younger brothers, Edgar Conklin, James Tallmadge Conklin, and William Davies Conklin, served as officers in the Union Army during the American Civil War. Edgar was also a member of the Wisconsin State Assembly for two terms. James earned an honorary brevet to the rank of brigadier general and later served as the first chief of police of the city of Fond du Lac. William, after the war, became a respected lawyer and Fond du Lac County judge.

On August 13, 1846, Henry H. Conklin married Catherine Dean Strong at Rutland, Vermont. Catherine Strong was the sister of the prominent Wisconsin pioneer Moses M. Strong. Henry and Catherine had 9 children together, though at least five died in childhood. Catherine died in 1868, and Henry never remarried.

Political offices
New city government	Mayor of Sheboygan, Wisconsin; April 1853 – August 1853	Succeeded by Francis R. Townsend (interim); Joseph F. Kirkland (elected)
