= Henry Conklin =

American politician (1787–1867)

Chairman of the Board of Supervisors of Fond du Lac County, Wisconsin
- In office January 1855 – January 1856
- Preceded by: Peter V. Sang
- Succeeded by: N. M. Donaldson

Member of the New York State Assembly from the Dutchess County district
- In office 1833, 1834, 1839, 1840
Assembly terms
In office
January 1, 1840 – January 1, 1841
Serving with Amos Bryan & Daniel Toffey
In office
January 1, 1839 – January 1, 1840
Serving with Jacob Sisson & Daniel Toffey
In office
January 1, 1834 – January 1, 1835
Serving with Theodore V. W. Anthony, William H. Bostwick, & James Mabbett
In office
January 1, 1833 – January 1, 1834
Serving with Daniel D. Aiken, Joel Brown, & George Lambert

27th Village President of Poughkeepsie, New York
- In office 1831–1833
- Preceded by: Walter Cunningham
- Succeeded by: George P. Oakley

Personal details
- Born: April 10, 1787 Poughkeepsie, New York, U.S.
- Died: April 4, 1867 (aged 79) Fond du Lac, Wisconsin, U.S.
- Resting place: Rienzi Cemetery, Fond du Lac
- Party: Republican; Whig (1838–1854); Jacksonian (1828–1838); Democratic-Republican (before 1828)
- Spouse: Mary Anne Hewitt (m. 1818–1867)
- Children: Robert Conklin^{(b. 1815; died 1872)}; Henry Hewitt Conklin^{(b. 1819; died 1884)}; Edgar Conklin^{(b. 1822; died 1873)}; Eliza Mary (Moore)^{(b. 1827; died 1903)}; James Tallmadge Conklin^{(b. 1829; died 1872)}; William Davies Conklin^{(b. 1831; died 1897)}; Frances Hewitt Conklin^{(b. 1833; died 1905)}; Theodore Franklin Conklin^{(b. 1833; died 1912)}

Military service
- Allegiance: United States
- Branch/service: New York militia
- Years of service: 1810s & 1820s
- Rank: Colonel

Henry Conklin (April 10, 1787 – April 4, 1867) was an American merchant, politician, and Wisconsin pioneer. He was one of the first American settlers at what is now Fond du Lac County, Wisconsin, and served several local offices in the Fond du Lac area. Before moving to Wisconsin, he served four terms in the New York State Assembly (1833, 1834, 1839, 1840) and held the rank of colonel in the New York militia. Conklin was originally a Jacksonian Democrat, but became a member of the Whig Party shortly after that party was created in the mid 1830s, and then joined the Republican Party when that party emerged in the 1850s.

He had several notable children, including Henry H. Conklin, the first mayor of Sheboygan, Wisconsin, Edgar Conklin, who served as a Wisconsin state legislator, and James Tallmadge Conklin, who was the first police chief of Fond du Lac and received an honorary brevet to the rank of brigadier general for his service in the Civil War.

== Biography ==
Henry Conklin was born into a prosperous merchant family in Dutchess County, New York. He was raised in the Poughkeepsie area and received a common school education. He became a successful merchant in Poughkeepsie, opening his store about 1816. In 1824, he was designated as a trustee for constructing docks at Poughkeepsie's main street. He afterward took an ownership in the docks and did extensive business in shipping and forwarding. In 1826, he became invested in a river steamboat company, in partnership with other prominent Poughkeepsie citizens Thomas J. Oakley, James Hooker, William Davies, Matthew Vassar, and brothers James Tallmadge Jr. and Nathaniel P. Tallmadge. Through that venture, he became invested in river steamboat transportation on the Hudson River, and expanded into whaling ships and supporting infrastructure. His interests then expanded into iron mining and refining, producing pig iron for sale to manufacturers.

As a prominent citizen in Poughkeepsie, Conklin became involved in politics as a member of the Democratic-Republican Party, and served several years as a village trustee. He became a supporter of Andrew Jackson in the late 1820s, and began identifying with Jacksonian democracy. Conklin was also active in the New York militia from at least 1816, and by the mid-1820s held the rank of colonel in the militia.

In 1831, Conklin was elected village president of Poughkeepsie; he was re-elected in 1832. In the fall of 1832, the Jacksonian convention in Dutchess County nominated Conklin along with three others in their slate for New York State Assembly. The Jacksonian slate was elected, and Conklin went on to serve in the 56th New York State Legislature. He was re-elected the following year.

Conklin did not run for a third term in 1834, and instead became an incorporator and investor in a Poughkeepsie–Connecticut railroad project, the Poughkeepsie Farmers' and Manufacturers' Bank, and the Dutchess County Academy.

Conklin's fortune was mostly lost in the financial crashes of the Panic of 1837, and he began selling off his assets. During that time, Conklin also became disillusioned with the Jacksonian Democratic Party under President Martin Van Buren, and began to associate with the new Whig Party, pushing for repeal of some of the Van Buren economic policies which he believed had caused the economic crisis. Conklin was elected to two more terms in the state Assembly, running on the Whig Party ticket in 1838 and 1839.

Ultimately Conklin decided to seek new opportunities in the western states. He spent the summer of 1841 prospecting in the Wisconsin Territory, and in the fall of that year brought his family and the remains of his fortune to the area that is now Fond du Lac County, Wisconsin. At the time, this meant a trip by boat from Buffalo, New York, to Green Bay, Wisconsin, and then trekking up the Fox River to Lake Winnebago, and going by boat to the southern shore of the lake.

Conklin purchased extensive tracts of land in what is now the towns of Empire, Byron, and Oakfield. With the help of his sons, they cleared land for farming and, in 1843, erected the first log cabin in what is now Fond du Lac County, Wisconsin. With his sons, he also drove the a herd of cattle north from Illinois to establish the first operational dairy farm in the Fond du Lac area, and drove a flock of sheep from Ohio to sell to new farmers arriving in the area. They also constructed the first dairy churns and grist mill in the vicinity of Fond du Lac. With James Duane Doty, Conklin constructed the first schoolhouse in the county, and Conklin's third son, Edgar, became the first teacher.

In the Wisconsin Territory, Conklin remained active in politics as a Whig. He served on the county board of supervisors in 1842, 1853, 1854, 1855, and 1856, and was chairman of the county board in 1855. Conklin was the Whig Party nominee for Wisconsin Senate in the 4th Senate district at Wisconsin's first election under state government, in May 1848. But he was defeated in the election by Warren Chase. When the Whig party dissolved into the Republican Party in 1854, Conklin became a member of that party. In 1855, Conklin was the Republican nominee for Wisconsin State Assembly in Fond du Lac County's 3rd district, but lost the general election to Isaac Brown.

Conklin largely retired from politics and public affairs after 1856, and settled in a home in the city of Fond du Lac. He suffered from poor health for more than a decade, and died on April 4, 1867.

== Personal life and family ==
Henry Conklin was the third of eight children born to Nathan Conklin and his wife Amy Copener (née Mulford). Nathan Conklin had come to Poughkeepsie about 1781 from Long Island, and often served as moderator of town meetings; he was a veteran of the American Revolutionary War and held the rank of major in the New York militia. The Conklins were descendants of the colonist Ananias Conklin, who settled in Long Island with his brother, John, about 1639.

Henry Conklin married Mary Anne Hewitt on May 26, 1818, at New York City. They had eight children, all of whom survived him—a rare occurrence in that era. Several of the Conklin children went on to notable careers:

- Robert Conklin married a niece of Nathaniel P. Tallmadge, and served as postmaster at Peebles, Wisconsin.
- Henry H. Conklin was one of the earliest settlers at Sheboygan, Wisconsin, and became the first mayor of the city.
- Edgar Conklin served two terms in the Wisconsin State Assembly, and served briefly as an officer in the Union Army.
- Eliza Mary Conklin married Benjamin Franklin Moore, another notable early Fond du Lac settler.
- William Davies Conklin served as a Union Army officer in the Civil War, then became a prominent lawyer and judge in Fond du Lac.
- James Tallmadge Conklin was a quartermaster in the Union Army, and rose to hold important logistics roles in the Army of the Tennessee, earning a brevet to the rank of brigadier general; after the war he became the first police chief of Fond du Lac.
