= Herman Schroeder =

American politician

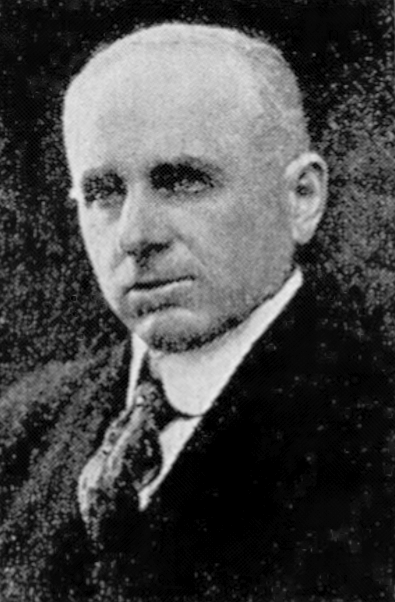

Herman Schroeder was a member of the Wisconsin State Assembly.

== Biography ==
Schroeder was born in Milwaukee, Wisconsin in July 1868, sources have differed on the exact date. Later that year, he moved with his parents to Fond du Lac County, Wisconsin. There, he became a farmer. In 1893, Schroeder married Wilhelmina Neumann. They had four children. Schroeder was sentenced to prison in 1930 because of counterfeiting.

== Political career ==
Schroeder was elected to the Assembly in 1916 and 1918. Other positions he held include treasurer of Empire, Wisconsin. He was a Republican.
