= Texas A&M International University =

Public university in Laredo, Texas, US

Coordinates: 27.5727°N 99.4353°W

- Other name: TAMIU
- Former names: Texas A&I University at Laredo (1969–1977); Laredo State University (1977–1993)
- Type: Public University
- Established: 1970; 56 years ago
- Parent institution: Texas A&M University System
- Academic affiliations: CONAHEC
- President: Christopher Maynard
- Faculty: 192 full-time (fall 2011)
- Students: 9,137 (fall 2025)
- Location: Laredo, Texas, United States
- Campus: 300 acres (1.2 km^{2})
- Colors: Maroon, Silver, Gold
- Nickname: Dustdevils
- Mascot: Dusty the Dustdevil
- Website: www.tamiu.edu

Texas A&M International University (TAMIU) is a public university in Laredo, Texas. It is part of the Texas A&M University System and home to over 8,500 students each academic semester. TAMIU offers over 70 undergraduate and graduate degrees in four colleges.

== History ==
- 1970: Established as a branch of Texas A&I University at Kingsville, and named Texas A&I University at Laredo, functioning as an upper-level University for juniors, seniors, and graduate students. The Senate bill was introduced by Wayne Connally, brother of Governor John B. Connally, Jr.
- 1977: University's name changes to Laredo State University.
- 1989: University joins The Texas A&M University System.
- 1993: Name changes to Texas A&M International University.
- 1995: An unsuccessful attempt is made to transfer TAMIU to the University of Texas System. TAMIU becomes a four-year university, welcomes its first freshman class and opens its new campus, the first new University campus constructed in Texas in over 25 years.
- 2004: Doctoral program in International Business Administration is launched.
- 2006: Early College High School joins TAMIU (in collaboration with Laredo Independent School District).
- 2009: 40th Anniversary Celebration (2009–2010) begins.
- 2010: Dedicates Autism Interventions Center.
- 2010: Dedicates new University Success Center.
- 2011: Dining Center Expansion in Student Center opens.
- 2012: With the approval of The Texas A&M University System Board of Regents, the University Success Center is renamed the Senator Judith Zaffirini Student Success Center. Formal dedication ceremonies are scheduled in September 2012.
- 2014: Enabled by legislation authored by State Senator Judith Zaffirini and approved by the 79th Texas Legislature in 2005, the University announced its historic launch of a University-level academy on its campus for highly gifted and motivated high school seniors, to be known thereafter as The Texas Academy of International and Science, Technology, Engineering and Math (STEM) Studies.

== Academics ==
Undergraduate demographics as of Fall 2023
Race and ethnicity	Total
Hispanic	92%
International student	5%
White	2%
Black	1%
Economic diversity
Low-income (Note: The percentage of students who received an income-based federal Pell grant intended for low-income students.)	68%
Affluent (Note: The percentage of students who are a part of the American middle class at the bare minimum.)	32%

Texas A&M International University offers undergraduate and graduate degrees through four colleges. They include:

- College of Arts and Sciences
- A. R. Sanchez, Jr. School of Business
- College of Education
- College of Nursing and Health Sciences

=== Research ===
TAMIU is home to various research centers, including the Binational Center, Center for the Study of Western Hemispheric Trade, The Western Hemispheric Trade Information Center, the Texas Center for Border Economics and Enterprise Development, the Small Business Development Center, and the Center for Earth and Environmental Studies.

== Athletics ==
The Texas A&M International (TAMIU) athletic teams are called the Dustdevils. The university is a member of the Division II level of the National Collegiate Athletic Association (NCAA), primarily competing in the Lone Star Conference (LSC) since the 2019–20 academic year. The Dustdevils previously competed in the D-II Heartland Conference from 2006–07 to 2018–19 and in the Red River Athletic Conference (RRAC) of the National Association of Intercollegiate Athletics (NAIA) from 2002–03 to 2005–06.

TAMIU competes in 13 intercollegiate varsity sports: Men's sports included baseball, basketball, cross country, golf and soccer; while women's sports include basketball, cross country, golf, soccer, softball and volleyball; and co-ed sports include cheerleading and dance.

=== Move to NCAA Division II ===
The Dustdevils became active members of NCAA Division II on September 1, 2008. As an active member, TAMIU is eligible for conference championships and NCAA tournament berths.

=== Rebranding ===
In August 2014, the Dustdevil Athletics Department launched a new team logo and marks for the NCAA Division II programs.

=== Accomplishments ===
- Men's basketball (2010 and 2013 Heartland Conference Tournament Championship)
- Women's basketball (2013 Heartland Conference Champions)
- Men's soccer (2003 Red River Athletic Conference Champions, 2010 Heartland Conference Title)
- Women's volleyball (2002 West Division Athletics Conference Champions)
- Softball (2010 Heartland Conference Tournament Championship)

== Notable alumni ==
- Esther Buckley, member of the United States Commission on Civil Rights, 1983-1992; Laredo educator
- Henry Cuellar, member of the United States House of Representatives since 2005
- Rodney Lewis, oil and natural gas industrialist
- Juan Perez, Wisconsin politician

== Notable faculty ==
- Ned Kock, information systems professor and human evolution theorist
- Jerry D. Thompson, historian and award-winning author of multiple books on the American Southwest

== Gallery ==
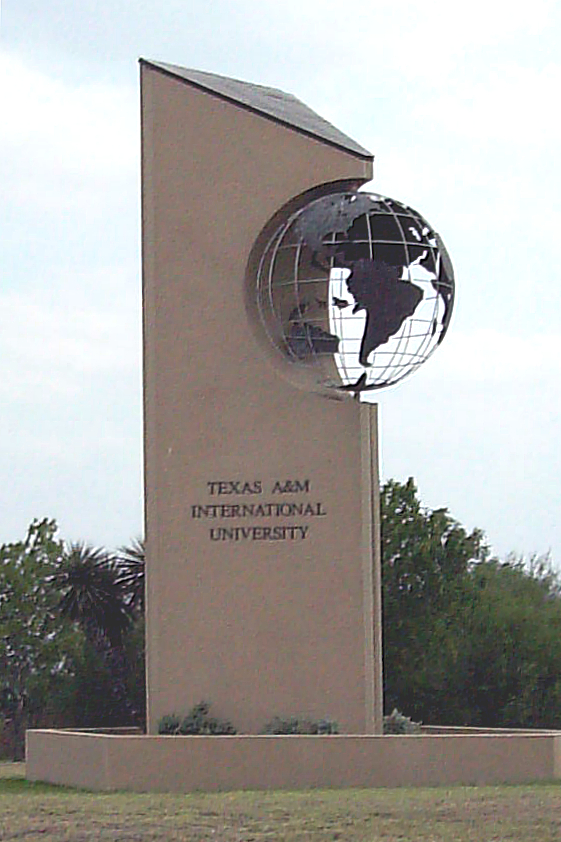
TAMIU entrance sign

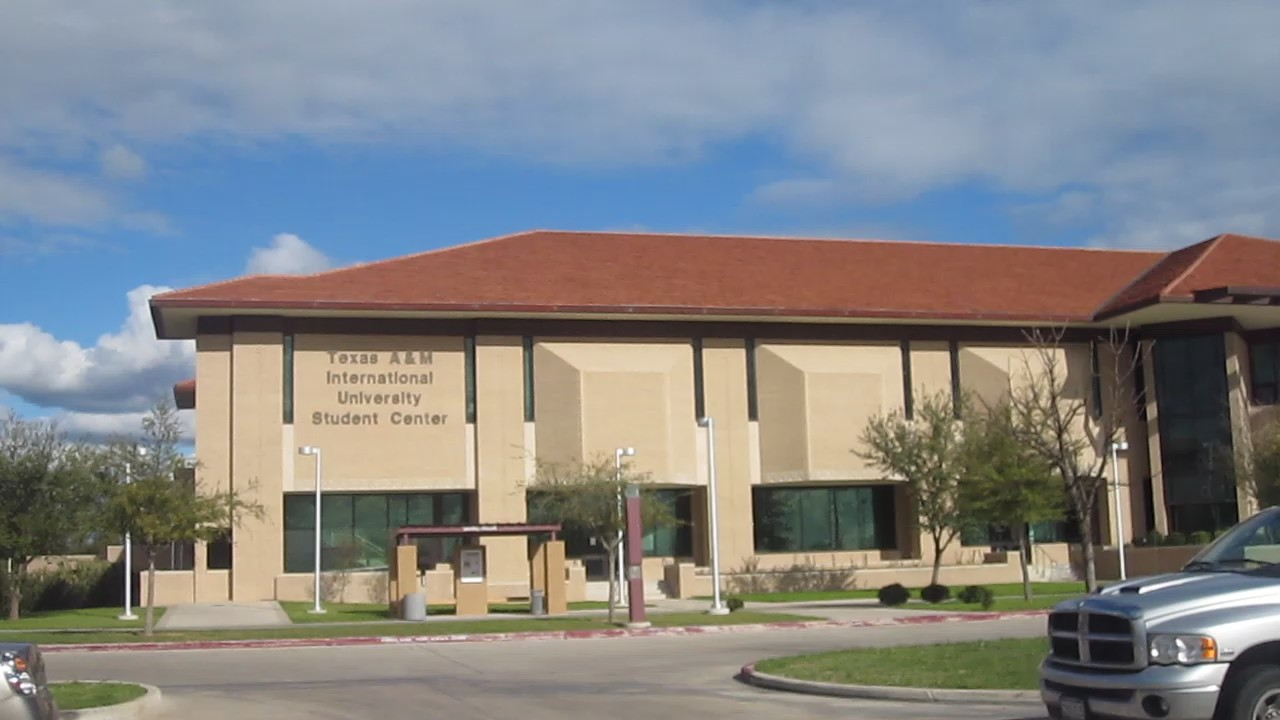
TAMIU Student Center

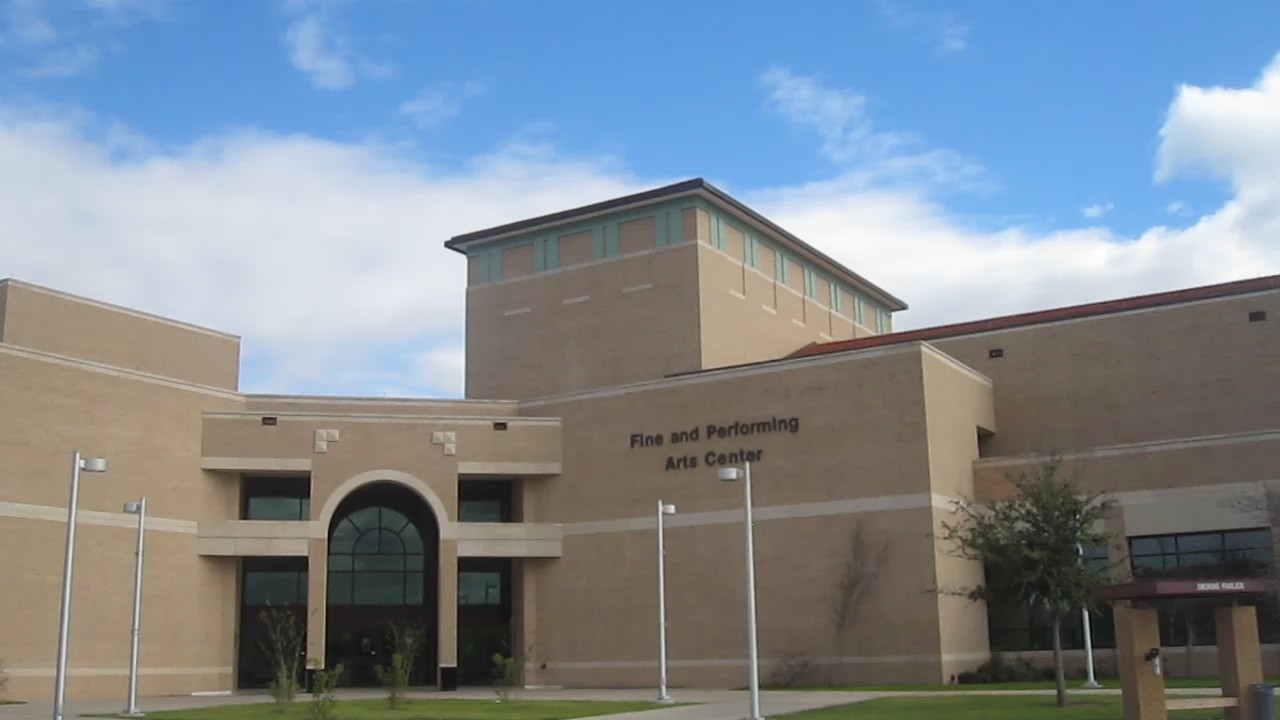
TAMIU Center for the Fine and Performing Arts

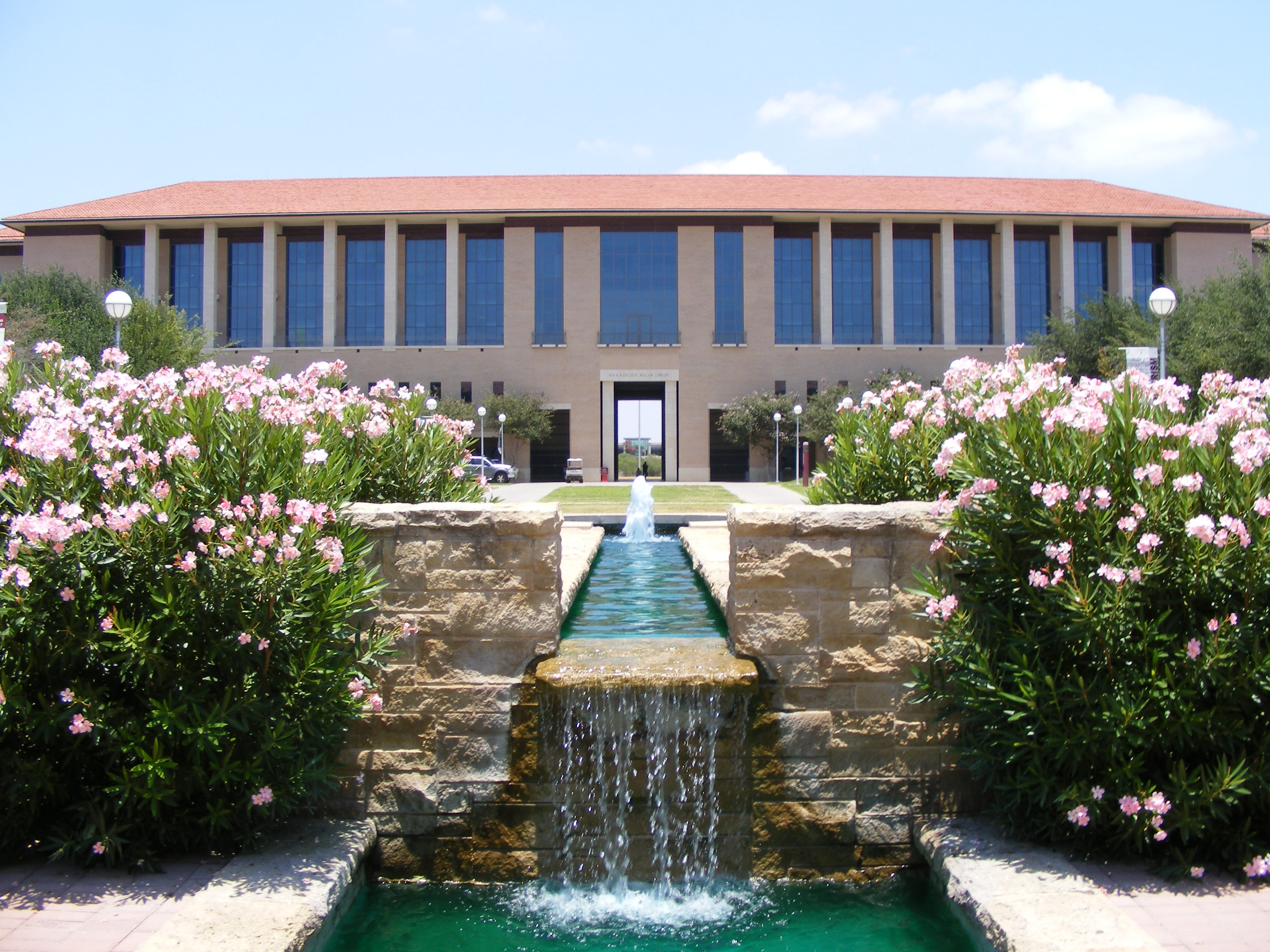
TAMIU fountain is a homage to the acequia.

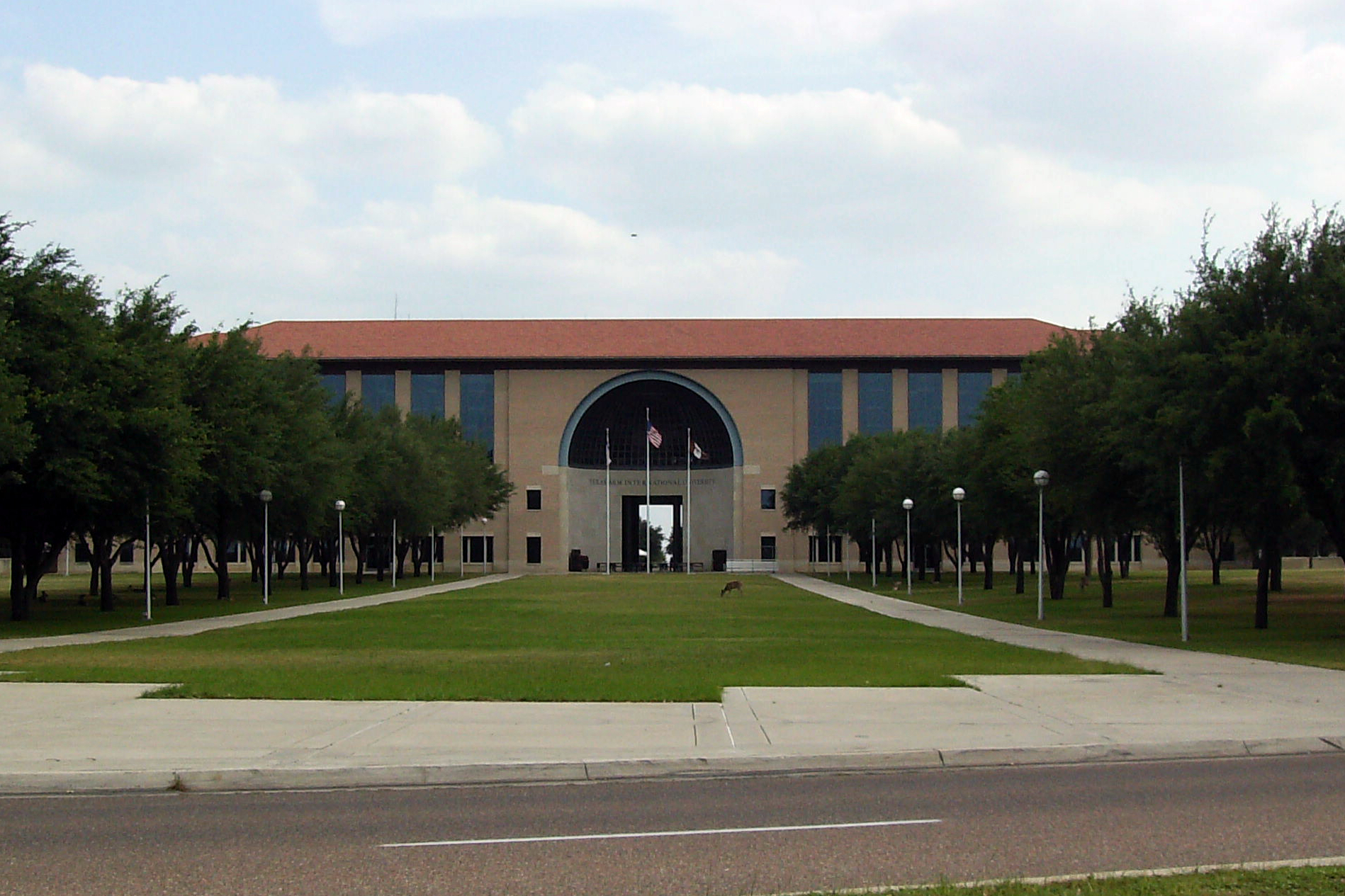
Texas A&M International University's Sue and Radcliffe Killam Library

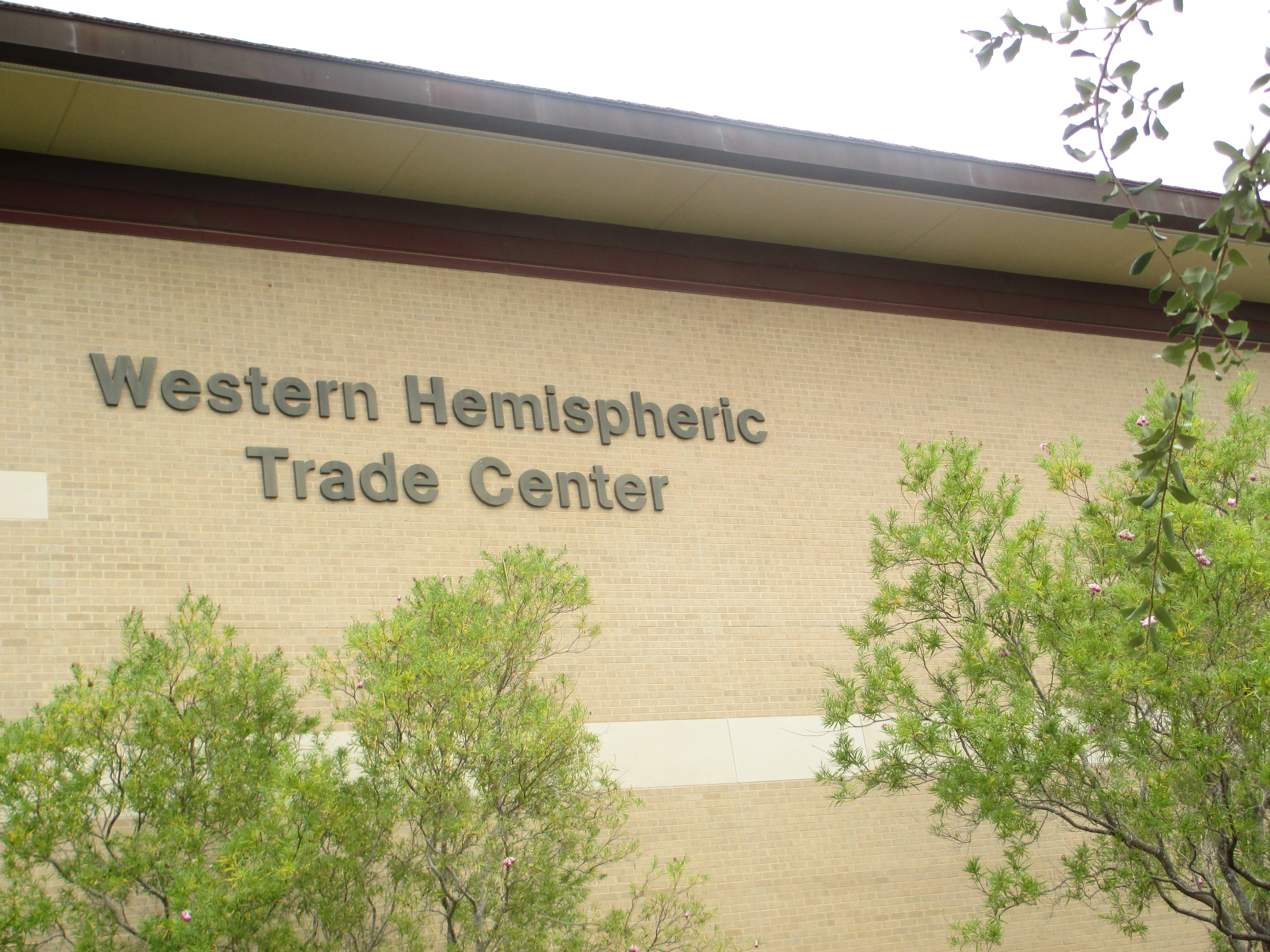
Western Hemispheric Trade Center at TAMIU

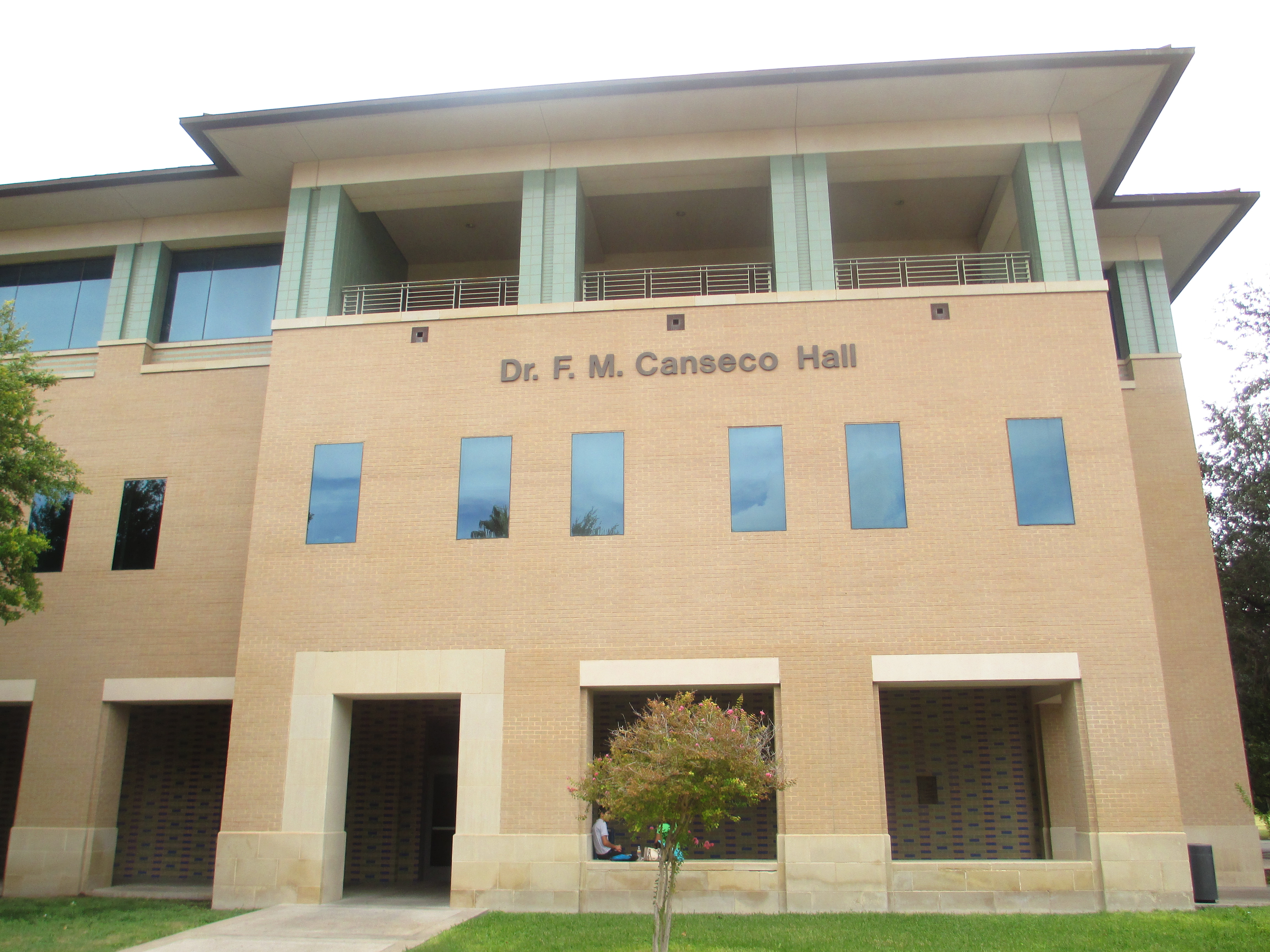
Dr. F. M. Canseco Hall

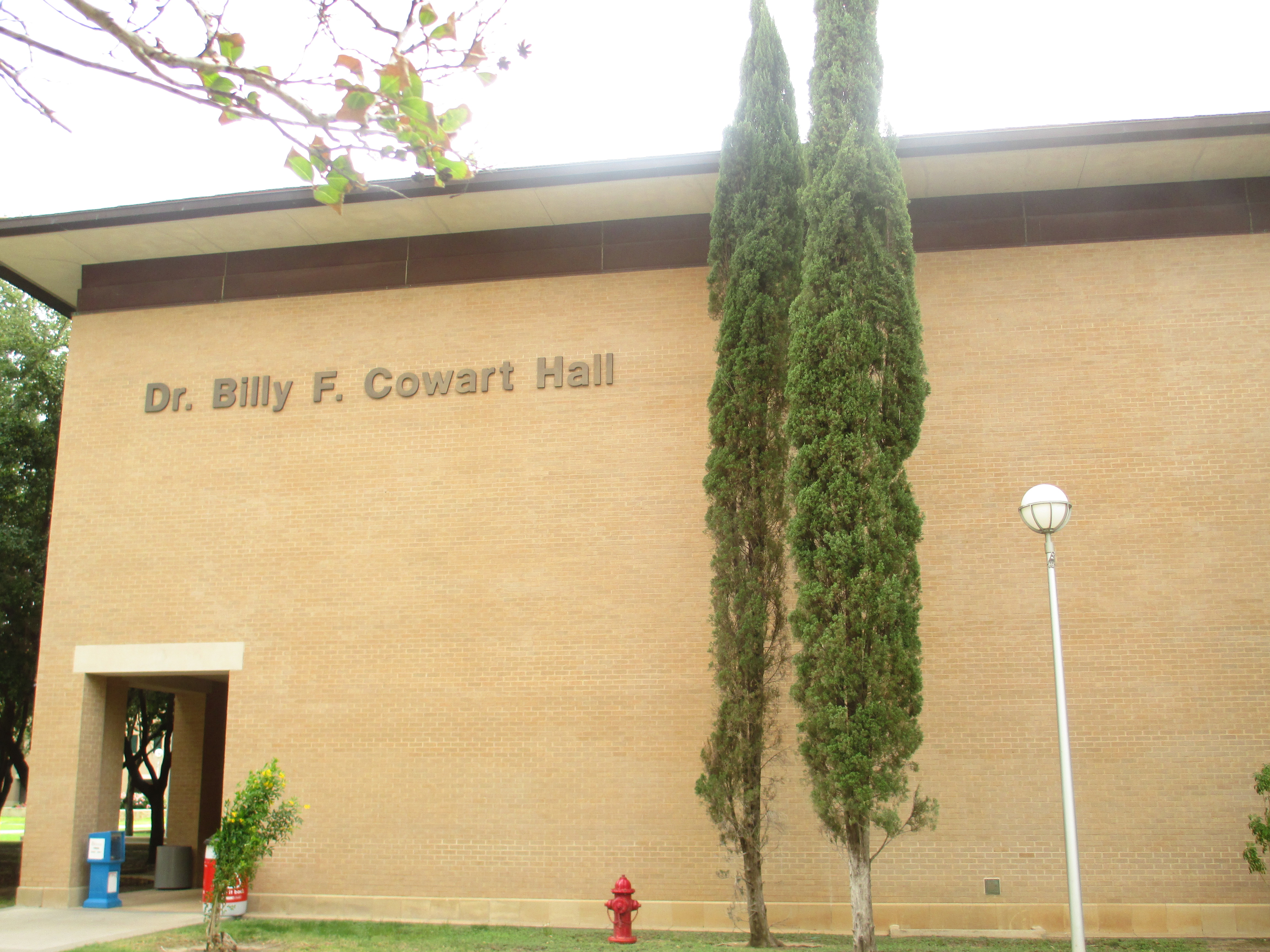
Dr. Billy F. Cowart Hall is named for the former president Billy Cowart, who headed the institution from 1969 to 1985

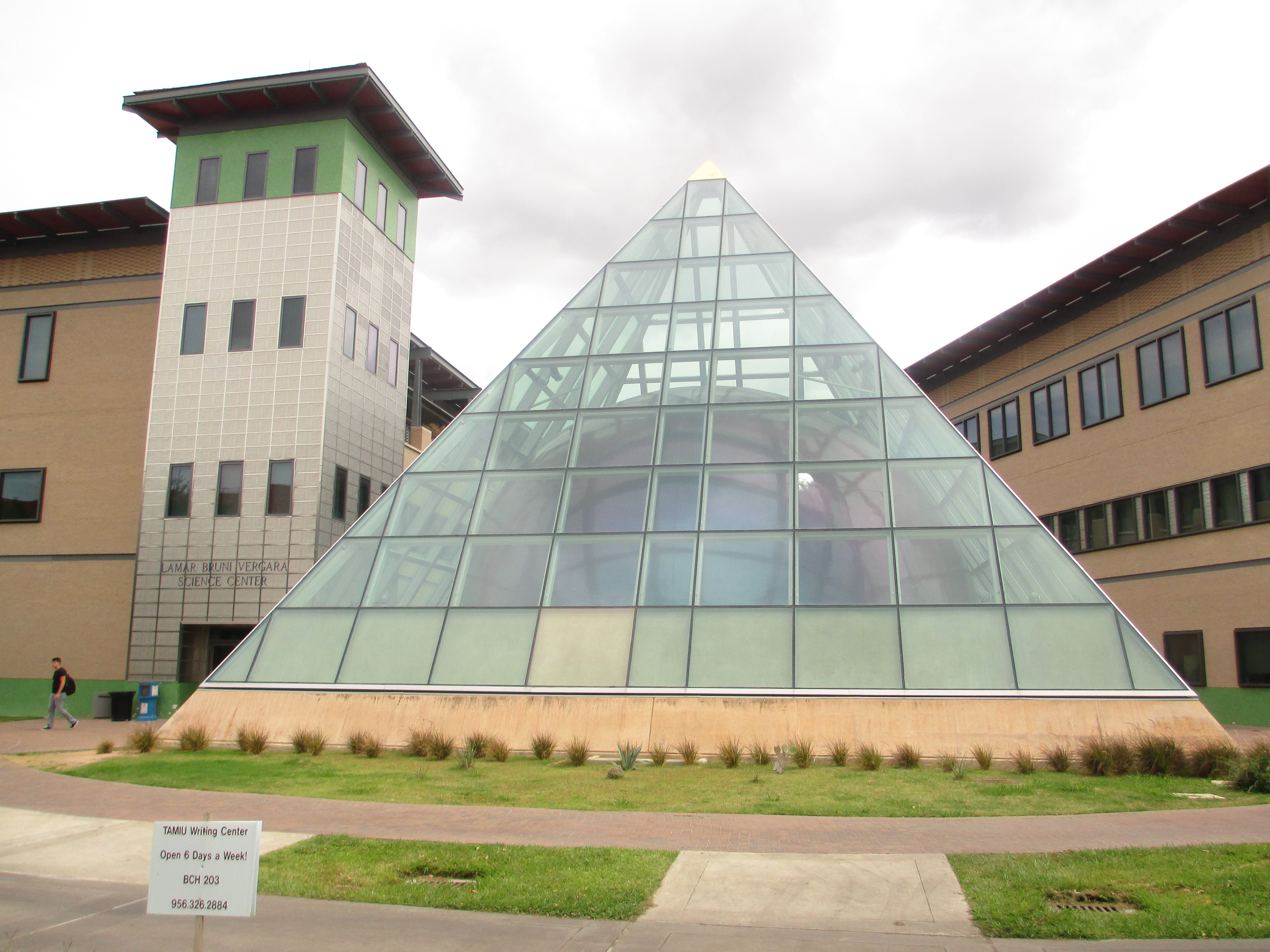
The Lamar Bruni Vergara Science Center and Planetarium

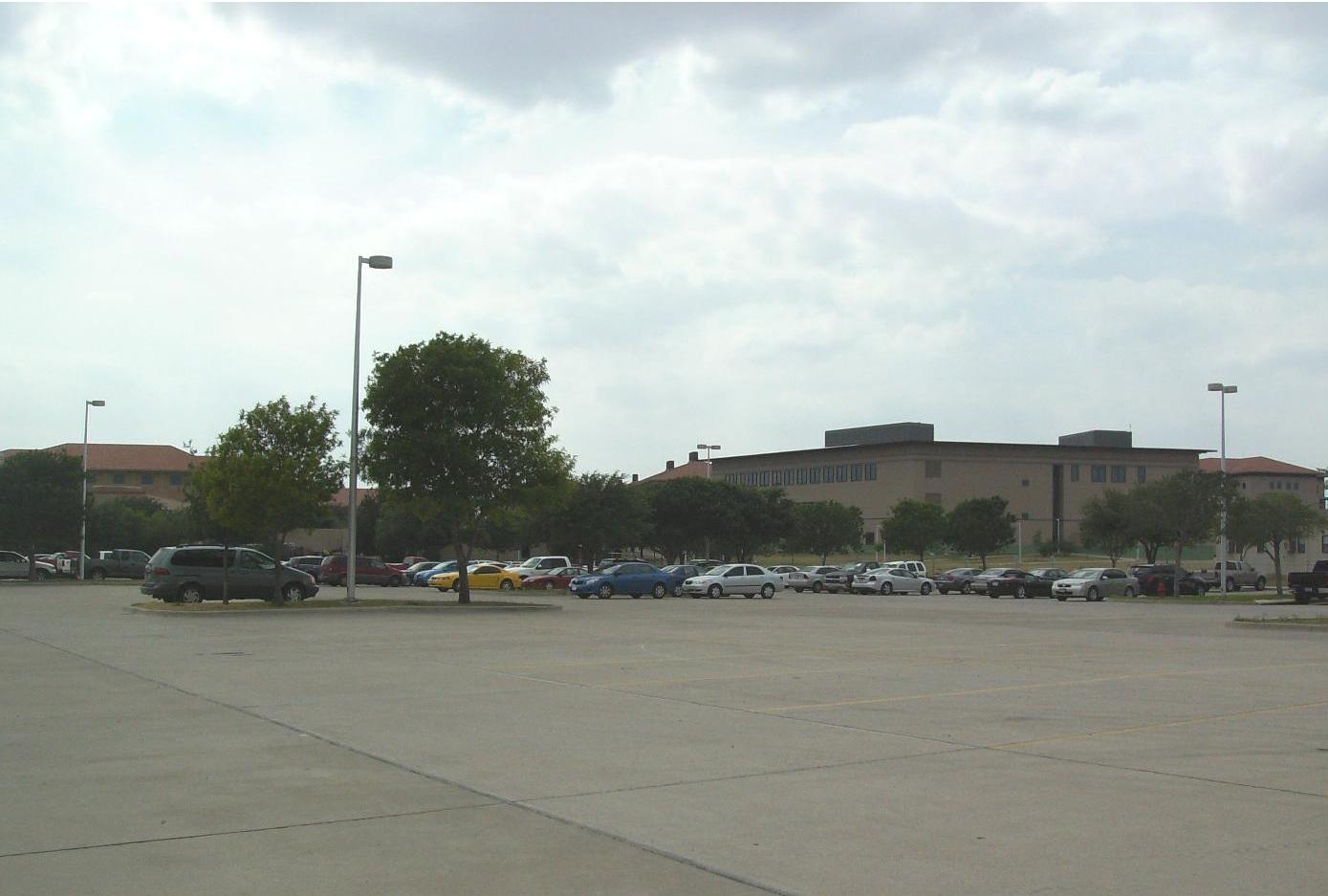
Lamar Bruni Vergara Science Center

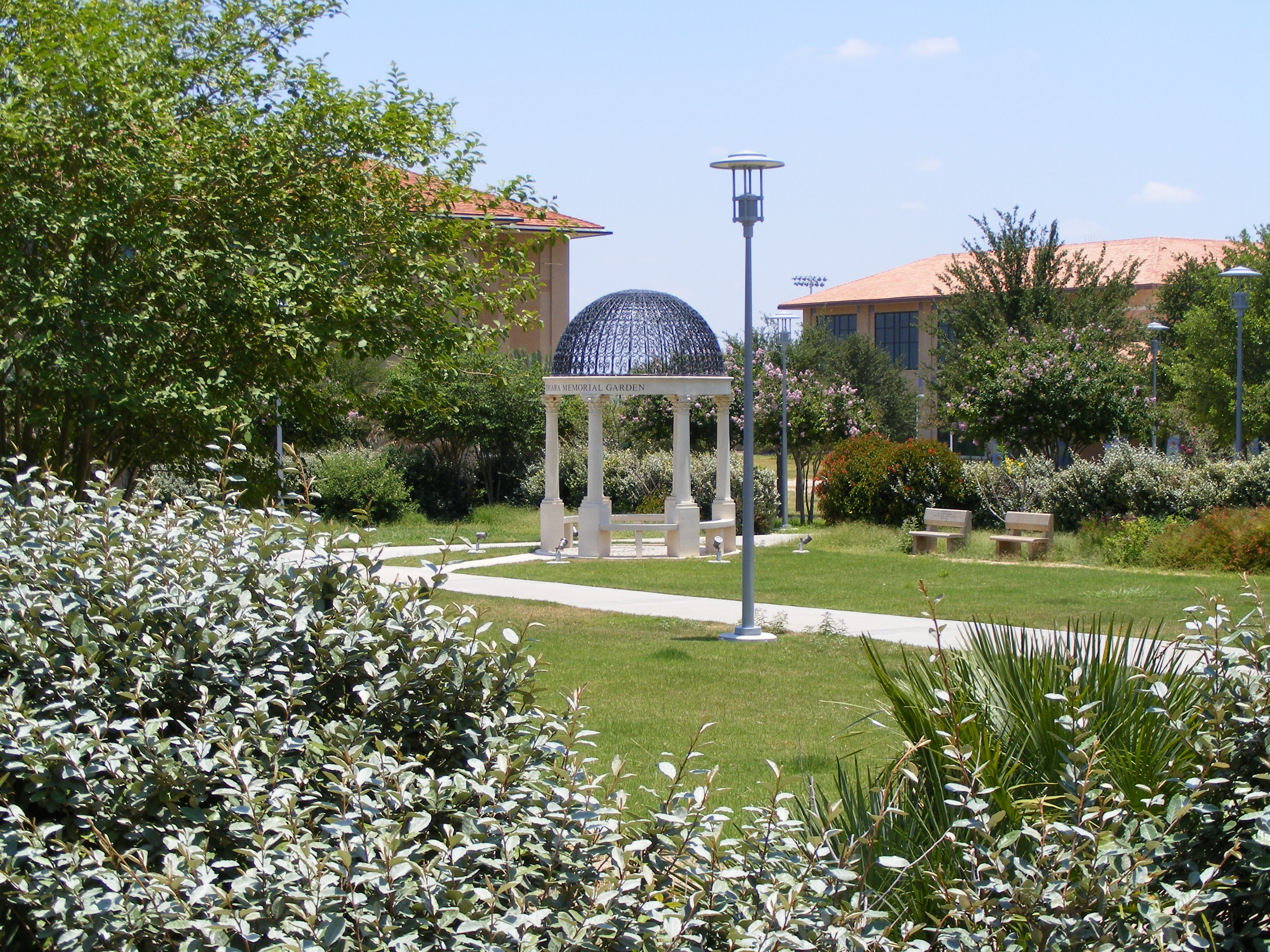
TAMIU Lamar Bruni Vergara Memorial Garden

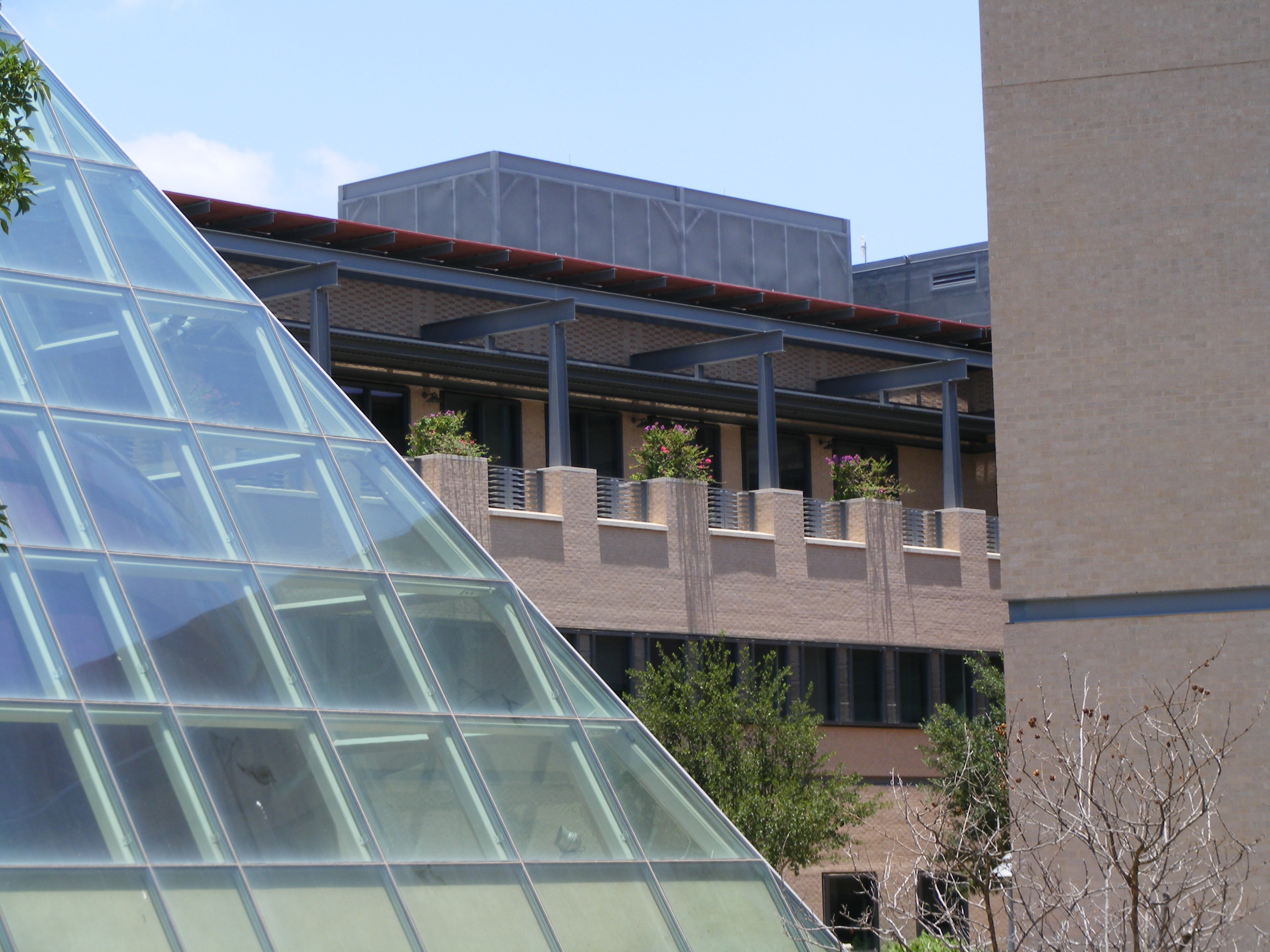
Lamar Bruni Vergara Science Center
