= Winooski, Wisconsin =

- Ghost town
- Location within Wisconsin
- Coordinates: 43°42′25″N 87°59′2″W
- Country: United States
- State: Wisconsin
- County: Sheboygan

Population (2000)
  - Total: 1
  - Density: 2.6/sq mi (1/km^{2})

Winooski was a hamlet in the Town of Lyndon in Sheboygan County, Wisconsin, United States, at 43° 42.423′ N, 87° 59.039′ W. It was named after Winooski, Vermont, home of James and Lucinda Stone, who were the town's first settlers in 1846.

== History ==
Winooski as of 1875 had its own post office and village hall. Businesses included saw and grist mills, a cheese factory, and a general store, as well as a cooper, a blacksmith, and a woodworking shop. There were perhaps a dozen houses in the settlement proper.

== Notable people ==
- Otto B. Joerns, Wisconsin State Assemblyman, mayor of Sheboygan, Wisconsin, and businessman, was born in Winooski.
- Abolitionist hero Capt. Jonathan K. Walker, "The Man With The Branded Hand," lived in Winooski.
