= Edgar Conklin =

American politician and pioneer (1822-1873)

Member of the Wisconsin State Assembly from the Brown County district
- In office January 5, 1857 – January 3, 1859
- Preceded by: John Day
- Succeeded by: William Field Jr.

Register of Deeds of Fond du Lac County, Wisconsin
- In office January 1, 1847 – January 1, 1848
- Preceded by: S. S. N. Fuller
- Succeeded by: Nelson Wood

Personal details
- Born: 1822 Dutchess County, New York, U.S.
- Died: May 22, 1873 (aged 50–51) Chippewa County, Wisconsin, U.S.
- Cause of death: Typhoid fever
- Resting place: Woodlawn Cemetery, Allouez, Wisconsin
- Party: Democratic
- Spouses: Mary Elizabeth Mitchell (m. 1850; died 1855); Harriet Theresa Mitchell (m. 1856–1873)
- Children: with Mary Mitchell; Otto Conklin^{(b. 1853)}; with Harriet Mitchell; Helen Louise (Darby)^{(b. 1856; died 1933)}; Edgar Moore Conklin^{(b. 1858; died 1932)}; Sophia Augusta Conklin^{(b. 1865; died 1928)}; Charles Conklin^{(b. 1868)}
- Parent: Henry Conklin (father)
- Relatives: Henry H. Conklin (brother); James Tallmadge Conklin (brother)

Military service
- Allegiance: United States
- Branch/service: United States Volunteers; Union Army
- Years of service: 1862–1863
- Rank: Captain, USV
- Unit: 21st Reg. Wis. Vol. Infantry
- Battles/wars: American Civil War

Edgar Conklin (1822 – May 22, 1873) was an American businessman, politician, and Wisconsin pioneer. He served two terms in the Wisconsin State Assembly, representing Brown County during the 1857 and 1858 terms. With his father, Henry Conklin, he was one of the first American settlers in what is now Fond du Lac County, Wisconsin.

== Biography ==
Edgar Conklin was born into a wealthy family in Dutchess County, New York, in 1822. He was raised and educated in Dutchess County. The family businesses suffered significantly from the Panic of 1837, and his father, Henry Conklin, decided to sell their properties in New York to seek new opportunities in the western territories. Conklin, then a young man, traveled with his family to the Wisconsin Territory in 1841. His father bought extensive tracts of land in what is now the towns of Empire, Byron, and Oakfield. Edgar, having received a good education in New York, became the first school teacher in the area of Fond du Lac in 1842.

With his father and brothers, they cleared land for farming and, in 1843, erected the first log cabin in what is now Fond du Lac County, Wisconsin. They also constructed the first grist mill in the vicinity of Fond du Lac, and—after purchasing and driving a herd cattle north from Illinois—established the first operational dairy farm in the Fond du Lac area.

Conklin and his father were active in the Whig Party. In 1846, Conklin was elected register of deeds of Fond du Lac County, while his father was serving as probate judge. In March 1848, he was elected to the board of trustees for the then-village of Fond du Lac, in the second election held under the village government.

Conklin moved to Green Bay, Wisconsin, when he was appointed receiver of the U.S. land office at Green Bay in April 1849; he an appointee of the new Whig president Zachary Taylor. Conklin continued working for the land office through the presidency of Millard Fillmore. After the election of Democratic president Franklin Pierce, the land office was moved to the city of Menasha, Wisconsin; Conklin was retained as receiver for a year at Menasha after stating that he voted for Pierce in the 1852 election.

An act of the Wisconsin Legislature in 1852 named Conklin as an incorporator of the Taycheedah and Green Bay Plank Road Company, along with a number of other prominent citizens, including former Wisconsin Territory governors James Duane Doty and Nathaniel P. Tallmadge. The following term, Conklin was named as an incorporator of the Association for the Improvement of the Fox and Wisconsin Rivers, after the organization of the company, Conklin was chosen as treasurer. In 1854, he was also listed as an incorporator of the Green Bay, De Pere, and Madison Railroad Company, and a vice president of the Northern Bank in Green Bay.

After the bulk of the Whig Party dissolved into the new Republican Party, Conklin was one of a number of prominent Wisconsin Whigs who instead joined the Democratic Party. In the fall of 1856, Conklin was the Democratic Party nominee for Wisconsin State Assembly in Brown County. In the general election, he defeated Republican nominee James Henry Howe and went on to serve in the 10th Wisconsin Legislature. He was renominated in 1857 and won a second term, defeating Republican B. J. Brown. Conklin did not run for re-election in 1858.

In 1859, Conklin joined the Pike's Peak gold rush, traveling to Colorado with significant equipment and a gang of employees. Correspondence in 1860 indicated that he was finding some success at gold extraction.

After the outbreak of the American Civil War, Conklin returned to Fond du Lac County. He was commissioned as a captain and authorized to recruit volunteers for the 21st Wisconsin Infantry Regiment. He quickly filled his quota and his company was enrolled in the regiment as Company F. The regiment went south to Kentucky; at or around the Battle of Perryville, Conklin was taken prisoner and was paroled for prisoner exchange. He resigned a short time later, in January 1863.

After the war, he was involved with the construction of the Green Bay and Lake Pepin Railway, taking him to the western parts of the state. Conklin died of Typhoid fever while working in Chippewa Falls, Wisconsin, on May 22, 1873.

== Personal life and family ==
Edgar Conklin was the third of eight children born to Henry Conklin and his wife Mary Anne (née Hewitt). Henry Conklin was a successful businessman in Poughkeepsie, New York; he served several terms in the New York State Assembly, representing Dutchess County, he was a colonel in the New York state militia, and was described as a friend of Cornelius Vanderbilt; in Wisconsin, Henry Conklin held several local offices and served several years on the Fond du Lac County board of supervisors. The Conklins were descendants of the colonist Ananias Conklin, who settled in Long Island with his brother, John, about 1639.

Two of Edgar's younger brothers, James Tallmadge Conklin and William Davies Conklin, also served as officers in the Union Army. James earned an honorary brevet to the rank of brigadier general and later served as the first chief of police of the city of Fond du Lac. William, after the war, became a respected lawyer and Fond du Lac County judge.

One of Edgar's elder brothers was Henry H. Conklin, one of the founders of Sheboygan, Wisconsin, and the first mayor of that city.

Edgar Conklin married twice, both times to daughters of William B. Mitchell. His first wife was Elizabeth Mary, they married in 1850 and had one son before Elizabeth's death in 1855. A year after his first wife's death, Conklin married Elizabeth's younger sister, Harriet Theresa, and had four more children.
