= Theodore Dieckmann =

American politician and businessman (1853–1919)

32nd Mayor of Sheboygan, Wisconsin
- In office April 1905 – April 1915
- Preceded by: Charles A. Born
- Succeeded by: Otto B. Joerns

Member of the Wisconsin State Assembly from the Sheboygan 1st district
- In office January 2, 1893 – January 7, 1895
- Preceded by: Dennis T. Phalen
- Succeeded by: Christian Ackerman

Personal details
- Born: November 6, 1853 New York, New York, U.S.
- Died: October 6, 1919 (aged 65) Sheboygan, Wisconsin, U.S.
- Resting place: Wildwood Cemetery, Sheboygan
- Party: Democratic
- Spouse: Mary Oberreich (m. 1878–1919)
- Children: Etta (Wolters)^{(b. 1882; died 1967)}; Laura Louisa (Jacobsen)^{(b. 1884; died 1937)}; Theodore Gerhard Dieckmann^{(b. 1885; died 1957)}; Lenore Marie (Bachausen)^{(b. 1887; died 1963)}; Gertrude Margaretha Ida Dieckmann^{(b. 1891; died 1894)}; Infant Dieckmann^{(b. 1893; died 1893)}
- Occupation: Merchant

Theodore Dieckmann (November 6, 1853 – October 6, 1919) was an American businessman and Democratic politician. He was the 32nd mayor of Sheboygan, Wisconsin, (1905–1915) and represented Sheboygan for one term (1893) in the Wisconsin State Assembly.

== Biography ==
Dieckmann was born in New York City in 1853. As a child, he moved to Sheboygan, Wisconsin, with his parents in 1858. Dieckmann owned a jewelry business in Sheboygan, Wisconsin. He served on the Sheboygan Common Council and was mayor of the city. In 1893, Dieckmann served in the Wisconsin State Assembly and was a Democrat. Dieckmann died at his home in Sheboygan, Wisconsin.

== See also ==
- List of mayors of Sheboygan, Wisconsin

Wisconsin State Assembly
| Preceded by Dennis T. Phalen | Member of the Wisconsin State Assembly from the Sheboygan 1st district January 2, 1893 – January 7, 1895 | Succeeded by Christian Ackerman |
Political offices
| Preceded by Charles A. Born | Mayor of Sheboygan, Wisconsin; April 1905 – April 1915 | Succeeded by Otto B. Joerns |
