= Otto B. Joerns =

American politician (1864–1917)

Otto Joerns

33rd Mayor of Sheboygan, Wisconsin
- In office April 20, 1915 – April 1917
- Preceded by: Theodore Dieckmann
- Succeeded by: Herman F. Albrecht

Member of the Wisconsin State Assembly from the Sheboygan 1st district
- In office January 2, 1911 – January 6, 1913
- Preceded by: Edward J. Kempf
- Succeeded by: Carl Zillier

Personal details
- Born: March 13, 1864 Winooski, Wisconsin, U.S.
- Died: September 15, 1917 (aged 53) Denver, Colorado, U.S.
- Resting place: Winooski Cemetery, Plymouth, Wisconsin
- Party: Democratic
- Spouse: Lila Rhoda Wood (m. 1888–1917)
- Children: Oliver Wood Joerns^{(b. 1892; died 1954)}; Helen Ester (Foulkes)^{(b. 1894; died 1946)}
- Education: Valparaiso University (BS)
- Profession: Civil engineer

Otto B. Joerns (March 13, 1864 – September 15, 1917) was an American civil engineer, businessman, and Democratic politician. He was the 33rd mayor of Sheboygan, Wisconsin (1915–1917) and represented Sheboygan for one term in the Wisconsin State Assembly (1911). In historical documents, his last name is sometimes spelled Joerens.

== Early life and education ==
Born in Winooski, Wisconsin, Joerns graduated from Plymouth High School in Plymouth, Wisconsin. He received his bachelor's degree in civil engineering from Valparaiso University in 1886.

== Career ==
In 1905, Joerns became the owner of Joerns Furniture Company in Sheboygan, Wisconsin. He served as surveyor of Sheboygan County. Joerns also served as treasurer of the school board. He also served as assessor and mayor of Sheboygan, Wisconsin. Joerns also served on the library board and on the Sheboygan Police and Fire Commission. In 1911, Joerns served in the Wisconsin State Assembly as a Democrat.

In 1916, Joerns' furniture plant in Sheboygan was destroyed by fire. In April 1917, Joerns and his family moved to Stevens Point, Wisconsin, where the company had another furniture plant.

== Death ==
Joerns died suddenly in Denver, Colorado, where he had gone for medical treatment because of ill health.

== See also ==
- List of mayors of Sheboygan, Wisconsin

Wisconsin State Assembly
Preceded by Edward J. Kempf	Member of the Wisconsin State Assembly from the Sheboygan 1st district January 2, 1911 – January 6, 1913	Succeeded by Carl Zillier
Political offices
Preceded by Theodore Dieckmann	Mayor of Sheboygan, Wisconsin; April 1915 – April 1917	Succeeded by Herman F. Albrecht
