= Philip Conkling =

American nonprofit executive

Philip W. Conkling
- Born: August 2
- Education: Harvard, Yale School of Forestry
- Occupations: Founder of the Island Institute, Author
- Children: 4 Sons, and 1 Step-Son

Philip Wheeler Conkling is the founder and former president of the Island Institute, a membership-based nonprofit organization located in Rockland, Maine that serves as a voice for the balanced future of the islands and waters of the Gulf of Maine, especially the 15 year-round island communities along the Maine coast. Conkling also serves as an alternate commissioner of the Roosevelt Campobello International Park, and is on the Maine state board of the Conservation Law Foundation. He lives in the small coastal town of Camden, Maine.

== Early life and education ==
Conkling completed his B.A. from Harvard University in 1970. He completed his M.F.S. at the Yale School of Forestry and Environmental Studies in 1976.

Conkling was awarded an honorary degree from the Bowdoin College in 2013.

== Career ==
Conkling founded the non-profit Island Institute in 1983 to preserve the islands of Maine with Peter Ralston. He founded Island Journal.

Conkling is an Advisory Council member of the Conservation Law Foundation. He is a board member of the Fox Island Wind. He is the President of Philip Conkling & Associates, based in Camden, Maine.

== Bibliography ==
- The Fate of Greenland: Lessons from Abrupt Climate Change (2011) co-authored with Richard Alley, Wallace Broecker and George Denton, with photographs by Gary Comer MIT Press
- Lobsters Great and Small-How Fishermen and Scientists are Changing Our Understanding of a Maine Icon (2001)
- From Cape Cod to the Bay of Fundy-An Environmental Atlas of the Gulf of Maine (1995).
- Islands in Time, A Natural and Cultural History of the Islands of the Gulf of Maine (published first in 1981, revised in 1999, with a new, expanded edition published in 2011)
- Green Islands Green Sea: A Guide to Foraging on the Islands of Maine (1980)
- "Along the Archipelago "

== See also ==
- Greenland ice sheet
