= Juan Perez (American politician) =

American politician (born 1956)

52nd Mayor of Sheboygan, Wisconsin
- In office April 19, 2005 – April 20, 2009
- Preceded by: James Schramm
- Succeeded by: Bob Ryan

Member of the Sheboygan Common Council from the 2nd district
- In office 2001–2005
- Succeeded by: Bob Ryan

Personal details
- Born: 1956 (age 69–70) Carrizo Springs, Texas, U.S.
- Spouse: Sylvia Perez
- Children: Cibi, Rigo, Ethan
- Education: Texas A&M International University; University of Wisconsin Law School
- Profession: Businessman, politician

Juan Perez (born 1956) is an American lawyer and municipal politician. He was the 52nd mayor of Sheboygan, Wisconsin, from 2005 to 2009, and was the first Latino mayor in Wisconsin.

== Early life and education ==
Perez was born in Carrizo Springs, Texas. He and wife, Sylvia, first moved to Sheboygan in 1984 before to Madison.

Perez earned a J.D. degree from University of Wisconsin Law School in 1988 and returned to Texas to work as a law clerk in the Travis County District Attorney's Office. After failing the Texas State Bar, he left the attorney's office. He also earned a Bachelor of Arts degree from Texas A&M International University in Laredo, Texas with a major in English and a minor in political science.

Before being elected mayor, Perez worked at the University of Wisconsin–Sheboygan as an academic advisor.

== Political career ==
=== Sheboygan Board of Education ===
In November 1999, Perez was appointed to the Sheboygan Area School District Board of Education. With his appointment to the board, Perez became the first minority to hold office in Sheboygan County. After being elected mayor in 2005, Perez resigned from the Board of Education.

=== Sheboygan City Council ===
In 2001, Perez was elected by alderman to fill an open City Council seat with then-Mayor James Schramm casting a tie-breaking vote. He would continue serving the Sheboygan Board of Education while an alderman and won re-election to the City Council in 2002 and 2004.

=== Mayor of Sheboygan ===
In November 2004, Perez announced his candidacy for mayor of Sheboygan and would challenge two-time incumbent Mayor James Schramm.

Perez served one term in the office, as he was unable to advance in the February 18, 2009 primary election against two other candidates. Alderman Bob Ryan won the later April 7 general election and succeeded him in office on April 20, 2009.

==== Failed recall effort ====
Perez was the subject of a failed recall in mid-2006, which was coordinated by the Sheboygan branch of Citizens for Responsible Government. The recall effort had a racial tone to their recall effort but the group claimed that Perez "fail(ed) to uphold his mayoral duties in office with integrity and professionalism," based on his successful efforts to move the location of the city's new police headquarters from a local park to a site on the city's west side, and an aborted merge of the Sheboygan Police Department and 911 center into the Sheboygan County Sheriff's Office, along with issues regarding coverage of the city from local radio station WHBL and the city's decision to market tourism through their own city division rather than through the Sheboygan County Chamber of Commerce. 6,000 signatures were needed, but supposedly only 4,013 of the signatures required, were collected. None of the signatures were ever confirmed or verified.

=== Wisconsin State Assembly ===
Perez challenged incumbent State Rep. Terry Van Akkeren in the 26th District Democratic primary. Perez lost the primary election with 523 votes to Van Akkeren's 2,147 votes.

== Political positions ==
In 2014, Perez publicly supported Terry Katsma during his first run for the Wisconsin State Assembly. He also publicly supported Glenn Grothman for Wisconsin's 6th congressional district in 2014 Republican primary.

Perez was a dues-paying member of the Republican Party of Sheboygan County in 2017, 2015 and 2014.
