= Bob Ryan (mayor) =

American politician (1963–2021)

53rd Mayor of Sheboygan, Wisconsin
- In office April 20, 2009 – March 5, 2012
- Preceded by: Juan Perez
- Succeeded by: Terry Van Akkeren

Member of the Sheboygan Common Council from the 2nd district
- In office 2006–2009
- Preceded by: Juan Perez

Personal details
- Born: Robert Ryan; May 28, 1963 Harvey, Illinois, U.S.
- Died: July 1, 2021 (aged 58) Sheboygan, Wisconsin, U.S.
- Profession: Businessman, politician

Robert "Bob" Ryan (May 28, 1963 – July 1, 2021) was an American businessman and municipal politician. He was the 53rd mayor of Sheboygan, Wisconsin. He was elected in 2009 but recalled from office in 2012, before the end of his four-year term.

== Life and career ==
Prior to being elected mayor, Ryan served on the city's Common Council for three years as District Two's alderperson, and operated Ryan Oil, which operated BP service stations in the county before the sale of those stations to Quality State Oil in mid-2007.

Ryan died on July 1, 2021, at the age of 58.

== Mayor of Sheboygan ==
Ryan and State Representative Terry Van Akkeren challenged incumbent Juan Perez in the 2009 mayoral election. Ryan ran as a critic of Sheboygan's "political environment". After Perez was eliminated in the primary election he endorsed Ryan. Ryan defeated Van Akkeren 5,891 to 3,968 in the general election.

Ryan started his four-year term in April 2009. He annexed land for a future business center along I-43 near the University of Wisconsin–Sheboygan/Sheboygan Area Lutheran High School campus that was named "Willow Creek Park." Ryan worked with city's Director of Development and Planning to form the Sheboygan Market District to promote regional foods. During his term, PCBs were removed from the lower Sheboygan River. In February 2011, the city annexed 180 further acres of former farmland along its western border with Kohler for development.

== Controversy and scandals ==
=== Sexual harassment lawsuit ===
In December 2009, former City of Sheboygan Human Resources Director Angela Payne filed a complaint with the Equal Rights Division of the Wisconsin Department of Workforce Development alleging sexual harassment and racial discrimination. She alleged that on July 9, 2009, Ryan attempted to kiss her and made sexual advances. On August 6, Ryan fired Payne for what he called "unsatisfactory services". She had been recently hired by previous mayor Juan Perez and was in her probationary period during which the mayor could fire her without permission of the city council. Ryan said the firing was the result of numerous department heads approaching him, detailing Payne's shortcomings in a meeting and asking that she be terminated.

An equal rights officer with the Department of Workforce Development who investigated the complaint found Payne's allegations of sexual harassment credible, recommending a formal hearing before an administrative law judge. The investigator dismissed the claim of racial discrimination. A cash settlement in the case was announced in August 2011.

=== Elkhart Lake incident ===
On July 26, 2011, The Sheboygan Press reported that on July 23 Ryan got into a physical altercation in Elkhart Lake with someone who confronted him for drinking. A few days later, Ryan admitted he was getting treatment for alcoholism. Ryan pleaded guilty in February 2013 for groping a woman in a bar. In September 2011, the city Common Council voted to hire two attorneys to remove Ryan from office.

=== January 2012 recall election ===
In August 2011, residents organized a February 2012 recall election, gathering enough petition signatures to force a ballot. Ryan did not appeal the petition and was automatically entered as a candidate in the election against him, with seven other candidates. Ryan received the most votes (33%) in the primary and entered the general election against former state representative Terry Van Akkeren (26%). On February 21, 2012, Van Akkeren defeated Ryan (53% to 47%) in the recall election. Ryan was recalled from office on March 5, 2012.

=== March 2013 arrest ===
On March 3, 2013, Ryan was arrested for drunk driving near Kiel. While being transported to the Manitowoc County Jail, he commented that he wished the female Manitowoc police officer had arrested him, stating she was "hot" and "smoking". Ryan was charged with an OWI after his blood alcohol level was tested; it was his first citation for drunk driving. He reached a plea agreement of a lesser charge of operating with a prohibited alcohol concentration in July 2013; he received a fine and had his driver's license revoked for eight months.
