= James Tallmadge Conklin =

Union Army officer

James T. Conklin

1st Chief of Police of Fond du Lac, Wisconsin
- In office 1867–1869
- Preceded by: Position established
- Succeeded by: James O'Connel

Personal details
- Born: March 4, 1829 Poughkeepsie, New York, U.S.
- Died: December 31, 1893 (aged 64) Fond du Lac, Wisconsin, U.S.
- Resting place: Forest Home Cemetery, Milwaukee, Wisconsin
- Spouse: Catharine E. Bonesteel (m. 1855; died 1888)
- Parent: Henry Conklin (father)
- Relatives: Edgar Conklin (brother)

Military service
- Allegiance: United States
- Branch/service: United States Volunteers; Union Army
- Rank: Captain, USV; Brevet Brig. General, USV
- Unit: 14th Reg. Wis. Vol. Infantry; XVII Corps; Army of the Tennessee
- Battles/wars: American Civil War

James Tallmadge Conklin (March 4, 1829 – December 31, 1893) was an American farmer, mill operator, and Wisconsin pioneer. With his family, he was one of the earliest American settlers in what is now Fond du Lac County, Wisconsin, and served as the first chief of police for the city of Fond du Lac. During the American Civil War, he served as assistant quartermaster for the Union Army XVII Corps and later in the same capacity for the Army of the Tennessee; he earned an honorary brevet to the rank of brigadier general.

== Early life ==
James Conklin was born into a wealthy family in Dutchess County, New York, in 1829. The family businesses suffered significantly from the Panic of 1837, and his father, Henry Conklin, decided to sell their properties in New York to seek new opportunities in the western territories. Conklin, then about 12 years old, traveled with his family to the Wisconsin Territory in 1841. His father bought extensive tracts of land in what is now the towns of Empire, Byron, and Oakfield. James' elder brother, Edgar—who had received a good education in New York—became the first school teacher in the area of Fond du Lac in 1842.

With his father and brothers, they cleared land for farming and, in 1843, erected the first log cabin in what is now Fond du Lac County, Wisconsin. They also constructed the first grist mill in the vicinity of Fond du Lac, and—after purchasing and driving a herd cattle north from Illinois—established the first operational dairy farm in the Fond du Lac area.

James Conklin made his first bid for elected office in 1857, running for Fond du Lac treasurer on a "people's ticket"—opposing the normal Democratic Party ticket. The Democratic ticket prevailed, however, and Conklin was not elected. He was a candidate for sheriff at the Republican Party county convention in 1860, but lost the nomination to George F. Wheeler.

== Civil War service ==
After the outbreak of the American Civil War, Conklin became involved in the volunteer militia company "Bragg's Rifles", and was elected first lieutenant under company captain and namesake Edward S. Bragg. That company was incorporated into the 6th Wisconsin Infantry Regiment, but Conklin resigned just before the regiment mustered into federal service, in July 1861. Instead, Conklin joined the nascent organization of the 14th Wisconsin Infantry Regiment under Fond du Lac Republican politician David E. Wood; Conklin was commissioned as regimental quartermaster.

The 14th Wisconsin Infantry Regiment mustered into federal service in January 1862, and proceeded south to St. Louis, and proceeded from there into Tennessee. They were engaged in fighting and maneuvering in Tennessee throughout 1862, and were heavily engaged in both the Battle of Shiloh and the Second Battle of Corinth. Early in 1863, Conklin was detached from the regiment and assigned as an acting assistant quartermaster on the staff of General James B. McPherson, commanding XVII Corps. In July of 1863, Conklin was formally promoted to assistant quartermaster for the corps with the rank of captain. With XVII Corps, he joined the Atlanta campaign and Sherman's march to the sea.

After McPherson was promoted to command the Army of the Tennessee, Conklin remained with the XVII Corps staff and was promoted to corps quartermaster; he later transferred to the staff of the Army of the Tennessee as assistant quartermaster. He served in that capacity through the end of the war, serving at depots in Mobile, Alabama, and Nashville, Tennessee, until mustering out November 8, 1865. His obituary described him as a friend of Walter Q. Gresham, who had served as a division commander in XVII Corps during this time.

Conklin was nominated for an honorary brevet to the rank of brigadier general on January 13, 1866, retroactive to March 13, 1865. The brevet was confirmed by the U.S. Senate on March 12, 1866.

== Postbellum years ==
Prior to 1866, peace enforcement in Fond du Lac was administered by a city marshal. In 1866, the police department was established, along with the office of chief of police. Conklin was selected as the first chief of police, serving two one-year terms.

He was considered a candidate for federal appointment as United States marshal for Wisconsin after Grant's election in 1868, but did not receive the appointment.

== Personal life and family ==
James T. Conklin was the sixth of eight children born to Henry Conklin and his wife Mary Anne (née Hewitt). Henry Conklin was a successful businessman in Poughkeepsie, New York; he served several terms in the New York State Assembly, representing Dutchess County, he was a colonel in the New York state militia, and was described as a friend of Cornelius Vanderbilt; in Wisconsin, Henry Conklin held several local offices and served several years on the Fond du Lac County board of supervisors. The Conklins were descendants of the colonist Ananias Conklin, who settled in Long Island with his brother, John, about 1639.

Two of James' brothers, Edgar Conklin and William Davies Conklin, also served as officers in the Union Army. Edgar also served as a member of the Wisconsin State Assembly from Brown County. William, after the war, became a respected lawyer and Fond du Lac County judge.

James Conklin married Catharine E. "Kate" Bonesteel at Milwaukee on September 20, 1855. They were married 33 years, but had no known children; Kate died in August 1888.

James T. Conklin died on December 31, 1893; his body was interred at historic Forest Home Cemetery in Milwaukee, Wisconsin.
