= Roscoe Seely Conkling =

Deputy Attorney General for New York, US

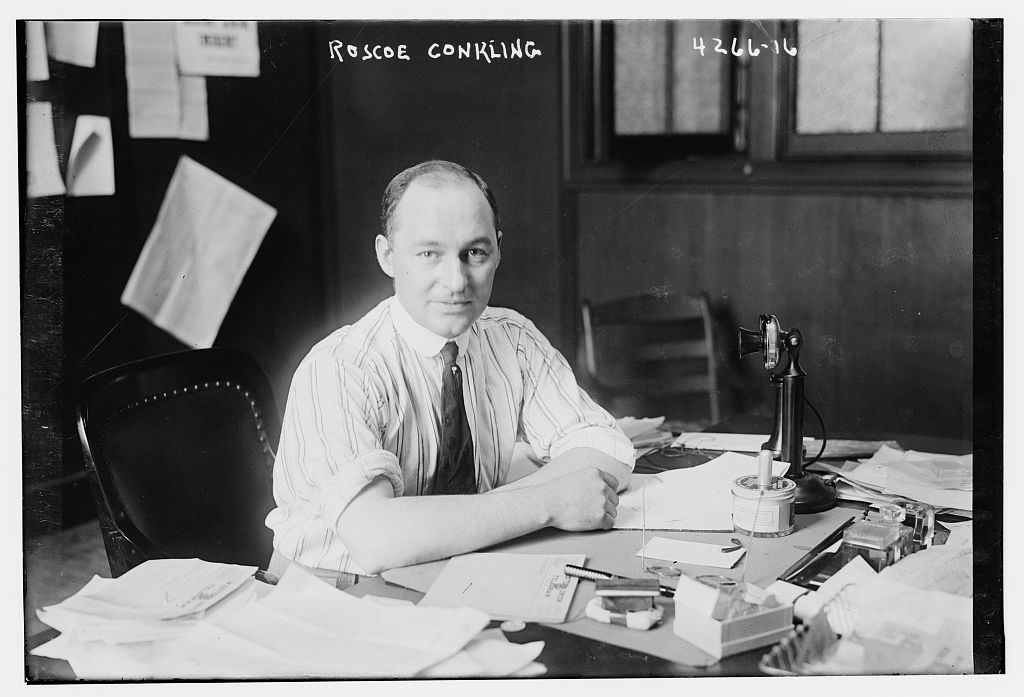
- Conkling in 1917
- Born: February 15, 1884; Paterson, New Jersey
- Died: September 14, 1956 (aged 72); Manhattan, New York City
- Education: Amherst College (1908)
- Occupation: Deputy New York Attorney General
- Spouse(s): Isabella Woodbury; Florence Clock
- Children: 3
- Parent(s): William F. Conkling; Priscilla Mason

Roscoe Seely Conkling (February 15, 1884 — September 14, 1956) was the Deputy New York Attorney General until 1919. He administered the draft laws in New York during World War I and World War II.

== Biography ==
He was born on February 15, 1884, in Paterson, New Jersey, to William F. Conkling and Priscilla Mason of Northville, New York. He graduated from Amherst College in 1908.

He was the Deputy New York Attorney General until 1919.

After a long illness, he died on the night of September 14, 1956, at his apartment in the Irving Hotel in Manhattan, New York City. He was 72 years old.
