= Larry Conklin =

American singer-songwriter

Larry Conklin is an American guitar player, singer, songwriter and music journalist. He is also an instrumental finger stylist, a slide guitarist and an interpreter of traditional blues music.

== Work ==
Conklin's first album, Jackdaw, was released independently and achieved moderate regional success with the single "River of Stories". Conklin then moved to Italy and Germany, where he released seven international CDs. During that period, while working with Tukan Records, the European journal Audio announced his release Dolphin Grace as CD of the month. His follow-up CD, The Poet's Orchestra, received similar accolades from the music journals Stereoplay and Audio.

== Life ==
During 23 years of traveling and performing throughout Europe, Conklin shared the stage with a number of artists including bluesman Memphis Slim, folk guitarist John Renbourn, Chinese harpist Xu Feng Xia, blues artist John Hammond, and beat poet Lawrence Ferlinghetti. He was the guitarist for blues singer Guitar Crusher for four years.

Conklin has also played a role in movie soundtracks including The Dolphin's Touch, from Wyke Farmer Productions, England, and numerous environmental and travel programs for German television.

He returned to the US in 2002, and released three albums on his own label, LC2 Music, Sudden Flight with partner Candy Cooper and Bittertruth. Bittersweet has been described as "songs of lost and found, with stellar performances from John Renbourn, Windham Hill bassist Michael Manring and virtuosic blues harmonica player Andreas Scherer." The album includes the tracks "The Part Time Ascetic", "Balcony of Tears" and "On the Road", Conklin's homage to his one-time neighbor Jack Kerouac, the American writer whose best-known work is the novel On the Road.

== Discography ==
- Discogs.com:
- Allmusic.com, Larry Conklin Discography:
- Discography on Amazon:
