= Edward J. Kempf =

American politician from Wisconsin (1862–1947)

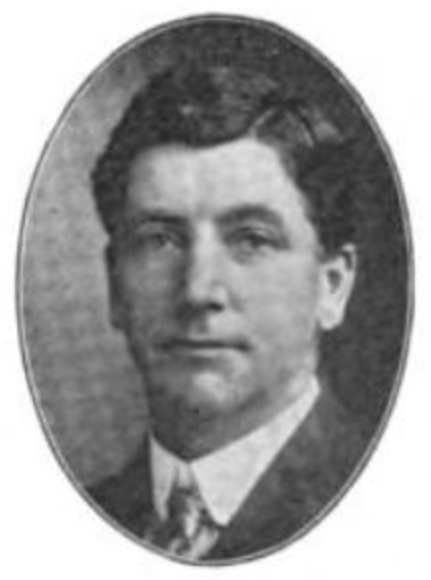

Member of the Wisconsin State Assembly
- In office 1908–1910
- Constituency: Sheboygan County First District

Personal details
- Born: February 21, 1862 Sheboygan, Wisconsin, U.S.
- Died: December 6, 1947 (aged 85) Sheboygan, Wisconsin, U.S.
- Party: Republican
- Occupation: Politician

Edward J. Kempf (February 21, 1862 – December 6, 1947) was a member of the Wisconsin State Assembly.

== Biography ==
Kempf was born on February 21, 1862, in Sheboygan, Wisconsin. He died in Sheboygan on December 6, 1947, and was buried in the Lutheran cemetery there.

== Career ==
Kempf was elected to the Assembly in 1908. He was a Republican.
