= Thomas M. Blackstock =

19th century American businessman and politician

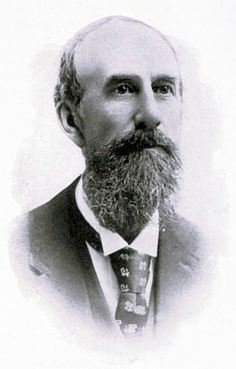

12th, 14th, & 23rd Mayor of Sheboygan, Wisconsin
- In office April 1884 – April 1885
- Preceded by: Michael Winter
- Succeeded by: James Bell
- In office April 1872 – April 1873
- Preceded by: William Elwell
- Succeeded by: James Bell
- In office April 1870 – April 1871
- Preceded by: Francis Geele
- Succeeded by: William Elwell

Member of the Wisconsin State Assembly from the Sheboygan 1st district
- In office January 4, 1869 – January 3, 1870
- Preceded by: Joseph Wedig
- Succeeded by: Charles Oetling

Personal details
- Born: January 12, 1834 County Armagh, Ulster, UK
- Died: February 27, 1913 (aged 79) Sheboygan, Wisconsin, U.S.
- Resting place: Calvary Cemetery, Sheboygan, Wisconsin
- Party: Republican
- Spouse: Bridget Denn (m. 1860–1913)
- Children: 3 adopted

Thomas M. Blackstock (January 12, 1834 – February 27, 1913) was a Scotch-Irish American immigrant, businessman, and Republican politician. He was co-founder and president of the Phoenix Chair Company in Sheboygan, Wisconsin, and served three years as mayor of Sheboygan in the 1870s and 1880s.

== Biography ==
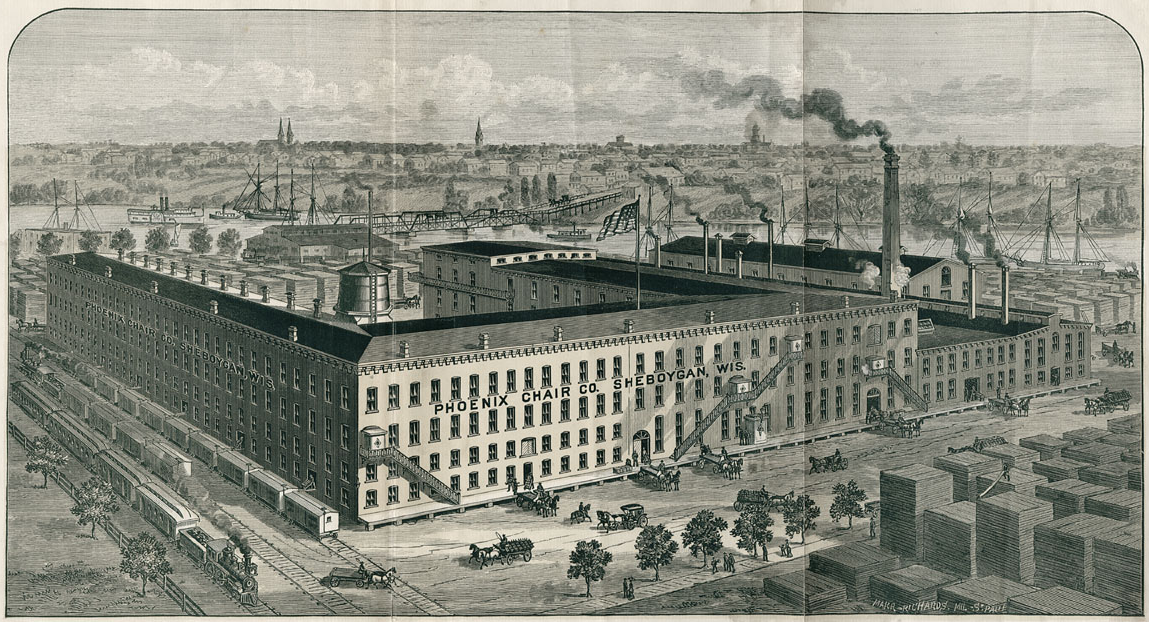
Drawing of Phoenix Chair Company Factory in 1885.

Blackstock was born in County Armagh, in what is now Northern Ireland. His father died when he was three years old. He and his sisters were left in the care of family when his mother emigrated to the United States, they followed with their aunt several years later, in 1848. They stopped briefly in Canada before arriving at Sheboygan, Wisconsin, in the Spring of 1849.

He was initially employed at a hotel, but soon went to work at Dr. J. J. Brown's drug store, where he remained until 1856. From 1856 to 1861 he was employed as superintendent of the construction of the Sheboygan & Fond du Lac Plank Road. He then purchased the drug business of Dr. Brown and operated the store for the next 15 years.

He was elected to the Wisconsin State Assembly from Sheboygan in 1868 on the Republican ticket. He also served on the Sheboygan city council and was elected mayor in 1870, 1872, and 1884.

In 1875, he became involved in the organization of the Phoenix Chair Company and was named the first secretary of the company. A year later, he was elected president and general manager of the company. He maintained a controlling interest in the company for the rest of his life.

In 1885, he organized the Sheboygan Mutual Loan, Saving, and Building Association, and served as the president of that organization until his death in 1913.

Through his business success, he came to own substantial real estate in the city and formed the South Sheboygan Land Company to manage the property.

Blackstock has always been politically affiliated with the Republican Party. He was elected as a delegate of Wisconsin to the 1892 Republican National Convention, and was prominently considered as a candidate for Governor of Wisconsin in 1894.

== Personal life and legacy ==
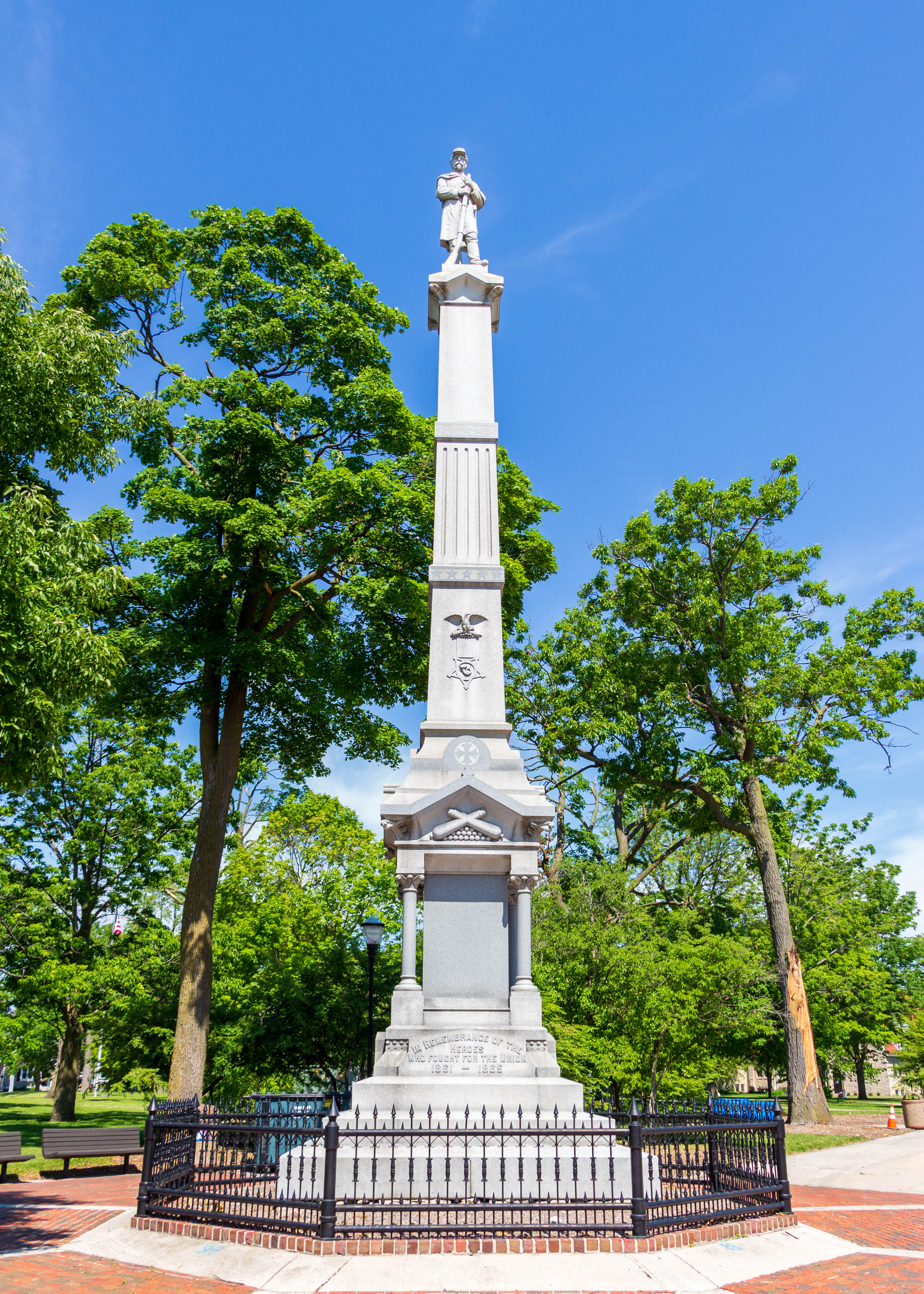
Civil War Soldiers' monument in Sheboygan.

In November 1861, Blackstock married Bridget Denn, of Waterford, Ireland. In 1882, the Blackstocks had an Italianate style home built for them on a small hilltop site in the Ellis Addition area of Sheboygan, which is now listed on U.S. National Register of Historic Places. Thomas and Bridget Blackstock were childless, but around 1890 adopted three of Bridget's brother's children, Mary, Nellie, and Annie, after the death of their mother.

Blackstock is credited with the establishment of the Civil War soldiers' monument at the southeast corner of Sheboygan's Fountain Park.

== Electoral history ==
=== U.S. House (1890) ===
Wisconsin's 5th Congressional District Election, 1890
| Party | Candidate | Votes | % | ±% |
|---|---|---|---|---|
General Election, November 4, 1890
| Democratic | George H. Brickner (incumbent) | 17,708 | 67.20% | +12.04pp |
| Republican | Thomas M. Blackstock | 8,093 | 30.71% | −10.77pp |
| Prohibition | George McKenney | 552 | 2.09% | +1.52pp |
| Plurality | | 9,615 | 36.49% | +22.82pp |
| Total votes | | 26,353 | 100.0% | -14.76% |
| Democratic hold | | | | |

== See also ==
- List of mayors of Sheboygan, Wisconsin
