= James Lafferty (Wisconsin politician) =

American politician

James Lafferty was a member of the Wisconsin State Assembly in 1874. He was a member of the Democratic Party.

Lafferty was born in Cohoes, New York on August 3, 1837. He lived in Empire, Fond du Lac County, Wisconsin.

== External files ==
https://docs.legis.wisconsin.gov/misc/lrb/blue_book/2007_2008/300_feature.pdf
