= Hilda Conkling =

American poet

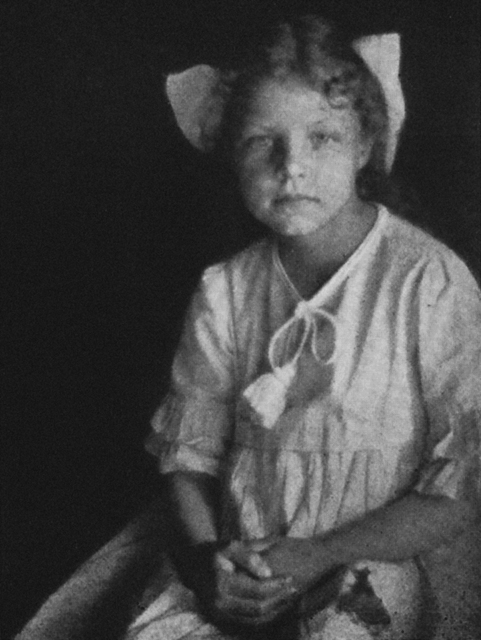
Hilda Conkling as pictured in Poems by a Little Girl

Hilda Conkling (1910–1986) was an American poet. She was the daughter of Grace Hazard Conkling, a poet in her own right and assistant professor of English at Smith College, Northampton, Massachusetts. Hilda was born in New York state. Her father died when she was four years old, and she had one sister, Elsa, two years her senior.

Hilda composed most of her poetry as a young child, between the ages of four and fourteen years old. She never wrote them down herself; instead, they came out in conversation with her mother, who would write down Hilda's words either in the moment, or from memory later. If the latter, she would read the lines back to Hilda, who would then correct any deviation from her original words. As Hilda grew up, her mother stopped recording the poems, and Hilda is not known to have written any herself as an adult.

== Poetry ==
Most of Hilda's poetry is concerned with nature; sometimes simply descriptive, sometimes mixed with elements of fantasy. Other common themes are love for her mother, stories and daydreams, and pictures or books that pleased her. Often these themes intertwine, and she often makes use of metaphor in her descriptions of plants and animals.

Three collections of Hilda's poetry were published during her life: Poems by a Little Girl (1920, preface by Amy Lowell), Shoes of the Wind (1922), and Silverhorn (1924). Her poems were also included in the anthologies Silver Pennies (1925), and Sing a Song of Popcorn: Every Child's Book of Poems (1988). Prior to her first book, she was published in a number of magazines, including Poetry: A Magazine of Verse, The Delineator, Good Housekeeping, The Lyric, St. Nicholas Magazine, and Contemporary Verse.

== Modern influence ==
Three of Hilda Conkling's poems—"Evening", "Moonsong", and "Water"—were used as the text for a choral piece called Three Nightsongs by American composer Joshua Shank.

"Water", "About My Dreams", "Snow Capped Mountain", and "The White Cloud" have been set to music by American composer J. D. Frizzell.

== See also ==
- Poetry of the United States
