= Edmund Smith Conklin =

American psychologist (1884–1942)

Edmund Smith Conklin (April 19, 1884 – October 6, 1942) was an American author and psychologist.

He was born in New Britain, Connecticut on April 19, 1884. He attended Clark University when G. Stanley Hall was a leading teacher. He graduated in psychology from Springfield College and Clark University. He was a professor and chairman of the department of psychology at Indiana University. He served at various times as a visiting professor at the University of Chicago and Syracuse University. He wrote books on abnormal psychology, anomalistic psychology and the psychology of religion.

He died in a hospital in Bloomington, Indiana on October 6, 1942.

== Publications ==
- Introductory Psychology for Students of Education [with Frank Samuel Freeman] (1939)
- Three diagnostic Scorings for the Thurstone Personality Schedule (1937)
- Outline of Abnormal Psychology (1936)
- Principles of Adolescent Psychology (1935)
- The Scale of Values Method for Studies in Genetic Psychology (1923)
- Principles of Abnormal Psychology (1927, 1944)
- The Foster-Child Fantasy (1920)
- Collegiate Religious Education (1909)
