= Grace Conkling =

American poet

Grace Walcott Hazard Conkling
- Grace Walcott Hazard Conkling
- Born: Grace Walcott Hazard; February 7, 1878; New York City
- Died: November 15, 1958 (aged 80)
- Occupations: Poet, English Professor
- Spouse: Roscoe Platt Conkling
- Children: Hilda Conkling Elsa Kruuse

Grace Walcott Hazard Conkling (February 7, 1878 – November 15, 1958) was an American author, poet and English professor.

== Background ==
Grace Walcott Hazard was born in New York City on February 7, 1878. She earned a bachelor of letters degree at Smith College and then taught at the Graham School in New York. Hazard moved to France to study music, but she became ill and returned to the United States.

In 1905, Hazard married Rose Platt Conkling, and they lived on a ranch in Mexico. Conkling had two daughters, Hilda and Elsa. She died at the age of 80 on November 15, 1958.

== Career ==
In 1914, Hazard taught English at Smith College where she remained till she retired in 1947. She was a trustee of the Cummington School of the Arts, run by her colleague Katherine Frazier in western Massachusetts.

Conkling attracted wide attention as the teacher of her little daughter, Hilda Conkling, whose Poems by a Little Girl (1920) displayed great ability at an early age. Grace copied down her daughter's poems as they were spoken, which is the only record that exists of Hilda's work.

== Writings ==
Her collected volumes of verse include:

- Afternoons of April (1915)
- Wilderness Songs (1920)
- Ship's Log and Other Poems (1924)
- Flying Fish: A Book of Songs and Sonnets (1926)
- Witch and Other Poems (1929)
