= Dennis T. Phalen =

American politician

Dennis T. Phalen (April 29, 1856 – April 25, 1922) was a member of the Wisconsin State Assembly and the Wisconsin State Senate.

He was born in Lima, Sheboygan County, Wisconsin. He died at his home in Sheboygan, Wisconsin.

== Career ==
Phalen was elected District Attorney of Sheboygan County, Wisconsin, in 1882 and 1884 and was a member of the local board of education from 1885 to 1888. He was a member of the Assembly during the 1891 session and of the Senate during the 1893 and 1895 sessions. Phalen was later the city attorney of Sheboygan until his death. He was a Democrat.
