= Empire, Wisconsin =

- Town
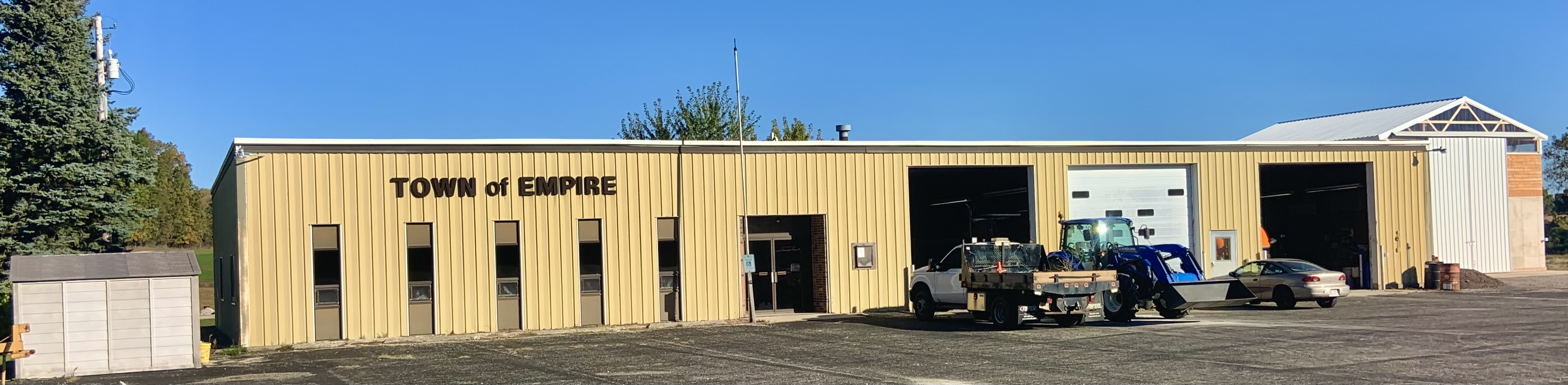
- Town hall

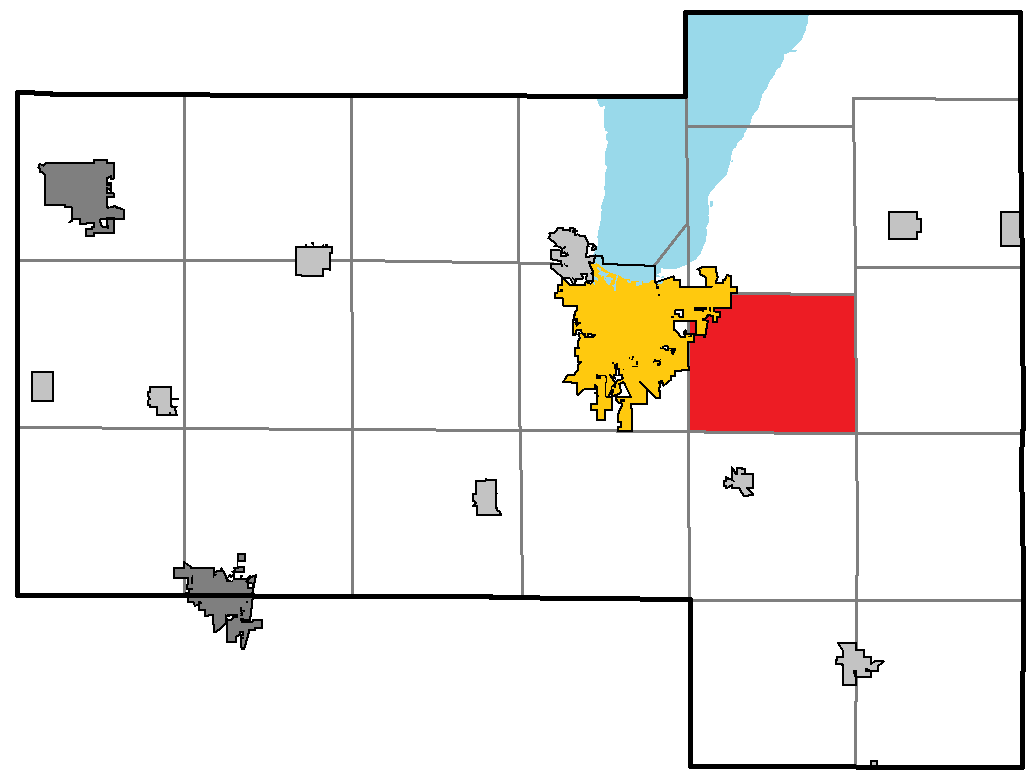
- Location of Empire, within Fond du Lac County
- Coordinates: 43°45′5″N 88°21′49″W
- Country: United States
- State: Wisconsin
- County: Fond du Lac

Area
  - Total: 29.2 sq mi (75.5 km^{2})
  - Land: 29.0 sq mi (75.1 km^{2})
  - Water: 0.12 sq mi (0.3 km^{2})
- Elevation: 1,070 ft (326 m)

Population (2020)
  - Total: 2,774
  - Density: 95.7/sq mi (36.9/km^{2})
- Time zone: UTC-6 (Central (CST))
  - Summer (DST): UTC-5 (CDT)
- Area code: 920
- FIPS code: 55-24050
- GNIS feature ID: 1583167
- Website: https://www.townofempire.org/

Empire is a town in Fond du Lac County, Wisconsin, United States. The population was 2,774 at the 2020 census.

== Geography ==
According to the United States Census Bureau, the town has a total area of 29.1 square miles (75.5 km^{2}), of which 29.0 square miles (75.2 km^{2}) is land and 0.1 square mile (0.3 km^{2}) (0.45%) is water.

== Demographics ==
At the 2000 census there were 2,620 people, 910 households, and 786 families living in the town. The population density was 90.3 people per square mile (34.9/km^{2}). There were 944 housing units at an average density of 32.5 per square mile (12.6/km^{2}). The racial makeup of the town was 98.13% White, 0.27% African American, 0.34% Native American, 0.65% Asian, 0.11% from other races, and 0.50% from two or more races. Hispanic or Latino of any race were 0.99%.

Of the 910 households 40.0% had children under the age of 18 living with them, 79.3% were married couples living together, 4.3% had a female householder with no husband present, and 13.6% were non-families. 11.4% of households were one person and 4.4% were one person aged 65 or older. The average household size was 2.88 and the average family size was 3.12.

The age distribution was 28.7% under the age of 18, 5.6% from 18 to 24, 26.8% from 25 to 44, 28.9% from 45 to 64, and 10.1% 65 or older. The median age was 40 years. For every 100 females, there were 102.5 males. For every 100 females age 18 and over, there were 101.6 males.

The median household income was $67,330 and the median family income was $70,511. Males had a median income of $42,875 versus $29,300 for females. The per capita income for the town was $27,174. About 0.5% of families and 1.5% of the population were below the poverty line, including 1.9% of those under age 18 and 2.6% of those age 65 or over.

== Notable people ==
- Charles Ruggles Boardman, U.S. National Guard general
- Edward Colman, Wisconsin State Representative
- David Giddings, Wisconsin Territorial legislator, engineer, and businessman
- Elmer E. Haight, Wisconsin State Representative
- James Lafferty, Wisconsin State Representative
- Michael Reilly, U.S. Representative
- Herman Schroeder, Wisconsin State Representative
- William A. Titus, businessman and politician
- Owen A. Wells, U.S. Representative
