= Peter Truax =

American philanthropist, businessman, farmer, and politician (1828–1909)

- Born: February 24, 1828; Steuben County, New York, U.S.
- Died: March 18, 1909 (aged 81); Eau Claire County, Wisconsin, U.S.
- Occupations: Entrepreneur; proprietor; land agent
- Political party: Prohibitionist
- Spouse: Cordella Avery (m. 1852)

Peter Truax (February 24, 1828 – March 18, 1909) was a philanthropist, businessman, farmer, and third-party politician in the Chippewa Valley of Wisconsin. Truax was a prominent figure in the Chippewa Valley and one of the richest men in the county. His acquisition of wealth was due to the many business ventures he took part in. Truax was one of the leaders of the Prohibitionist movement in the state and was nominated for state and federal office by organizations of that party on several occasions. He owned large stocks in the Bank of Eau Claire and the New Bank of Eau Claire.

Truax owned Truax Switch, four miles west of Eau Claire. He was featured in The Horse Review and frequently entered his horses in horse markets. Truax developed one of the largest horse raising industries of the northwest. He was a breeder of thoroughbred horses and it was recorded that he paid $1,000 for a fine mare named Nellie Mason, which he had purchased from New York State.

== Early life and career ==
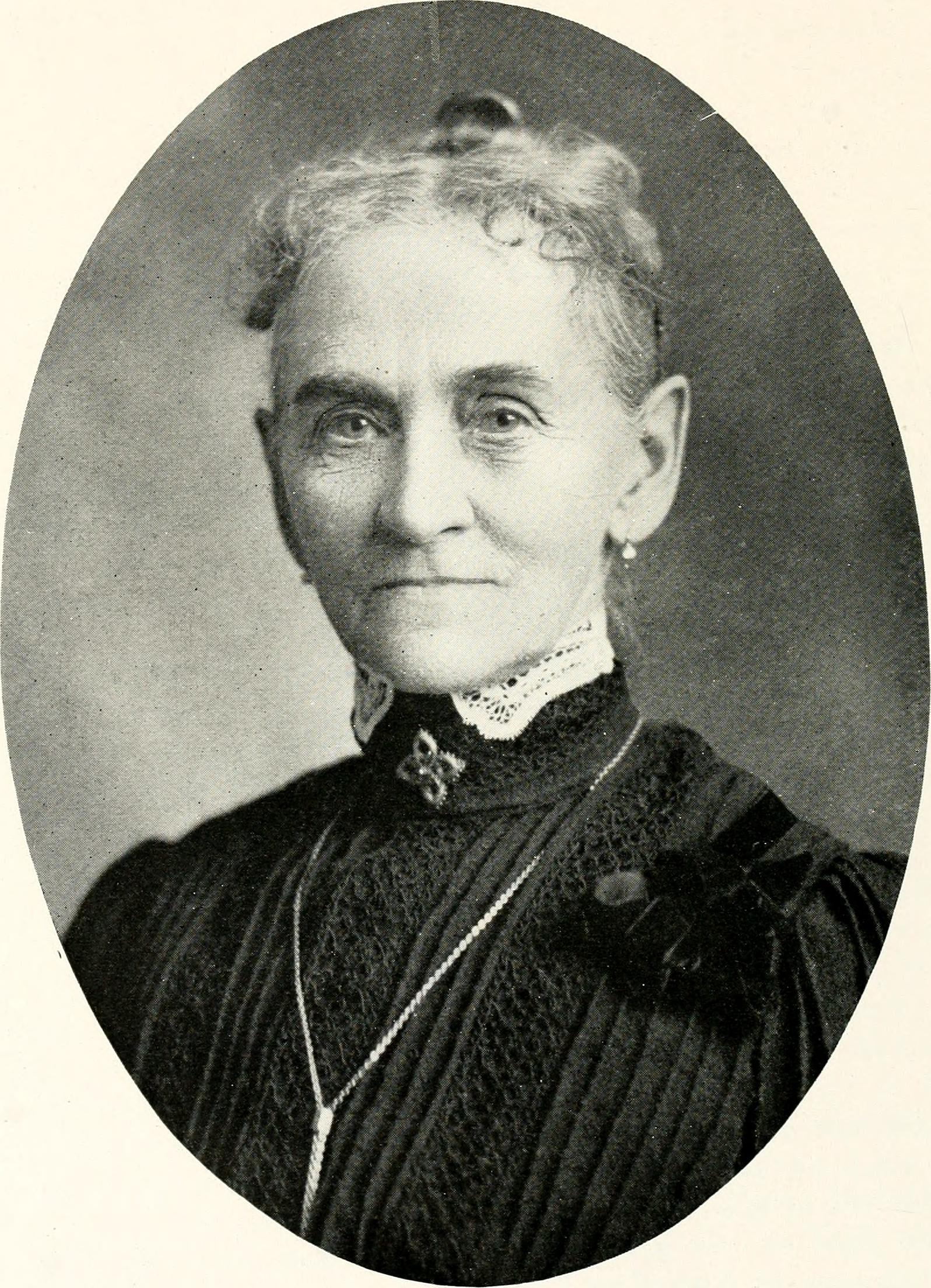
Cordella Avery

Peter Truax was born in Steuben County, New York in 1828. While he was a boy his parents moved to Allegany County, New York where he later married Cordella Avery on September 23, 1852. Truax and his wife came to Wisconsin in 1853, and settled in Walworth County, Wisconsin. They moved to Eau Claire, Wisconsin in 1855, locating on what later was known as Truax Prairie, where he engaged in farming until 1865 when he moved to town and engaged in general merchandising until 1873.

Truax worked in logging and in farming. He also dealt largely in timber lands and invested extensively in real estate. Truax was generally considered one of Eau Claire's millionaires. Truax held a large interest in sawmill property of the Cloquet Lumber Company, and he also held interest in an Electric rail transport system in the State of Idaho. In 1893, Truax purchased the National Electric Company for $7,500.

One of the largest buildings in the City of Eau Claire in its early days, Music Hall, was built and owned by Truax. It was replaced by the Kahn-Truax building which was destroyed by a fire in 1871. Truax also owned the Truax Building in Superior, Wisconsin.

=== Political involvement ===
Truax mounted a run in 1879 for a seat in the Wisconsin State Assembly. In a March 4, 1887 Special Election, Truax ran unsuccessfully against Nils P. Haugen to represent Wisconsin's 8th congressional district in the Fiftieth Congress of the United States House of Representatives. In 1898, he ran unsuccessfully as a candidate for the Wisconsin State Assembly against incumbent Byron Buffington.

== Death ==
Truax died at 11:20 p.m. on March 18, 1909, at his country residence on Truax Prairie. The cause of death was ulceration of the stomach.

== Legacy ==
Truax Boulevard is a street on the west side of Eau Claire named for Truax's contributions to the area. Truax's Prairie Home (built in 1864) has been restored and is open for public tours from May through September. Threatened with demolition, the house was moved to the Mill Run Golf Course in the City of Eau Claire in 1984. Originally an L-shaped house, the present two-story structure retains its Greek Revival roof and door architecture.

Truax is interred at Lakeview Cemetery in Eau Claire with a large memorial marker.
