= Buffington =

Buffington may refer to:

== Places in the United States ==
Communities

- Buffington, Georgia
- Buffington, Missouri
- Buffington Township, Indiana County, Pennsylvania

Landmarks

- Buffington Harbor, Gary, Indiana
- Buffington Hotel, a historic building in Westville, Oklahoma
- Buffington Island, in the Ohio River, between West Virginia and Ohio
  - Battle of Buffington Island, a battle of the American Civil War

== People ==
- Buffington (surname)
