= List of city managers of Eau Claire, Wisconsin =

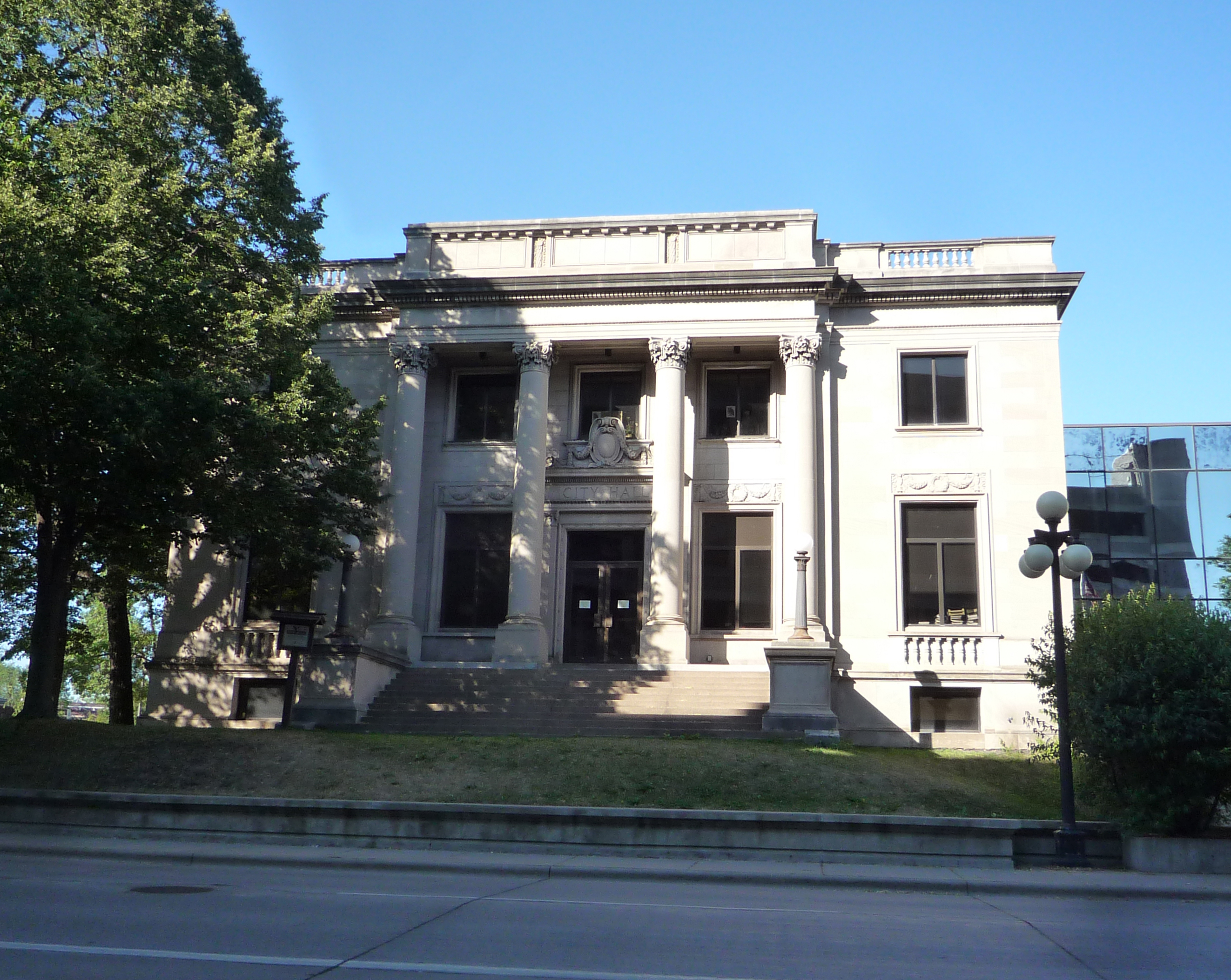
Eau Claire City Hall

This is a list of city managers and mayors of Eau Claire, Wisconsin, USA. Eau Claire was originally incorporated as a city in 1872, utilizing the mayor-council form of government. In 1910, Eau Claire switched to a city commission government, then in 1948, they voted to abolish the office of mayor and enact a council-manager form of government. They have retained that form of government ever since.

The first mayor of Eau Claire was Hiram P. Graham, a pioneer businessman who also served as a state senator. The first city manager was James R. Pollock, who previously served as city manager of Marquette, Michigan. The longest-serving city manager was Don T. Norrell, who served from September 1991 to December 2005. The current city manager is Stephanie Hirsch, since 2022; she previously served as operations administrator at the city Department of Human Services. She is Eau Claire's first female city manager.

== Mayors with 1-year term (1872–1902) ==
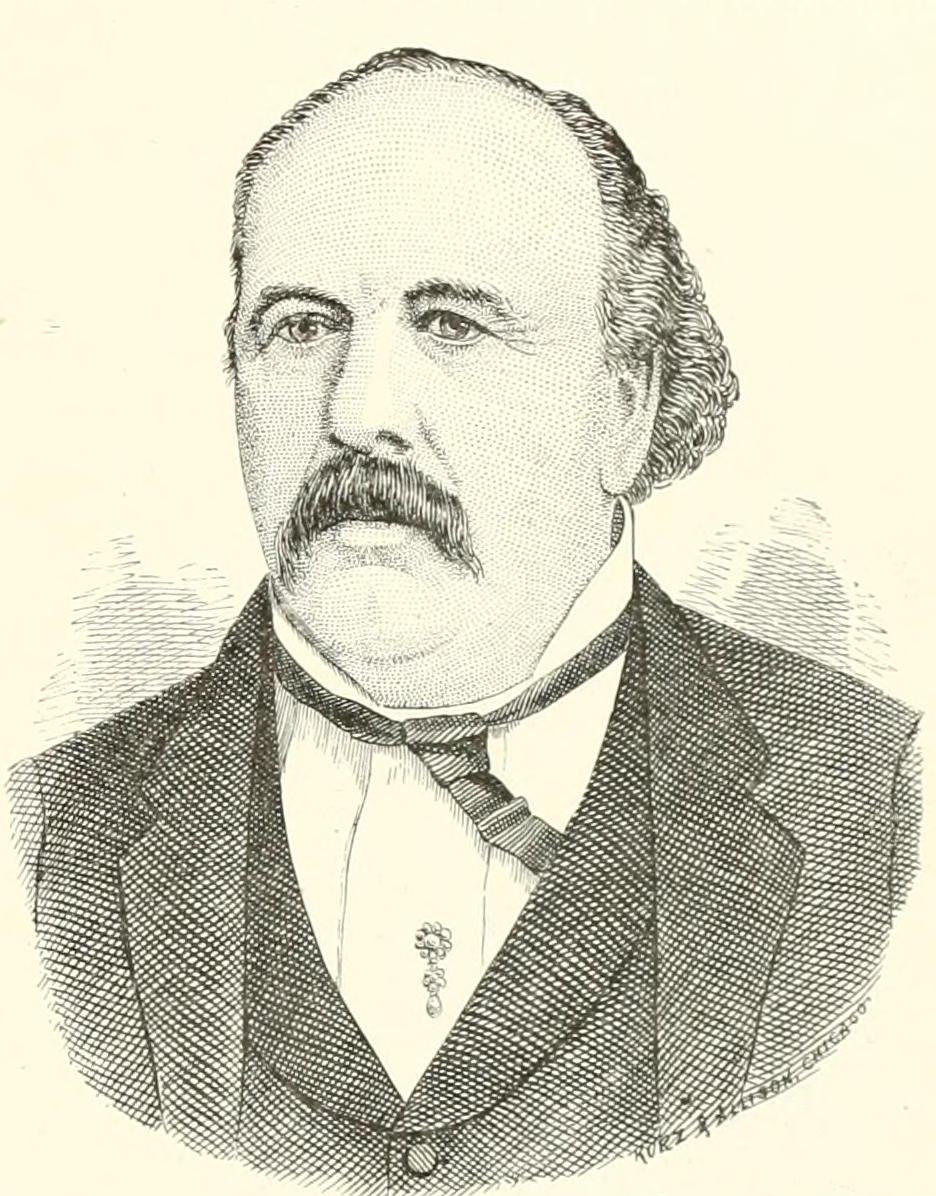
George Buffington, 4th mayor of Eau Claire.

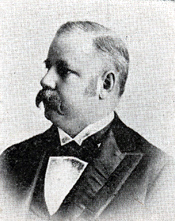
George B. Shaw, 15th mayor, later a U.S. representative.

Order	Mayor	Term start	Term end	Notes
1	Hiram P. Graham	1872	1873	
2	James P. Nelson	1873	1874	
3	Gilbert E. Porter	1874	1875	
4	George A. Buffington	1875	1876	
5	Levi M. Vilas	1876	1877	
6	William F. Bailey	1877	1878	
7	George W. Chapman	1878	1880	First two-term mayor.
8	J. F. Moore	1880	1881	
9	E. T. Farr	1881	1882	
10	William F. Bailey	1882	1884	First three-term mayor.
11	H. D. Davis	1884	1885	
12	D. W. Day	1885	1886	
13	John Grinsell	1886	1887	
14	William A. Rust	1887	1888	
15	George B. Shaw	1887	1890	
16	John Hunner	1890	1891	
17	John Ure Sr.	1891	1893	Democratic
18	George H. Hopper	1893	1894	Republican
19	D. A. Cameron	1894	1895	Republican
20	Henry L. Day	1895	1897	Democratic
21	William H. Frawley	1897	1898	Democratic
22	S. S. Kepler	1898	1899	Democratic
23	David L. Douglas	1899	1900	
24	William Rowe	1900	1902	Republican.

== Mayors with 2-year term (1902–1910) ==
Order	Mayor	Term start	Term end	Notes
24	William Rowe	1902	1906	Republican. First mayor to serve three consecutive terms. First mayor to serve four consecutive terms.
25	William H. Frawley	1906	1910	Democratic.

== Commission mayors (1910–1949) ==
Eau Claire voted in a February 15, 1910, city referendum to adopt a city commission government, with a mayor and two commissioners all elected at-large in nonpartisan elections.

Order	Mayor	Term start	Term end	Notes
26	John B. Fleming	1910	1916	
27	John E. Barron	1916	1928	
28	Fred Stussy	1928	1934	
29	Dwight D. Lockerby	1934	1940	
30	G. Donald Barnes	1940	1946	
31	Orville G. Christianson	1946	1949	

== City managers (1949–present) ==
Eau Claire voted in an April 6, 1948, city referendum to adopt a council–manager government, abolishing the office of mayor effective April 18, 1949.

Order	Manager	Term start	Term end	Notes
-	Herman D. White	1949	1949	President of the city council and initial acting city manager
1	James R. Pollock	1949	1952	Selected by city council in May 1949.
-	John Dever	1952	1952	Acting city manager.
2	David D. Rowlands	1952	1956	Selected by city council in June 1952.
-	N. J. Sindelar	1956	1956	Acting city manager.
3	Douglas G. Weiford	1956	1967	Selected by city council in September 1956.
-	Ray Wachs	1967	1968	Acting city manager.
4	Walter Kane	1968	1970	Selected by city council in December 1967.
5	Ray Wachs	1970	1978	Acting city manager from March 1970. Selected by city council in June 1970.
-	George Kumferman	1978	1978	Acting city manager.
6	Stephen J. Atkins	1978	1983	Selected by city council in July 1978.
-	George Kumferman	1983	1983	Acting city manager.
7	Eric A. Anderson	1983	1991	Selected by city council in October 1983.
-	Michael W. Huggins	1991	1991	Acting city manager.
8	Don T. Norrell	1991	2005	Selected by city council in August 1991.
9	Michael W. Huggins	2006	2011	Acting city manager from December 2005. Selected by city council in June 2006.
-	Brian Amundson	2011	2012	Acting city manager.
10	Russell Van Gompel	2012	2015	Selected by city council in August 2012.
11	J. Dale Peters	2015	2020	Acting city manager from December 2015. Selected by city council in December 2015.
-	David Solberg	2020	2022	Acting city manager.
12	Stephanie Hirsch	2022	2026	Selected by city council in March 2022.
13	David Solberg	2026	Present	Acting City Manager May-June 2026.

== City council presidents (1949-present) ==
Order	Council president	Term start	Term end	Notes
1	Herman White	1949	1955	
2	Leonard Haas	1955	1957	
3	W. R. Waters	1957	1961	
4	David Donnellan	1961	1963	
5	Richard Hibbard	1963	1965	
6	David Donnellan	1965	1967	
7	Stevens L. Riley	1967	1969	
8	Richard Hibbard	1969	1970	
9	George Losby	1970	1971	
10	J. Robert Mills	1971	1973	
11	Hal Crinion	1973	1977	
12	Marie Evans	1977	1978	
13	Richard Gillett	1978	1981	
14	Eric Wahl	1981	1984	
15	Shirley Crinion	1984	1987	
16	Wallace Rogers	1987	1991	
17	Allan Hofland	1991	1993	
18	Mark D. Lewis	1993	1997	First council president elected at-large.
19	William D. Nielsen, Jr.	1997	2001	
20	Howard White	2001	2005	
21	David J. Adler	2006	2009	
22	Kerry J. S. Kincaid	2009	2018	First council president after referendum lengthening term from two to three years.
23	Terry Weld	2019	2023	
24	Emily Berge	2023	2026	
25	Jeremy Gragert	2026	Current	

== See also ==
- Eau Claire, Wisconsin
- Eau Claire County, Wisconsin
- Political subdivisions of Wisconsin
