= Sheboygan County Historical Museum =

Coordinates: 43°45′10.2″N 87°44′52.7″W

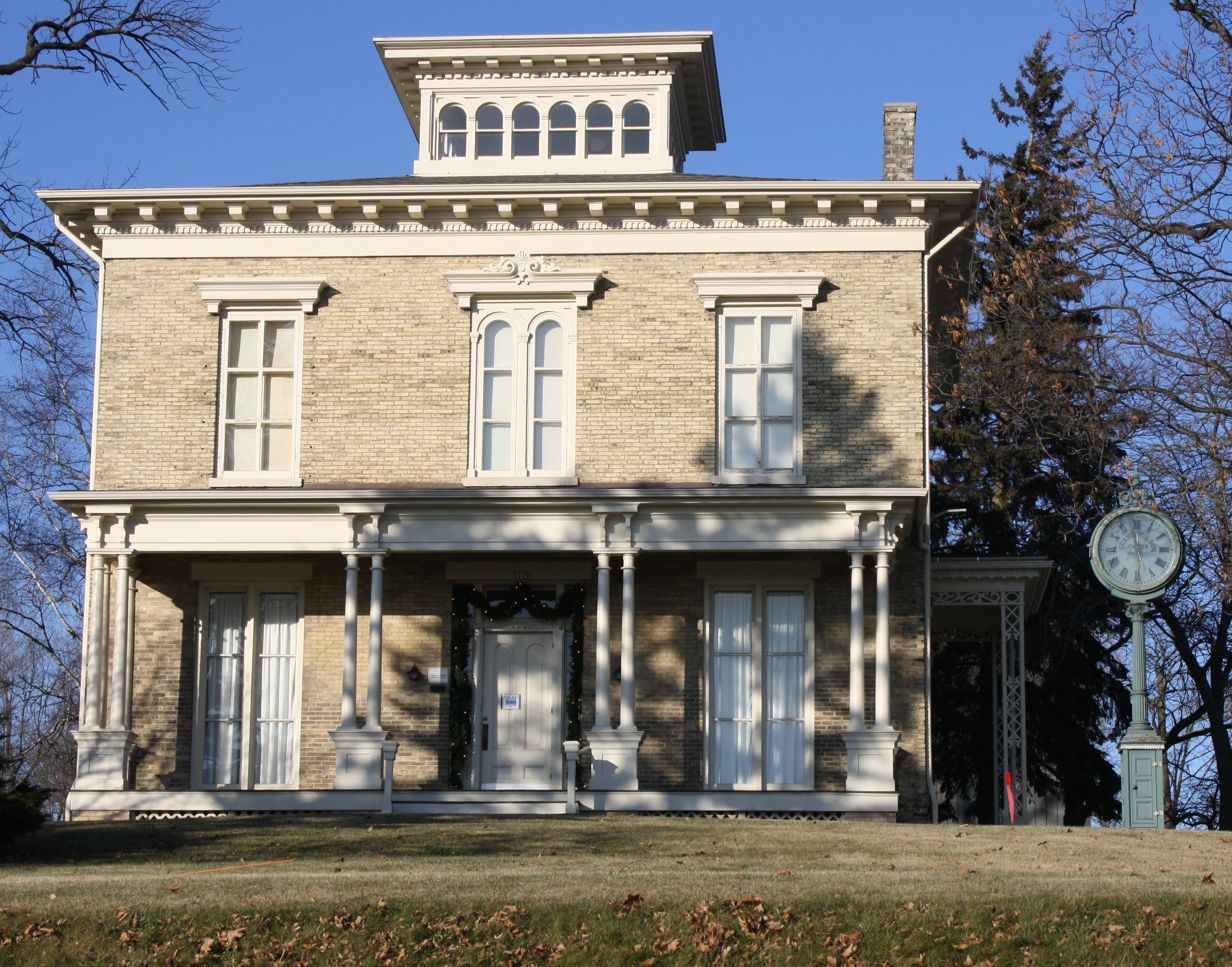
- Established: 1923
- Location: 3110 Erie Avenue; Sheboygan, Wisconsin; United States
- Type: Historical museum
- Collection size: 30,000+ artifacts
- Visitors: 12,000 annually
- Director: Travis Gross
- Owner: Sheboygan County
- Public transit access: Shoreline Metro
- Website: sheboygancounty.com

The Sheboygan County Historical Museum is located on the grounds of Taylor Park in Sheboygan, Wisconsin on the city's west side. The park, in addition to a park and a county-owned radio transmitter for county radio operations and non-commercial use by translators of WVCY-FM and WLDB from Milwaukee, contains the Taylor Park Reservoir which serves as water storage for the Sheboygan Water Utility, and the Sheboygan County Veterans Memorial.

The museum complex includes the historical David Taylor House, the 1864 Weinhold Family Homestead, the 1890s Schuchardt Barn with rural agricultural displays and the 1867 Bodenstab Cheese Factory with early commercial cheese making implements. The museum also features seasonal displays, temporary exhibits, classroom and the museum store. Changing exhibits include Native American history, ice harvesting, maritime, circus, local sports, and early agricultural.

== History ==
The David Taylor House, built in the early 1850s by Sheboygan County Judge David Taylor, a prominent citizen in the early years of Sheboygan. The house became county property around 1900 and was later used for the Sheboygan County Sheriff's Office and county jail from 1915 to 1936, when the Sheboygan County Courthouse was completed.

The house was then used by the caretaker of Taylor Park for many years and was leased to the Sheboygan County Historical Society in 1949. The road leading to the park known as Taylor Drive eventually became a west-side local beltline road for the city.

The Sheboygan County Historical Museum was originally on the first floor of the David Taylor House. In the early 1970s, the museum expanded to the entire building. The Taylor House served as the main museum building until the new museum was opened in 1997 across the grounds.

== See also ==
- David Taylor House
