= David Taylor House =

- U.S. National Register of Historic Places
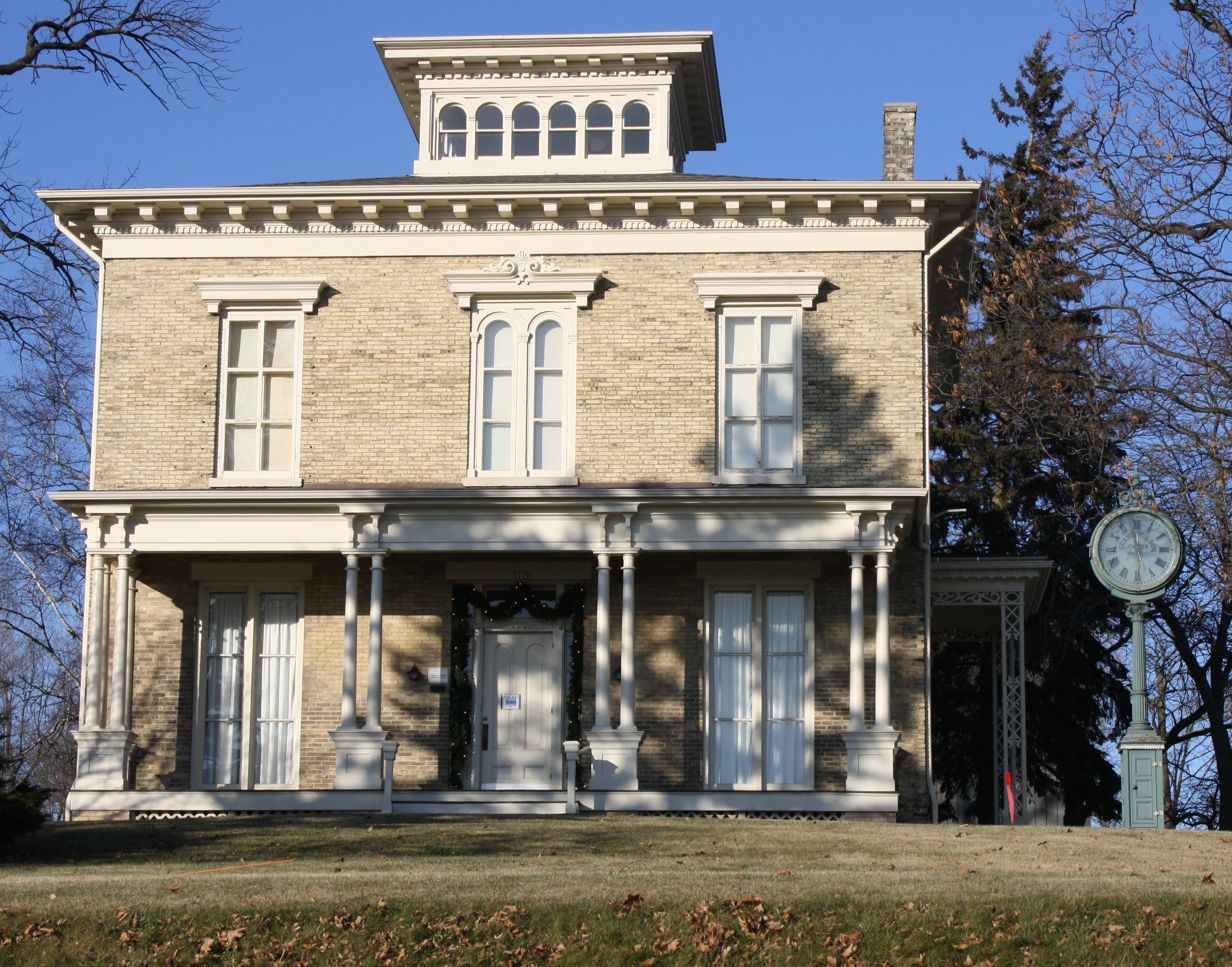
- Location: 3110 Erie Avenue; Sheboygan, Wisconsin; United States
- Coordinates: 43°45′10″N 87°44′53″W
- Built: 1850s
- NRHP reference No.: 76000080
- Added to NRHP: January 2, 1976

The David Taylor House is a historic building located on the grounds of the Sheboygan County Historical Museum in Sheboygan, Wisconsin.

== History ==
The Taylor House, built in the early 1850s by Judge David Taylor, a once prominent citizen in Sheboygan. Taylor was a circuit court judge and invested in the community in harbor development, railroads and many other community projects. He went on to the Wisconsin State Senate and the Wisconsin Supreme Court.

The house became Sheboygan County property around 1900 and was later used for the Sheboygan County Sheriff's Office and jail from 1915 to 1936, when the Sheboygan County Courthouse was completed on the city's east side.

The house was used by the caretaker of Taylor Park for many years and was leased to the Sheboygan County Historical Society in 1949.

The Historical Society removed the jail equipment, including the bars from the windows and opened it as the county museum in 1954. Some of the exterior architectural details were removed or "updated" at that time and everything received a fresh coat of paint. A major landscaping plan was completed around the outside of the building. The museum was originally on the first floor. In the early 1970s, the museum expanded to the entire building. The Taylor House served as the main museum building until the new museum was opened in 1997.

The Taylor House was land-marked locally and added to the National Register of Historic Places in 1976.

== Restoration ==
Major restoration work took place in 2006 to clean and tuck pointing the brick and included the removal of the 1950s front porch and building a replica of the 1850s formal front porch, repair of wood architectural features as well as the removal of the fire escape. Because the David Taylor House is on the National Register of Historic Places, there are specific guidelines required in the restoration work.
