= Senator Cook (disambiguation) =

Marlow Cook (1926–2016) was a U.S. Senator from Kentucky from 1968 to 1974. Senator Cook may also refer to:

- Bill Cook (politician) (born 1945), North Carolina State Senate
- Burton C. Cook (1819–1894), Illinois State Senate
- Charles D. Cook (1935–2001), New York State Senate
- Charles Cook (New York politician) (1800–1866), New York State Senate
- Dwight Cook (born 1951), North Dakota State Senate
- Elijah Fox Cook (1805–1886), Michigan State Senate
- George W. F. Cook (1919–2009), Vermont State Senate
- Howard C. Cook (1918–1983), Ohio State Senate
- James M. Cook (1807–1868), New York State Senate
- John Parsons Cook (1817–1872), Iowa State Senate
- John Cook (governor) (1730–1789), Delaware State Senate
- Tanya Cook (born 1964), Nebraska State Senate
- Willis C. Cook (1874–1942), South Dakota State Senate
- Zadock Cook (1769–1863), Georgia State Senate

== See also ==
- Senator Cooke (disambiguation)
