= 1885 Wisconsin Supreme Court election =

- April 7, 1885
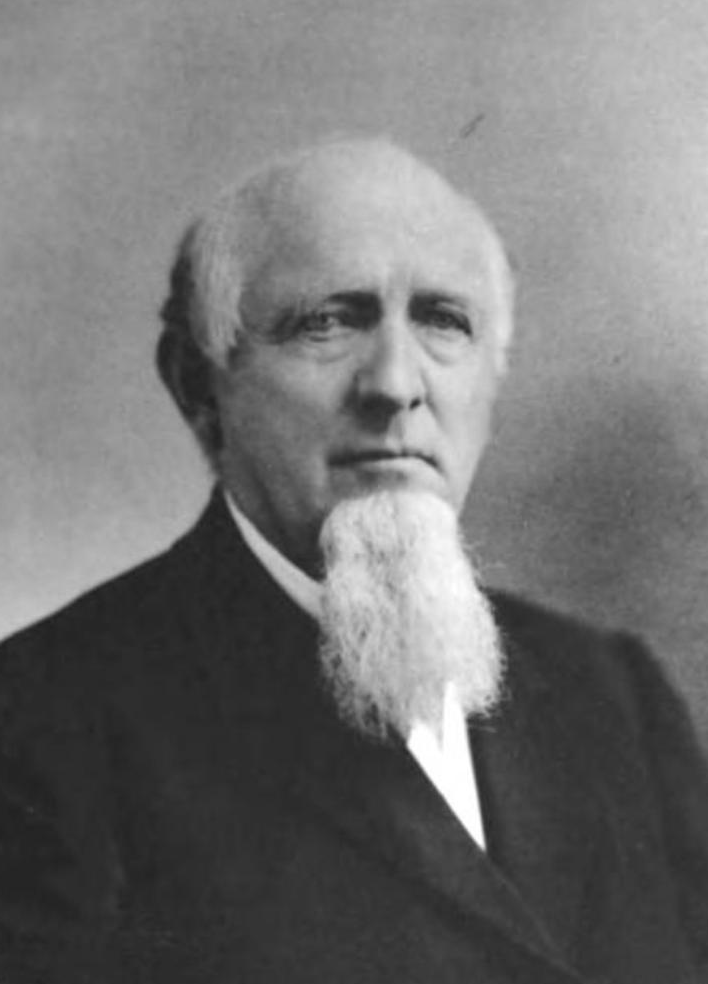

Candidate	David Taylor	Levi M. Vilas (write-in)
Popular vote	192,324	2,018
Percentage	98.91%	1.04%
Justice before election
David Taylor
Elected Justice
David Taylor

The 1885 Wisconsin Supreme Court election was held on April 7, 1885. It saw the re-election of incumbent justice David Taylor.

== Candidate ==
- David Taylor, incumbent justice
- Levi M. Vilas (received write-in votes), former mayor and city attorney of Eau Claire

== Result ==
1885 Wisconsin Supreme Court election
Party	Candidate	Votes	%	±%
Nonpartisan	David Taylor (incumbent)	192,324	98.91	
write-in	Levi M. Vilas	2,018	1.04	
write-in	scattering	99	0.05	
Total votes		194,411	100	
