= Sheboygan County Sheriff's Department =

- Uniform patch

- Badge
- Motto: "To protect and serve the citizens of our community by reducing fear, crime and disorder."

Agency overview
- Formed: appx. 1846; 180 years ago
- Employees: 180
- Annual budget: $22 million

Jurisdictional structure
- Population: 118,000
- Legal jurisdiction: Sheboygan County, Wisconsin
- General nature: Local civilian police

Operational structure
- Headquarters: 525 North 6th Street; Sheboygan, Wisconsin 53081; United States
- Deputies: 73
- Sheriff responsible: Matthew Spence

Facilities
- Stations: 1
- Patrol Boats: 2
- Patrol Dogs: 2

Website
- www.sheboygansheriff.com

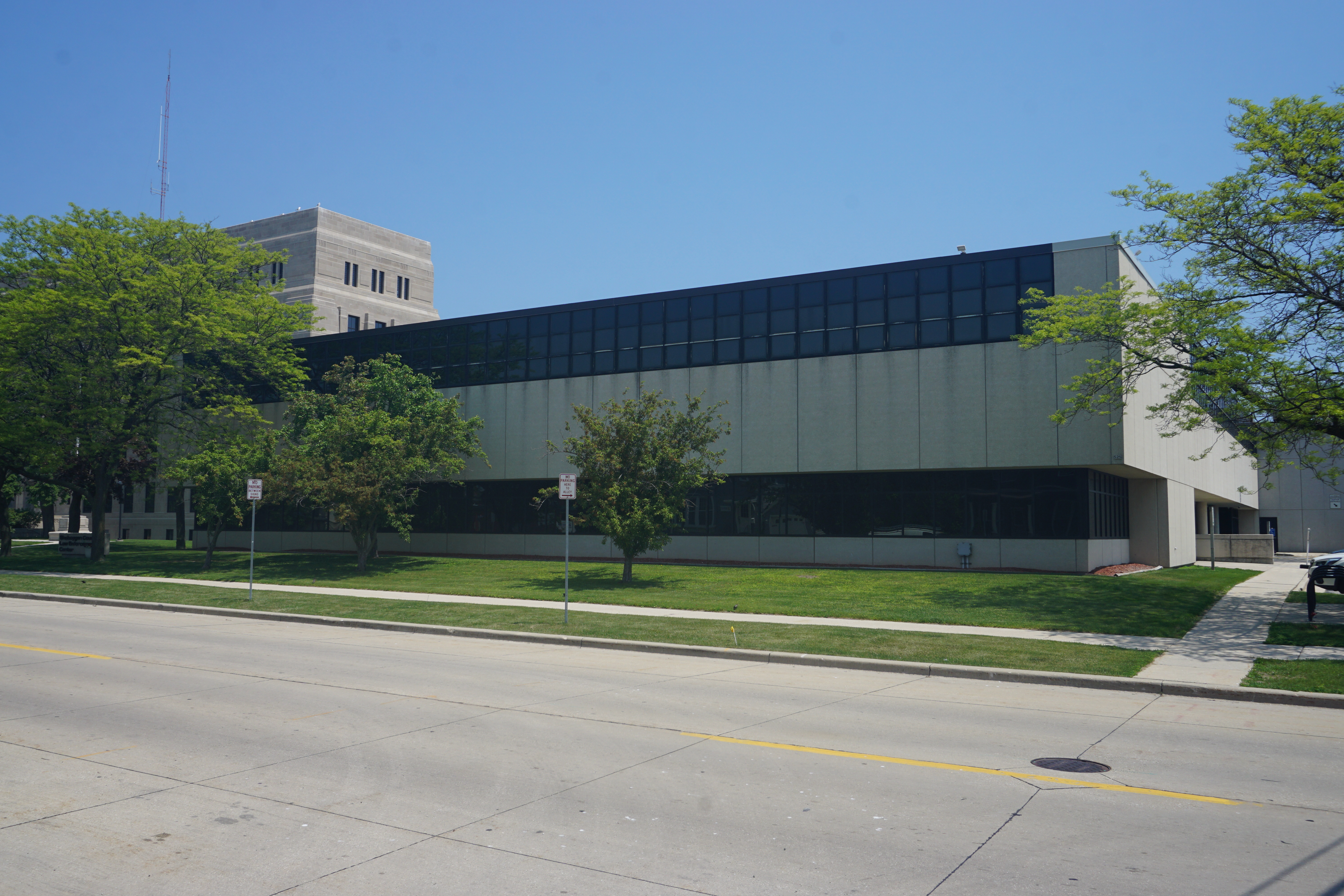
Sheboygan County Law Enforcement Center in June 2025

The Sheboygan County Sheriff's Department is the principal law enforcement agency that serves Sheboygan County, Wisconsin. The current sheriff is Matthew Spence, who was appointed by Governor Tony Evers in 2024.

== History ==
Sheboygan County, located on the western shores of Lake Michigan, was first established on December 17, 1838, two years after it was split from Brown County by an act of the Wisconsin Territorial Legistature. The office of the sheriff was established in 1846; T.C. Horner would be the first appointed sheriff.

Before 1936, the sheriff's office and jail would move several times around Sheboygan, including a still-standing brick building at North 14th Street and Pennsylvania Avenue, and David Taylor House on Taylor Hill, which still stands today in the same location as a part of the Sheboygan County Historical Museum. In 1936, the current Sheboygan County Courthouse was dedicated, giving the sheriff's department and jail a dedicated space within the building's sixth and top floor. However, the county's growth and more need for jail space (along with overall accessibility concerns for the jail and department) would eventually hasten the need for a dedicated facility several decades later.

In 1981, the Sheboygan County Sheriff's Department relocated to its present location inside the Law Enforcement Center at 525 North 6th Street in Sheboygan. At the time, it was a very contemporary linear facility with modern security systems. The second floor of the Sheriff's Office served as the county jail until 1998 when a 95,000 square foot, 295 bed Detention Center was constructed on the city's south side to house male offenders, with the Law Enforcement Center re-adapted for juvenile detention and women's operations; though it was intended to also have space for the sheriff's department and the Sheboygan Police Department, the latter chose to build its own headquarters on North 23rd Street between Superior Avenue and Kohler Memorial Drive in the mid-2000s.

In 2012, after years of discussion, the Sheboygan County government and city of Sheboygan common council approved a joint dispatch center based out of the Law Enforcement Center. Under the proposal, the city will fund remodeling of the new center by providing $2.5 million for the project. The Joint Dispatch Center began operation in 2016.

== Divisions ==
=== Patrol ===
The Sheboygan County Sheriff's Department is responsible for the safety and security of Sheboygan County's fifteen townships, eight villages, as well as 1,087 miles of roads. The duties of the patrol division include investigations of criminal and civil complaints, enforcement of traffic laws, investigate traffic crashes, crime prevention, and public relations.

The Patrol Division is staffed by 47 sworn officers, including three lieutenants and six sergeants. The patrol division provides contract patrol to the villages of Oostburg, Cedar Grove, Random Lake, Howards Grove, Glenbeulah, Town of Wilson, and Town of Holland.

=== Criminal investigation ===
The Criminal Investigation Division consists of a lieutenant, detective sergeant, and seven detectives, and investigates time-consuming, complex or specialized crimes impractical for patrol deputy investigation.

=== Correctional ===
The Corrections Division is the largest division of the department and dates back to the county's establishment. The corrections division operates the Sheboygan County Detention Center, located at 2923 South 31st Street and the Sheboygan County Juvenile Detention Center, located at 527 North 6th Street in Sheboygan. The corrections division is made up of two secretaries, two booking clerks, 59 correctional officers, 12 supervisors, an electronic monitoring officer and classification/court officer, a corrections administrator and assistant, and an alternatives to incarceration (ATI) coordinator and three assistant officers.

=== Civil process and court services ===
The Sheboygan County Sheriff's Office Civil Process Division handles the service of legal papers pursuant to Wisconsin State Statute. The Court Services Division primary responsibilities are Sheboygan County Courthouse security and prisoner transportation. Five full-time and five part-time deputies are assigned to the Court Services Division. The sheriff of each county is required by Wisconsin State Statute to be present in Circuit Courts.

=== Communications ===
The Sheboygan County Communications Center provides joint dispatch for all municipalities in Sheboygan County, including the city of Sheboygan itself, along with maintaining infrastructure such as communications towers and equipment.

=== Special teams ===
The department offers specialized services to the community. Team members receive extensive specialized training in these areas. The county also coordinates with the Manitowoc County and Fond du Lac County sheriff's departments and their specialized drug units, and the Milwaukee Police Department's bomb squad is also called up to investigate and contain incendiary devices within the county on an as-needed basis.

- Bicycle Patrol
- Correctional Emergency Response Team
- Crisis/Hostage Negotiation
- Diving & Rescue/Marine Unit
- Drone Team
- Gang Enforcement Team
- Honor Guard
- K-9 Unit
- Crash Reconstruction
- SWAT Team

== Fallen officers ==
Since the department's establishment, one deputy has died in the line of duty.

Deputy	Date of death	Details
Lieutenant LeRoy Henry Nennig, Jr.	August 15, 2004	Motorcycle accident

== See also ==
- List of law enforcement agencies in Wisconsin
