= Hiram P. Graham =

American politician and businessman (1820–1902)

1st Mayor of Eau Claire, Wisconsin
- In office March 2, 1872 – April 1873
- Preceded by: Position established
- Succeeded by: James P. Nelson

Member of the Wisconsin Senate from the 30th district
- In office January 5, 1874 – January 4, 1876
- Preceded by: Joseph G. Thorp
- Succeeded by: Rockwell J. Flint

Sheriff of Eau Claire County, Wisconsin
- In office March 1862 – January 1863
- Appointed by: Louis P. Harvey
- Preceded by: John R. Wheeler
- Succeeded by: D. C. Whipple

Personal details
- Born: March 29, 1820 Town of Windham, Greene County, New York, U.S.
- Died: January 24, 1902 (aged 81) Eau Claire, Wisconsin, U.S.
- Resting place: Forest Hill Cemetery, Eau Claire
- Party: Democratic
- Spouse: Mary Jane Cowen (m. 1848–1902)
- Children: 5
- Occupation: Millwright, businessman, manufacturer, politician

Hiram Pease Graham (March 29, 1820 – January 24, 1902) was an American businessman, Democratic politician, and Wisconsin pioneer. He was the first mayor of Eau Claire, Wisconsin, and was an important investor in the development of the city, being one of the founders of the Phoenix Manufacturing Company. He also served two years in the Wisconsin Senate, representing Wisconsin's 30th Senate district during the 1874 and 1875 terms, and was sheriff of Eau Claire County, Wisconsin, in 1862.

== Biography ==
Hiram Pease Graham was born March 29, 1820, in the town of Windham, Greene County, New York. He was raised and educated there, attending common and select schools. After completing his education, he went to work as a millwright. In 1844, he moved to Canada and continued working as a millwright there for about eight years. In 1852, he returned to Allegany County, New York, and purchased a lumber mill that he operated until 1856.

In 1856, he was hired by the Eau Claire Lumber Company to move west and superintend their lumbering business in the young village of Eau Claire, Wisconsin. He brought his family to join him in Eau Claire in the fall of 1857, and remained there for the rest of his life. fter a few years working for the Eau Claire Lumber Company, Graham bought a planing mill in 1861 in partnership with his brother-in-law, Robert Tolles. They operated the mill under the firm name Graham, White, & Co., for the manufacturing of sashes, doors, and blinds, until the mill burned down in 1875. In the meantime, however, they had acquired additional facilities, including a foundry and machine shop. They rebuilt their factory under the new firm name the Phoenix Manufacturing Company, and grew that business into a major regional manufacturer. Graham was also a founder and president for many years of the Dells Lumber Company.

== Political career ==
Graham received his first public office in May 1861 when he was appointed surveyor general of his area of the state by governor Alexander Randall. The following year, he was appointed sheriff by Randall's successor, Louis P. Harvey, after the incumbent sheriff, John R. Wheeler, resigned to serve in the Union Army.

After the Civil War, Graham became more politically active with the Democratic Party. He was elected a village trustee after Eau Claire incorporated as a village, and on March 19, 18–72, he was elected Eau Claire's first mayor when it incorporated as a city.

In the fall of 1873, Graham was elected to the Wisconsin Senate running on the Democratic Party ticket. He represented Wisconsin's 30th Senate district, which then comprised all of Chippewa, Dunn, Eau Claire, and Pepin counties. He served in the 1874 and 1875 legislative sessions. He did not run for re-election in 1875.

He ran for another term as mayor in 1879 and 1880, but lost both elections. He later won several terms on the City Council, and in 1888, he was appointed postmaster at Eau Claire by president Grover Cleveland.

Graham died at his home in Eau Claire, Wisconsin after suffering a stroke in January 1902.

Wisconsin Senate
Preceded by Joseph G. Thorp	Member of the Wisconsin Senate from the 30th district January 5, 1874 – January 4, 1876	Succeeded by Rockwell J. Flint
Political offices
New city government	Mayor of Eau Claire, Wisconsin; March 1872 – April 1873	Succeeded by James P. Nelson
Legal offices
Preceded by John R. Wheeler	Sheriff of Eau Claire County, Wisconsin; March 1862 – January 1863	Succeeded by D. C. Whipple
