= Robert H. Hotchkiss =

Wisconsin politician (1818–1879)

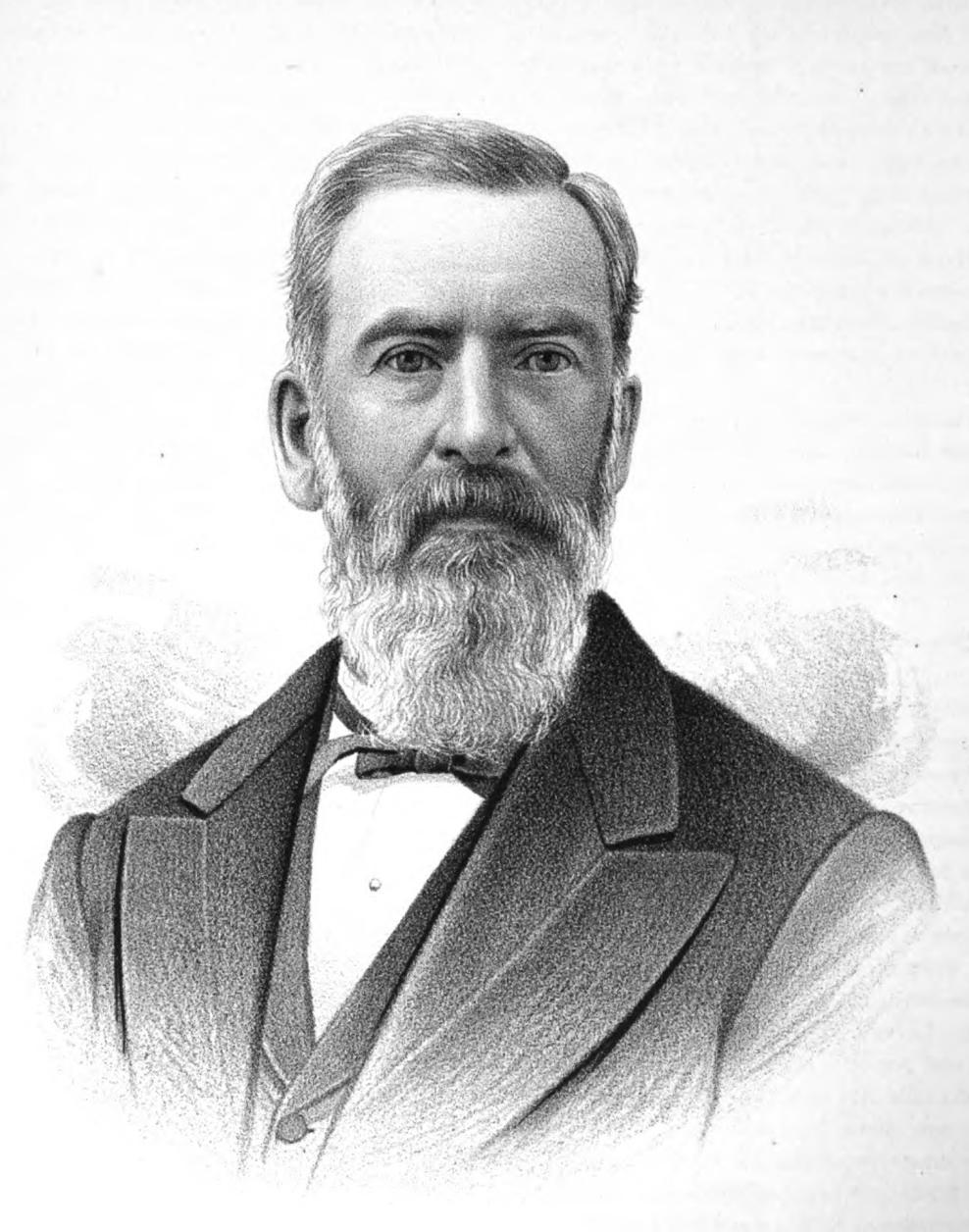

Member of the Wisconsin Senate from the 1st district
- In office January 6, 1868 – January 4, 1869
- Preceded by: Van Eps Young
- Succeeded by: David Taylor
- In office January 3, 1859 – January 7, 1861
- Preceded by: Elijah Fox Cook
- Succeeded by: Luther H. Cary

Member of the Wisconsin State Assembly from the Sheboygan 2nd district
- In office January 5, 1857 – January 4, 1858
- Preceded by: Reed C. Brazelton
- Succeeded by: William H. Prentice

Personal details
- Born: Robert Henry Hotchkiss; December 24, 1818 Smithfield, New York, U.S.
- Died: September 29, 1878 (aged 59) New York, New York, U.S.
- Resting place: Union Cemetery Plymouth, Wisconsin
- Party: Democratic; Free Soil (1848–1850); Whig (before 1848)
- Spouses: Jenette Eliza Bartholf; (m. 1851; died 1898)
- Children: Alice Isabella (Huson)^{(b. 1854; died 1933)}; Ida Annette (Dow)^{(b. 1855; died 1933)}
- Parents: Amzi Hotchkiss (father); Aruby (Henry) Hotchkiss (mother)
- Occupation: farmer, tanner, miller

Robert Henry Hotchkiss (December 24, 1818 – September 29, 1878) was an American businessman, Democratic politician, and Wisconsin pioneer. He served three years in the Wisconsin Senate (1859, 1860, 1868) and one year in the state Assembly (1857), representing Sheboygan County.

== Biography ==
Robert Hotchkiss was born on December 24, 1818, Christmas Eve, in Smithfield, New York. As a child, he moved with his parents to Utica, New York, where he was raised and educated.

In the 1830s, the family moved west to the Wisconsin Territory, stopping briefly in Green Bay, but then settling on a farm in the town of East Troy, Walworth County. As a young man, Hotchkiss trained as a printer in nearby Madison, Wisconsin, and alternated seasons between farm work at home and his printing apprenticeship in Madison.

During his time in Madison, Hotchkiss became active in politics with the Whig Party, and he was hired as a fireman for the 2nd Wisconsin Territorial Assembly. In these years, he also became active in the local temperance movement.

Hotchkiss's father died in 1840, and Hotchkiss moved to the village of Milwaukee with his mother and sister, where he began working in the tanning and milling businesses. Disease soon struck, however, and both his mother and sister died in 1847, leaving Robert with no close relatives. Hotchkiss continued his political activity in Milwaukee, and became a leading member of the Wisconsin branch of the Free Soil Party when that party was established in 1848.

In 1849, Hotchkiss moved north to the town of Plymouth, in Sheboygan County, Wisconsin, bringing with him milling machinery. In Plymouth, he installed the machinery in a mill that became known as the Quit-Qui-Oc mill. The mill became Hotchkiss's primary source of income for the rest of his life.

== Political career ==
Hotchkiss's politics continued to evolve, following the Compromise of 1850, he was one of several Free Soilers who joined the Democratic Party as Douglas Democrats. He made his first bid for state office in 1854, running for Wisconsin State Assembly in Sheboygan County's western district; he lost the election to Republican Luther H. Cary. The following year, however, he was elected chairman of the town board in Plymouth, and was ex officio a member of the Sheboygan County board of supervisors.

Hotchkiss ran again for Assembly in 1856, under new legislative maps; under the new maps, his district comprised just the northeastern quadrant of the county. This time he won the election, defeating his Republican opponent William Graves. He served in the 10th Wisconsin Legislature and did not run for re-election in 1857.

In 1858, he was the Democratic nominee for Wisconsin Senate in the 1st Senate district; the 1st Senate district then comprised all of Sheboygan County. He defeated Republican Bille Williams in the general election, and served in the Senate for the 1859 and 1860 terms. He did not run for re-election in 1860.

Hotchkiss remained active with the Democratic Party even through the Civil War, but did not run for public office during those years. In 1866, the Sheboygan County Democratic Party attempted to nominate him for state Senate again, after another candidate declined. Hotchkiss also declined the nomination at that time, but his name was still used in the election canvass, in a losing effort against Republican Van Eps Young. Young resigned, however, after the conclusion of the regular session of the 20th Wisconsin Legislature, and Hotchkiss was elected to fill out the remainder of his term in the 1868 term. He was a candidate for Senate again in 1870, but lost again, to John H. Jones.

He was selected for the Greeley slate of presidential electors in the 1872 presidential election, but Wisconsin voted for the Republican slate. He remained active in politics for the remainder of his life, but was not a candidate for office again.

Outside of politics, Hotchkiss was extremely active in the Independent Order of Odd Fellows fraternal organization. In the fall of 1878, he traveled to Baltimore for a convention of that organization. On his return trip, he stopped at his daughter's house in New York City; he died there on September 29, 1878.

== Personal life and family ==
Robert H. Hotchkiss was one of two children born to Amzi Hotchkiss and his wife Aruba (née Henry).

On July 3, 1851, Robert Hotchkiss married Jenette Eliza Bartholf. They had two daughters together, who both survived them.
