= Wisconsin Capitol Police =

Wisconsin State Capitol Police
- Patch
- Common name: Wisconsin Capitol Police

Jurisdictional structure
- Operations jurisdiction: Wisconsin, U.S.
- General nature: Civilian police
- Specialist jurisdictions: Buildings and lands occupied or explicitly controlled by the institution and the institution's personnel, and public entering the buildings and precincts of the institution; Protection of international or domestic VIPs, protection of significant state assets

Operational structure
- Headquarters: 17 W. Main St, Madison, WI
- Agency executive: David M Erwin, Chief
- Parent agency: Wisconsin Department of Administration

Website
- Official website

The Wisconsin State Capitol Police is a police force maintained by the Wisconsin Department of Administration, and is responsible for policing the Wisconsin State Capitol, state government facilities and the protection of the Governor and Lieutenant Governor of Wisconsin.

== History ==
The origins of the force date to 1881, when five police officers were employed at the Wisconsin State Capitol. In 1903, this was increased to eight police officers, supported by two night watchmen. In 1911, the eight police officers were under the supervision of the Superintendent of Public Property.

In 1969, a Catholic priest, Father James Groppi, organized the "Welfare Mothers' March on Madison." One thousand welfare mothers occupied the chamber of the State Assembly for 11 hours, in protest against planned welfare cuts. In response, the State Legislature replaced the then Capitol Security force with the "State Protective Services", which saw the force grow to 66 police officers and 13 detectives, responsible for providing law enforcement services at the Capitol and other Department of Administration facilities in the state.

In 2000, law enforcement responsibilities for the State Fair Park in West Allis were transferred from the Wisconsin State Fair Park Police Department to the Capitol Police and the two departments merged. In 2008, the two were again separated. In 2004, Governor Jim Doyle proposed merging the Capitol Police with the State Patrol. In 2010, the force had 48 full-time employees. The force was officially renamed "Wisconsin State Capitol Police" in 2013, and new black uniforms and redesigned patches were issued.

== Structure ==
The Capitol Police have statewide jurisdiction to enforce criminal and civil laws. They are responsible for security at all state owned and leased facilities, and oversee events and demonstrations that take place on state property. They provide protection to the Governor, family, Lieutenant Governor, and other high ranking dignitaries. The headquarters of the Capitol Police are located in the Risser Justice Center in Madison, with substations in the State Capitol and the Milwaukee State Office Building.

=== Patrol Operations Section ===
Patrol Operations is the uniformed section of the force, with officers in Madison and Milwaukee. It is responsible for providing uniformed police officers who patrol Department of Administration managed properties on foot or in vehicles. The Section is responsible for crowd management during events and political demonstrations.

The Patrol Operations Section also includes an Executive Residence Detail composed of specially trained police officers assigned to the Wisconsin Executive Residence to protect the State Governor.

=== Specialized Services Section ===
The Capitol Police Specialized Services Section has three units: The Criminal Investigations Unit (CIU), the Communications Unit (COMU), and the Infrastructure Security Unit (ISU).

=== Criminal Investigations Unit ===
The Criminal Investigations Unit conducts criminal investigations, prepares and executes search warrants and subpoenas, preserves and collects evidence, provides victim services, manages court services, and assists the patrol, dignitary, and security units as required. The Criminal Investigations Unit processes over a thousand court cases each year.

=== Executive Residence Detail ===
The Executive Residence Detail provides protective security to the Governor of Wisconsin, their family, the Lieutenant Governor of Wisconsin, and other high ranking dignitaries who work for and visit the state.

=== K-9 Unit ===
The K-9 Unit consists of one handler and one police dog, trained in detecting explosives, trained in "vapor wake" detection.

=== Unmanned Aircraft Unit ===
The Capitol Police operates an unmanned aerial vehicle (drone), used for law enforcement purposes, as well as emergency management, crime scene investigation and missing person searches.

== See also ==
- List of law enforcement agencies in Wisconsin
