= Senator Cooke =

Senator Cooke may refer to:

- Alec Cooke, Baron Cooke of Islandreagh (1920–2007), Northern Irish Senate
- Charles A. Cooke (1848–1917), North Carolina State Senate
- Charles M. Cooke (1844–1920), North Carolina State Senate
- John H. Cooke (1911–1998), New York State Senate
- John Cooke (Colorado politician) (fl. 2000s–2010s), Colorado State Senate
- Lorrin A. Cooke (1831–1902), Connecticut State Senate
- Walter E. Cooke (1910–1982), New York State Senate

== See also ==
- Senator Cook (disambiguation)
