= Buffington (surname) =

Buffington is a surname. Notable people with the surname include:

- Adelbert Rinaldo Buffington (1837–1922), American soldier
- Brett Buffington (born 1961) American former professional tennis player
- Byron Buffington (1852–1929), American politician
- Cam Buffington (born 2005), American football player
- Charlie Buffinton (born Buffington, 1861–1907), American baseball player
- George Buffington (1825–1893), American politician
- Joseph Buffington (1855–1947), American judge
- Joseph Buffington (congressman) (1803–1872), American member of Congress
- Nancy Buffington (1939–2021), American politician
- Thomas Buffington (1855–1938), American Indian Chief
