= Elijah Fox Cook =

American politician (1805–1886)

E. Fox Cook

Member of the Wisconsin Senate from the 1st district
- In office January 5, 1857 – January 3, 1859
- Preceded by: David Taylor
- Succeeded by: Robert H. Hotchkiss

3rd Mayor of Sheboygan, Wisconsin
- In office April 1855 – April 1858
- Preceded by: F. R. Townsend
- Succeeded by: William N. Shafter

District Attorney of Sheboygan County, Wisconsin
- In office January 1849 – January 1853
- Preceded by: William R. Gorsline
- Succeeded by: Edward Elwell

Member of the Michigan Senate from the 5th district
- In office January 1, 1838 – January 6, 1840

Personal details
- Born: December 3, 1805 Palatine, New York, U.S.
- Died: October 8, 1886 (aged 80) La Crosse, Wisconsin, U.S.
- Resting place: Oak Grove Cemetery, La Crosse, Wisconsin
- Party: Democratic

Elijah Fox Cook (December 3, 1805 – October 8, 1886) was an American lawyer, Democratic politician, and Wisconsin pioneer. He was the 3rd mayor of Sheboygan, Wisconsin, and represented Sheboygan County for two years in the Wisconsin Senate (1857 & 1858). Before arriving in Wisconsin, he also served two years in the Michigan State Senate (1838 & 1839) and served as a delegate to the constitutional convention which drafted the first Constitution of Michigan in 1835.

== Biography ==
Born in Palatine, New York, Cook moved to Oakland County, Michigan Territory, in 1831. He was admitted to the Michigan bar and practiced law in Farmington, and Pontiac. He served as a delegate to the Constitutional Convention of 1835 which drafted the first Constitution of Michigan. He went on to serve in the Michigan State Senate during the 1838 and 1839 sessions of the legislature.

In 1847, Cook moved to Sheboygan, Wisconsin Territory, and practiced law. Just after Wisconsin achieved statehood, he was elected to two consecutive terms as district attorney of Sheboygan County, serving from 1849 through 1853. During these years, he also promoted the Cascade & Lake Michigan Railroad Company, which planned to build a line from Sheboygan to the more inland village of Cascade.

In 1855, he was elected Mayor of Sheboygan, serving until his defeat in the 1858 election. Concurrent to his mayoral term, he was elected to the Wisconsin State Senate for the 1857 and 1858 sessions, defeating incumbent Republican David Taylor.

Subsequent to his Senate term, Cook moved to La Crosse, Wisconsin, where he practiced law for a few years. In 1862, he moved to Milwaukee. In March 1867, he slipped and broke his leg on a patch of icy sidewalk near his office, sustaining an injury that would leave him dependent on crutches for the rest of his life. He sued the city of Milwaukee for damages. Though he was initially successful in the circuit court, the city appealed to the Wisconsin Supreme Court and had the earlier decision vacated. Cook tried again, resulting in a similar outcome. Years later, Cook broke his leg again at the same place in Milwaukee, resulting in a paralysis of one side of his body that resulted in his retirement from his legal career.

After his retirement, he returned to La Crosse, where his daughter still resided. He died at his home in La Crosse in October 1886, at age 80.

== See also ==
- List of mayors of Sheboygan, Wisconsin

Wisconsin Senate
Preceded by David Taylor	Member of the Wisconsin Senate from the 1st district January 5, 1857 – January 3, 1859	Succeeded by Robert H. Hotchkiss
Political offices
Preceded by F. R. Townsend	Mayor of Sheboygan, Wisconsin; April 1855 – April 1858	Succeeded by William N. Shafter
Legal offices
Preceded by William R. Gorsline	District Attorney of Sheboygan County, Wisconsin; January 1849 – January 1853	Succeeded by Edward Elwell
