= John H. Jones (American politician) =

American politician (1836-1875)

Member of the Wisconsin Senate from the 1st district
- In office January 2, 1871 – January 6, 1873
- Preceded by: David Taylor
- Succeeded by: Patrick H. O'Rourk

District Attorney of Sheboygan County, Wisconsin
- In office November 1864 – January 1, 1871
- Appointed by: James T. Lewis
- Preceded by: Ellery B. Treat
- Succeeded by: Conrad Krez
- In office October 1862 – January 1, 1863
- Appointed by: Edward Salomon
- Preceded by: Conrad Krez
- Succeeded by: Ellery B. Treat

Personal details
- Born: February 28, 1836 Center Lisle, New York, U.S.
- Died: March 19, 1875 (aged 39) Sheboygan, Wisconsin, U.S.
- Resting place: Wildwood Cemetery, Sheboygan
- Party: Republican
- Spouse: Lucy Hannah Brown (m. 1858–1875)
- Children: Frances Lucy (Tallmadge)^{(b. 1860; died 1933)}; Charles Brown Jones^{(b. 1862; died 1897)}; John Howe Jones Jr.^{(b. 1874; died 1875)}
- Relatives: Charles S. Jones (brother)
- Profession: Lawyer

John Howe Jones Sr. (February 18, 1836 – March 19, 1875) was an American lawyer, Republican politician, and Wisconsin pioneer. He served two years in the Wisconsin Senate, representing Sheboygan County during the 1871 and 1872 terms. He also served 6 years as district attorney of Sheboygan County.

== Biography ==
John H. Jones was born in Center Lisle, Broome County, New York, in February 1836. He was a studious child, and at age 14 went to live with his elder brother, Charles S. Jones, who had recently established himself as a merchant in Coudersport, Pennsylvania. While living with his brother, he attended a local academy, but decided not to attend college. He instead chose to read law with attorney Arthur G. Olmsted in Coudersport. Jones was admitted to the bar the day after his 21st birthday, in February 1857.

That year, he set out for new opportunities in the west and settled in Sheboygan, Wisconsin. He worked as a junior law partner to former district attorney Crosby W. Ellis from 1857 to 1862.

In October 1862, Jones was appointed interim district attorney for Sheboygan County by governor Edward Salomon, after the resignation of the elected district attorney Conrad Krez. He served only briefly, with a new elected district attorney, Ellery B. Treat, taking office in 1863, but Treat also resigned early, and Jones was reappointed in the fall of 1864. That year, Jones ran for a full term as district attorney, on the National Union Party ticket, and won. He was re-elected in 1866 and 1868, running as a Republican.

In 1870, the Republican county convention unanimously nominated him as their candidate for Wisconsin Senate in the 1st Senate district, which then comprised all of Sheboygan County. In the general election, Jones defeated the Democratic candidate, former state senator Robert H. Hotchkiss, taking 53% of the vote.

He was pushed as a candidate for attorney general of Wisconsin in 1873, but did not formally enter that race. He suffered from declining health due to tuberculosis and went south to Kansas from winter 1873 to summer 1874. His health never recovered, and he died at his home in Sheboygan on March 19, 1875, at age 39.

== Personal life and family ==
John H. Jones was the last of at least seven children born to Levi Jones (1793–1856) and his first wife Fanny (née Storrs; 1797–1848). Levi Jones was a prominent citizen in Broome County, New York, and served several years as associate judge of the county.

John's elder brothers Frank Lavosieur Jones and Charles Storrs Jones became prominent in business and politics in Potter County, Pennsylvania.

John Jones' maternal ancestors were descendants of Samuel Storrs, who emigrated from England to the Massachusetts Bay Colony in 1663.

John Jones married Lucy Hannah Brown (1842–1918) on November 9, 1858. Lucy was born in Milwaukee and came to Sheboygan County with her parents; her father was a church deacon and well respected among the early settlers. John and Lucy had at least three children together, though their youngest child died in infancy.
