= Luther H. Cary =

American politician (1823–1888)

Member of the California State Assembly from the Alameda County district
- In office January 1883 – January 1885

Member of the Wisconsin Senate from the 1st district
- In office January 7, 1861 – January 5, 1863
- Preceded by: Robert H. Hotchkiss
- Succeeded by: John E. Thomas

Member of the Wisconsin State Assembly
- In office January 7, 1867 – January 6, 1868
- Preceded by: Joseph Wagner
- Succeeded by: Seth A. Chase
- Constituency: Fond du Lac 4th district
- In office January 1, 1855 – January 7, 1856
- Preceded by: John Mathes
- Succeeded by: Reed C. Brazelton
- Constituency: Sheboygan 2nd district

Personal details
- Born: June 28, 1823 Erie County, New York, U.S.
- Died: September 16, 1888 (aged 65) Oakland, California, U.S.
- Resting place: Mountain View Cemetery, Oakland
- Party: Republican
- Spouse: Arvilla Ferguson (m. 1846–1888)
- Children: Eugene Cary^{(b. 1852; died 1856)}; Florence E. (Ziegenfuss)^{(b. 1860; died 1951)}; Louis Harvey Cary^{(b. 1865; died 1923)}
- Relatives: Amzi Beriah Cary (brother); Eugene Cary (brother)
- Education: Geneva Medical College
- Profession: Physician

Military service
- Allegiance: United States
- Branch/service: United States Volunteers; Union Army
- Years of service: 1861–1863
- Rank: Surgeon
- Unit: 12th Reg. Wis. Vol. Infantry
- Battles/wars: American Civil War

Luther Harvey Cary Jr. (June 28, 1823 – September 16, 1888) was an American medical doctor, Republican politician, and pioneer of Wisconsin and California. He served two years in the Wisconsin Senate (1861, 1862) and two years in the Wisconsin State Assembly, representing Sheboygan County (1855) and Fond du Lac County (1867). After moving to California, he also served two years in the California State Assembly (1883, 1884). During the American Civil War, he served as a Union Army surgeon with the 12th Wisconsin Infantry Regiment.

== Biography ==
Luther Cary was born Luther Harvey Cary in Erie County, New York, in 1824. After completing his primary education, he taught school in Boston, New York. He used his earnings to attend Geneva Medical College, where he graduated in 1846.

He moved to the town of Greenbush, in Sheboygan County, Wisconsin, where he established a medical practice. Running on the Republican Party ticket, he was elected in 1854 to represent western Sheboygan County in the Wisconsin State Assembly in the 1855 term. He was then elected to a two year term in the Wisconsin Senate in 1860, representing all of Sheboygan County.

While serving in the Senate in 1861, Cary also volunteered to serve as surgeon with the 12th Wisconsin Infantry Regiment in the American Civil War, bringing along his brother Amzi Beriah Cary as 1st assistant surgeon. Unlike many other politicians turned Union Army volunteers, Cary did not resign his political office, as the timing of the legislative floor sessions and the 12th Wisconsin's deployment enabled him to assist in the organizing of the regiment in the fall of 1861, complete his legislative duties in the winter of 1861–1862, then join the regiment in Kansas in the spring. Due to his duties, however, he was absent from the Senate for the summer and fall special sessions. His brother died of disease in the fall of 1862. In 1863, Cary was detailed to serve as medical inspector for XVI Corps, where he remained until mustering out in June 1863.

He was subsequently elected as a delegate to the 1864 Republican National Convention.

After the war, Cary moved to Fond du Lac County, Wisconsin, and was elected to another term in the Wisconsin State Assembly in 1866, representing part of the city of Fond du Lac.

In 1868, Cary moved west to San Jose, California, where he established a medical practice. In 1873, however, he received a federal appointment from U.S. President Ulysses S. Grant, and served as inspector of the San Francisco Revenue District. He moved to Oakland, California, to accept that role, and remained there for the rest of his life. During his time in Oakland, he also served as city health officer and surgeon of San Quentin State Prison.

In 1882, he was elected to a two-year term in the California State Assembly, representing Alameda County from 1883 to 1885.

Cary traveled to Chicago with the California delegation to the 1888 Republican National Convention, though he was not a formal delegate. He became ill on his return trip, and never recovered. He died on September 16, 1888, at his home in Oakland.

== Personal life and family ==
Luther H. Cary Jr. was the 2nd of at least 8 children born to Luther H. Cary Sr. (1800–1874) and Lucy (née Doolittle; 1794–1870). Aside from his brother, Amzi, who served with him and died of disease in the Civil War, another of Cary's younger brothers, Eugene Cary, also served as an officer in the Civil War and went on to a notable career as a lawyer, politician, and judge in Wisconsin, Tennessee, and finally Chicago.

The Cary family were descendants of the colonist John Cary, who emigrated from England to the Plymouth Colony in the 1630s and was possibly the first Latin school teacher in the colony. John Cary was a member of the Cary family of English aristocrats. Luther Cary's Wisconsin contemporary John W. Cary was a second-cousin once-removed, with their last common ancestor being Jabez Cary (1691–1760).

Luther Cary married Arvilla Ferguson at Boston, New York, in September 1846. They had three children together, though their first son died in childhood.
