= David Taylor (Wisconsin judge) =

American lawyer and judge (1818–1891)

The Honorable David Taylor
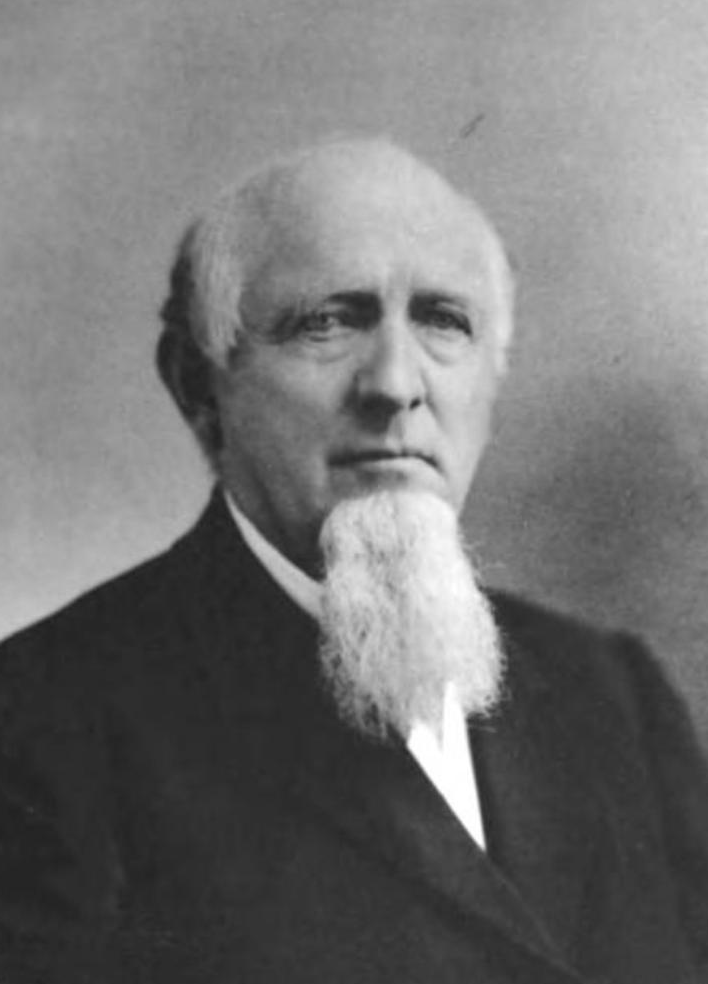

Associate Justice of the Wisconsin Supreme Court
- In office April 18, 1878 – April 3, 1891
- Preceded by: New Seat
- Succeeded by: John B. Winslow

Wisconsin Circuit Court Judge for the 4th Circuit
- In office July 1, 1858 – December 31, 1868
- Appointed by: Alexander Randall
- Preceded by: William R. Gorsline
- Succeeded by: Campbell McLean

Member of the Wisconsin Senate from the 1st district
- In office January 4, 1869 – January 2, 1871
- Preceded by: Robert H. Hotchkiss
- Succeeded by: John H. Jones
- In office January 1, 1855 – January 5, 1857
- Preceded by: Horatio N. Smith
- Succeeded by: Elijah Fox Cook

Member of the Wisconsin State Assembly from the Sheboygan 1st district
- In office January 3, 1853 – January 2, 1854
- Preceded by: James McMillan Shafter
- Succeeded by: Adolph Rosenthal

District Attorney of Sheboygan County, Wisconsin Territory
- In office January 1, 1847 – January 1, 1848
- Preceded by: D. U. Harrington
- Succeeded by: John Sharpstein

Personal details
- Born: March 11, 1818 Carlisle, New York, U.S.
- Died: April 3, 1891 (aged 73) Madison, Wisconsin, U.S.
- Cause of death: Heart attack
- Resting place: Wildwood Cemetery, Sheboygan, Wisconsin
- Party: Republican; Whig (before 1854)
- Spouses: Mary Salome Calender; (died 1898)
- Children: Mary Esther (McDonnell)^{(b. 1860; died 1952)}; Alma (Roys)^{(b. 1876; died 1974)}; Jerry Taylor; Alice Taylor; David Taylor; 1 other son
- Education: Union College
- Occupation: lawyer, politician, judge

David W. Taylor (March 11, 1818 – April 3, 1891) was an American attorney, judge, and Republican politician. He was a justice of the Wisconsin Supreme Court for the last 13 years of his life (1878–1891). Previously, he served ten years as a Wisconsin circuit court judge; he also served four years as a member of the Wisconsin Senate and one year in the state Assembly, representing Sheboygan County.

== Early life ==
Born in Carlisle, New York, Taylor graduated from Union College in 1841 and was admitted to the New York Bar at Cobleskill, in 1844. He practiced law in New York for two years before moving to the Wisconsin Territory in 1846.

== Career ==
Taylor first visited Milwaukee and Green Bay, but decided to settle in Sheboygan. He arrived in Sheboygan by boat, on the same ship that brought Harrison Carroll Hobart—the two men would establish the first legal firms in the city. Taylor partnered with Cyrus Hiller, creating a firm known as Taylor & Hiller. That fall, he was elected district attorney of Sheboygan County for a one-year term.

In 1852, he was elected from Sheboygan County's 1st district to the Wisconsin State Assembly for the 1853 legislative session. At this time, he was a member of the Whig Party, but would soon after become a member of the newly established Republican Party. In his one term in the Assembly, Taylor served on the committee for education, schools, and university lands, the committee on state affairs, and the committee on finance. Taylor was renominated by the Whig Party for another term in the Assembly, but was defeated by Democrat Adolph Rosenthal.

In 1854, he was elected to the Wisconsin State Senate as a Republican. During the 1855 session of the legislature, Taylor made an inquiry into the meaning of a number of disbursement payments to the then-Governor William A. Barstow. As a result, and possibly as an attempt to deter or embarrass Taylor, the Democratic majority offered to make him a committee of one to investigate the matter. Taylor researched the matter and concluded that Barstow had improperly claimed $600 (approximately $17,000 adjusted for inflation to 2021). The investigation added to a building narrative about corruption in the Barstow administration, and Barstow was ultimately narrowly defeated in the 1855 gubernatorial election. The report also made Taylor a Democratic target for retribution and personal grudges for the rest of his career. He did not seek renomination to another term in the Senate in 1856.

At the 1857 Republican State Convention, his name was placed in nomination for Governor of Wisconsin, amidst the rivalry between Edward D. Holton and Walter D. McIndoe. Ultimately, Alexander Randall was chosen as the consensus alternative. Less than a year later, on the resignation of Judge William R. Gorsline, Governor Randall appointed Taylor as Wisconsin circuit court judge for the 4th circuit. At the time, the 4th circuit comprised Calumet, Fond du Lac, Manitowoc, and Sheboygan counties. The following April, Judge Taylor defeated a challenge from Isaac S. Tallmadge in an election to fill the remainder of Judge Gorsline's term. He was subsequently re-elected without opposition in 1862. In 1868, Judge Taylor ran for a second six-year term but was defeated by Democrat Campbell McLean. Taylor's defeat was considered a major upset, as McLean was a lawyer of little significance who had served a term in the Assembly. Taylor was likely hurt among the German American population by his recent opposition to Sunday laws in Wisconsin.

Undaunted, that fall he entered the race to reclaim his seat in the Wisconsin State Senate. Though he won the election, his seat was immediately contested on the grounds that he could not legally receive votes for a legislative seat while serving as a circuit court judge (his judicial term technically did not expire until December 1868). A formal complaint was introduced by Democratic Senator Edward S. Bragg in the first weeks of the new legislative session. After a brief hearing in the Senate Judiciary Committee, Senator Taylor's victory was certified and he was allowed to resume his duties. By far, Taylor's most significant legislative achievement of this term was his leadership in the passage of two resolutions, which led to the abolition of the grand jury system in Wisconsin.

=== Revised Statutes ===
Taylor did not seek re-election in 1870 and instead set to work on a new compilation of the statutes of Wisconsin with annotations relating to relevant judicial case law. Taylor had been appointed to a commission in 1857 which had produced the last compilation of the statutes. He published his compilation in 1871 in a 2,200-page compendium commonly referred to as Taylor's Statutes. When the state found it necessary to produce an updated version in 1875, the Wisconsin Supreme Court chose Judge Taylor as president of the commission managing the new compilation. In the meantime, Judge Taylor relocated from Sheboygan to Fond du Lac, Wisconsin, and formed a new law partnership, first with J. M. Gillet, and then with George Eaton Sutherland.

=== Supreme Court ===
In 1878, the Wisconsin Supreme Court was set to expand from three seats to five, due to a constitutional amendment approved in 1877. A pre-determined compromise ensured that both new seats would be uncontested—the Democrats and Republicans would each choose one candidate to stand unopposed. Judge Taylor was promptly nominated by a conference of Republican state legislators as their candidate. He was elected alongside Democrat Harlow S. Orton without opposition. He was re-elected to a ten-year term in 1885, without serious opposition.

Judge Taylor worked until the day of his death. He died of a sudden heart attack on April 3, 1891, after eating dinner at his home on West Wilson Street in Madison, Wisconsin.

== Family and legacy ==
He married Mary Salome Calender (1828–1898), with whom he had six children.

Much of his former estate in Sheboygan, Wisconsin, is now known as "Taylor Park" and is maintained by the Sheboygan County Historical Museum. The museum operates out of his former home within the park—known as the David Taylor House, it is listed in the National Register of Historic Places.

== Electoral history ==
=== Wisconsin Circuit Court (1859, 1862, 1868) ===
Wisconsin Circuit Court, 4th Circuit Election, 1868
Party	Candidate	Votes	%	±%
General Election, April 7, 1868
Democratic	Campbell McLean	9,171	52.92%	
Republican	David Taylor (incumbent)	8,157	47.07%	
	Scattering	1	0.01%	
Plurality		1,014	5.85%	
Total votes		17,329	100.0%	
Democratic gain from Republican				

=== Wisconsin Senate (1868) ===
Wisconsin Senate, 1st District Election, 1868
Party	Candidate	Votes	%	±%
General Election, November 3, 1868
Republican	David Taylor	3,056	55.52%	
Democratic	Otto Puhlman	2,448	44.48%	
Plurality		608	11.05%	
Total votes		5,504	100.0%	
Republican gain from Democratic				

=== Wisconsin Supreme Court (1878, 1885) ===
1885 Wisconsin Supreme Court election
Party	Candidate	Votes	%	±%
General Election, April 7, 1885
Nonpartisan	David Taylor (incumbent)	192,324	98.91%	
Nonpartisan	Levi M. Vilas	2,018	1.04%	
	Scattering	99	0.05%	
Plurality		190,306	97.87%	
Total votes		194,441	100.0%	

== Published works ==
- Taylor, David (1871). The Revised Statutes of the State of Wisconsin. Chicago: E. B. Myers & Co.

== See also ==
- David Taylor House

Wisconsin State Assembly
Preceded by James McMillan Shafter	Member of the Wisconsin State Assembly from the Sheboygan 1st district January 12, 1853 – January 11, 1854	Succeeded by Adolph Rosenthal
Wisconsin Senate
Preceded by Horatio N. Smith	Member of the Wisconsin Senate from the 1st district January 10, 1855 – January 14, 1857	Succeeded by Elijah Fox Cook
Preceded by Robert H. Hotchkiss	Member of the Wisconsin Senate from the 1st district January 13, 1869 – January 11, 1871	Succeeded by John H. Jones
Legal offices
Preceded by D. U. Harrington	District Attorney of Sheboygan County, Wisconsin Territory; January 1, 1847 – January 1, 1848	Succeeded by John Sharpstein
Preceded by William R. Gorsline	Wisconsin Circuit Court Judge for the 4th Circuit; July 1, 1858 – December 31, 1868	Succeeded by Campbell McLean
New seat	Associate Justice of the Wisconsin Supreme Court; April 18, 1878 – April 3, 1891	Succeeded by John B. Winslow
