= Center Lisle, New York =

- Hamlet
- Location within New York
- Coordinates: 42°21′30″N 76°03′42″W
- Country: United States
- State: New York
- County: Broome
- Town: Lisle
- Elevation: 1,083 ft (330 m)
- Time zone: UTC-5 (Eastern (EST))
  - Summer (DST): UTC-4 (EDT)
- ZIP Code: 13797 (Lisle)
- Area code: 607
- GNIS feature ID: 946196

Center Lisle (also Centre Lisle, Yorkshire) is a hamlet in the town of Lisle in Broome County, New York, United States.

== Notable person ==
- John H. Jones, Wisconsin State Senator and lawyer, was born in Center Lisle.
