= List of law enforcement agencies in Wisconsin =

This is a list of law enforcement agencies in the state of Wisconsin.

According to the US Bureau of Justice Statistics' 2008 Census of State and Local Law Enforcement Agencies, the state had 529 law enforcement agencies employing 13,730 sworn police officers, about 186 for each 100,000 residents.

== State agencies ==
- Wisconsin Capitol Police
- Wisconsin Department of Corrections
- Wisconsin Department of Justice
- Wisconsin Department of Natural Resources
  - Division of Forestry
    - Foresters, Forester-Rangers
  - Division of Enforcement and Science; Bureau of Law Enforcement
    - Conservation Wardens, Deputy Conservation Wardens
- Wisconsin Department of Transportation
  - Wisconsin State Patrol
    - Troopers, Inspectors
- Wisconsin State Fair Park Police Department

== County agencies ==
- Adams County Sheriff's Office
- Ashland County Sheriff's Office
- Barron County Sheriff's Office
- Bayfield County Sheriff's Office
- Brown County Sheriff's Office
- Buffalo County Sheriff's Office
- Burnett County Sheriff's Office
- Calumet County Sheriff's Office
- Chippewa County Sheriff's Office
- Clark County Sheriff's Office
- Columbia County Sheriff's Office
- Crawford County Sheriff's Office
- Dane County Sheriff's Office
- Dodge County Sheriff's Office
- Door County Sheriff's Office
- Douglas County Sheriff's Office
- Dunn County Sheriff's Office
- Eau Claire County Sheriff's Office
- Florence County Sheriff's Office
- Fond du Lac County Sheriff's Office
- Forest County Sheriff's Office
- Grant County Sheriff's Office
- Green County Sheriff's Office
- Green Lake County Sheriff's Office
- Iowa County Sheriff's Office
- Iron County Sheriff's Office
- Jackson County Sheriff's Office
- Jefferson County Sheriff's Office
- Juneau County Sheriff's Office
- Kenosha County Sheriff's Office
- Kewaunee County Sheriff's Office
- La Crosse County Sheriff's Office
- Lafayette County Sheriff's Office
- Langlade County Sheriff's Office
- Lincoln County Sheriff's Office
- Manitowoc County Sheriff's Office
- Marathon County Sheriff's Office
- Marinette County Sheriff's Office
- Marquette County Sheriff's Office
- Menominee County Sheriff's Office
- Milwaukee County Sheriff's Office
- Monroe County Sheriff's Office
- Oconto County Sheriff's Office
- Oneida County Sheriff's Office
- Outagamie County Sheriff's Office
- Ozaukee County Sheriff's Office
- Pepin County Sheriff's Office
- Pierce County Sheriff's Office
- Polk County Sheriff's Office
- Portage County Sheriff's Office
- Price County Sheriff's Office
- Racine County Sheriff's Office
- Richland County Sheriff's Office
- Rock County Sheriff's Office
- Rusk County Sheriff's Office
- Saint Croix County Sheriff's Office
- Sauk County Sheriff's Office
- Sawyer County Sheriff's Office
- Shawano County Sheriff's Office
- Sheboygan County Sheriff's Office
- Taylor County Sheriff's Office
- Trempealeau County Sheriff's Office
- Vernon County Sheriff's Office
- Vilas County Sheriff's Office
- Walworth County Sheriff's Office
- Washburn County Sheriff's Office
- Washington County Sheriff's Office
- Waukesha County Sheriff's Office
- Waupaca County Sheriff's Office
- Waushara County Sheriff's Office
- Winnebago County Sheriff's Office
- Wood County Sheriff's Office

== Municipal agencies ==
- Adams Police Department
- Albany Police Department
- Algoma Police Department
- Alma Police Department
- Alma Center Police Department
- Almena Police Department
- Altoona Police Department
- Amery Police Department
- Antigo Police Department
- Appleton Police Department
- Arcadia Police Department
- Arena Police Department
- Argyle Police Department
- Ashland Police Department
- Ashwaubenon Police Department
- Athens Police Department
- Augusta Police Department
- Avoca Police Department
- Baldwin Police Department
- Balsam Lake Police Department
- Bangor Police Department
- Baraboo Police Department
- Barneveld Police Department
- Barron Police Department
- Bayside Police Department
- Belleville Police Department
- Belmont Police Department
- Beloit Police Department
- Berlin Police Department
- Big Bend Police Department
- Birchwood Police Department
- Birnamwood Police Department
- Black River Falls Police Department
- Blair Police Department
- Blanchardville Police Department
- Bloomer Police Department
- Bloomfield Police Department
- Blue Mounds Police Department
- Bonduel Police Department
- Boscobel Police Department
- Boulder Junction Police Department
- Boyceville Police Department
- Boyd Police Department
- Brandon Police Department
- Brillion Police Department
- Brodhead Police Department
- Brookfield Police Department
- Brooklyn Police Department
- Brown Deer Police Department
- Brownsville Police Department
- Burlington Police Department (City of Burlington)
- Burlington Police Department (Town of Burlington)
- Butler Police Department
- Cadott Police Department
- Caledonia Police Department
- Cambria Police Department
- Cambridge Police Department
- Cameron Police Department
- Camp Douglas Police Department
- Campbell Police Department
- Campbellsport Police Department
- Cascade Police Department
- Cashton Police Department
- Cassville Police Department
- Cedarburg Police Department
- Centuria Police Department
- Chaseburg Police Department
- Chetek Police Department
- Chilton Police Department
- Chippewa Falls Police Department
- Clayton Police Department
- Clear Lake Police Department
- Cleveland Police Department
- Clinton Police Department
- Clintonville Police Department
- Clyman Police Department
- Colby-Abbotsford Police Department
- Coleman Police Department
- Colfax Police Department
- Coloma Police Department
- Columbus Police Department
- Combined Locks Police Department
- Coon Valley Police Department
- Cornell Police Department
- Cottage Grove Police Department
- Crandon Police Department
- Crivitz Police Department
- Cross Plains Police Department
- Cuba City Police Department
- Cudahy Police Department
- Cumberland Police Department
- Dane Police Department
- Darlington Police Department
- De Pere Police Department
- Deforest Police Department
- Delafield Police Department
- Delavan Police Department (City of Delavan)
- Delavan Police Department (Town of Delavan)
- Denmark Police Department
- Dickeyville Police Department
- Dodgeville Police Department
- Dorchester Police Department
- Dousman Police Department
- Dresser Police Department
- Durand Police Department
- Eagle Police Department
- Eagle River Police Department
- East Troy Police Department
- Eau Claire Police Department
- Edgar Police Department
- Edgerton Police Department
- Eleva Police Department
- Elk Mound Police Department
- Elkhart Lake Police Department
- Elkhorn Police Department
- Ellsworth Police Department
- Elm Grove Police Department
- Elmwood Police Department
- Elroy Police Department
- Endeavor Police Department
- Ettrick Police Department
- Evansville Police Department
- Everest Metropolitan Police Department
- Fairchild Police Department
- Fall Creek Police Department
- Fall River Police Department
- Fennimore Police Department
- Ferryville Police Department
- Fitchburg Police Department
- Fond du Lac City Police Department
- Fontana Police Department
- Fort Atkinson Police Department
- Fountain City Police Department
- Fox Crossing Police Department
- Fox Point Police Department
- Fox Valley Metro Police Department
- Franklin Police Department
- Frederic Police Department
- Fredonia Police Department
- Freedom Police Department
- Fremont Police Department
- Galesville Police Department
- Genoa City Police Department
- Germantown Police Department
- Gillett Police Department
- Gilman Police Department
- Glenbeulah Police Department
- Glendale Police Department
- Glenwood City Police Department
- Grafton Police Department
- Grand Chute Police Department
- Grantsburg Police Department
- Green Bay Police Department
- Green Lake Police Department
- Greendale Police Department
- Greenfield Police Department
- Greenwood Police Department
- Hales Corners Police Department
- Hammond Police Department
- Hartford Police Department
- Hartland Police Department
- Hayward Police Department (City of Hayward)
- Hayward Police Department (Town of Hayward)
- Hazel Green Police Department
- Highland Police Department
- Hillsboro Police Department
- Holmen Police Department
- Horicon Police Department
- Hortonville Police Department
- Hudson Police Department
- Hurley Police Department
- Hustisford Police Department
- Independence Police Department
- Iola Police Department
- Iron Ridge Police Department
- Iron River Police Department
- Jackson Police Department
- Janesville Police Department
- Jefferson Police Department
- Johnson Creek Police Department
- Juneau Police Department
- Kaukauna Police Department
- Kendall Police Department
- Kenosha Police Department
- Kewaskum Police Department
- Kewaunee Police Department
- Kiel Police Department
- Kohler Police Department
- Kronenwetter Police Department
- Lac La Belle Police Department (Formerly Town of Oconomowoc Police)
- La Crosse Police Department
- La Farge Police Department
- La Pointe Police Department
- La Valle Police Department
- Ladysmith Police Department
- Lake Delton Police Department
- Lake Geneva Police Department
- Lake Hallie Police Department
- Lake Mills Police Department
- Lake Nebagamon Police Department
- Lancaster Police Department
- Lannon Police Department
- Laona Police Department
- Lena Police Department
- Linden Police Department
- Livingston Police Department
- Lodi Police Department
- Lomira Police Department
- Lone Rock Police Department
- Lowell Police Department
- Loyal Police Department
- Luck Police Department
- Luxemburg Police Department
- Lyndon Station Police Department
- Madison Police Department
- Manawa Police Department
- Manitowish Waters Police Department
- Manitowoc Police Department
- Marathon City Police Department
- Marinette Police Department
- Markesan Police Department
- Marshall Police Department
- Marshfield Police Department
- Mattoon Police Department
- Mauston Police Department
- Mayville Police Department
- McFarland Police Department
- Medford Police Department
- Mellen Police Department
- Melrose Police Department
- Menasha Police Department
- Menomonee Falls Police Department
- Menomonie Police Department
- Mequon Police Department
- Merrill Police Department
- Merrillan Police Department
- Middleton Police Department
- Milltown Police Department
- Milton Police Department
- Milwaukee Police Department
- Mineral Point Police Department
- Minocqua Police Department
- Minong Police Department
- Mishicot Police Department
- Mondovi Police Department
- Monona Police Department
- Monroe Police Department
- Monticello Police Department
- Mosinee Police Department
- Mount Horeb Police Department
- Mount Pleasant Police Department
- Mukwonago Police Department (Town of Mukwonago)
- Mukwonago Police Department (Village of Mukwonago)
- Muscoda Police Department
- Muskego Police Department
- Nashotah Police Department
- Necedah Police Department
- Neenah Police Department
- Neillsville Police Department
- Nekoosa Police Department
- Neosho Rubicon Ashippun Police Department
- Neshkoro Police Department
- New Berlin Police Department
- New Glarus Police Department
- New Holstein Police Department
- New Lisbon Police Department
- New London Police Department
- New Richmond Police Department
- Newburg Police Department
- Niagara Police Department
- North Fond du Lac Police Department
- North Prairie Police Department
- Norwalk Police Department
- Norway Police Department
- Oak Creek Police Department
- Oakfield Police Department
- Oconomowoc Lake Police Department
- Oconto Police Department
- Oconto Falls Police Department
- Omro Police Department
- Onalaska Police Department
- Oneida Police Department
- Ontario Police Department
- Oregon Police Department
- Orfordville Police Department
- Osceola Police Department
- Oshkosh Police Department
- Osseo Police Department
- Owen Police Department
- Oxford Police Department
- Palmyra Police Department
- Park Falls Police Department
- Pepin Police Department
- Peshtigo Police Department
- Pewaukee Police Department
- Phillips Police Department
- Pittsville Police Department
- Plain Police Department
- Platteville Police Department
- Pleasant Prairie Police Department
- Plover Police Department
- Plum City Police Department
- Plymouth Police Department
- Port Edwards Police Department
- Port Washington Police Department
- Portage Police Department
- Potosi Police Department
- Poynette Police Department
- Prairie du Chien Police Department
- Prescott Police Department
- Princeton Police Department
- Pulaski Police Department
- Racine Police Department
- Randolph Police Department
- Readstown Police Department
- Redgranite Police Department
- Reedsburg Police Department
- Reedsville Police Department
- Reeseville Police Department
- Rewey Police Department
- Rhinelander Police Department
- Rib Lake Police Department
- Rice Lake Police Department
- Richland Center Police Department
- Ridgeway Police Department
- Rio Police Department
- Ripon Police Department (City of Ripon)
- Ripon Police Department (Town of Ripon)
- River Falls Police Department
- River Hills Police Department
- Roberts Police Department
- Rome Police Department
- Rosendale Police Department
- Rothschild Police Department
- Sand Creek Police Department
- Sauk Prairie Police Department
- Saukville Police Department
- Seymour Police Department
- Sharon Police Department
- Shawano Police Department
- Sheboygan Police Department
- Sheboygan Falls Police Department
- Shelby Police Department
- Shell Lake Police Department
- Shiocton Police Department
- Shorewood Police Department
- Shorewood Hills Police Department
- Shullsburg Police Department
- Silver Lake Police Department
- Siren Police Department
- Slinger Police Department
- Soldiers Grove Police Department
- Solon Springs Police Department
- Somerset Police Department
- South Milwaukee Police Department
- South Wayne Police Department
- Sparta Police Department
- Spencer Police Department
- Spooner Police Department
- Spring Green Police Department
- Spring Valley Police Department
- St. Croix Falls Police Department
- St. Francis Police Department
- St. Nazianz Police Department
- Stanley Police Department
- Star Prairie Police Department
- Stevens Point Police Department
- Stoddard Police Department
- Stoughton Police Department
- Stratford Police Department
- Strum Police Department
- Sturgeon Bay Police Department
- Sturtevant Police Department
- Suamico Police Department
- Summit Police Department
- Sun Prairie Police Department
- Superior Police Department
- Suring Police Department
- Taylor Police Department
- Theresa Police Department
- Thiensville Police Department
- Thorp Police Department
- Three Lakes Police Department
- Tigerton Police Department
- Tomah Police Department
- Tomahawk Police Department
- Town of Madison Police Department
- Townsend Police Department
- Trempealeau Police Department
- Trenton Police Department
- Turtle Lake Police Department
- Twin Lakes Police Department
- Two Rivers Police Department
- Union Center Police Department
- Valders Police Department
- Verona Police Department
- Vesper Police Department
- Viola Police Department
- Viroqua Police Department
- Wabeno Police Department
- Walworth Police Department
- Washburn Police Department
- Waterford Police Department (Town of Waterford)
- Waterford Police Department (Village of Waterford)
- Waterloo Police Department
- Watertown Police Department
- Waukesha Police Department
- Waunakee Police Department
- Waupaca Police Department
- Waupun Police Department
- Wausau Police Department
- Wautoma Police Department
- Wauwatosa Police Department
- Webb Lake Police Department
- Webster Police Department
- West Allis Police Department
- West Bend Police Department
- West Milwaukee Police Department
- West Salem Police Department
- Westby Police Department
- Westfield Police Department
- Weyauwega Police Department
- Wheeler Police Department
- Whitefish Bay Police Department
- Whitehall Police Department
- Whitewater Police Department
- Wild Rose Police Department
- Williams Bay Police Department
- Wilton Police Department
- Wind Point Police Department
- Winneconne Police Department
- Wisconsin Dells Police Department
- Wisconsin Rapids Police Department
- Wonewoc Police Department
- Woodruff Police Department
- Woodville Police Department
- Wyocena Police Department

== College and university agencies ==
- Marquette University Police Department
- University of Wisconsin - Eau Claire Police Department
- University of Wisconsin - Green Bay Police Department
- University of Wisconsin - La Crosse Police Department
- University of Wisconsin - Madison Police Department
- University of Wisconsin - Milwaukee Police Department
- University of Wisconsin - Oshkosh Police Department
- University of Wisconsin - Parkside Police Department
- University of Wisconsin - Platteville Police Department
- University of Wisconsin - River Falls Public Safety Department
- University of Wisconsin - Stevens Point Protective Services
- University of Wisconsin - Stout Police Department
- University of Wisconsin - Superior Campus Safety Office
- University of Wisconsin - Whitewater Police Services Department

== Tribal Law Enforcement Agencies ==
- Lac Courte Oreilles Tribal Police Department
- Lac Du Flambeau Tribal Police Department
- Menominee Tribal Police Department
