= Milwaukee County Sheriff's Office =

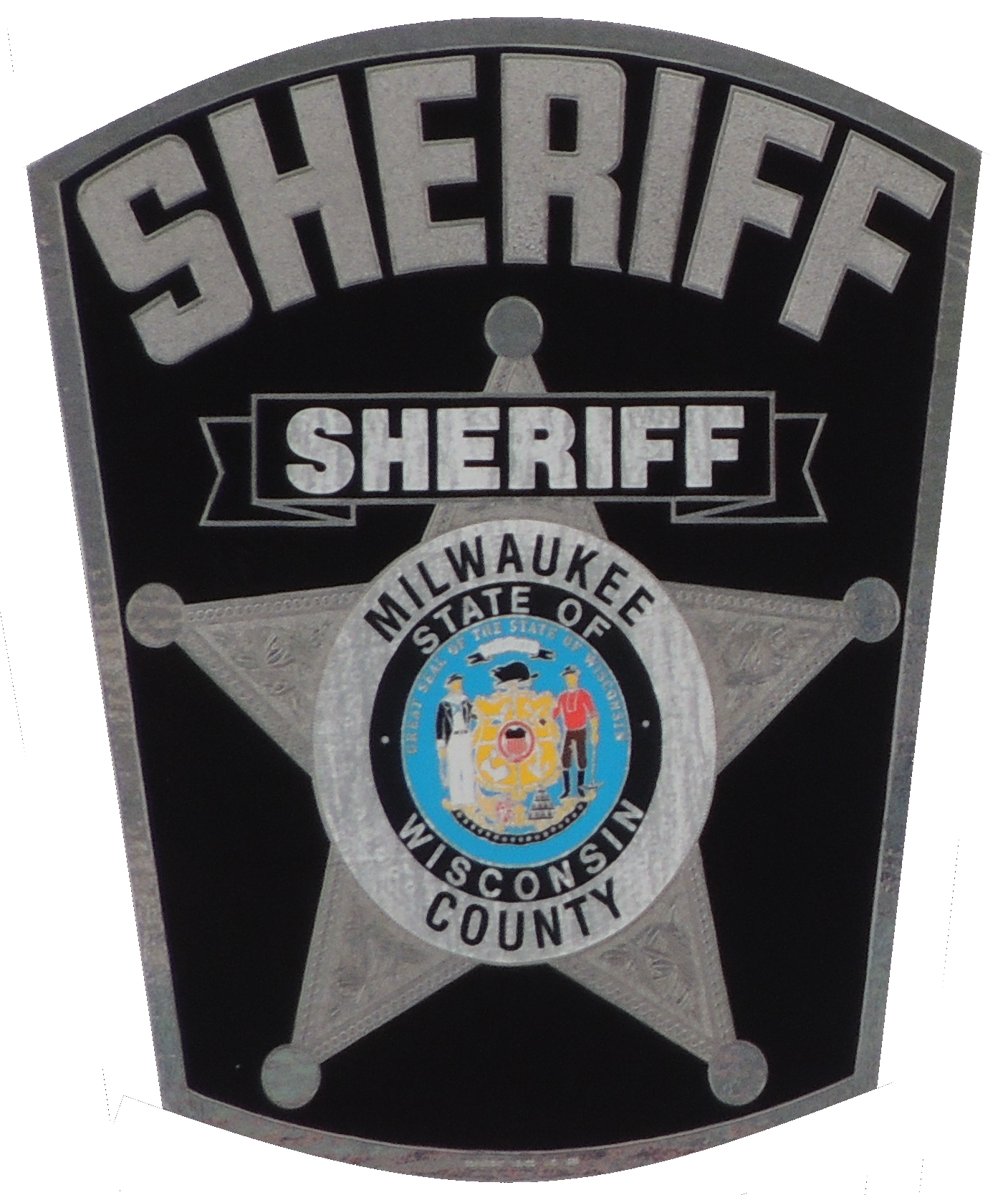
- Patch of the Milwaukee County Sheriff's Office

- Badge of the Milwaukee County Sheriff's Office
- Common name: Milwaukee County Sheriff
- Abbreviation: MCSO
- Motto: "We Are Held To A Higher Standard...And We Ought To Be Proud"

Agency overview
- Formed: 1835; 191 years ago
- Employees: 550
- Annual budget: 50 million

Jurisdictional structure
- Operations jurisdiction: United States
- Area: 1190 mi
- Population: 950,000
- Legal jurisdiction: Milwaukee County, Wisconsin
- General nature: Local civilian police

Operational structure
- Headquarters: 821 W State Street; Milwaukee, Wisconsin; United States
- Deputies: 288
- Civilian employees: 240
- Sheriff responsible: Sheriff Denita Ball
- Agency executive: Chief Deputy, Brian Barkow
- Bureaus: 4: Administrative Services Bureau; Detention Bureau; Police Services Bureau; Criminal Investigations Bureau

Facilities
- Stations: 5
- Boats: 2
- Drones: 4
- K9s: 12

Website
- county.milwaukee.gov

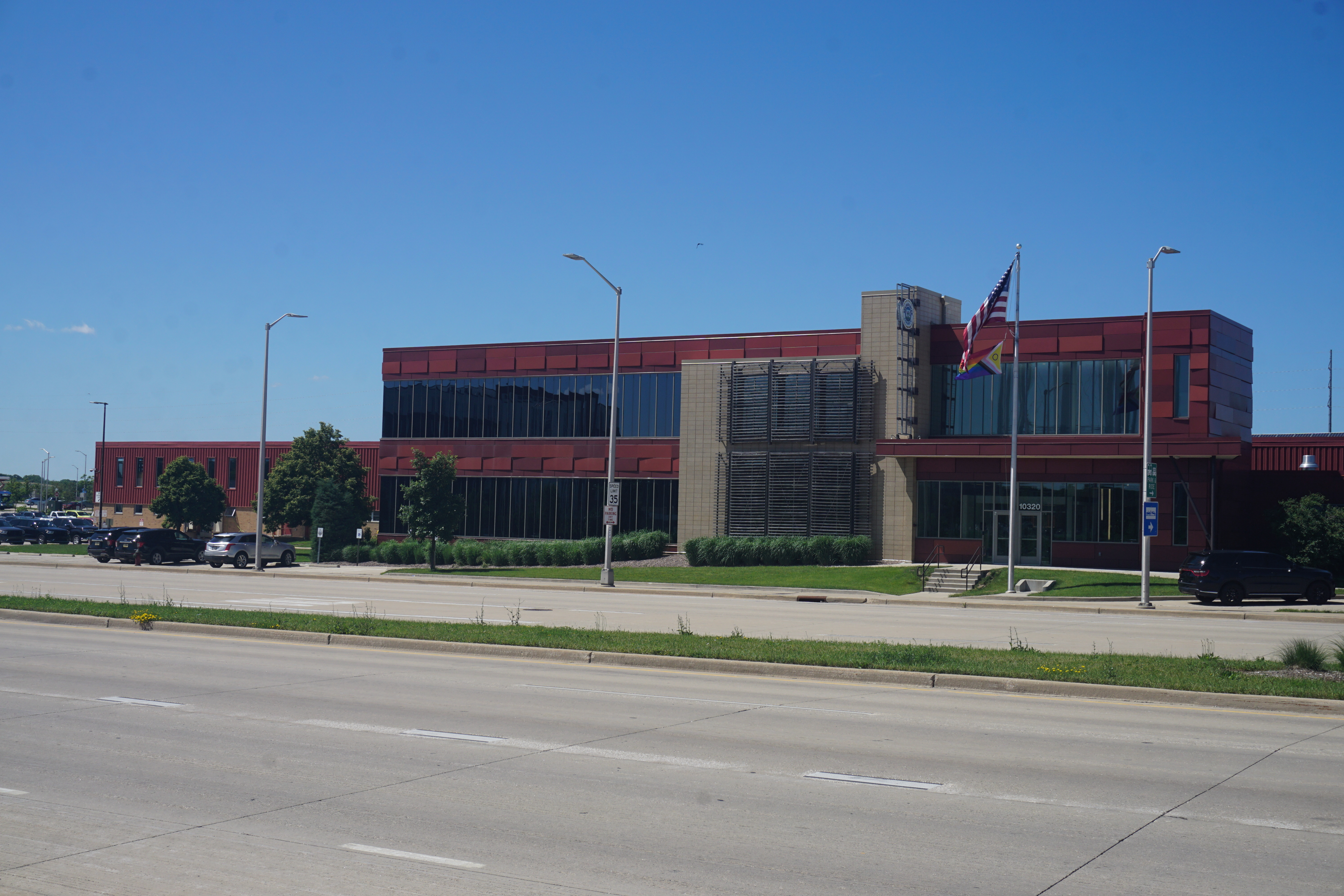
The Milwaukee County Sheriff Patrol Bureau in Wauwatosa, Wisconsin

The Milwaukee County Sheriff's Office is the principal law enforcement agency that serves Milwaukee County, Wisconsin. It provides law enforcement services for the county's freeways and outlying lettered County Trunk Highways, the Milwaukee County Courthouse, the Milwaukee County Criminal Justice Facility and House of Corrections, the county-owned Milwaukee Mitchell International Airport, and the Milwaukee County Parks system, including all of the Milwaukee County lakefront. Unique among Wisconsin counties, Milwaukee County is fully incorporated (i.e.: all of the county's land is part of an incorporated municipality - of which there are 19). Hence there are no unincorporated sections requiring basic policing service from the Sheriff's Office.

At one time it was the largest sheriff's department in the state of Wisconsin, with about 750 deputy sheriffs. By 2015 the agency had reduced the number of sworn personnel to approximately 300. The reduction of sworn members was due to the county shifting jailing responsibilities to specific correction officers rather than sworn deputies.

The current sheriff (who is elected by the public as a partisan office) is Denita R. Ball, who was sworn on October 24, 2022. Ball was elected as a Democrat and is the force's first female leader.

== Bureaus and divisions ==
=== Administrative Services Bureau ===
The Administrative Services Bureau contains the Open Records Division, Central Records Unit, Media Relations, Clerical Staff, Traffic Desk, Special Events, Training Academy, Community Relations Unit, and the Honor Guard.

=== Detention Services Bureau ===
The Detention Services Bureau handles inmate health, transportation, food services, inmate housing, property, jail records, visiting, classification, central booking records and warrants.

=== Police Services Bureau ===
The Police Services Bureau oversees the Airport Division, Courts Division, Patrol Division, Parks Unit, Civil Process Unit, Motor Units, Explosive Ordnance Disposal (EOD) Unit, Special Weapons and Tactics (SWAT), Bicycle Patrol and the Boat Patrol

=== Criminal Investigations Bureau ===
The Criminal investigations Bureau Oversees the General Investigations Unit, Apprehension Unit, Background Investigations, Undercover Unit, and the Law Enforcement Analyst Division.

== MCSO Ranks ==
1.Sheriff: (1)

2.Chief Deputy: also known as Undersheriff is the second in charge. An Undersheriff partners with the Sheriff to develop the short- and long-term goals of the county’s sheriff’s department. (1)

3.Inspector: oversight of a Bureau operations and budgeting. (3)

4.Captain: oversight of a Division operations and budgeting. (12)

5.Lieutenant: Shift Commander, plans, oversees, and coordinates the daily activities of a designated operational entity of the Sheriff's Office. (9)

6.Sergeant: present the first line of supervisors. They perform all the duties of a Deputy as well as supervise, coordinate, and guide Deputy and other department employees in their daily activities. (15)

7.Deputy Sheriff: works to protect a county’s property and citizens. They patrol highways and cities, investigating crimes and keeping records of different criminal instances. They also escort detainees from court proceedings and ensure the courtroom is peaceful and professional.

Deputy Sheriffs operate different communications devices, like radios and telephones to report and respond to emergency calls. They’ll also navigate the highway and county areas to ensure all drivers are following posted speed limits and adhering to other traffic laws. Many Deputy Sheriffs also serve court documents to individuals.

Title	Insignia
Sheriff	
Chief Deputy	
Inspector	
Captain	
Lieutenant	
Sergeant	
Detective	
Deputy Sheriff	

== Fallen officers ==
Since the establishment of the Milwaukee County Sheriff's Office, 12 officers have died in the line of duty. For 11 years, the Milwaukee County Law Enforcement Executives Association, in conjunction with the Milwaukee County Sheriff’s Office and the Milwaukee Police Department, has hosted the Greater Milwaukee Law Enforcement Memorial Ceremony annually in May. The event, which honors Milwaukee County law enforcement officers killed in the line of duty, is part of the National Law Enforcement Memorial Week.

Officer	Date of death	Details
Deputy Sheriff Sergio Aleman	July 31, 2012	Automobile accident
Deputy Sheriff Sung Hui Bang	August 17, 2000	Aircraft accident
Deputy Sheriff I Ralph Edward Zylka	August 17, 2000	Aircraft accident
Deputy Sheriff I David Michael Demos	January 25, 1997	Vehicular assault
Deputy Sheriff I John Valentine Trandel	May 1, 1981	Heart attack
Deputy Sheriff Wallace N. Schilling	October 8, 1975	Gunfire (Accidental)
Deputy Sheriff Lloyd Rhodes	November 17, 1951	Automobile accident
Deputy Sheriff Al Beckemeier	May 10, 1947	Motorcycle accident
Deputy Sheriff Howard F. Grundman	January 30, 1934	Motorcycle accident
Deputy Sheriff George Pazik	May 30, 1917	Motorcycle accident
Deputy Sheriff Frank X. Heup	November 1, 1915	Motorcycle accident
Deputy Sheriff William Wank	August 18, 1915	Gunfire

== Equipment ==
Weapons and other duty equipment

- Sig P320 9mm- standard issue pistol, replaced Glock Model 22 Gen 4 .40
- Smith & Wesson M&P15- The Smith & Wesson M&P15 is used for normal patrol deputies.
- Taser X7- Used by patrol deputies as well as corrections officers.

Vehicles:

- Chevrolet Tahoe- patrol SUV
- Dodge Charger- patrol car
- Ford Explorers- patrol SUV

== See also ==
- List of law enforcement agencies in Wisconsin
