= Charles S. Jones =

American politician (1824–1889)

Member of the Pennsylvania House of Representatives from the Potter–McKean district
- In office January 6, 1873 – January 4, 1875
- Preceded by: Lucius Rogers
- Succeeded by: Butler B. Strang (Potter–McKean–Tioga dist.)

Personal details
- Born: February 4, 1824 Broome County, New York, U.S.
- Died: October 27, 1889 (aged 65) Coudersport, Pennsylvania, U.S.
- Resting place: Eulalia Cemetery, Coudersport
- Party: Republican
- Spouse: Maria Johnson (m. 1848–1889)
- Children: Mary A. Jones^{(b. 1850; died 1875)}; Frank E. Jones^{(b. 1858; died 1881)}; Charles Storrs Jones Jr.^{(b. 1868; died 1877)}
- Relatives: Frank Lavosieur Jones (brother); Edwin Adams Jones (brother); John Howe Jones (brother); Aaron Putnam Storrs (cousin)
- Occupation: Merchant

Charles Storrs Jones Sr. (February 4, 1824 – October 27, 1889) was an American merchant and Republican politician from Potter County, Pennsylvania. He represented Potter and McKean counties in the Pennsylvania House of Representatives during the 1873 and 1874 terms.

== Biography ==
Charles S. Jones was born in Broome County, New York, in 1824. He was raised and educated there, and taught school there after his primary education was complete. In 1847, he traveled to Potter County, Pennsylvania, with his brothers Frank and Edwin Jones, and their cousin Aaron Putnam Storrs. Frank, Charles, and Aaron pooled their money and purchased land and a store in the borough of Coudersport, Pennsylvania, for $1,500 ($51,830 in 2025); using the store, they began a general merchant business.

In 1872, Jones was the Republican nominee for Pennsylvania House of Representatives in the district comprising his home county, Potter, and the neighboring county of McKean. His Democratic opponent in the 1872 general election was Franklin W. Knox, the husband of his wife's sister. He was re-elected in 1873, but did not run for a third term in 1874.

Charles Jones died at his home in Coudersport on October 27, 1889, after about a year of poor health.

== Personal life and family ==
Charles S. Jones was the second of at least seven children born to Levi Jones (1793–1856) and his first wife Fanny (née Storrs; 1797–1848). Levi Jones was a prominent citizen in Broome County, New York, and served several years as associate judge of the county.

Charles's brothers Frank Lavosieur Jones and Edwin Adams Jones were also prominent in the early history of Potter County. Their youngest brother, John Howe Jones, went to Wisconsin and became a prominent attorney and politician there.

The Jones brothers' maternal ancestors were descendants of Samuel Storrs, who emigrated from England to the Massachusetts Bay Colony in 1663.

Charles S. Jones married Maria Johnson (1826–1904) on November 9, 1848. They had three children together, but their youngest child, Charles Jr., died at age eight due to Meningitis.
