= Levi M. Vilas =

American attorney (1844–1889)

4th Judge of the District Court of Minnesota from the 2nd district
- In office February 15, 1889 – August 25, 1889
- Appointed by: William Rush Merriam
- Preceded by: Orlando Simons
- Succeeded by: William L. Kelly

District Attorney of Eau Claire County, Wisconsin
- In office 1879–1881
- Preceded by: Loren Edwards
- Succeeded by: S. W. McCaslin

5th Mayor of Eau Claire, Wisconsin
- In office 1876–1877
- Preceded by: George Buffington
- Succeeded by: William Francis Bailey

1st City Attorney of Eau Claire, Wisconsin
- In office 1872–1873
- Preceded by: Position established
- Succeeded by: W. R. Hoyt

Personal details
- Born: Levi Madison Vilas; February 17, 1844 Chelsea, Vermont, U.S.
- Died: August 25, 1889 (aged 45) Madison, Wisconsin, U.S.
- Resting place: Forest Hill Cemetery
- Party: Democratic
- Spouses: Ella C. Slingluff (m. 1869; died 1879); Lizzie Stuart Ludlam (m. 1885)
- Relations: William F. Vilas (brother)
- Children: 4
- Parents: Levi Baker Vilas; Esther Green Smilie
- Education: Wisconsin University (MA); Albany Law School (LLB)

Levi Madison Vilas (February 17, 1844 – August 25, 1889) was an American attorney who served as the first city attorney for Eau Claire, Wisconsin.

Born in Vermont, the third son of Levi Baker Vilas and brother of William F. Vilas, he and his family later moved to Wisconsin when he was seven years old. He graduated from what was then Wisconsin University and Albany Law School. After being admitted to the bar, he returned to Wisconsin to practice law with his brother before joining the United States Army Quartermaster Corps.

He later moved to Eau Claire, where he practiced law and became its first city attorney after it was incorporated in 1872. Later, he was elected mayor of the city in 1876 and later district attorney for Eau Claire County in 1877. Afterwards, he and his family moved to St. Paul, Minnesota, where he was appointed by the Governor of Minnesota to be judge of the 2nd District Court of Minnesota representing Ramsey County. He held that position until his death due to Bright's disease in 1889.

== Early life and education ==
Vilas was born on February 17, 1844 in Chelsea, Vermont, the third son of politician Levi Baker Vilas and Esther Green Smilie. His brother, William F. Vilas, would later become the United States Senator from Wisconsin. He lived in his hometown until 1851, when his parents moved to Madison, Wisconsin, when he was seven years old. His father did so because he wanted to educate his sons in the state university.

He was kept in the schools of Madison during his younger years, completing basic education at Wisconsin University at fifteen years old and graduating in 1863 with a Master of Arts. That same year, he was educated at the Albany Law School in New York and later graduated with a Bachelor of Laws in 1864. He was later admitted to the bar in the supreme courts of New York and Wisconsin in May that same year.

== Career ==
After being admitted to the state bar, Vilas went back to Madison to practice law with his brother William for about a year. In 1865, he went into the United States Army Quartermaster Corps to work as chief clerk. He served two years in that position, working in places such as the Wyoming Territory and Fort Sedgwick. At the end of his tenure in the position, he returned to Madison and practiced law with William again, before moving to Eau Claire in 1868 and settled there, maintaining a large practice within the newly established city.

When Eau Claire became incorporated as a city in 1872, Vilas was elected to be its first city attorney, of which he served for one year, before being succeeded by W. R. Hoyt in 1873. He was then elected as mayor of Eau Claire in 1876, stating that both parties gave him hearty support. During the middle half of the 1870s, he practiced law under a partnership with Texas Angel. Vilas later became district attorney for Eau Claire County in 1877 and reelected into office in 1879. In 1885, the State Bar Association of Wisconsin, contemplating a change in the Wisconsin Supreme Court, passed resolutions wanting Vilas to be a candidate for the supreme bench. Vilas declined the nomination after seeing that the then-incumbent justice David Taylor wouldn't retire but sought reelection.

Afterwards, in 1887, Vilas and his family moved to St. Paul, Minnesota, where he would continue practicing law within the city. After two years of practicing law, two new district judgeships were created in Ramsey County. According to the Wisconsin State Journal, while he was away from home, without his knowledge, or a single effort on his part, one of the members of the Minnesota bar recommended Vilas to be appointed district attorney due to his proficiency in his previous post. Governor William Rush Merriam later ratified the appointment, despite him being a staunch Republican. He was appointed by the governor to serve as judge of the 2nd District Court of Minnesota representing Ramsey County on February 15, 1889.

He served the position until August 25, 1889, where he died at his mother's home in Madison due to Bright's disease he managed to catch during his time in Wisconsin. His mother and two of his brothers, Charles and Edward, were at his bedside when he died. He was buried in Forest Hill Cemetery in Madison.

== Personal life ==
Vilas was said to be a Democrat. He married in Eau Claire on August 25, 1869, to Ella C. Slingluff, a native of Pennsylvania. They had three children together. Singluff died on August 28, 1879. He later remarried in 1885 to Lizzie Stuart Ludlam of Chicago, where they had one child together.
