= William R. Gorsline =

American judge (1824–1879)

The Honorable William R. Gorsline

Justice of the Supreme Court of the Colorado Territory
- In office 1866–1870
- Appointed by: Andrew Johnson
- Preceded by: Charles F. Holly
- Succeeded by: James B. Belford

Wisconsin Circuit Court Judge for the 4th circuit
- In office June 1, 1855 – July 1858
- Preceded by: Timothy O. Howe
- Succeeded by: David Taylor

Personal details
- Born: January 28, 1824 Manlius, New York
- Died: March 30, 1879 (aged 55) Denver, Colorado
- Resting place: Wildwood Cemetery, Sheboygan, Wisconsin
- Party: Democratic

William Richard Gorsline (January 28, 1824 – March 30, 1879) was an associate justice of the Colorado Territorial Supreme Court from 1866 to 1870. He previously served as a circuit court judge in Wisconsin and a district judge in Colorado.

== Early life ==
Gorsline was born in Manlius, New York, on January 28, 1824. He was orphaned and an uncle raised him. He did well in school and began studying law in his hometown. In 1845, he moved to Milwaukee, Wisconsin Territory, and continued studying law with Frank Randall and was admitted to the bar later that year. He then opened up his own law office in Sheboygan, Wisconsin. In 1845 and 1846, he served as the register of deeds for Sheboygan County.

From 1850 to 1851, he served as a county judge in Sheboygan County. Then from about 1851 to July 1858, he served as the third judge of the fourth judicial circuit of the state of Wisconsin. At that time, he resigned and moved to Colorado.

== Career in Colorado ==
In Colorado, Gorsline settled in Gilpin County and established a law practice. In 1860, President James Buchanan appointed him district judge, a position to which President Andrew Johnson later reappointed him. On June 18, 1866, President Johnson appointed him to serve as an associate justice of the Supreme Court of the Territory of Colorado. He served on the court until 1870.

== Death ==
Gorsline died in Denver on March 2, 1879. He is buried in Wildwood Cemetery in Sheboygan.

Legal offices
Preceded by Timothy O. Howe	Wisconsin Circuit Court Judge for the 4th circuit June 1, 1855 – July 1858	Succeeded by David Taylor
Preceded by Charles F. Holly	Justice of the Supreme Court of the Colorado Territory; 1866–1870	Succeeded by James B. Belford
