= Lake View Cemetery (disambiguation) =

Lake View Cemetery is a garden cemetery in Cleveland, Ohio.

Lake View Cemetery or Lakeview Cemetery may also refer to:

in Canada

- Lakeview Cemetery, Sarnia, Ontario, Canada

in the United States

- Lake View Cemetery (Brockport, New York), listed on U.S. National Register of Historic Places (NRHP)
- Lake View Cemetery (Ithaca, New York), burial place of Carl Sagan
- Lake View Cemetery (Jamestown, New York)
- Lake View Cemetery (Penn Yan, New York), NRHP-listed
- Lakeview Cemetery (Richfield Springs, New York), burial place of Augustus R. Elwood
- Lakeview Cemetery (Skaneateles, New York), NRHP-listed in Onondaga County
- Lakeview Cemetery (Galveston, Texas)
- Lake View Cemetery (Seattle), Washington
- Lake View Cemetery (Eau Claire, Wisconsin) in Eau Claire, Wisconsin, burial place of George B. Shaw
