= George Buffington =

American businessman and politician, Mayor of Eau Claire, Wisconsin

George A. Buffington
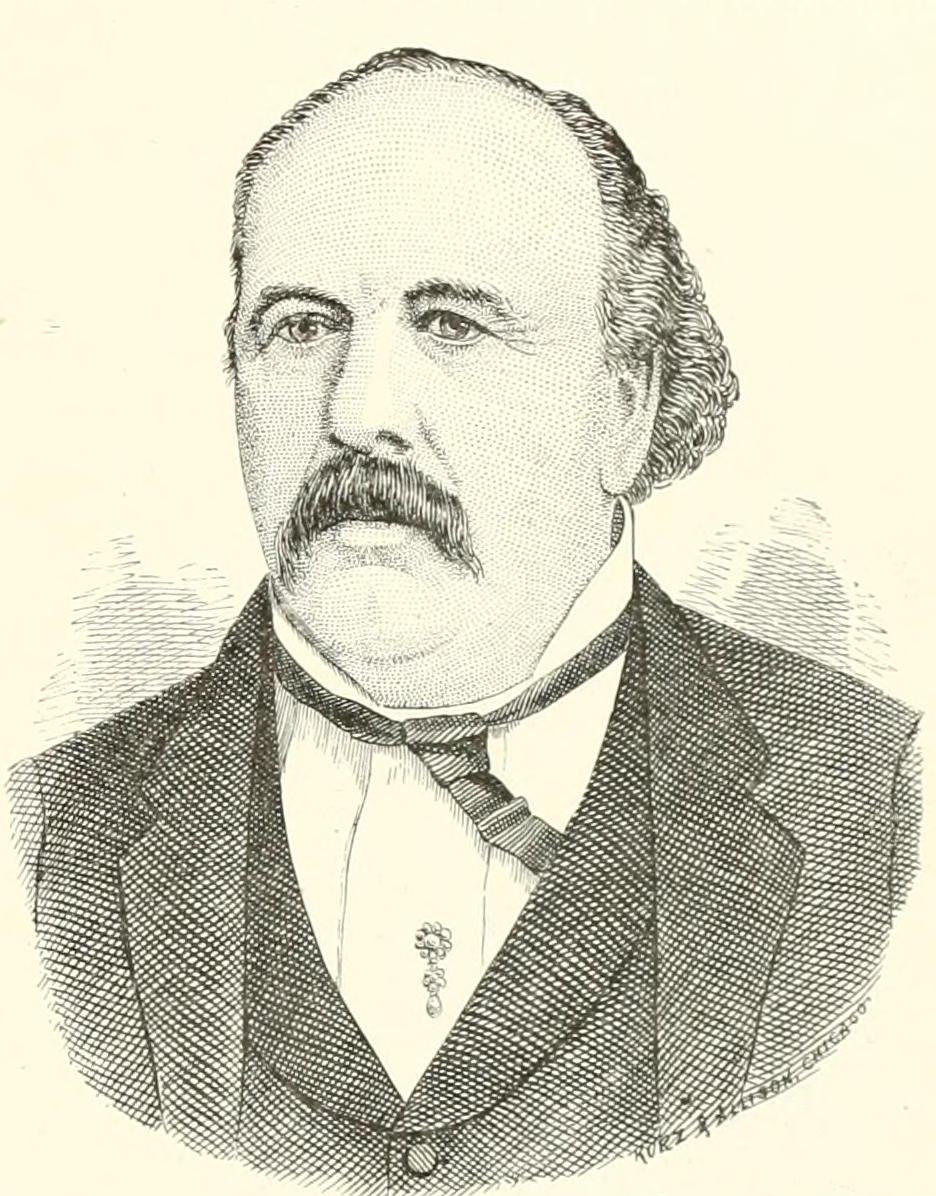

4th Mayor of Eau Claire
- In office 1875–1875
- Preceded by: G. E. Porter
- Succeeded by: L. M. Vilas

Personal details
- Born: George Augustus Buffington; June 29, 1825 Little Valley, Cattaraugus County, New York
- Died: September 16, 1893 (aged 68) DeLand, Florida
- Resting place: Lakeview Cemetery; Eau Claire, Wisconsin
- Party: Republican
- Spouses: Pluma A. Jones; (m. 1846; died 1887)
- Children: Clarence M. Buffington^{(b. 1847; died 1917)}; Charlie Buffington^{(b. 1850; died 1867)}; Ida C. (Chamberlin)^{(b. 1850; died 1930)}; Byron A. Buffington^{(b. 1852; died 1929)}
- Parents: Isaiah Buffington (father); Sophia (Winchester) Buffington (mother)
- Profession: Entrepreneur, proprietor, land agent

George Augustus Buffington (June 29, 1825 – September 16, 1893) was an American businessman, politician, and pioneer of the Chippewa Valley area of Wisconsin. He was the 4th mayor of Eau Claire, Wisconsin, and was one of the wealthiest citizens in Eau Claire's early history.

== Life and career ==
Buffington was born in Little Valley, Cattaraugus County, New York in 1825, the son of Isaiah and Sophia (Winchester) Buffington.

He was raised in Onondaga County, New York, until he was seventeen years old. He then came with his parents to Walworth County, Wisconsin, where he worked at farming, teaming, or anything by which he could make a living. In 1846, he married Pluma A. Jones. In the same year, he bought a piece of land nearby and had a log cabin built. Subsequently, he purchased a stage line running from Kenosha to Beloit. Two years later, he sold the stage line to Frink, Walker & Company. He and his wife moved to Stephenson County, Illinois, where he purchased 160 acres of land and began farming.

In 1850, Buffington sold his land and holdings in Illinois and moved to Dodge County, Wisconsin, where he was appointed Undersheriff and also elected Justice of the peace. At the same time he made investments in the grocery and sale stable businesses. Through these different endeavors Buffington managed to save $12,000. At the age of thirty, Buffington came to Eau Claire, Wisconsin where he purchased real estate. In 1857, he relocated his family to the area. He made a brief purchase of the Niagara House, and subsequently began steam boating. From 1858 to 1859, Buffington built the "Chippewa Valley" steamboat, which he ran until 1861. The boat was captured on the White River and burned after the Civil War broke out.

In 1859, Buffington purchased a fifty percent stake in the Ball & Smith sawmills, which were afterward known as the Smith & Buffington Mill Company. In 1874, the company was incorporated as the Valley Lumber Company with Buffington serving as president.

Buffington served as the chairman of the township board for a number of years, and was also elected to serve as the fourth Mayor of Eau Claire in 1875, an office that has since been abolished. He was an alderman on the Eau Claire City Council for several decades, and was also the chairman of the Eau Claire County Board of Supervisors. He was an active member in Freemasonry and the Knights Templar.

== Death ==
Buffington died in 1893 at the age of 68.

== Legacy ==
Buffington Drive is a street on the upper west side of Eau Claire named for Mr. Buffington's contributions to the area. The Buffington Neighborhood Association is on the west side of the city as well.

Buffington is regarded as having the foresight to forecast the quickly drying out industry of logging and its dependent industries at the confluence of the Eau Claire and Chippewa Rivers as early as 1885. He is quoted as saying, "Gentlemen, you had better get something while you can, because we've seen the last sawmill built in Eau Claire." The area would never again be seen as the wellspring of economic activity that it had been. Buffington's quote is displayed on the walking trail of Phoenix Park in downtown Eau Claire.

Buffington is interred at Lakeview Cemetery in Eau Claire.

== Further reading and references ==
- Barland, Lois. The Rivers Flow On. Stevens Point: Warzalla Publishing, 1965.
- "Historical and Biographical Album of the Chippewa Valley, Wisconsin" (1891–1892) Pages 407–408

Political offices
Preceded by G. E. Porter	Mayor of Eau Claire, Wisconsin; 1875	Succeeded by L. M. Vilas
