= Sheboygan County Courthouse =

- U.S. National Register of Historic Places
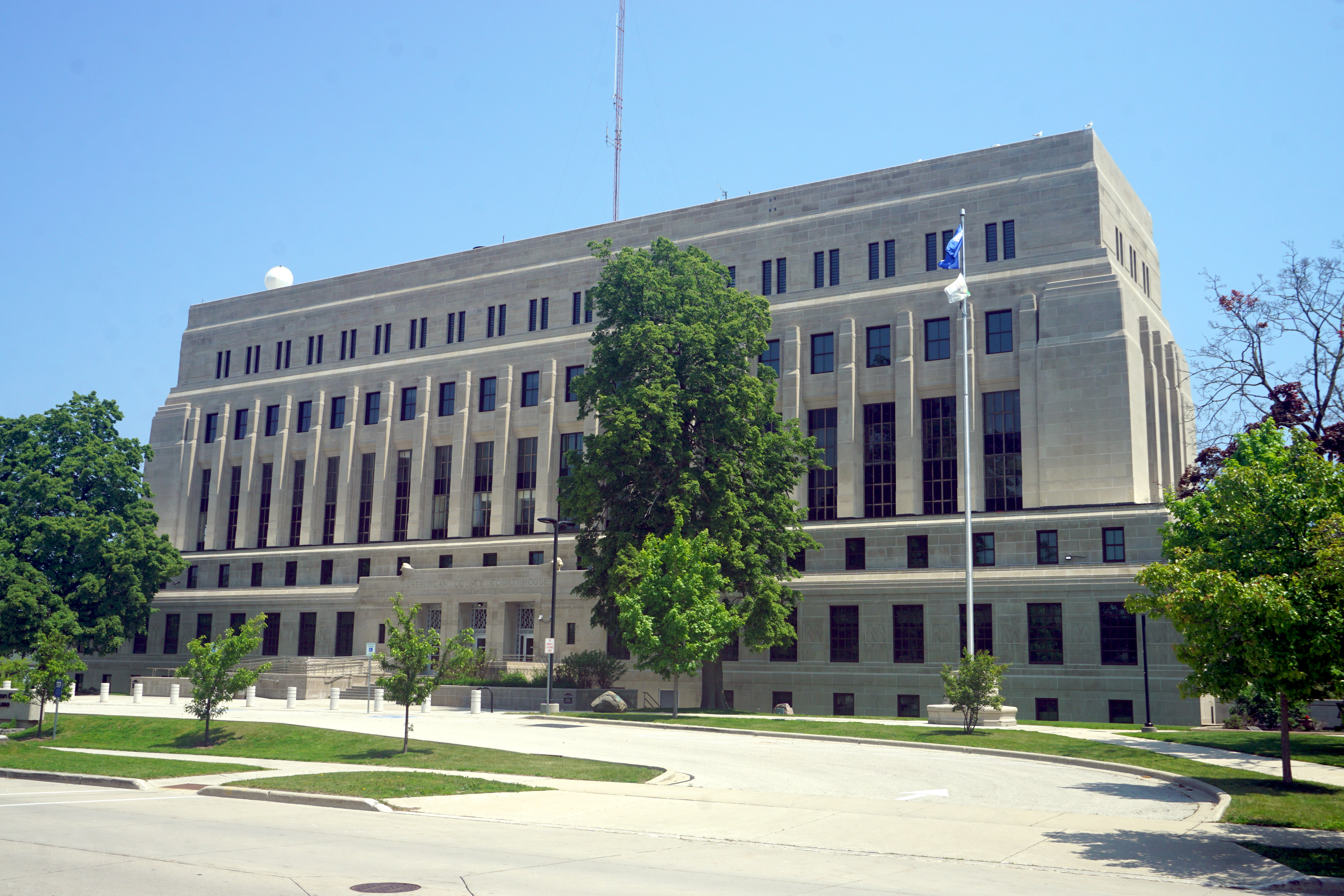
- Sheboygan County Courthouse in June 2025

- Location within Wisconsin Location within the United States
- Interactive map showing the location of Sheboygan County Courthouse
- Location: 615 North 6th Street; Sheboygan, Wisconsin
- Coordinates: 43°45′4″N 87°42′31″W
- Area: 2 acres (0.81 ha)
- Built: 1933
- Built by: Ralph Sollitt & Sons Co.
- Architect: W. C. Weeks and K. M. Vitzthum & Co.
- Architectural style: Moderne
- NRHP reference No.: 82000713
- Added to NRHP: March 9, 1982

The Sheboygan County Courthouse is a six-story courthouse for Sheboygan County, Wisconsin, located in central Sheboygan, Wisconsin.

== History ==
The cornerstone was laid in 1933 on the site of the previous 1868 building which was razed during the construction of the new courthouse (the former clock tower's face and clockworks would be later rebuilt into a new tower as part of the new Sheridan Elementary School in the late-1970s). It was completed in 1934 as a Works Progress Administration project, having provided 200 local workers with jobs in the midst of the Great Depression. The building received a four-story rear annex in 1956 and interior renovations in 1968. At that time, the building included county offices, a jail, and several court rooms, along with a board room on the fifth floor.

The jail (which took up the topmost sixth floor) eventually moved to a new building next door in the early-1980s with the Sheboygan County Sheriff's Department, before itself being split in a men's jail on the south side of Sheboygan in the mid 90s, with the women's jail and juvenile hall remaining in the 1980s facility. Several county offices moved to a new administration building in the late 90s across the street, northeast of the courthouse. The combined 911 dispatch facility for Sheboygan County and the city of Sheboygan is within the 1980s facility.

The city of Sheboygan has utilized the fifth-floor boardroom on multiple occasions as a temporary chamber for the Common Council, especially when City Hall has undergone renovations disallowing use of the regular chamber.

The courthouse was listed on the National Register of Historic Places in 1982, in part as a representative of the then modern design of a 20th-century government building, breaking with tradition-laden courthouses of the past. In the summer of 2018, the building received a renovation which reconstructed the front entrance to meet ADA and post-9/11 security guidelines, along with a front drive. The newly renovated front entrance is secured with metal and x-ray detectors, and now the only public means of entrance into the building.
