= St. Peter, Wisconsin =

Census-designated place in Wisconsin, United States

- Census-designated place
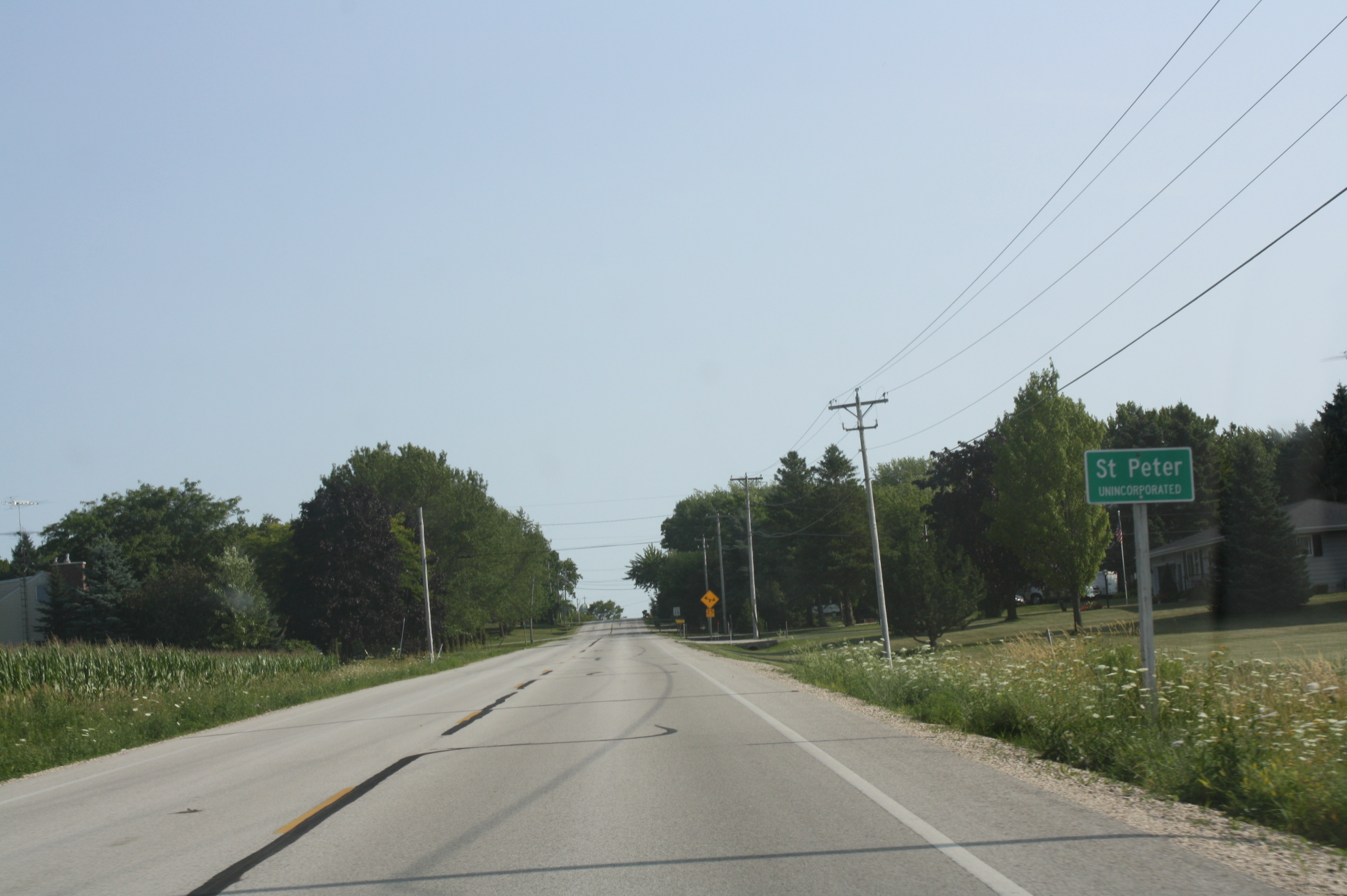
- Looking south at the sign for St. Peter
- Nickname: Gateway to the Holyland
- Location within Wisconsin
- Coordinates: 43°50′11″N 88°20′29″W
- Country: United States
- State: Wisconsin
- County: Fond du Lac

Area
  - Total: 3.633 sq mi (9.41 km^{2})
  - Land: 3.628 sq mi (9.40 km^{2})
  - Water: 0.005 sq mi (0.013 km^{2})
- Elevation: 1,063 ft (324 m)

Population (2020)
  - Total: 1,642
  - Density: 452.6/sq mi (174.7/km^{2})
- Time zone: UTC-6 (Central (CST))
  - Summer (DST): UTC-5 (CDT)
- ZIP codes: 53049, 54937
- Area code: 920
- GNIS feature ID: 1573503

St. Peter is an unincorporated census-designated place in the Town of Taycheedah in Fond du Lac County, Wisconsin, United States. It is located approximately 2 miles (3.2 km) northeast of Peebles and 1 mile (1.6 km) south of Silica. It was located on Wisconsin Highway 149 before the highway was decommissioned and turned over to county control as County Highway WH. As of the 2020 census, its population is 1,642, up from 1,489 at the 2010 census.

== Holyland ==
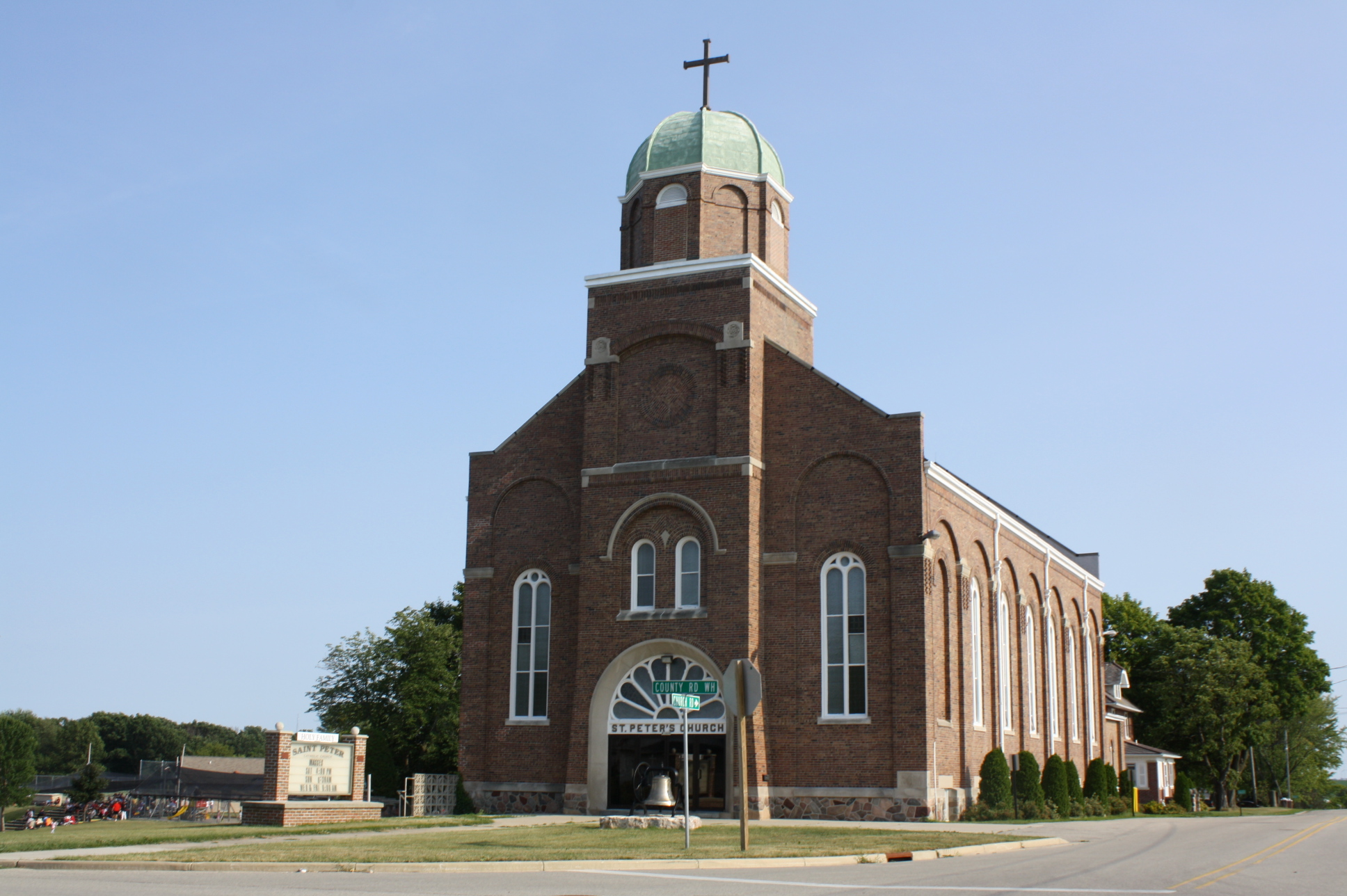
St. Peter Catholic church

St. Peter is in an area of eastern Fond du Lac County and adjacent Calumet County known as "The Holyland", so called because of the large number of villages settled by German immigrants and built around Catholic churches, including St. Anna, St. Cloud, Marytown, Mount Calvary, Johnsburg, Calvary, Brothertown and Jericho.
