= Marytown, Wisconsin =

- Unincorporated community
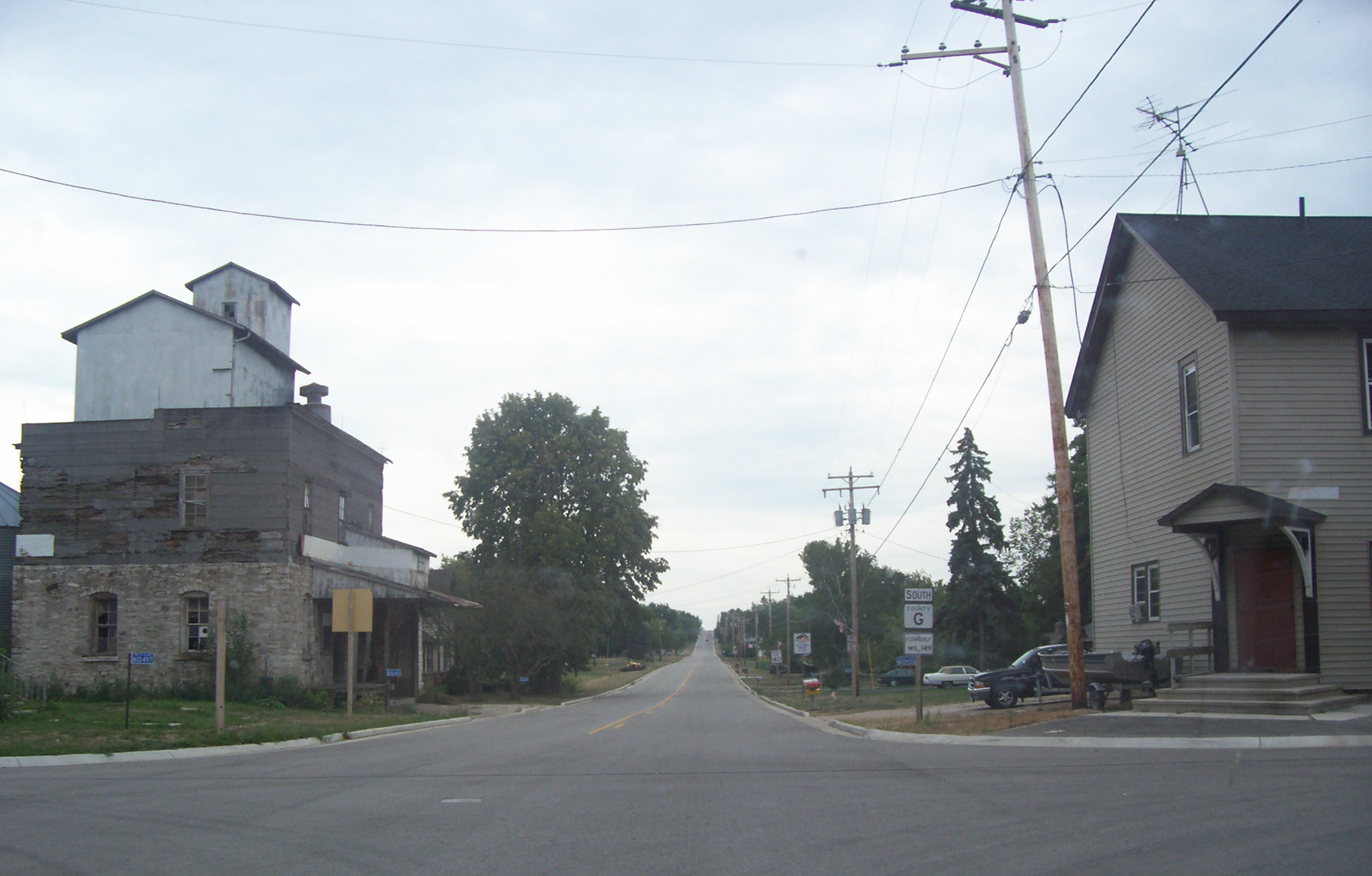
- Looking south at Marytown, Wisconsin

- Location within Wisconsin Location within the United States
- Coordinates: 43°54′49″N 88°12′08″W
- Country: United States
- State: Wisconsin
- County: Fond du Lac
- Elevation: 965 ft (294 m)
- Time zone: UTC-6 (Central (CST))
  - Summer (DST): UTC-5 (CDT)
- Zip codes: 53061
- Area code: 920
- GNIS feature ID: 1569109

Marytown is an unincorporated community in Fond du Lac County, Wisconsin, United States, in the town of Calumet. Marytown is located at the intersection of Fond du Lac County highways G and HH. Wisconsin Highway 149, ran north to south through the community before it was decommissioned in 2006.

== Holyland ==
Marytown is in an area of eastern Fond du Lac County, Wisconsin known as "The Holyland" because of the large number of communities built around churches, including St. Anna, St. Peter, St. Cloud, Mount Calvary, Johnsburg, Calvary, Brothertown and Jericho.

A recognizable feature in Marytown is St. Mary's Roman Catholic Church, which is located at the peak of the largest hill in the area. The church is lit at night and can be seen from several miles away.

== History ==
A post office was established in Marytown in 1854, but was later closed.

On July 18, 1996, several houses at the north end of Marytown were destroyed, and one person was killed by a tornado. This was part of a statewide outbreak of tornadoes on the same day as the Oakfield Tornado.

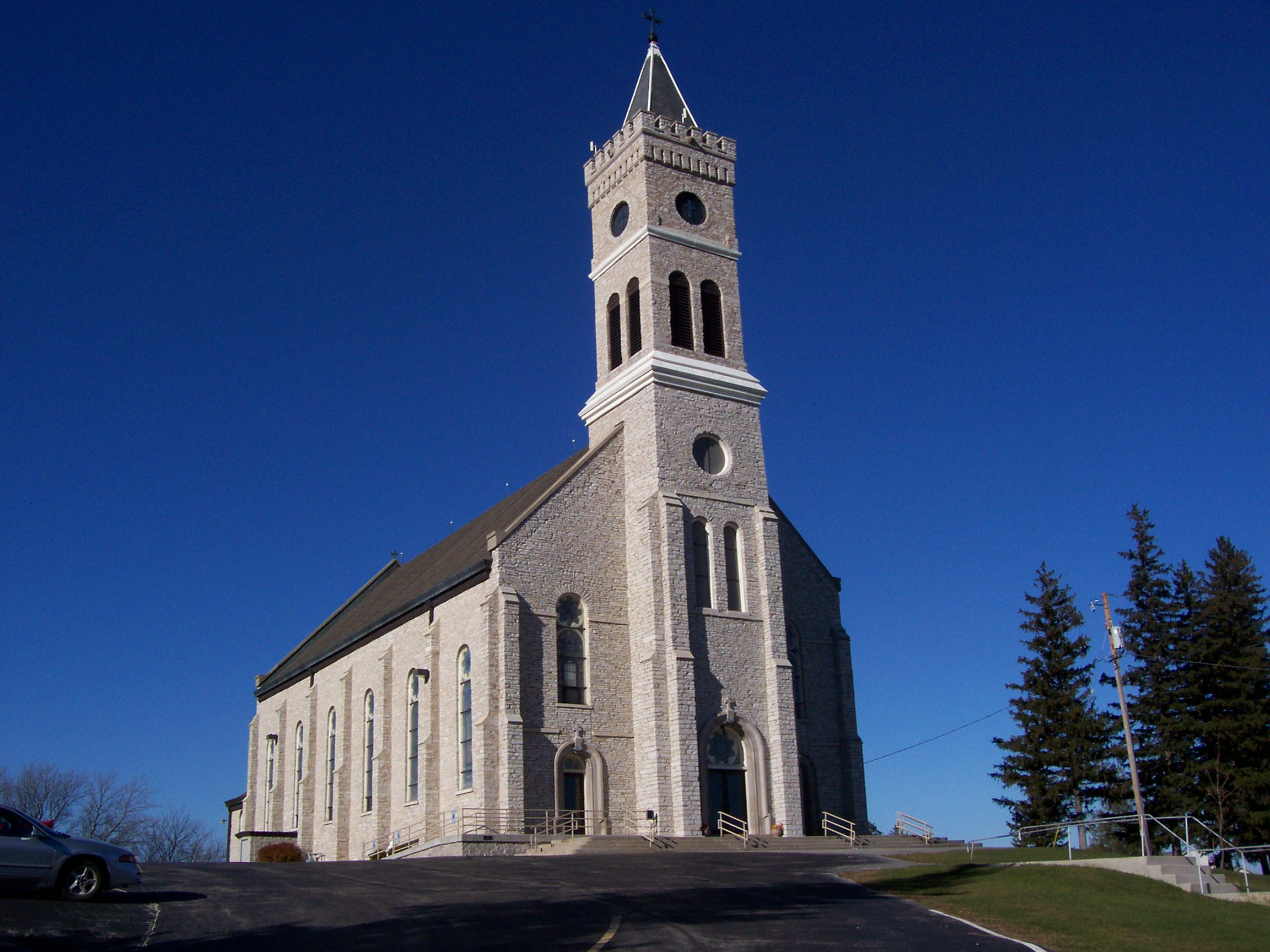
St. Mary's Church
