= Henry Rollmann =

American politician (1853–1927)

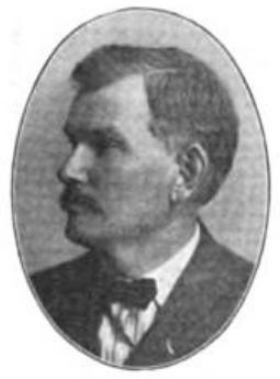

Member of the Wisconsin State Senate
- In office 1915–1918
- Constituency: 15th district

Member of the Wisconsin State Assembly
- In office 1906–1910
- Constituency: Calumet County

Personal details
- Born: February 9, 1853 Calvary, Wisconsin
- Died: August 23, 1927 (aged 74) Chilton, Wisconsin
- Party: Democrat
- Occupation: Druggist, politician

Henry Rollmann (February 9, 1853 – August 23, 1927) was a Wisconsin pharmacist and businessman who served as a member of the Wisconsin State Assembly and the Wisconsin State Senate.

== Biography ==
Rollmann was born on February 9, 1853, in Calvary, Wisconsin. He attended high school in Fond du Lac, Wisconsin. He died at his home in Chilton on August 23, 1927.

== Career ==
Rollmann was a member of the Senate representing the 15th district from 1915 to 1918. Previously, he had been elected to the Assembly in 1906 and 1908. Additionally, Rollmann was an alderman and Mayor of Chilton, Wisconsin. He was a Democrat.
