= Hopokoekau Beach, Wisconsin =

- Unincorporated community
- Location within Wisconsin Location within the United States
- Coordinates: 43°49′20″N 88°23′16″W
- Country: United States
- State: Wisconsin
- County: Fond du Lac
- Elevation: 751 ft (229 m)
- Time zone: UTC-6 (Central (CST))
  - Summer (DST): UTC-5 (CDT)
- Area code: 920
- GNIS feature ID: 1566691

Hopokoekau Beach is an unincorporated community in the town of Taycheedah, Fond du Lac County, Wisconsin, United States. The community was named after Hopokoekau, the wife of Sabrevoir de Carrie, a mid-eighteenth century French Canadian army officer.

== Images ==
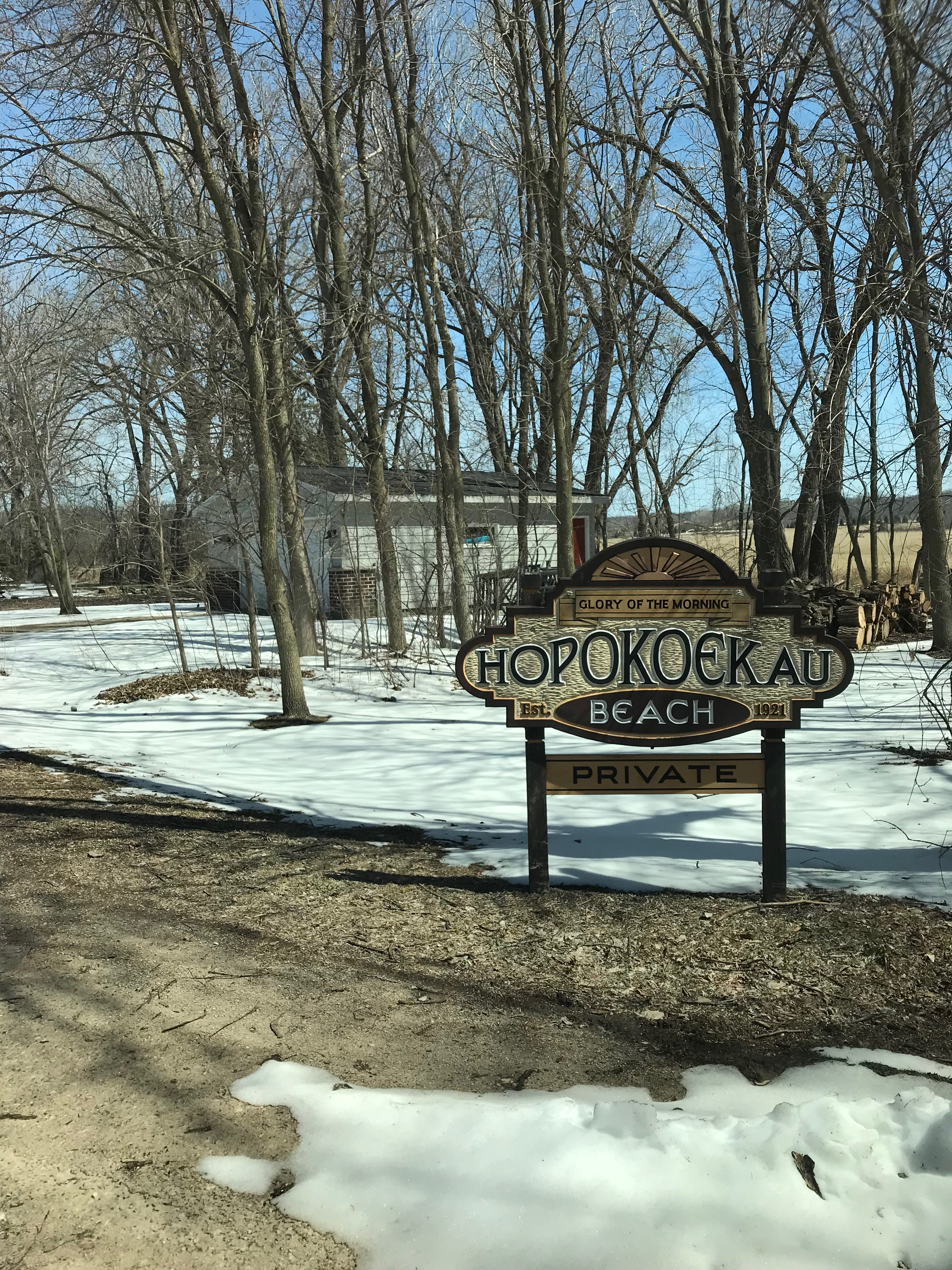
The sign outside of Hopokoekau Beach, Wisconsin
