= Evan Vogds =

American football player (1923–1994)

No. 79
- Position: Guard

Personal information
- Born: February 10, 1923; Johnsburg, Wisconsin, U.S.
- Died: August 6, 1994 (aged 71)

Career information
- College: Wisconsin

Career history
- Chicago Rockets (1946–1947); Green Bay Packers (1948–1949)

Career statistics
- Games played: 51
- Games started: 33
- Fumble recoveries: 1
- Stats at Pro Football Reference

Evan Edward "Red" Vogds (February 10, 1923 – August 6, 1994) was an American professional football player who was a guard in the All-America Football Conference (AAFC) and the National Football League (NFL).

Born in Johnsburg, Wisconsin, Vogds played college football for the Wisconsin Badgers. He played for the AAFC's Chicago Rockets (1946–1947) and the NFL's Green Bay Packers (1948–1949).
