= Peebles, Wisconsin =

- Unincorporated community
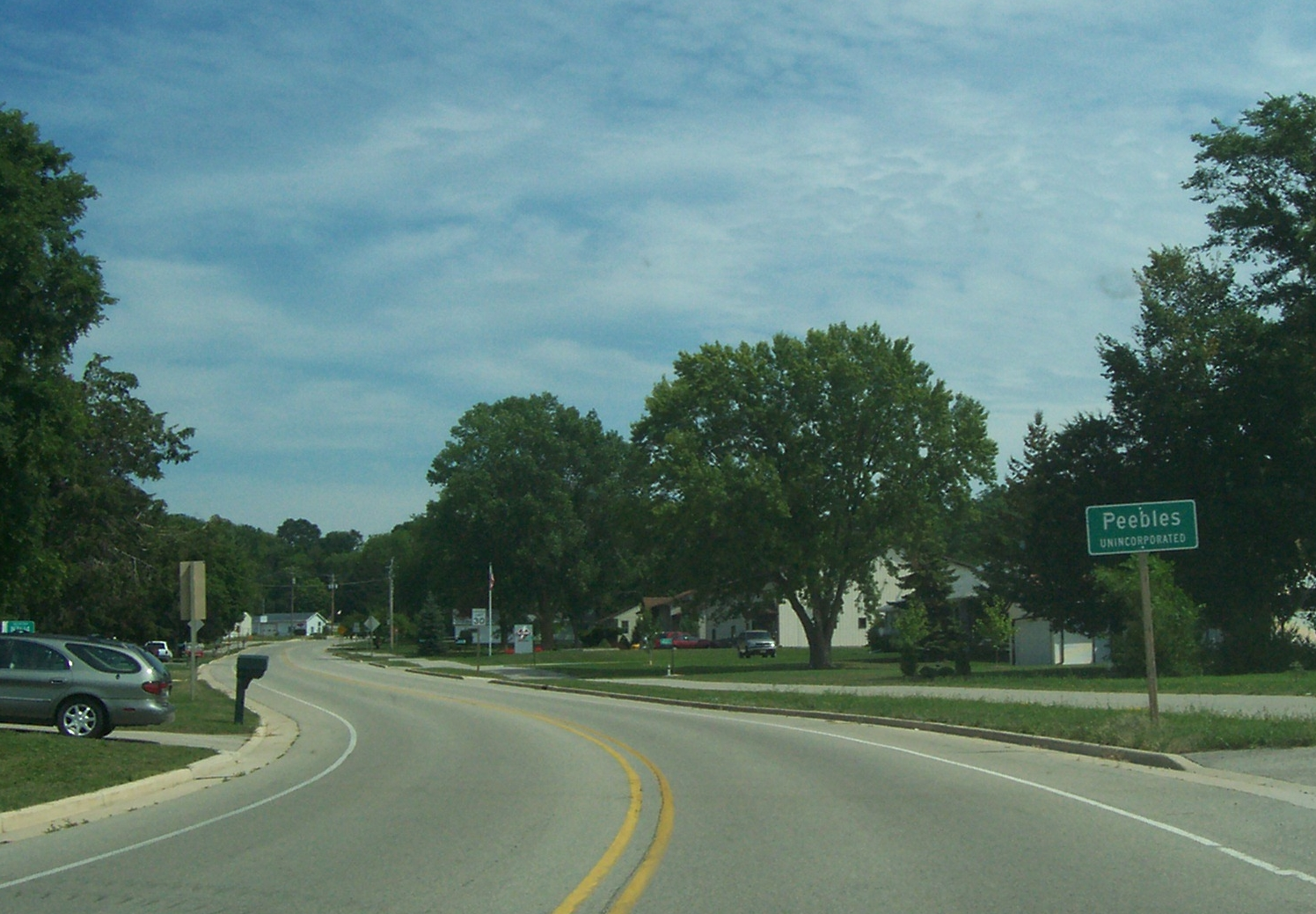
- Looking east towards Peebles, Wisconsin

- Location within Wisconsin Location within the United States
- Coordinates: 43°48′59″N 88°22′35″W
- Country: United States
- State: Wisconsin
- County: Fond du Lac
- Elevation: 814 ft (248 m)
- Time zone: UTC-6 (Central (CST))
  - Summer (DST): UTC-5 (CDT)
- Zip codes: 54935, 54936
- Area code: 920
- GNIS feature ID: 1571147

Peebles (pronounced Pēbles) is an unincorporated community in the Town of Taycheedah in Fond du Lac County, Wisconsin, United States. The community is located adjacent to the unincorporated community of Taycheedah. U.S. Route 151 runs through the community. Wisconsin Highway 149 once passed through the community to its western terminus until it was decommissioned in 2006. Taycheedah Correctional Institution is located in the town of Taycheedah, several miles south of the community.

== History ==
The community was named for Ezra Peebles, the original owner of the town site. In the past, the community was also known as Peebles Corners. In 1880, the area was home to a post office, tollgate, store, cheese-factory, and railroad depot for the Sheboygan and Fond du Lac Railroad.

== Images ==
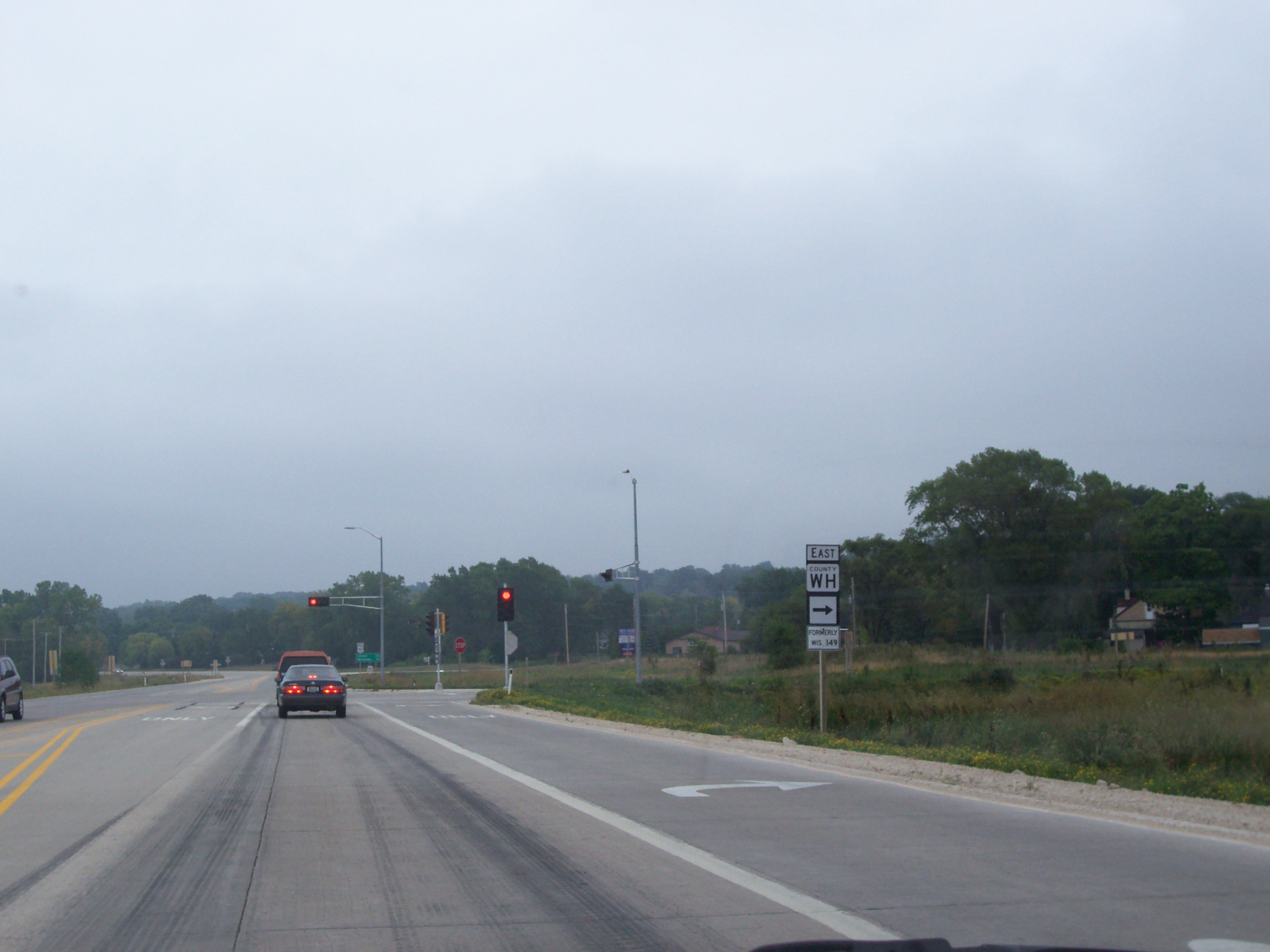
Former terminus of WIS 149 on the west edge of the community

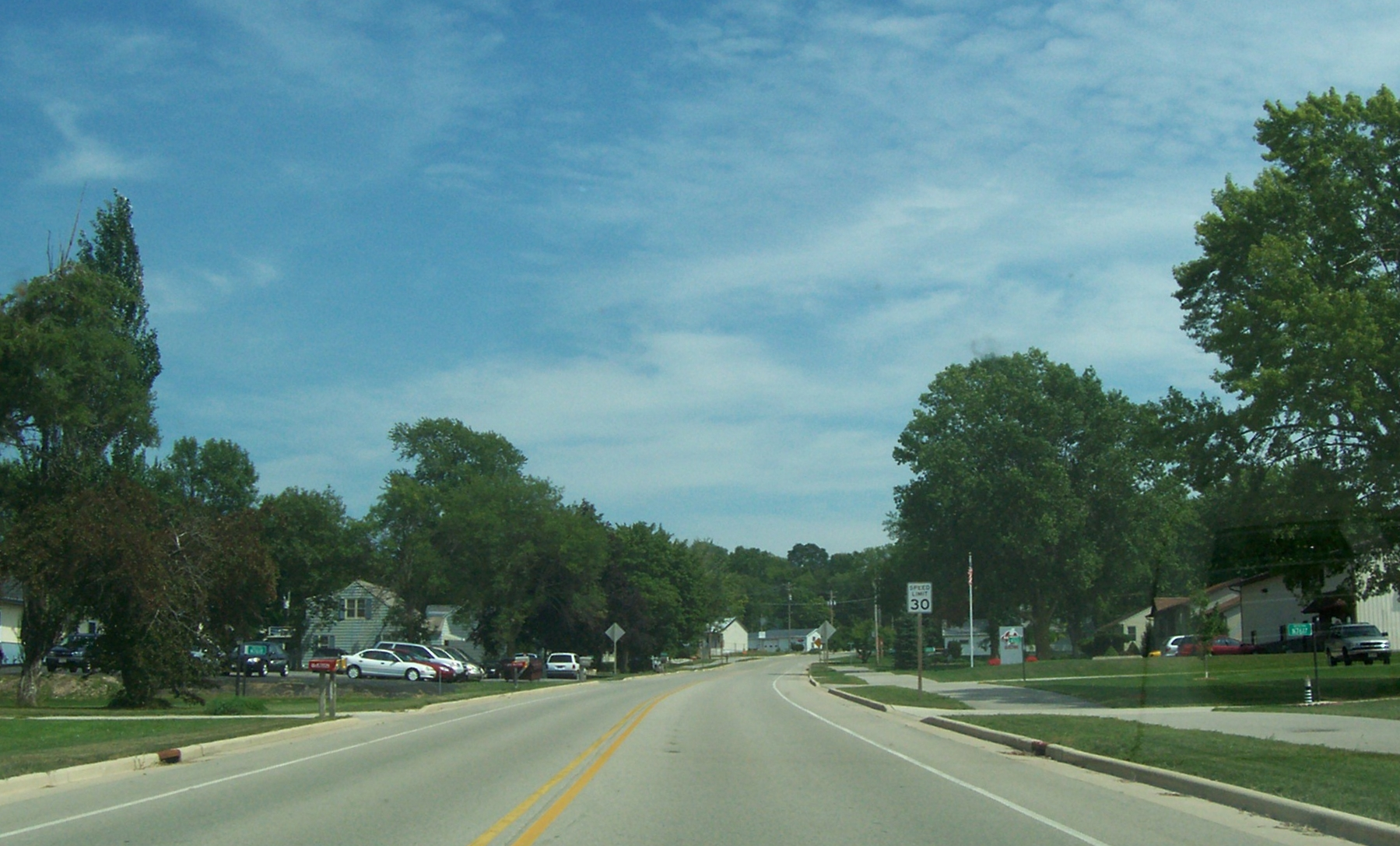
Looking east at downtown Peebles
