= Silica, Wisconsin =

- Unincorporated community
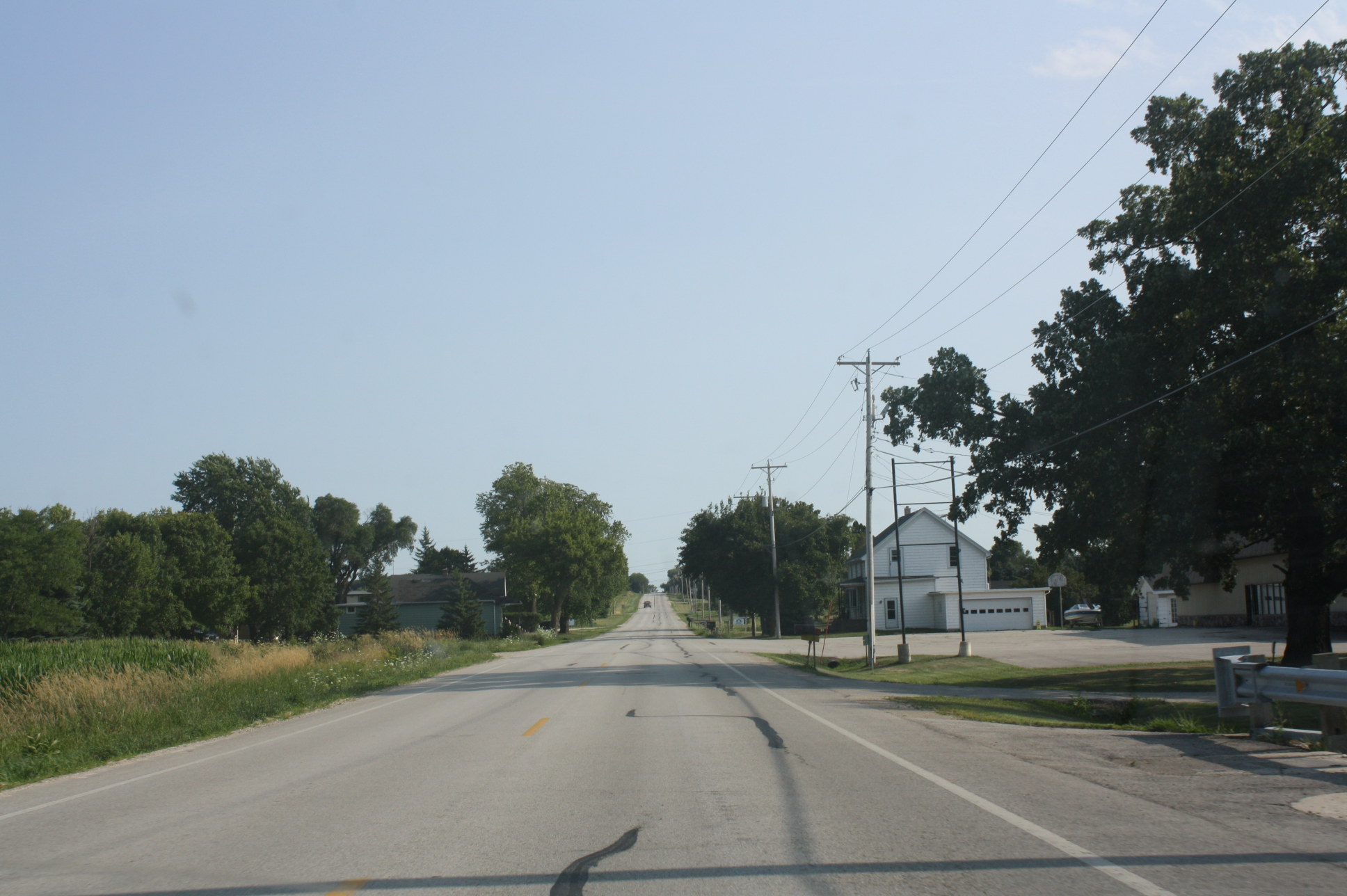
- Looking south toward Silica, Wisconsin

- Location within Wisconsin Location within the United States
- Coordinates: 43°51′01″N 88°20′30″W
- Country: United States
- State: Wisconsin
- County: Fond du Lac
- Elevation: 984 ft (300 m)
- Time zone: UTC-6 (Central (CST))
  - Summer (DST): UTC-5 (CDT)
- Postal code: 53049
- Area code: 920
- GNIS feature ID: 1574094

Silica, Wisconsin is an unincorporated community in the Town of Taycheedah in Fond du Lac County, Wisconsin, United States. It is located at the intersection of County Highway QQ and Silica Road, approximately 1 mile (1.6 km) north of St. Peter.

== History ==
A post office called Silica was in operation from 1898 until 1904. The community was so named on account of the sandy soil, Silica being the Latin word meaning "sand".

Prior to being named Silica it was named Summit.
