= Minawa Beach, Wisconsin =

- Unincorporated community
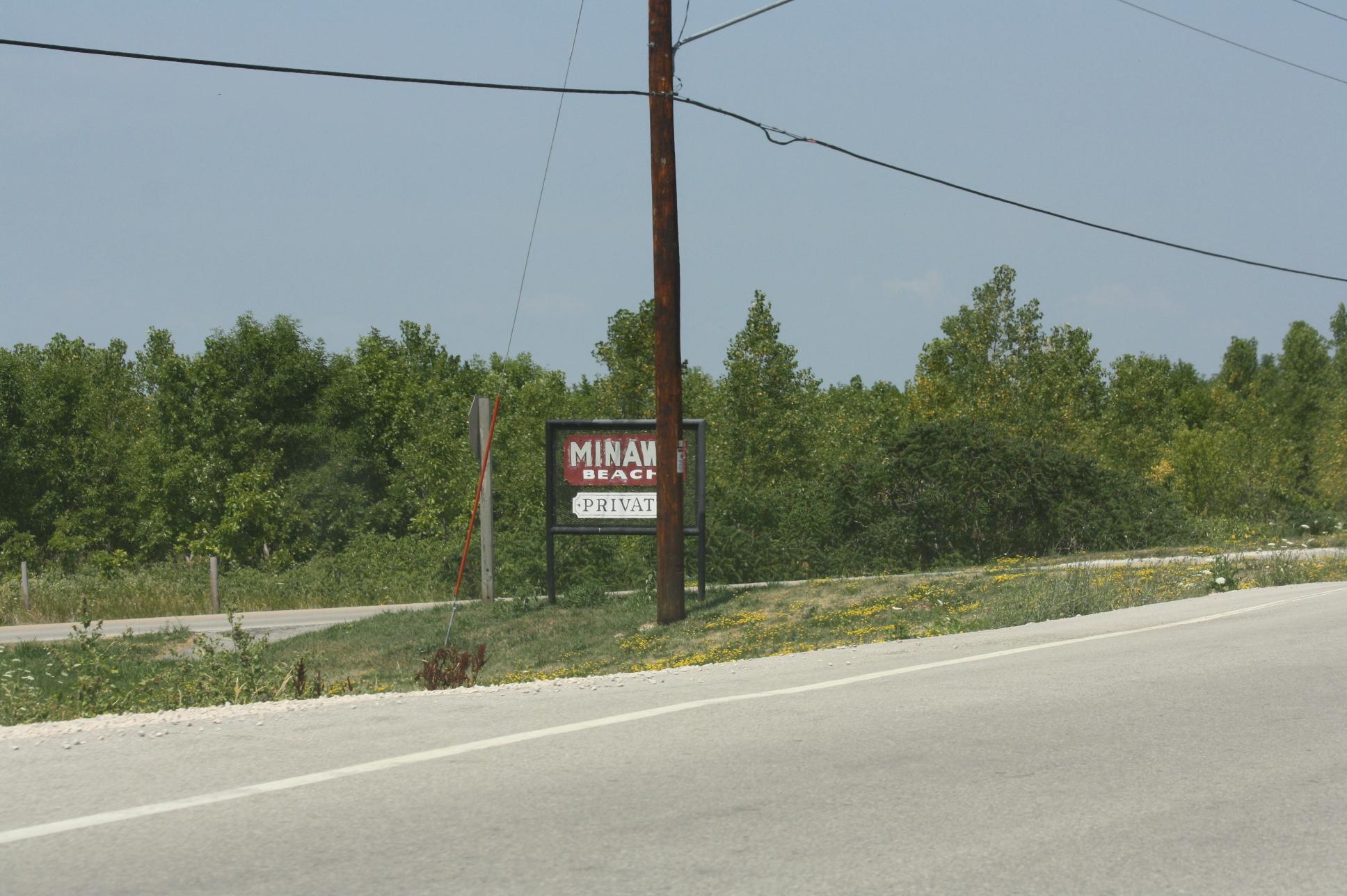
- Sign for Minawa Beach

- Location within Wisconsin Location within the United States
- Coordinates: 43°50′47″N 88°22′53″W
- Country: United States
- State: Wisconsin
- County: Fond du Lac
- Elevation: 751 ft (229 m)
- Time zone: UTC-6 (Central (CST))
  - Summer (DST): UTC-5 (CDT)
- Area code: 920
- GNIS feature ID: 1569545

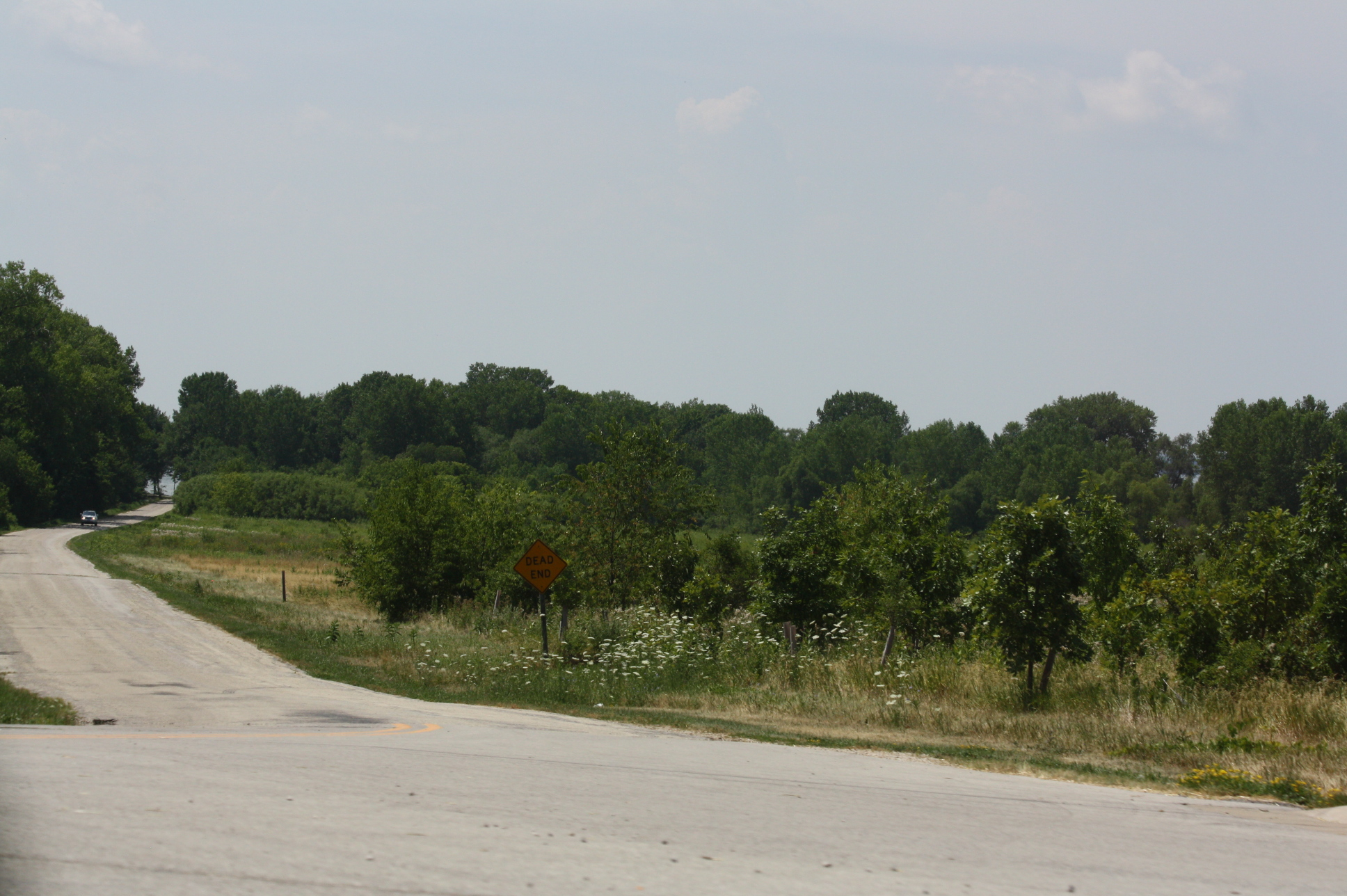
Road entering Minawa Beach

Minawa Beach is an unincorporated community in the town of Taycheedah, Fond du Lac County, United States.
