= Taycheedah, Wisconsin =

- Town
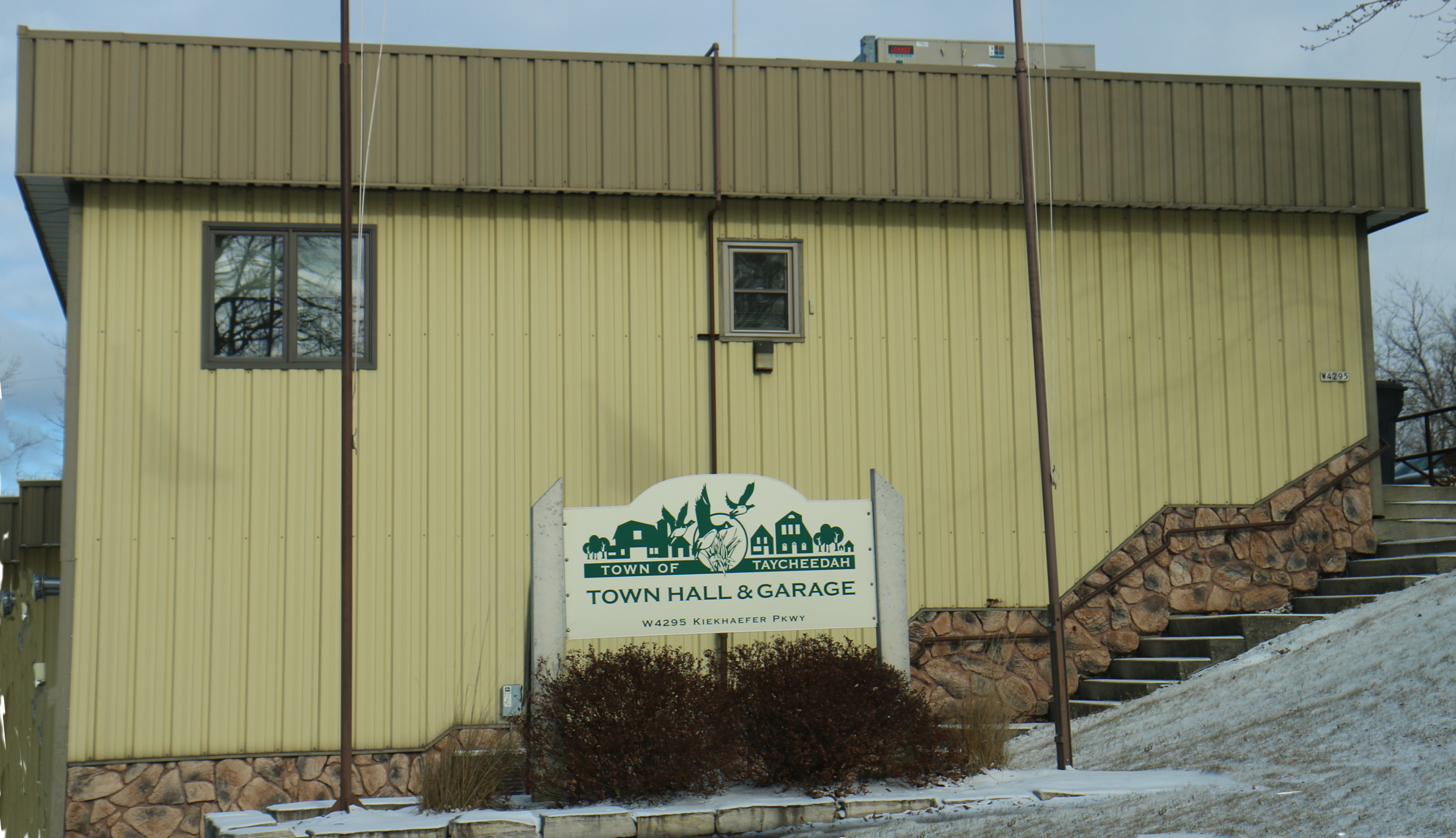
- Taycheedah town hall

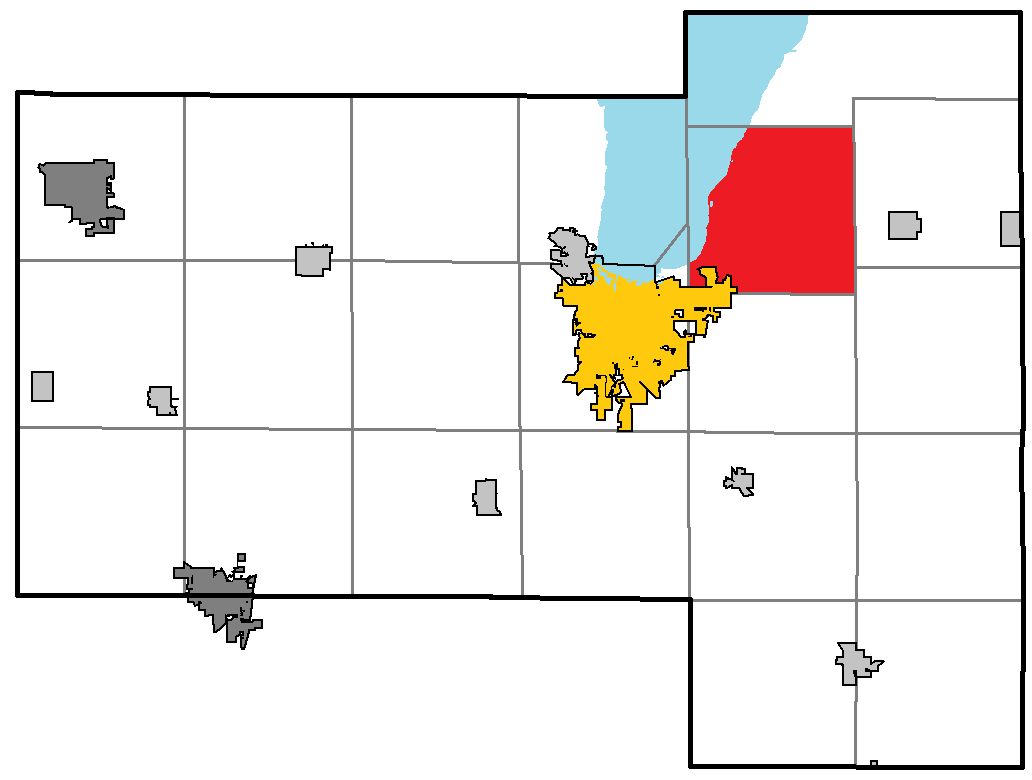
- Location of Taycheedah, within Fond du Lac County

- Location within Wisconsin Location within the United States
- Coordinates: 43°49′49″N 88°21′25″W
- Country: United States
- State: Wisconsin
- County: Fond du Lac

Area
  - Total: 35.3 sq mi (91.3 km^{2})
  - Land: 30.0 sq mi (77.7 km^{2})
  - Water: 5.3 sq mi (13.6 km^{2})
- Elevation: 1,073 ft (327 m)

Population (2020)
  - Total: 4,554
  - Density: 152/sq mi (58.6/km^{2})
- Time zone: UTC-6 (Central (CST))
  - Summer (DST): UTC-5 (CDT)
- Zip Codes: 53049, 54935, 54937
- Area code: 920
- FIPS code: 55-79125
- GNIS feature ID: 1584267
- Website: https://www.townoftaycheedahwi.gov/

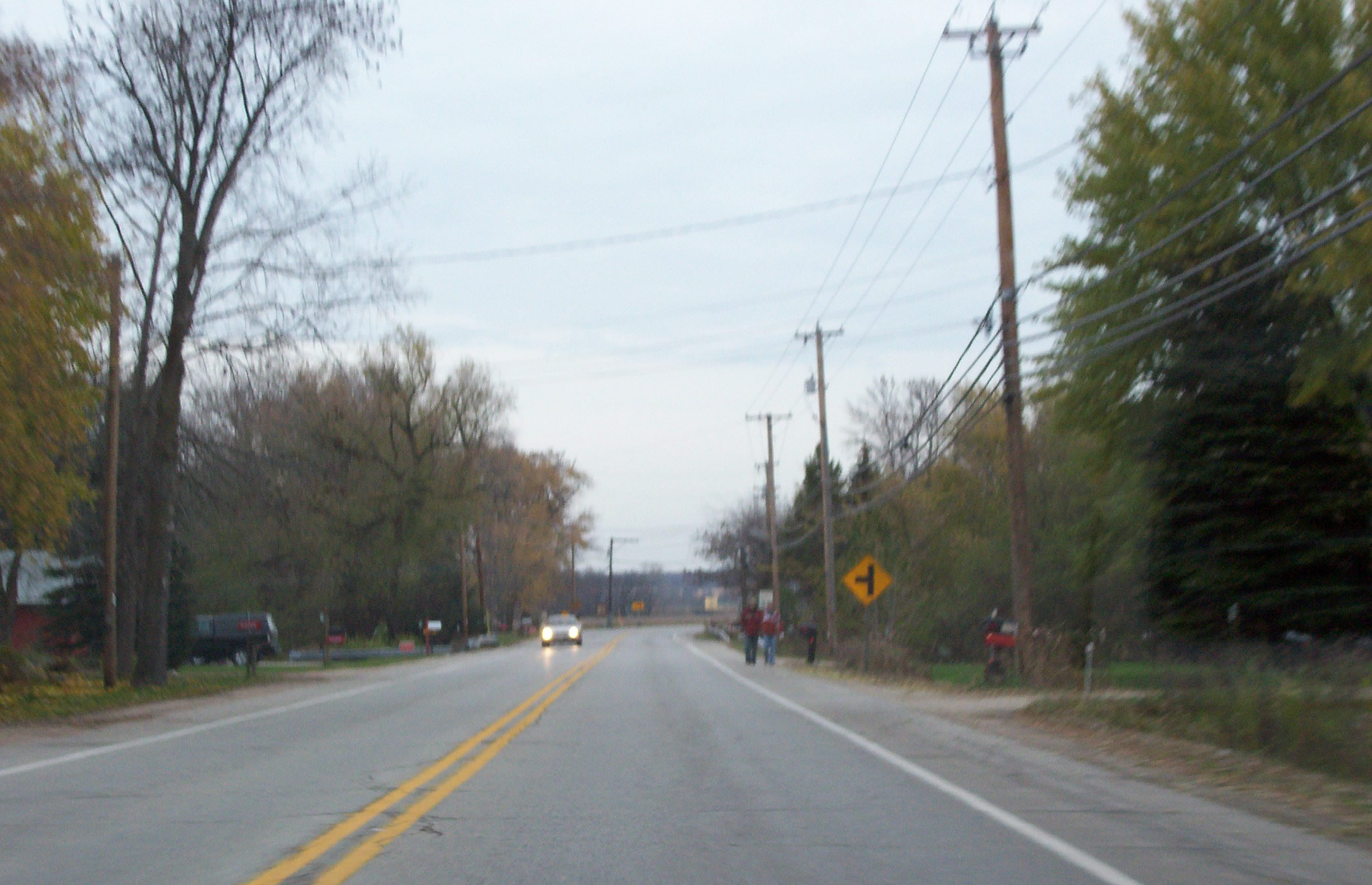
The unincorporated community of Taycheedah in the town

Taycheedah (originally Taychedah) is a town in Fond du Lac County, Wisconsin, United States. The population was 4,554 at the 2020 census. The census-designated places of St. Peter and Taycheedah and the unincorporated communities of Hopokoekau Beach, Linden Beach, Minawa Beach, Peebles, Silica, and Welling Beach are located in the town, as well as Malone, which is partially located in the town.

== Geography ==
According to the United States Census Bureau, the town has a total area of 35.2 square miles (91.3 km^{2}), of which 30.0 square miles (77.7 km^{2}) is land and 5.2 square miles (13.6 km^{2}) (14.90%) is water.

== Demographics ==
As of the census of 2000, there were 3,666 people, 1,319 households, and 1,105 families residing in the town. The population density was 122.2 people per square mile (47.2/km^{2}). There were 1,423 housing units at an average density of 47.4 per square mile (18.3/km^{2}). The racial makeup of the town was 99.18% White, 0.03% African American, 0.11% Native American, 0.16% Asian, 0.05% from other races, and 0.46% from two or more races. Hispanic or Latino of any race were 0.71% of the population.

There were 1,319 households, out of which 37.1% had children under the age of 18 living with them, 77.0% were married couples living together, 4.2% had a female householder with no husband present, and 16.2% were non-families. 13.6% of all households were made up of individuals, and 6.3% had someone living alone who was 65 years of age or older. The average household size was 2.78 and the average family size was 3.06.

In the town, the population was spread out, with 26.6% under the age of 18, 6.0% from 18 to 24, 26.8% from 25 to 44, 28.6% from 45 to 64, and 11.9% who were 65 years of age or older. The median age was 40 years. For every 100 females, there were 104.0 males. For every 100 females age 18 and over, there were 102.7 males.

The median income for a household in the town was $59,231, and the median income for a family was $65,050. Males had a median income of $41,237 versus $26,377 for females. The per capita income for the town was $23,423. About 2.5% of families and 2.6% of the population were below the poverty line, including 2.6% of those under age 18 and 3.1% of those age 65 or over.

== Notable people ==
- Alexander W. Stow, first Chief Justice of the Wisconsin Supreme Court

== Taycheedah Correctional Institution ==
On the southeastern end of Taycheedah sits the Taycheedah Correctional Institution. The Taycheedah Correctional Institution is a maximum and medium security women's prison. As of 2006, the Taycheedah Correctional Institution was the largest women's prison in Wisconsin, holding over 700 incarcerated women.
