= Fond du Lac County, Wisconsin =

County in Wisconsin, United States

- County
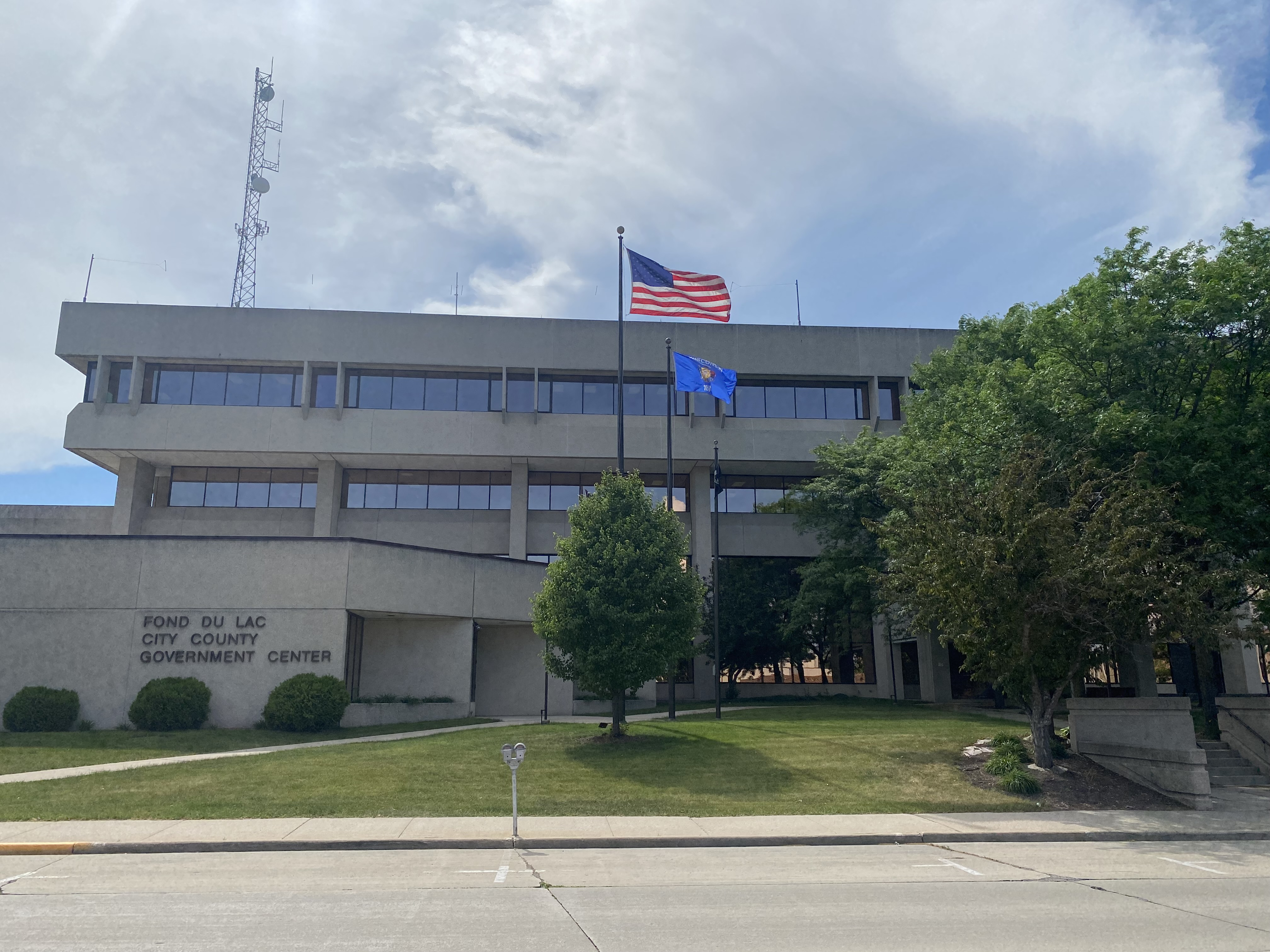
- Fond du Lac County City/County Government Center

- Seal

- Map of Wisconsin showing Fond du Lac County

- Wisconsin's location in the contiguous United States
- Coordinates: 43.76°N 88.49°W
- Incorporated: 1836
- County seat: Fond du Lac
- Largest city: Fond du Lac
- Municipalities: 33 (total): 3 cities; 21 towns; 9 villages

Government
  - Type: County
  - Body: Board of Supervisors
  - Executive: Sam Kaufman
  - County Board: 25 supervisors

Area
  - Total: 1,980 km^{2} (766 sq mi)
  - Land: 1,900 km^{2} (720 sq mi)
  - Water: 120 km^{2} (46 sq mi)
  - Rank: 40th largest county in Wisconsin

Population (2020)
  - Total: 104,154
  - Estimate (2025): 104,669 ▲
  - Rank: 16th largest county in Wisconsin
  - Density: 55.9/km^{2} (144.7/sq mi)
- Time zone: UTC−6 (Central)
  - Summer (DST): UTC−5 (Central)
- ZIP Code: 54971, 53931, 53919, 53946, 53963, 54964, 54932, 54974, 53065, 53006, 54979, 54937, 54935, 53048, 53010, 53040, 53011, 53019, 53057, 53079, 53049, 53061, 53014
- Area codes: 920
- Congressional districts: 6th
- Airports: Fond du Lac County Airport
- Waterways: Fond du Lac River; Milwaukee River; Rock River; Sheboygan River; Lake Winnebago
- Website: https://www.fdlco.wi.gov/

Fond du Lac County (/ˈfɒndəlæk/) is a county in the U.S. state of Wisconsin. As of the 2020 census, the population was 104,154. Its county seat is Fond du Lac. The county was created in the Wisconsin Territory in 1836 and later organized in 1844. Fond du Lac is French for "bottom of the lake", given so because of the county's location at the southern shore of Lake Winnebago. Fond du Lac County comprises the Fond du Lac, Wisconsin Metropolitan Statistical Area. The Holyland region is in northeastern Fond du Lac County.

== Geography ==
According to the U.S. Census Bureau, the county has a total area of 766 square miles (1,980 km^{2}), of which 720 square miles (1,900 km^{2}) is land and 46 square miles (120 km^{2}) (6.0%) is water.

=== Adjacent counties ===
- Winnebago County – north
- Calumet County – northeast
- Sheboygan County – east
- Washington County – southeast
- Dodge County – southwest
- Green Lake County – west

=== National protected area ===
- Horicon National Wildlife Refuge (part)

== Transportation ==
=== Major highways ===
- Interstate 41
- U.S. Highway 41
- U.S. Highway 45
- U.S. Highway 151
- Highway 23 (Wisconsin)
- Highway 26 (Wisconsin)
- Highway 44 (Wisconsin)
- Highway 49 (Wisconsin)
- Highway 67 (Wisconsin)
- Highway 175 (Wisconsin)

=== Railroads ===
- Canadian National
- Wisconsin and Southern Railroad

=== Buses ===
- Fond du Lac Area Transit

=== Airport ===
Fond du Lac County Airport (IATA: FLD, ICAO: KFLD, FAA LID: FLD) serves the county and surrounding communities.

== Climate ==
Fond du Lac County

Climate chart (precipitation, max. and min. temperature)
J	F	M	A	M	J	J	A	S	O	N	D
73 −8 −12	68 −7 −13	85 4 −6	151 17 2	126 23 6	142 25 14	94 28 16	90 24 14	80 22 11	125 15 7	65 5 −2	70 −3 −10
- █ Average max. and min. temperatures in °C
- █ Precipitation totals in mm
Imperial conversion
J	F	M	A	M	J	J	A	S	O	N	D
2.9 18 10	2.7 19 9	3.3 39 21	5.9 63 36	5 73 43	5.6 77 57	3.7 82 61	3.5 75 57	3.1 72 52	4.9 59 45	2.6 41 28	2.8 27 14
- █ Average max. and min. temperatures in °F
- █ Precipitation totals in inches

== Demographics ==
Historical population
Census	Pop.	Note	%±
1840	139		—
1850	14,510		10,338.8%
1860	34,154		135.4%
1870	46,273		35.5%
1880	46,859		1.3%
1890	44,088		−5.9%
1900	47,589		7.9%
1910	51,610		8.4%
1920	56,119		8.7%
1930	59,883		6.7%
1940	62,353		4.1%
1950	67,829		8.8%
1960	75,085		10.7%
1970	84,567		12.6%
1980	88,964		5.2%
1990	90,083		1.3%
2000	97,296		8.0%
2010	101,633		4.5%
2020	104,154		2.5%
2025 (est.)	104,669	▲	0.5%
U.S. Decennial Census; 1790–1960 1900–1990; 1990–2000 2010–2020

=== Racial and ethnic composition ===
Fond du Lac County, Wisconsin – Racial and ethnic composition Note: the US Census treats Hispanic/Latino as an ethnic category. This table excludes Latinos from the racial categories and assigns them to a separate category. Hispanics/Latinos may be of any race.
Race / Ethnicity (NH = Non-Hispanic)	Pop 1980	Pop 1990	Pop 2000	Pop 2010	Pop 2020	% 1980	% 1990	% 2000	% 2010	% 2020
White alone (NH)	87,697	88,157	92,528	93,398	90,150	98.58%	97.86%	95.10%	91.90%	86.55%
Black or African American alone (NH)	124	251	857	1,226	2,321	0.14%	0.28%	0.88%	1.21%	2.23%
Native American or Alaska Native alone (NH)	184	283	353	422	355	0.21%	0.31%	0.36%	0.42%	0.34%
Asian alone (NH)	138	435	839	1,129	1,241	0.16%	0.48%	0.86%	1.11%	1.19%
Native Hawaiian or Pacific Islander alone (NH)	x	x	25	16	31	x	x	0.03%	0.02%	0.03%
Other race alone (NH)	69	20	31	45	214	0.08%	0.02%	0.03%	0.04%	0.21%
Mixed race or Multiracial (NH)	x	x	676	1,029	3,125	x	x	0.69%	1.01%	3.00%
Hispanic or Latino (any race)	752	937	1,987	4,368	6,717	0.85%	1.04%	2.04%	4.30%	6.45%
Total	88,964	90,083	97,296	101,633	104,154	100.00%	100.00%	100.00%	100.00%	100.00%

=== 2020 census ===
As of the 2020 census, the county had a population of 104,154. The population density was 144.7 per square mile. The median age was 41.4 years, with 21.2% of residents under the age of 18 and 19.2% of residents 65 years of age or older; for every 100 females there were 97.0 males and for every 100 females age 18 and over there were 95.6 males.

The racial makeup of the county was 88.0% White, 2.3% Black or African American, 0.5% American Indian and Alaska Native, 1.2% Asian, <0.1% Native Hawaiian and Pacific Islander, 3.0% from some other race, and 5.0% from two or more races. Hispanic or Latino residents of any race comprised 6.4% of the population.

63.7% of residents lived in urban areas, while 36.3% lived in rural areas.

There were 42,824 households in the county, of which 26.8% had children under the age of 18 living in them. Of all households, 49.8% were married-couple households, 19.1% were households with a male householder and no spouse or partner present, and 23.2% were households with a female householder and no spouse or partner present. About 29.5% of all households were made up of individuals and 12.7% had someone living alone who was 65 years of age or older.

There were 45,740 housing units at an average density of 63.6 per square mile, of which 6.4% were vacant. Among occupied housing units, 69.5% were owner-occupied and 30.5% were renter-occupied; the homeowner vacancy rate was 1.1% and the rental vacancy rate was 5.6%.

2000 Census Age Pyramid for Fond du Lac County

=== 2000 census ===
As of the census of 2000, there were 97,296 people, 36,931 households, and 25,482 families residing in the county. The population density was 135 people per square mile (52 people/km^{2}). There were 39,271 housing units at an average density of 54 units per square mile (21 units/km^{2}). The racial makeup of the county was 96.16% White, 0.90% Black or African American, 0.38% Native American, 0.87% Asian, 0.03% Pacific Islander, 0.84% from other races, and 0.82% from two or more races. 2.04% of the population were Hispanic or Latino of any race. 57.7% were of German, 6.1% Irish and 5.3% American ancestry. 95.5% spoke English, 2.1% Spanish and 1.3% German as their first language.

There were 36,931 households, out of which 32.80% had children under the age of 18 living with them, 57.70% were married couples living together, 7.80% had a female householder with no husband present, and 31.00% were non-families. 25.40% of all households were made up of individuals, and 10.80% had someone living alone who was 65 years of age or older. The average household size was 2.52 and the average family size was 3.04.

In the county, the population was spread out, with 25.20% under the age of 18, 9.40% from 18 to 24, 28.70% from 25 to 44, 22.40% from 45 to 64, and 14.30% who were 65 years of age or older. The median age was 37 years. For every 100 females there were 95.30 males. For every 100 females age 18 and over, there were 92.20 males.

In 2017, there were 1,066 births, giving a general fertility rate of 57.7 births per 1000 women aged 15–44, the 20th lowest rate out of all 72 Wisconsin counties. Additionally, there were 74 reported induced abortions performed on women of Fond du Lac County residence in 2017.

== Communities ==
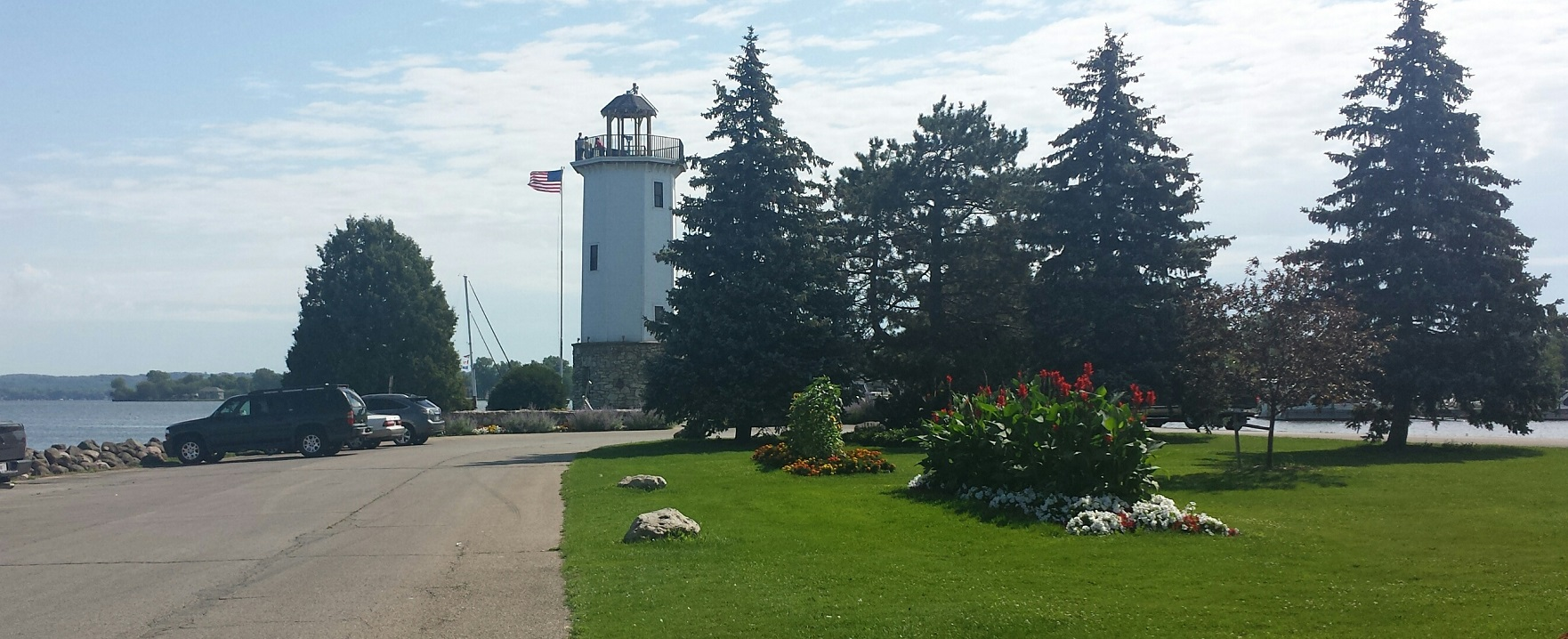
Fond du Lac Lighthouse in Lakeside Park

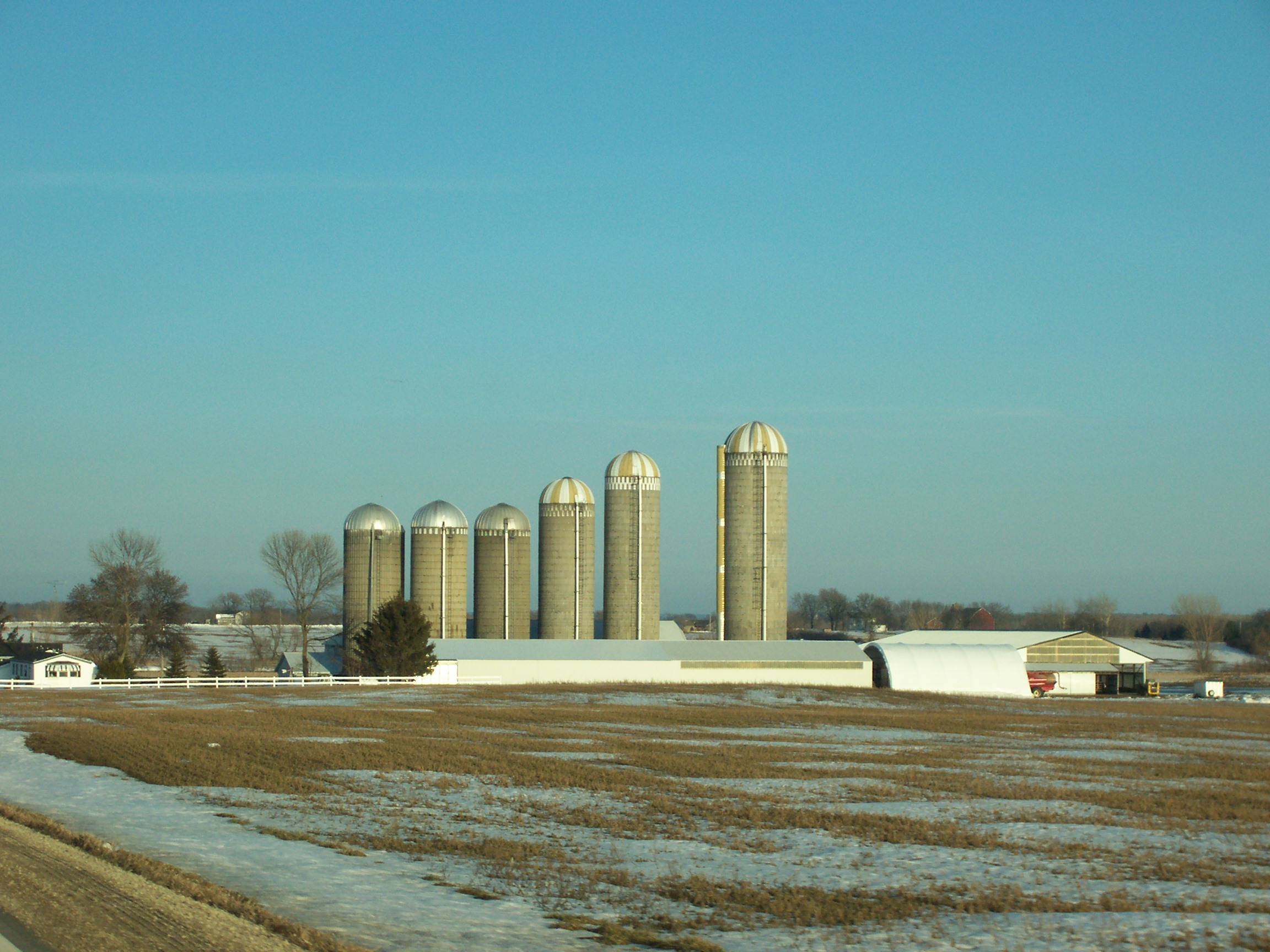
Farming in western Fond du Lac County

=== Cities ===
- Fond du Lac (county seat)
- Ripon
- Waupun (mostly in Dodge County)

=== Villages ===
- Brandon
- Campbellsport
- Eden
- Fairwater
- Kewaskum (mostly in Washington County)
- Mount Calvary
- North Fond du Lac
- Oakfield
- Rosendale
- St. Cloud

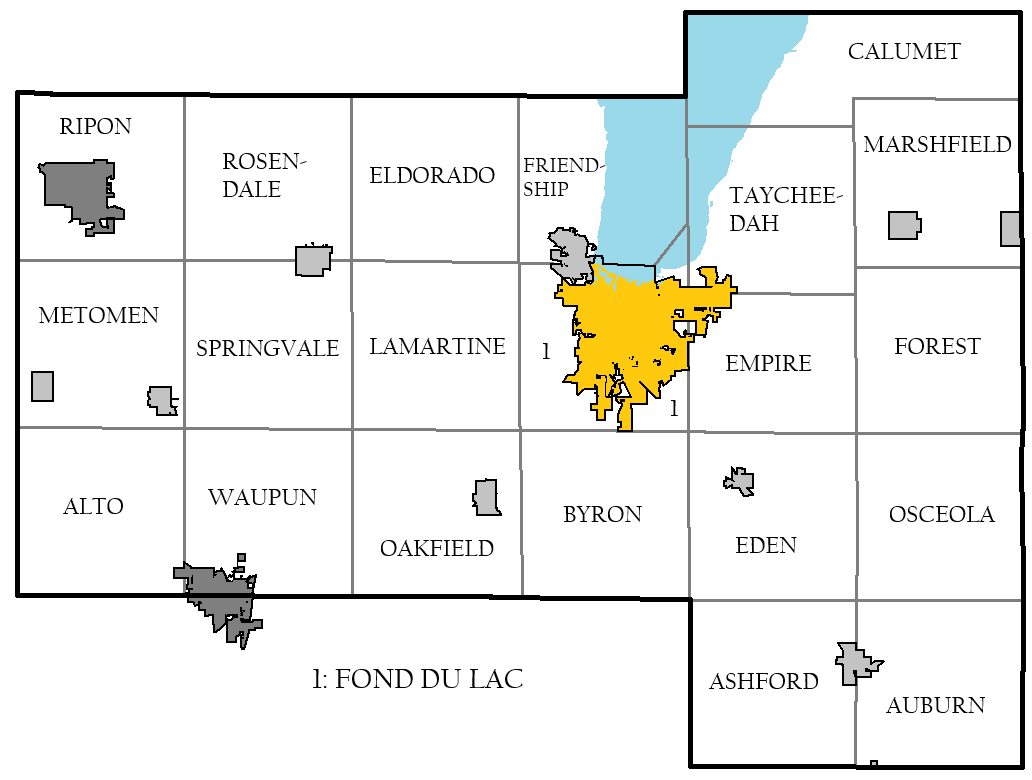
Towns of Fond du Lac County

=== Towns ===
- Alto
- Ashford
- Auburn
- Byron
- Calumet
- Eden
- Eldorado
- Empire
- Fond du Lac
- Forest
- Friendship
- Lamartine
- Marshfield
- Metomen
- Oakfield
- Osceola
- Ripon
- Rosendale
- Springvale
- Taycheedah
- Waupun

=== Census-designated places ===
- Alto
- St. Peter
- Taycheedah
- Van Dyne

=== Unincorporated communities ===
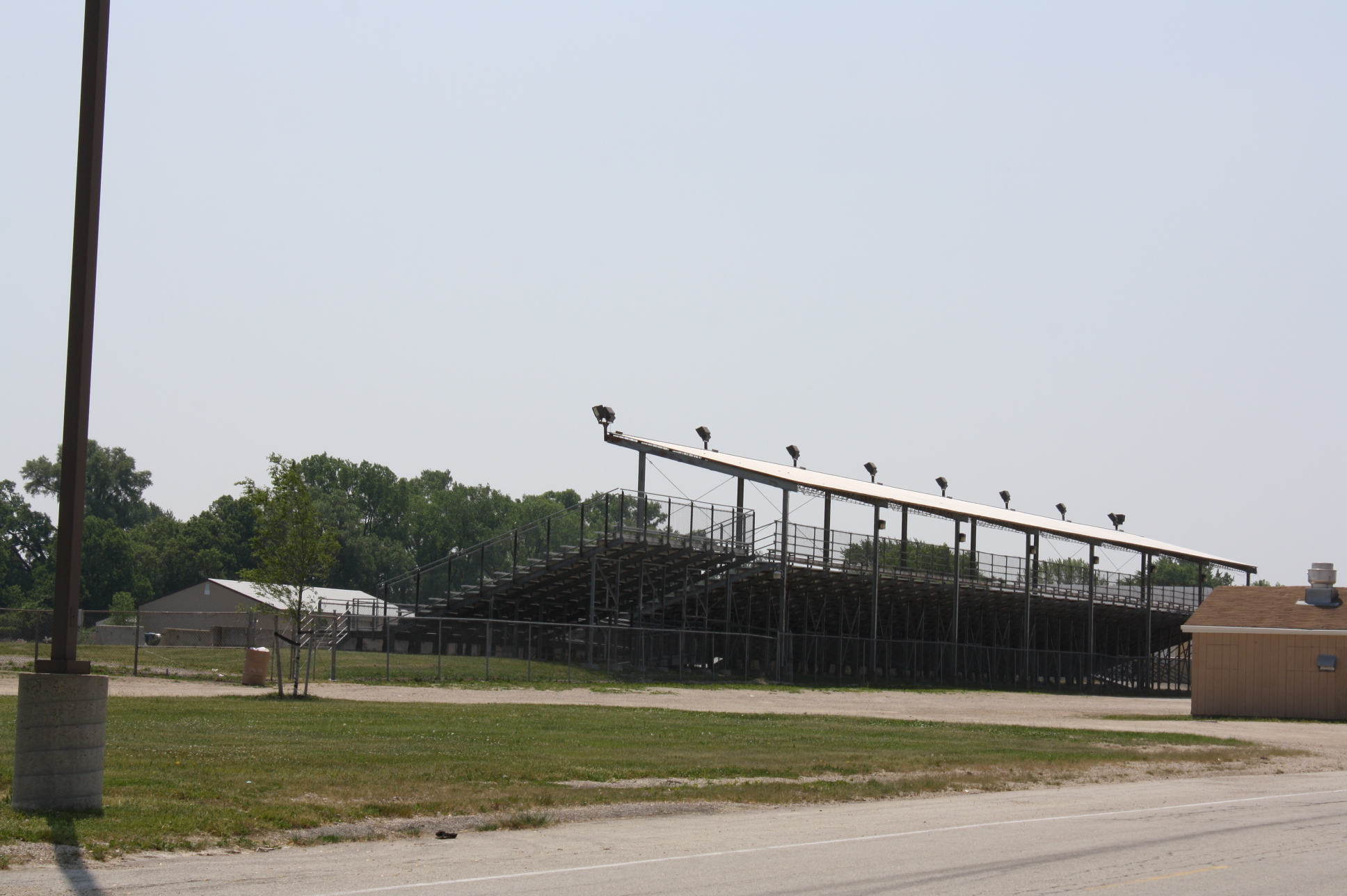
Grandstands for the Fond du Lac County Fair

- Arcade Acres
- Armstrong
- Artesia Beach
- Ashford
- Banner
- Bergen Beach
- Byron
- Calumet Harbor
- Calumetville
- Calvary
- Chinatown
- Dexter
- Dotyville
- Dundee
- Eldorado
- Elmore
- Garnet
- Gladstone Beach
- Graham Corners
- Hamilton
- Highland Park
- Hopokoekau Beach
- Johnsburg
- Ladoga
- Laudolff Beach
- Luco
- Malone
- Marblehead
- Marytown
- Metomen
- Minawa Beach
- New Fane
- New Prospect
- Oak Center
- Peebles
- Pipe
- Pukwana Beach
- Rogersville
- Rosendale Center
- St. Joe
- Silica
- South Byron
- Waucousta
- Welling Beach
- West Rosendale
- Wilmoore Heights
- Winnebago Heights
- Winnebago Park
- Woodhull

=== Ghost towns/neighborhoods ===
- Ceresco
- New Cassel
- Reeds Corners

== Education ==
School districts include:

- Campbellsport School District
- Fond du Lac School District
- Kewaskum School District
- Lomira School District
- Markesan School District
- New Holstein School District
- North Fond du Lac School District
- Oakfield School District
- Ripon Area School District
- Rosendale-Brandon School District
- Waupun School District

Public high schools within the county include:

- Campbellsport High School
- Fond Du Lac High School
- Horace Mann High School
- Ripon High School

== Government and politics ==
United States presidential election results for Fond du Lac County, Wisconsin
Year	Republican		Democratic		Third party(ies)	
Year	No.	%	No.	%	No.	%
1892	4,129	42.47%	5,254	54.04%	339	3.49%
1896	6,174	54.15%	4,933	43.27%	294	2.58%
1900	6,258	53.82%	5,140	44.20%	230	1.98%
1904	7,027	59.58%	4,417	37.45%	350	2.97%
1908	5,872	50.86%	5,194	44.99%	479	4.15%
1912	3,014	31.34%	4,838	50.31%	1,764	18.34%
1916	5,781	52.16%	5,021	45.30%	282	2.54%
1920	12,543	74.58%	3,409	20.27%	867	5.15%
1924	8,516	41.62%	2,222	10.86%	9,722	47.52%
1928	12,593	51.36%	11,719	47.80%	205	0.84%
1932	8,436	33.74%	16,143	64.56%	425	1.70%
1936	9,179	35.40%	14,821	57.16%	1,931	7.45%
1940	16,804	61.46%	10,323	37.76%	215	0.79%
1944	16,785	63.81%	9,378	35.65%	143	0.54%
1948	13,760	59.61%	8,904	38.57%	419	1.82%
1952	22,794	74.43%	7,724	25.22%	107	0.35%
1956	21,496	72.46%	7,940	26.76%	230	0.78%
1960	19,498	59.65%	13,132	40.17%	58	0.18%
1964	12,708	41.29%	18,040	58.61%	30	0.10%
1968	18,184	55.59%	12,563	38.41%	1,962	6.00%
1972	21,007	60.99%	12,050	34.99%	1,386	4.02%
1976	22,226	55.79%	16,571	41.59%	1,044	2.62%
1980	24,196	56.97%	15,293	36.01%	2,981	7.02%
1984	26,069	64.61%	13,983	34.66%	294	0.73%
1988	21,985	57.59%	15,887	41.62%	303	0.79%
1992	19,785	44.45%	13,757	30.91%	10,964	24.63%
1996	16,488	44.65%	15,542	42.08%	4,901	13.27%
2000	26,548	56.98%	18,181	39.02%	1,860	3.99%
2004	33,291	62.77%	19,216	36.23%	529	1.00%
2008	28,164	53.83%	23,463	44.84%	696	1.33%
2012	30,355	56.84%	22,379	41.91%	668	1.25%
2016	31,022	59.89%	17,387	33.57%	3,387	6.54%
2020	35,754	62.45%	20,588	35.96%	909	1.59%
2024	37,272	63.68%	20,495	35.02%	760	1.30%

Fond du Lac County is governed by a twenty-five-member Board of Supervisors and an elected County Executive, all of whom are elected in nonpartisan elections. The other countywide officials, including the Sheriff and District Attorney, run in partisan elections.

As Ripon's Little White Schoolhouse was the birthplace of the Republican Party in 1854, the GOP has long been the dominant party in Fond du Lac County. Since 1896 when the county broke a 20 year streak of voting Democratic, outside 1912 (when the Republican vote was split by Theodore Roosevelt's run as part of the Bull Moose Party), Franklin D. Roosevelt's first two terms, and Lyndon Johnson winning the county in 1964, along with state Progressive Robert M. La Follette's win in 1924, the majority of Fond du Lac County voters have chosen the Republican candidate.

Fond du Lac County Elected Officials
Office	Officeholder	Party
Executive	Sam Kaufman	Nonpartisan
Sheriff	Ryan F. Waldschmidt	Republican
Clerk	Lisa Freiberg	Republican
Treasurer	Brenda Schneider	Republican
Register of Deeds	Jim Krebs	Republican
Clerk of Circuit Court	Ramona Geib	Republican
District Attorney	Eric Toney	Republican

Fond du Lac County Board of Supervisors
Name	District
Kat Griffith	District 1
Gary A. Will	District 2
Karen Madigan	District 3
Michael J. Will	District 4
Sarah Ann Smith	District 5
Michael Beer	District 6
Jonathon Venhuizen	District 7
Bob Simon	District 8
Thomas Dornbrook	District 9
Ken Depperman	District 10
Steven A. Abel	District 11
Dennis Stenz	District 12
John J. Rickert	District 13
Michael Conley	District 14
Joseph Fenrick	District 15
Mike Streetar	District 16
Jay John Myrechuck	District 17
Scott Rodman	District 18
Tom Herlache	District 19
Tiffany Brault	District 20
Dean P. Will	District 21
Caroline M. Janke	District 22
Martin S. Ryan	District 23
Mary B. Hayes	District 24
Angela C. Luehring	District 25

== See also ==
- National Register of Historic Places listings in Fond du Lac County, Wisconsin
- Wisconsin Phalanx
