= Wisconsin Highway 149 =

State highway in Wisconsin, United States

State Trunk Highway 149

Route information
- Maintained by WisDOT
- Length: 40.1 mi (64.5 km)
- Existed: 1923–2006

Major junctions
- West end: US 151 near Fond Du Lac
- WIS 32 / WIS 57 through Kiel; WIS 67 in Kiel; WIS 42 near Meeme
- East end: I-43 in Cleveland

Location
- Country: United States
- State: Wisconsin

Highway system
- Wisconsin State Trunk Highway System; Interstate; US; State; Scenic; Rustic
← WIS 148	→ WIS 150

State Trunk Highway 149 (Highway 149, STH-149 or WIS 149) was a state highway in the U.S. state of Wisconsin. It ran through 40.1 miles (64.5 km) of Manitowoc, Calumet, and Fond du Lac counties.

== History ==
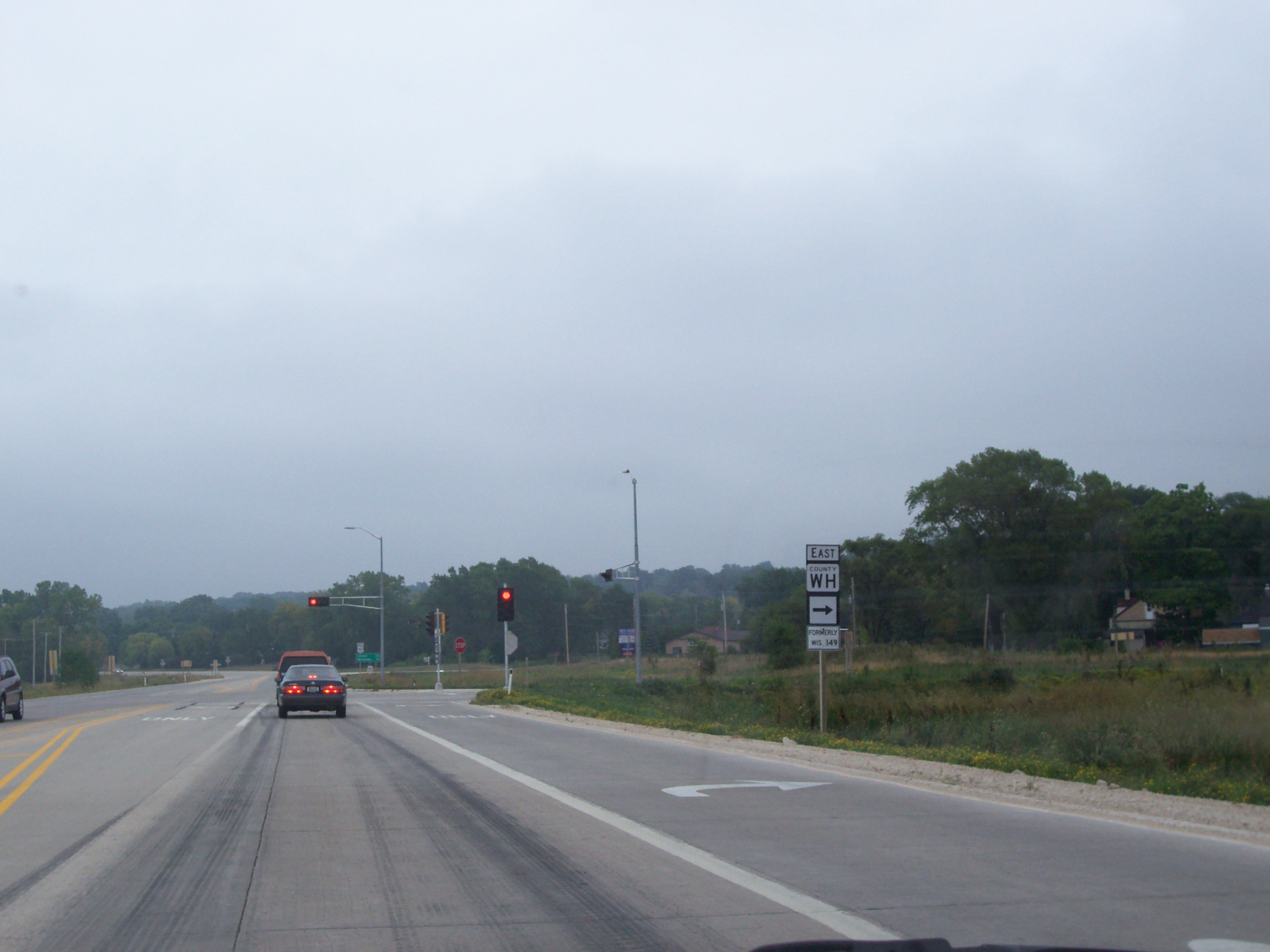
Western terminus near Fond du Lac, Wisconsin

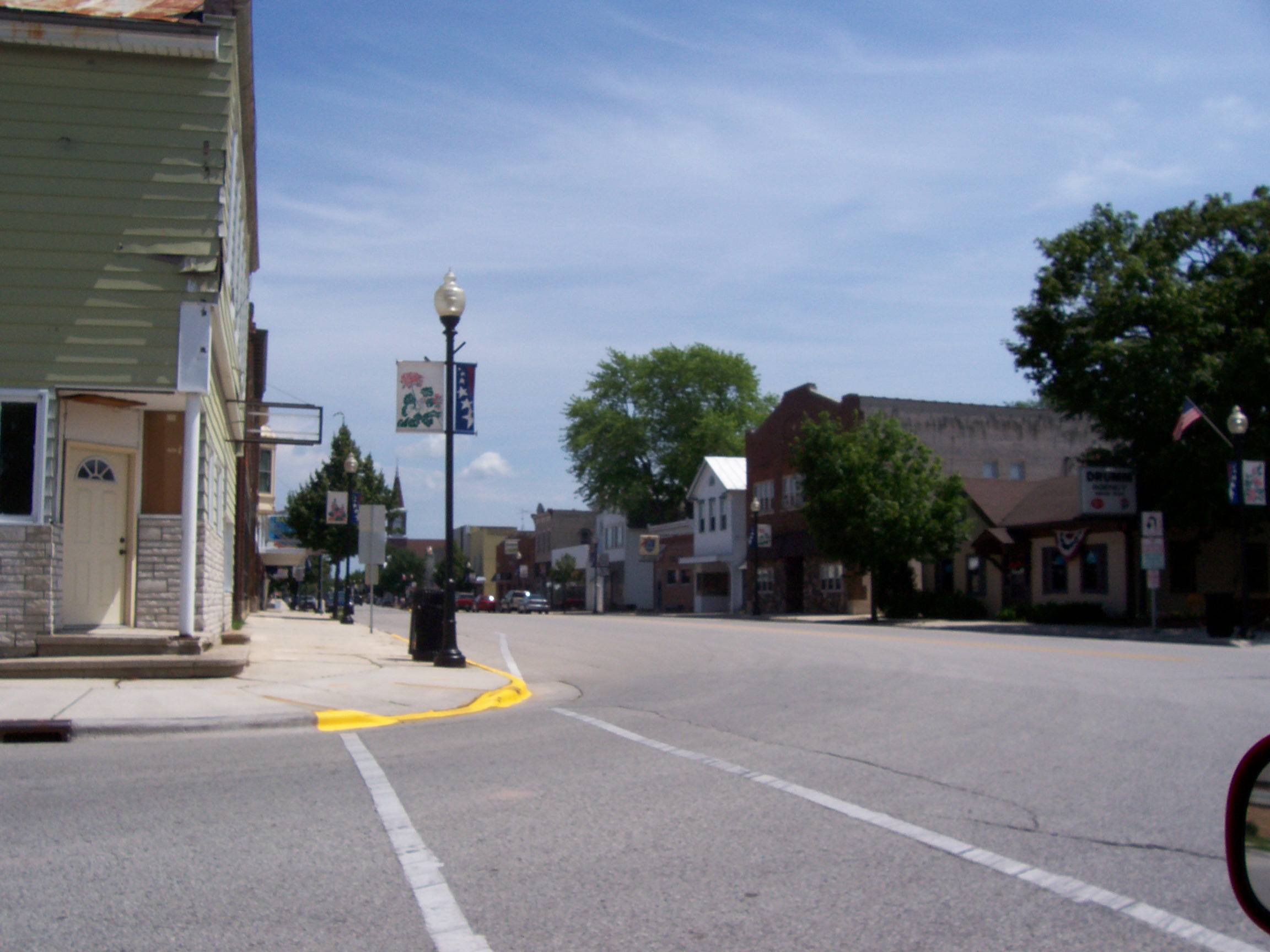
Original western terminus, later eastern terminus in Kiel, Wisconsin

In 1923, WIS 149 ran from WIS 57 (today's WIS 32/WIS 57) in Kiel to WIS 17 (then US 141, now Westview Street east of today's I-43) in St. Wendel (now Cleveland). In 1938, part of the route near Kiel was straightened to follow today's County Trunk Highway XX (CTH-XX). In 1947, WIS 149 was extended westward to US 151/WIS 55 (now just US 151) in Peebles, superseding CTH-U, CTH-I, and a part of CTH-HH. Also, WIS 149 was extended eastward via Westvie Street and Washington Street to present-day CTH-LS just west of the shore of Lake Michigan. In 1979, WIS 149 was removed east of the newly built I-43. As a result, the former connection to Cleveland was downgraded to CTH-XX. By 1987, WIS 149 was shortened even further to end at WIS 32/WIS 57 in Kiel. As a result, CTH-XX extended west to WIS 67 near Kiel.

The road was turned back to local control in 2006. The highway, since then, was designated as multiple county routes. County HH was extended from Marytown to Kiel, Fond du Lac County G took over primary signage on the portion concurrent with the highway (from Marytown to just west of St. Joe), and Fond du Lac County created County WH for the remainder.

== Major intersections ==
This junction list shows the pre-1987 routing.

County	Location	mi	km	Destinations	Notes
Fond du Lac	Peebles			US 151 – Fond du Lac, Manitowoc, Chilton	
Manitowoc	Kiel			WIS 32 north / WIS 57 north – Green Bay, Chilton	Western end of WIS 32/57 concurrency
Manitowoc	Kiel			WIS 32 south / WIS 57 south / WIS 67 south – Sheboygan, Milwaukee, Plymouth	Eastern end of WIS 32/57 concurrency; southern end of WIS 67 concurrency
Manitowoc	Kiel			WIS 67 north	Northern end of WIS 67 concurrency
Manitowoc	Meeme			WIS 42 north – Manitowoc, Sturgeon Bay, Osman	Northern end of WIS 42 concurrency
Manitowoc	Meeme			WIS 42 south – Howards Grove, Sheboygan, Edwards	Southern end of WIS 42 concurrency
Manitowoc	Cleveland			I-43 – Milwaukee, Green Bay, Manitowoc	
1.000 mi = 1.609 km; 1.000 km = 0.621 mi
