= Taycheedah (CDP), Wisconsin =

Census-designated place in Wisconsin, United States

Taycheedah, Wisconsin
- Census-designated place
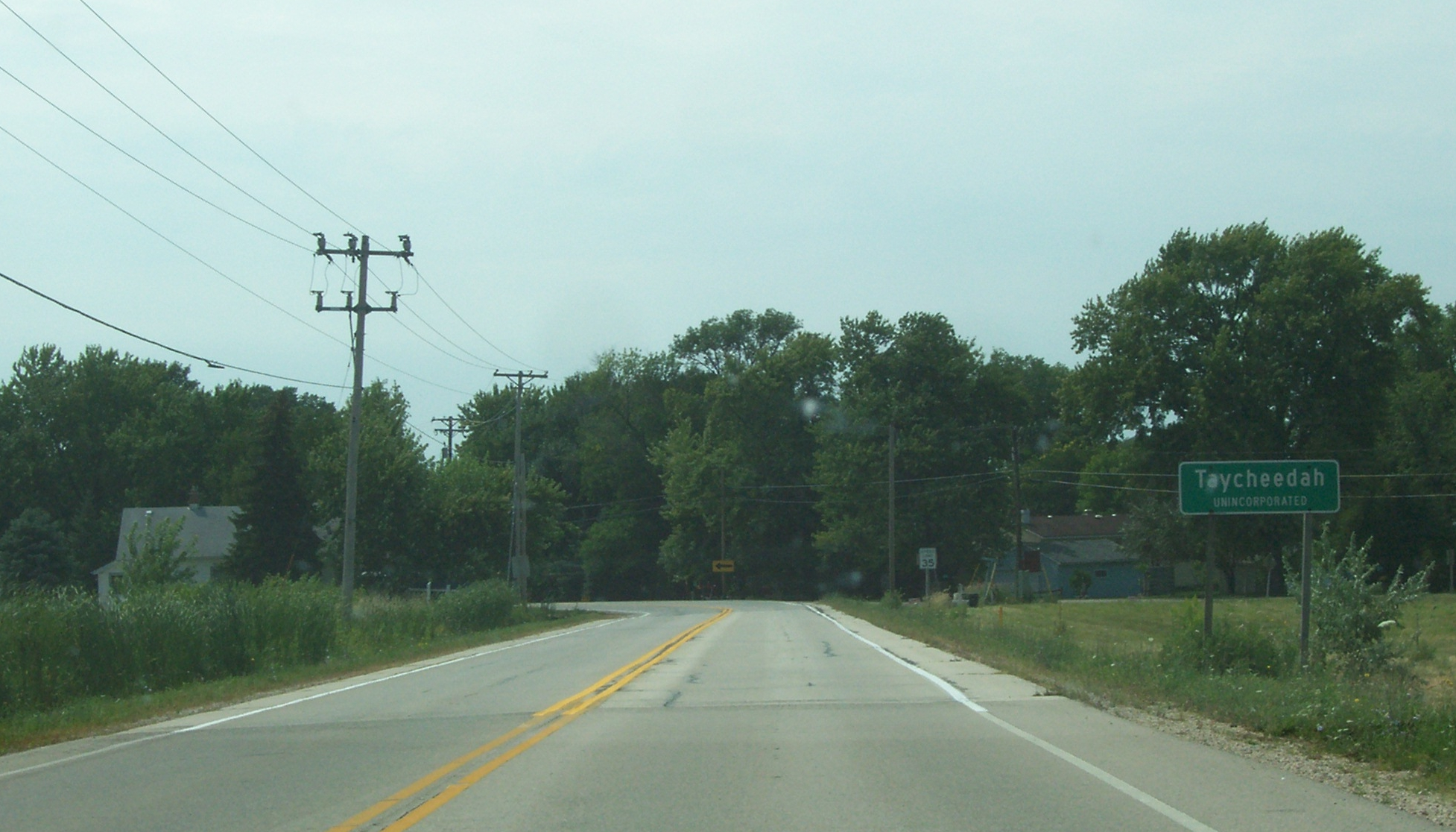
- Taycheedah, Wisconsin

- Location within Wisconsin
- Coordinates: 43°48′32″N 88°23′42″W
- Country: United States
- State: Wisconsin
- County: Fond du Lac

Area
  - Total: 1.090 sq mi (2.82 km^{2})
  - Land: 0.729 sq mi (1.89 km^{2})
  - Water: 0.361 sq mi (0.93 km^{2})
- Elevation: 751 ft (229 m)

Population (2020)
  - Total: 643
  - Density: 882/sq mi (341/km^{2})
- Time zone: UTC-6 (Central (CST))
  - Summer (DST): UTC-5 (CDT)
- Zip codes: 54935
- Area code: 920
- GNIS feature ID: 1575265

Taycheedah is an unincorporated census-designated place in the Town of Taycheedah in Fond du Lac County, Wisconsin, United States. The community is located adjacent to the city of Fond du Lac and Lake Winnebago. As of the 2020 census, its population was 643, down from 704 at the 2010 census. Taycheedah calls itself the "Sheepshead Fishing Center of the World". U.S. Route 151 ran through the community until a bypass around Fond du Lac was built in the 2000s.

Taycheedah Correctional Institution is located in the town of Taycheedah, several miles east of the community.

== History ==
The first white settlement at Taycheedah was made in 1839. A post office called Taycheedah was established in 1841, and remained in operation until it was discontinued in 1986. The name Taycheedah is derived from a Native American word meaning "lake camp".

== Images ==
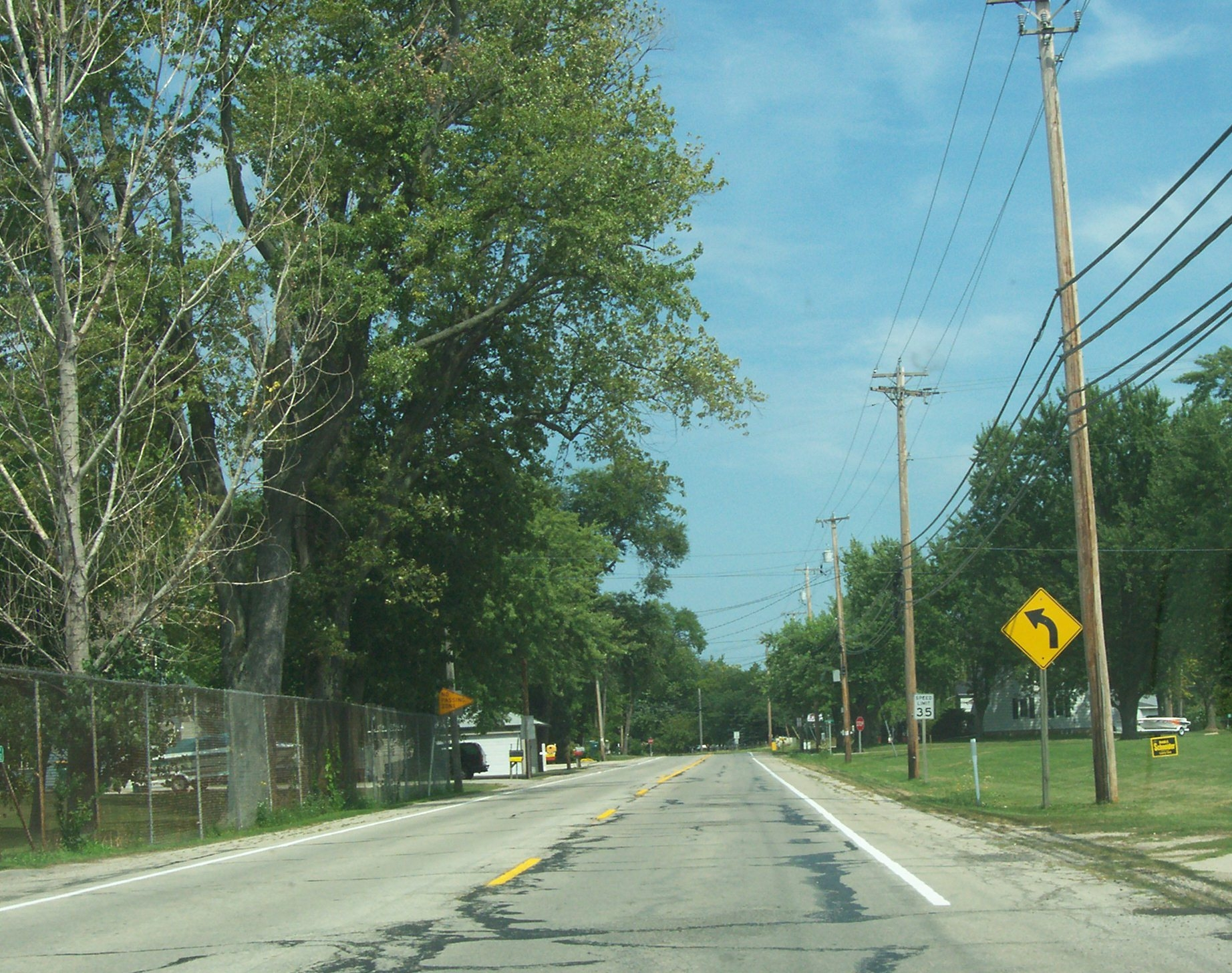
Looking east

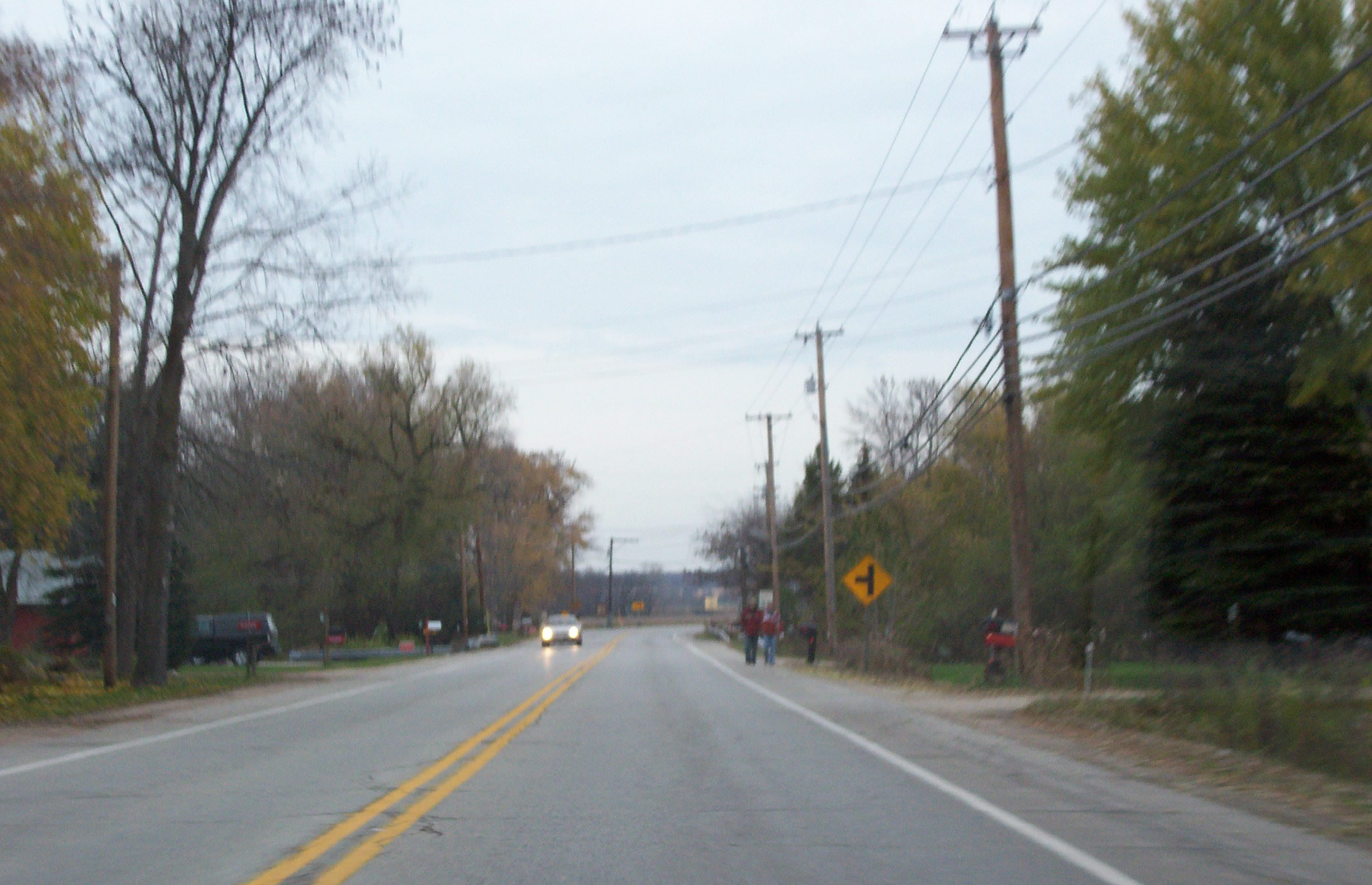
Looking northeast

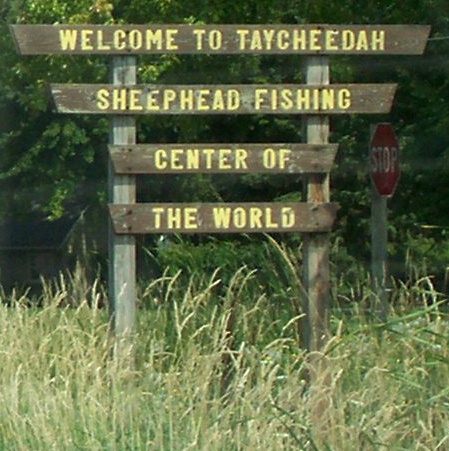
Welcome sign
