= Calvary, Wisconsin =

- Unincorporated community
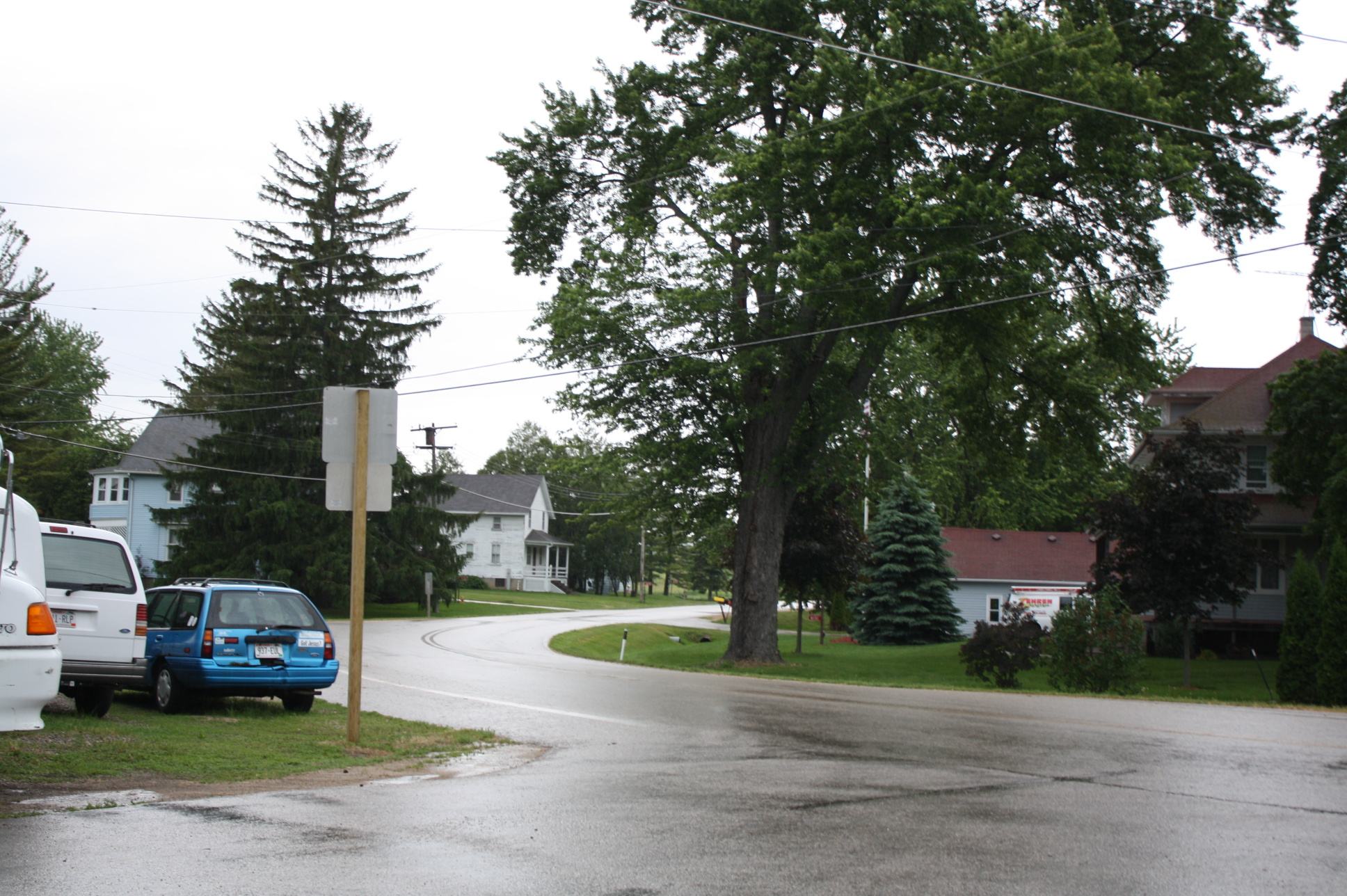
- Downtown Calvary

- Location within Wisconsin Location within the United States
- Coordinates: 43°50′48″N 88°14′38″W
- Country: United States
- State: Wisconsin
- County: Fond du Lac
- Time zone: UTC-6 (Central (CST))
  - Summer (DST): UTC-5 (CDT)
- Area code: 920

Calvary, Wisconsin is an unincorporated community located in the town of Marshfield, in Fond du Lac County, Wisconsin, United States. The community was originally known locally as Calvary Station since the community was built around the railroad depot for Mount Calvary. The depot for the Sheboygan-Fond du Lac Railroad needed to be built approximately one mile (2 km) north of the community because of the grade needed for trains to climb the Niagara Escarpment. It is located at the intersection of County Highways WW and WH (which was named Wisconsin Highway 149 before the highway was decommissioned in the 2000s). It is located in the heart of the Blue Sky Green Field Wind Farm in Wisconsin's Holyland Region.

== Images ==
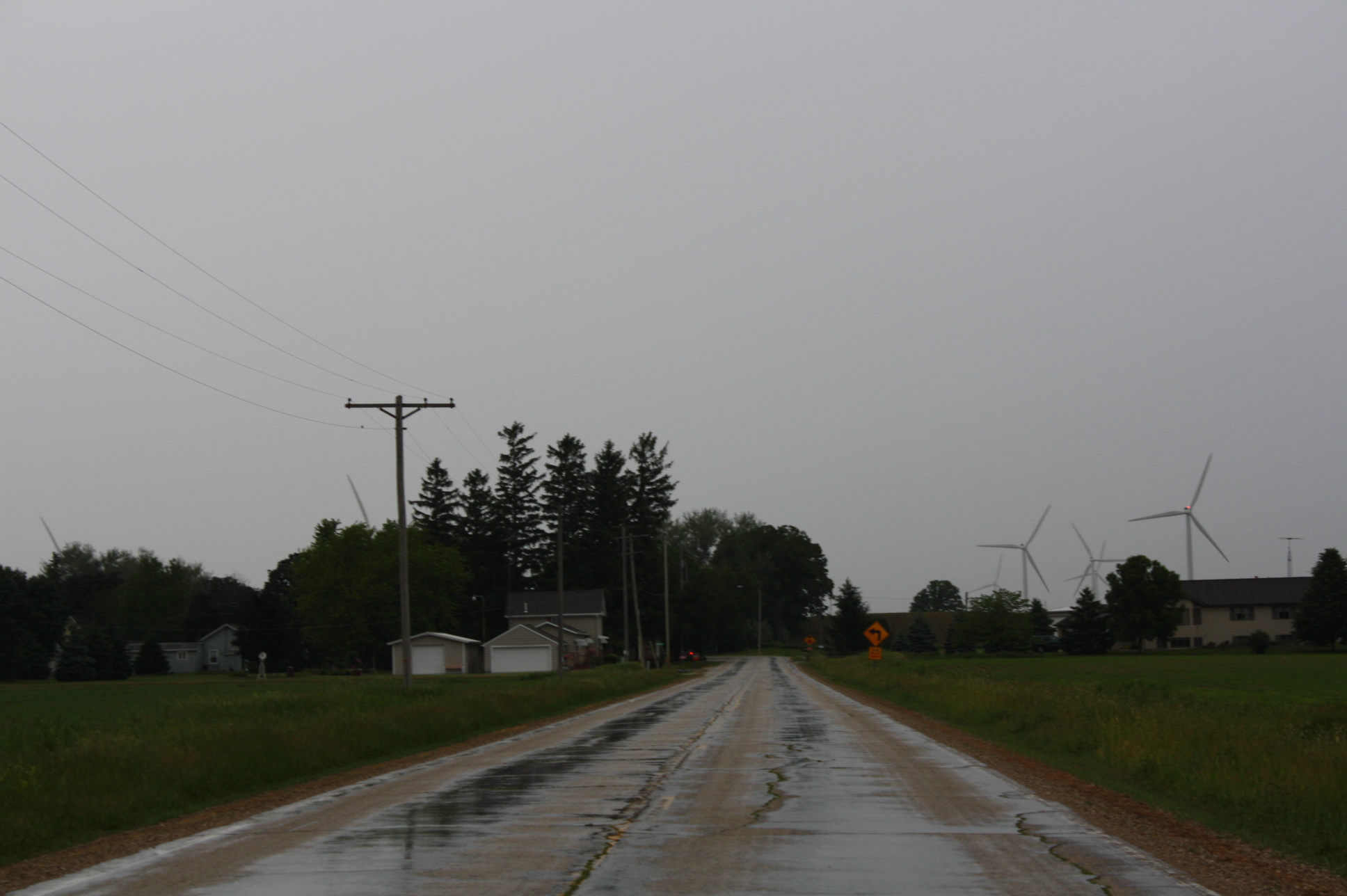
Looking north at Calvary with the Blue Sky Green Field Wind Farm turbines

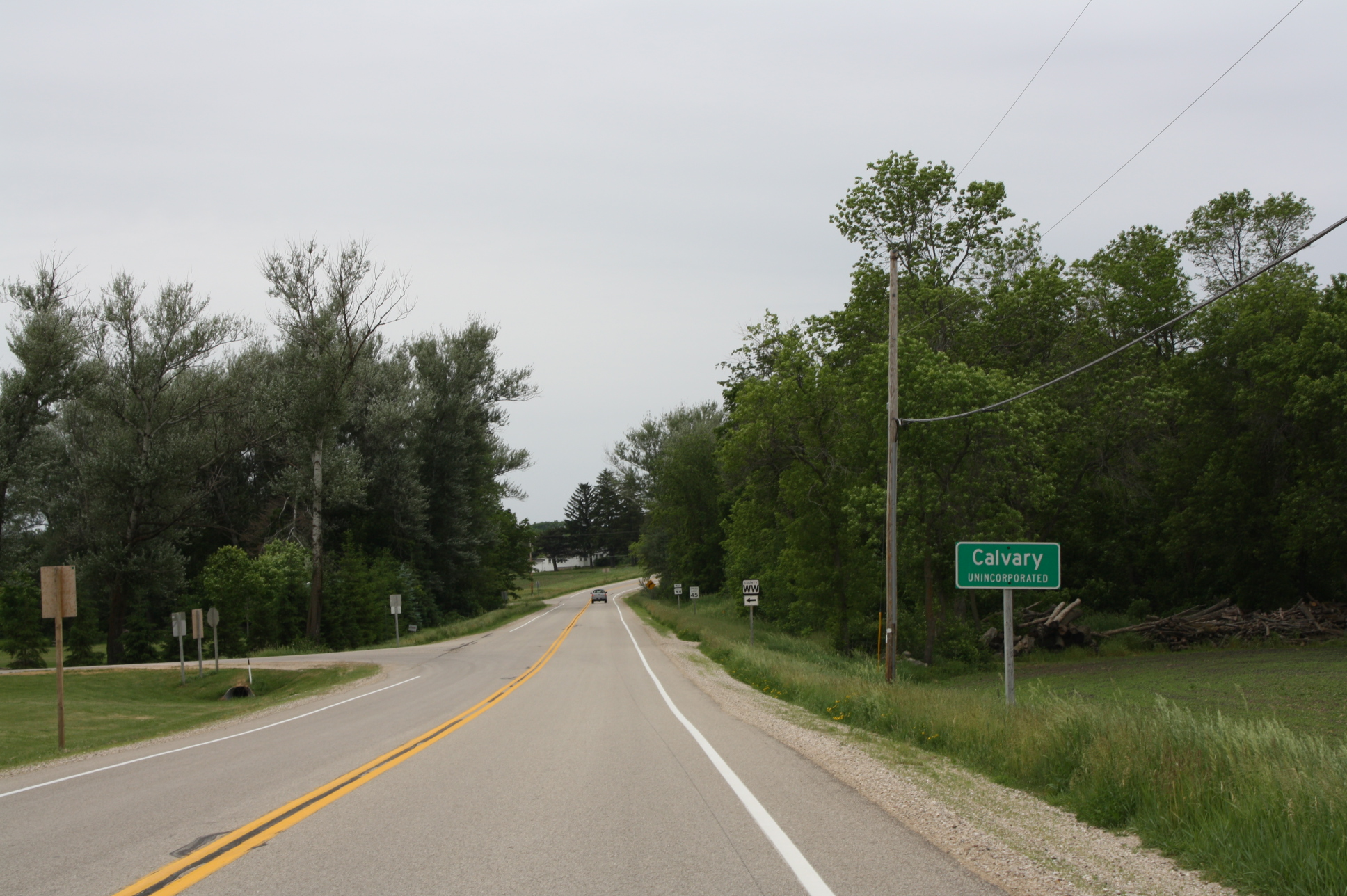
Looking west at the welcome sign along County WH
