= Johnsburg, Wisconsin =

- Unincorporated community
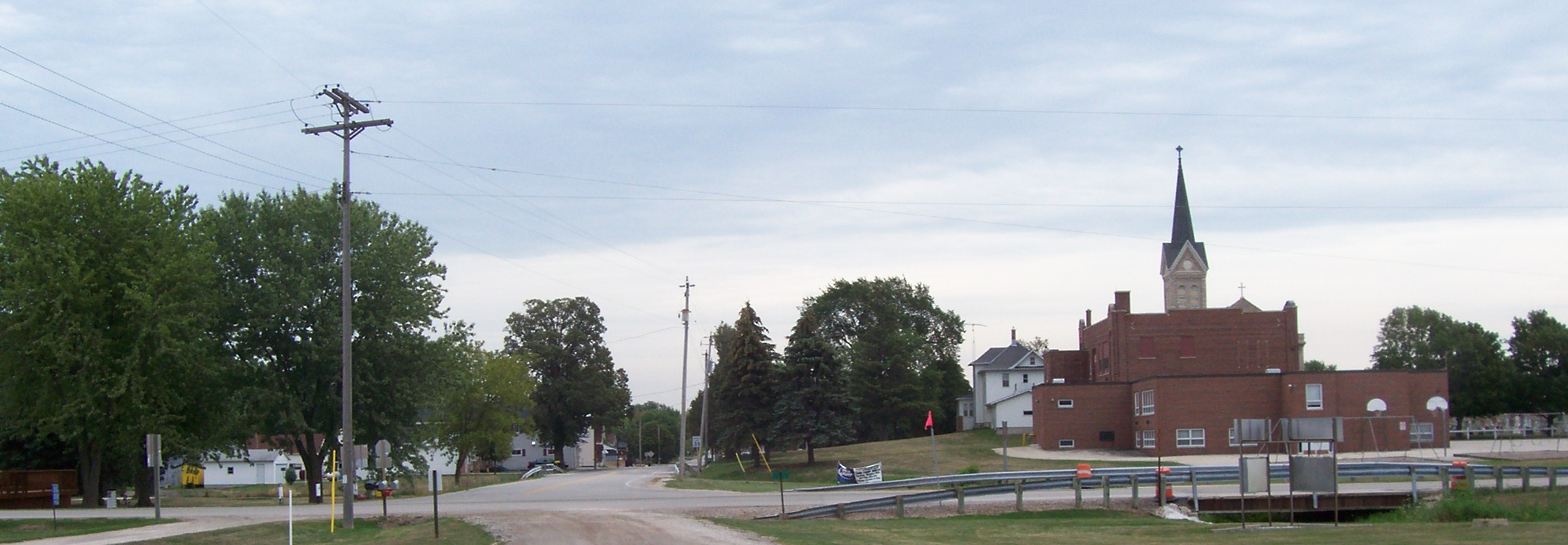
- Johnsburg, Wisconsin

- Location within Wisconsin Location within the United States
- Coordinates: 43°52′38″N 88°17′23″W
- Country: United States
- State: Wisconsin
- County: Fond du Lac
- Elevation: 945 ft (288 m)
- Time zone: UTC-6 (Central (CST))
  - Summer (DST): UTC-5 (CDT)
- Zip codes: 53049, 54937
- Area code: 920
- GNIS feature ID: 1567207

Johnsburg is an unincorporated community in the Town of Calumet in Fond du Lac County, Wisconsin, United States. The community is located on County Roads Q and W, approximately 3.3 miles (5.3 km) east of Lake Winnebago, 2.75 miles (4.43 km) southeast of Pipe and 1.4 miles (2.3 km) northwest of Malone. Johnsburg is part of the Holyland region in northeastern Fond du Lac county.

== Church / history ==
St. John the Baptist Catholic Church is a prominent building in Johnsburg. It is listed on the National Register of Historic Places as number 80000137.

The congregation was founded by six families in 1841. When built in 1842, the church was the first in the approximately 100 miles (160 kilometers) between Milwaukee and Green Bay. Named after the church, St. Johannes Gemeinde (St. John's congregation), the community was known as Hinesburg. Father Deisenrieder had a post office established and the town received its original name to honor his birthplace in Bavaria. The United States Postal Service changed their methods in 1885 and the community was renamed "Johnsburg".

== Notable people ==
- Evan Vogds, football player

== Images ==
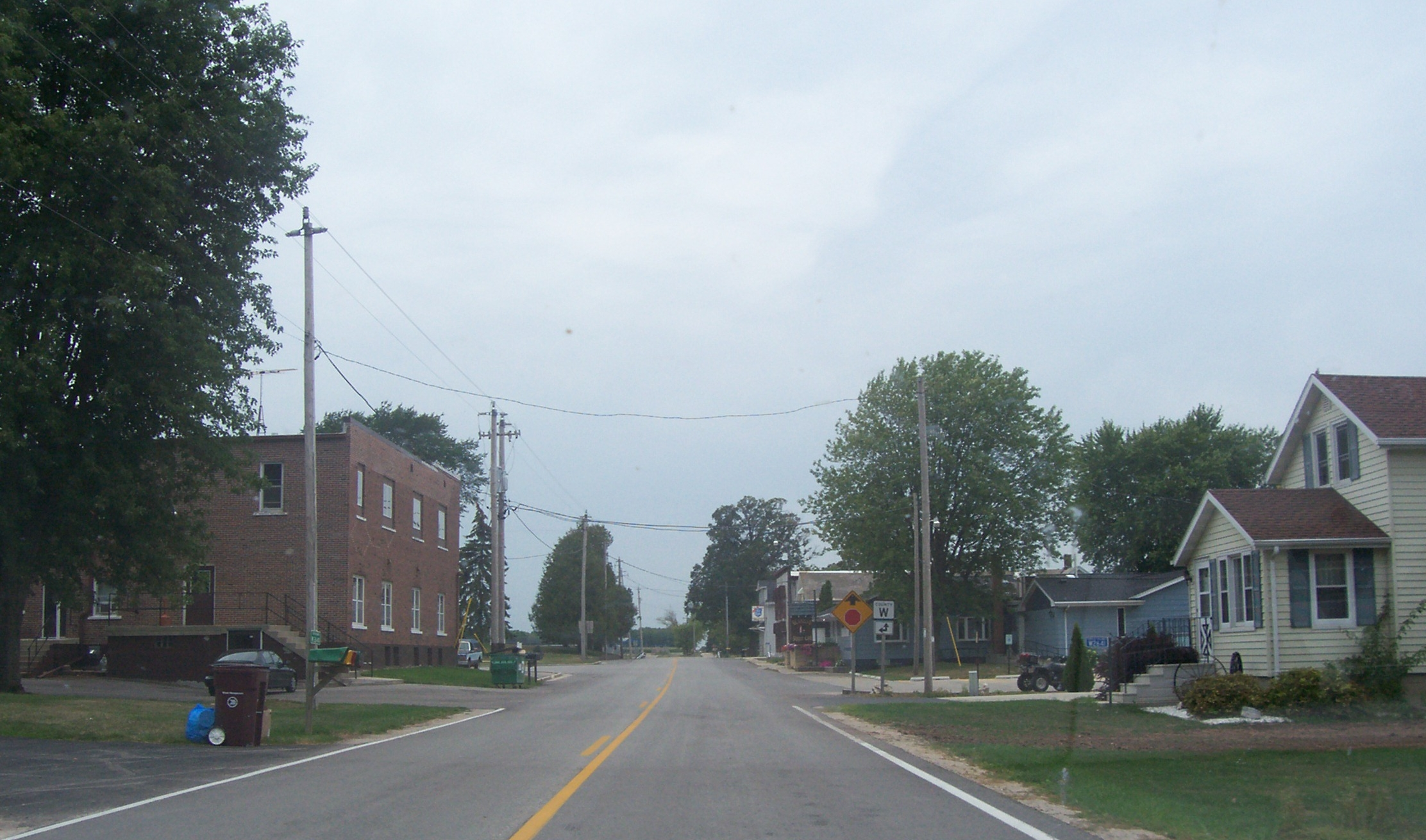
Looking west at downtown Johnsburg

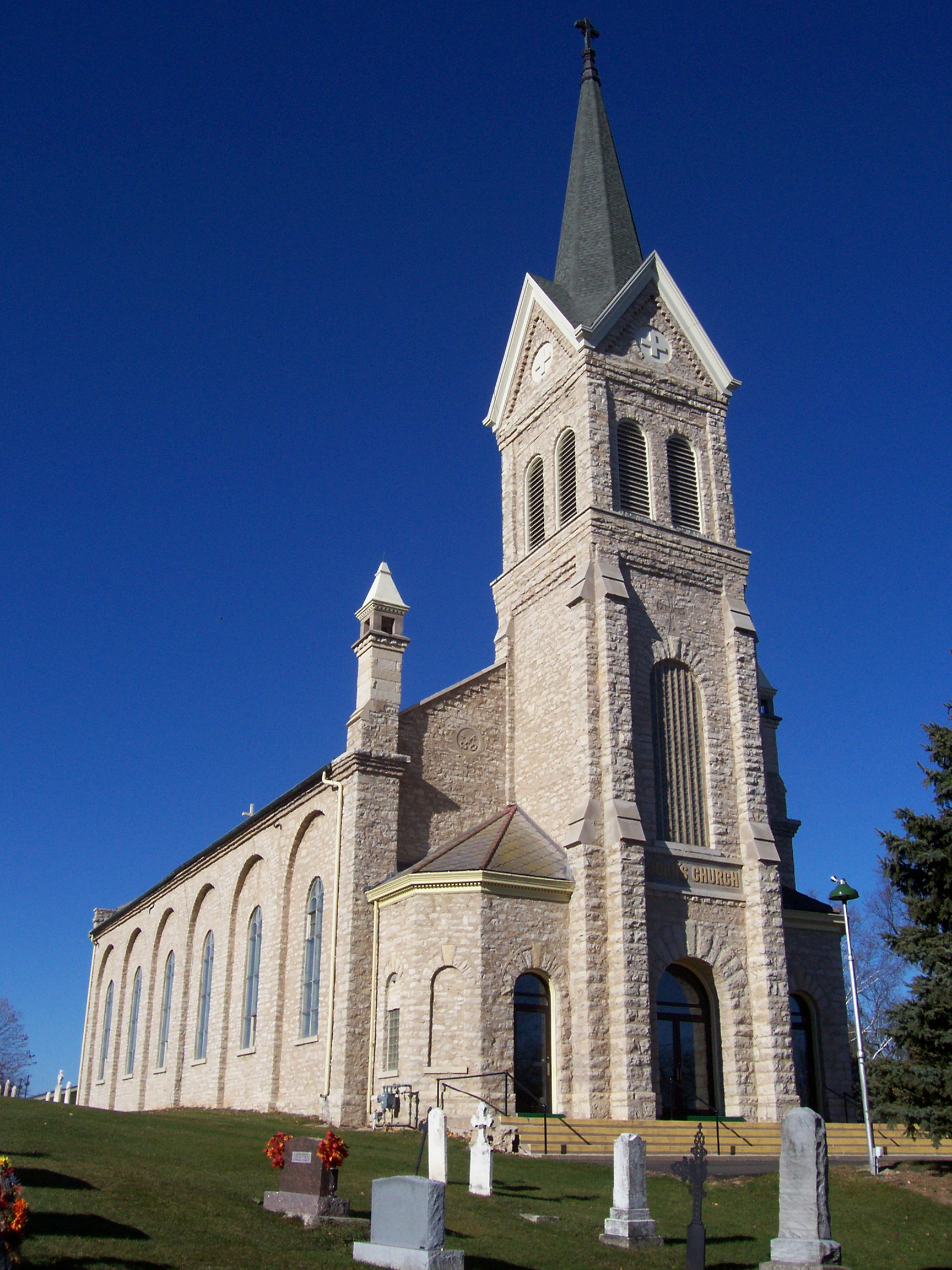
St. John the Baptist Catholic Church

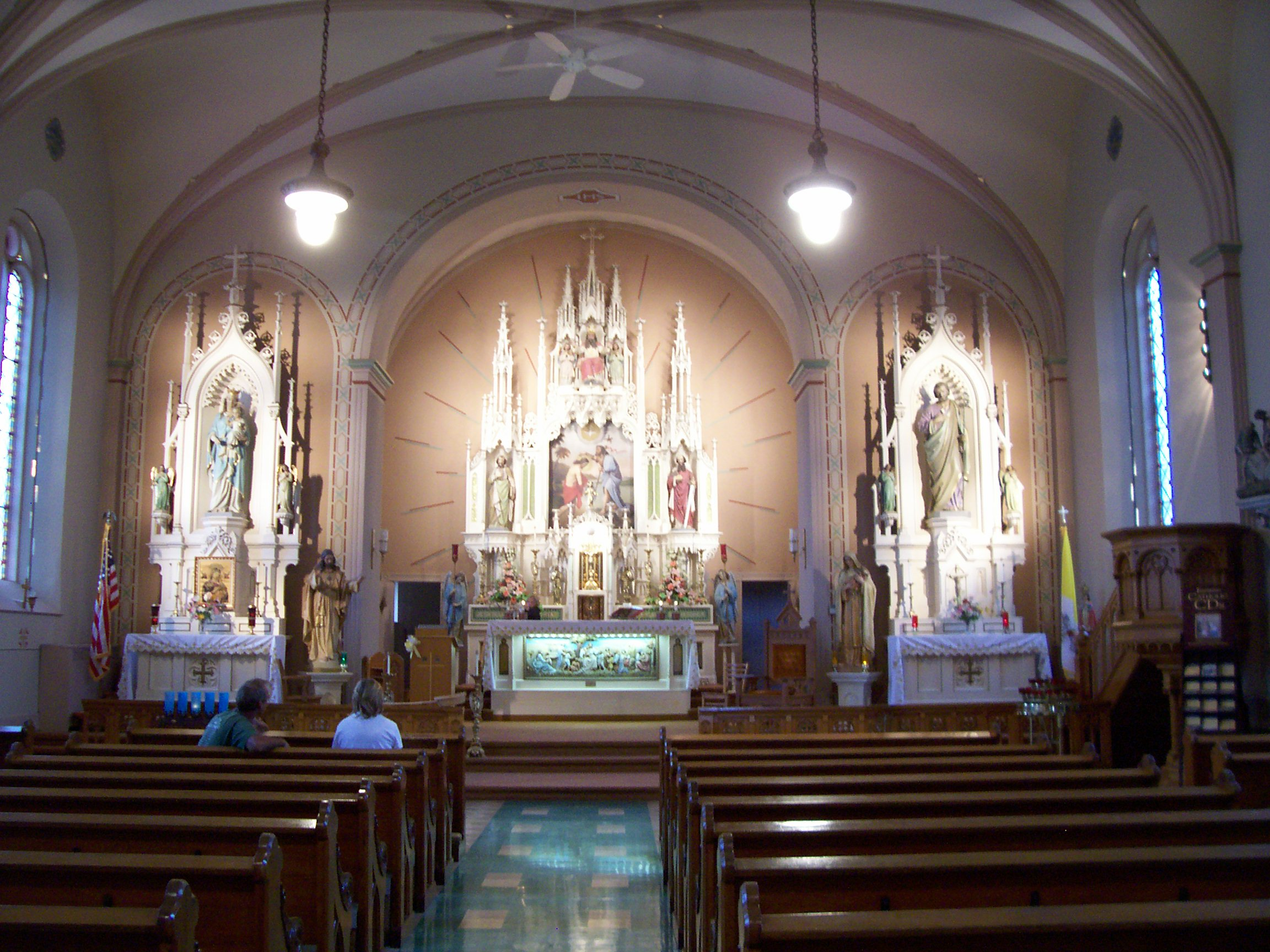
The interior of the St. John the Baptist Roman Catholic Church in Johnsburg, Wisconsin, & it was built in the CE.1850s so the architecture is in public domain.

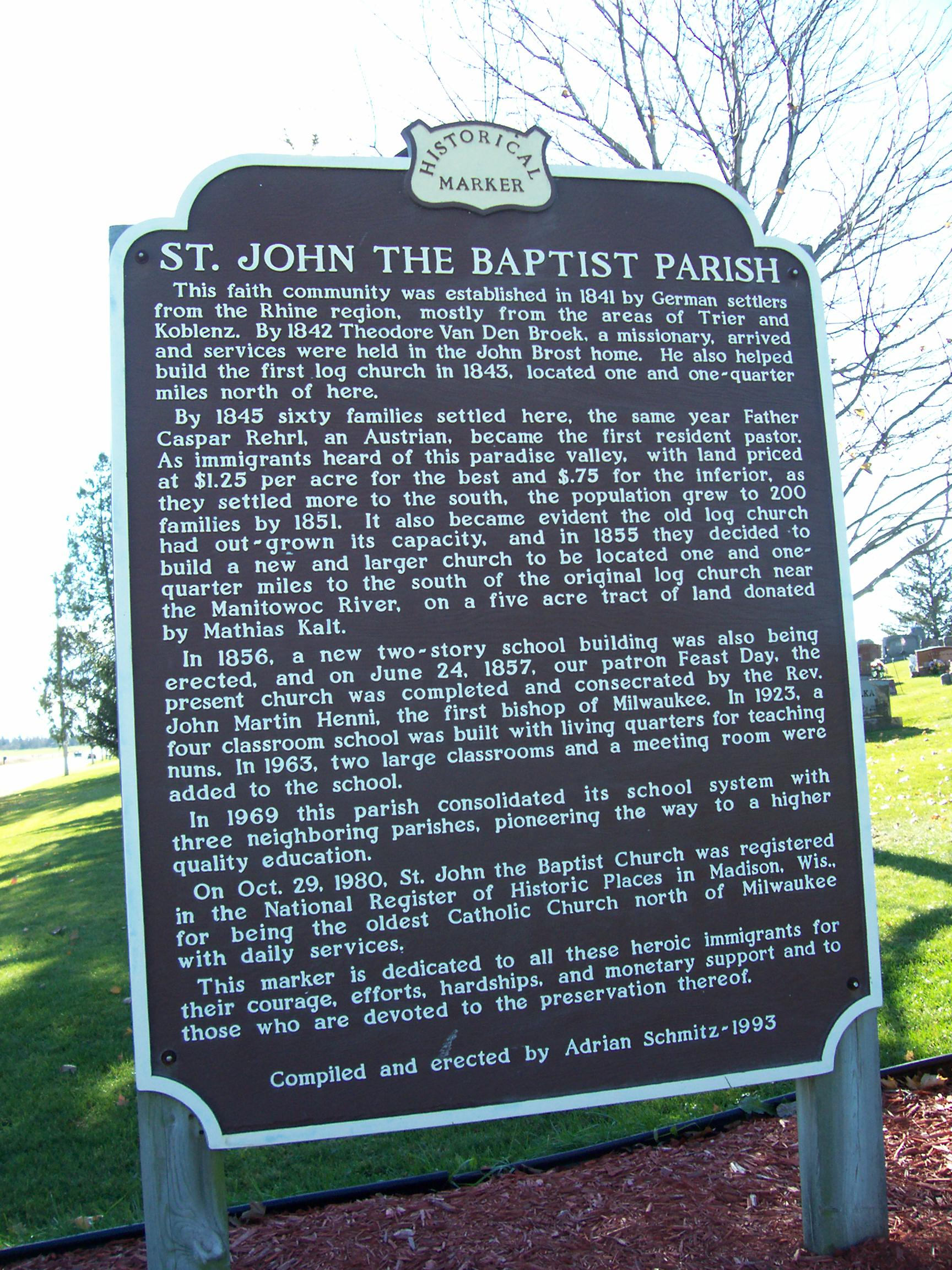
St.John the Baptist Parish R.H.P. Marker

== Sources ==
- St. John the Baptist Congregation, Rev. Benjamin J. Blied, 1980
