= Onion River (Sheboygan River tributary) =

River in Wisconsin, United States

Coordinates: 43.72361°N 87.80425°W

The Onion River is a 36.8-mile-long (59.2 km) tributary of the Sheboygan River in eastern Wisconsin in the United States. Via the Sheboygan, it is part of the watershed of Lake Michigan.

== Course ==
The Onion River flows for its entire length in Sheboygan County. It is formed in the town of Lyndon by the confluence of Mill Creek and Ben Nutt Creek, and initially flows southeastwardly, passing through the village of Waldo and then passes through the village of Hingham. Near Cedar Grove it turns northeastwardly for the remainder of its course, passing through the village of Gibbsville before joining the Sheboygan River in the city of Sheboygan Falls.

== Fishing ==
During the past decades, a number of initiatives have occurred to reclaim and restore the Onion River in hopes of encouraging natural trout populations to increase. The Onion River is the only Class I trout stream in southern Wisconsin, and its natural trout population severely decreased from the levels found during the mid-20th century. In 2008, the Wisconsin Department of Natural Resources reclassified all of the Onion River from County N upstream as a Class I trout stream, meaning that it contains naturally reproducing wild trout.

A Wisconsin Department of Natural Resources study showed that from 1997 through 2006, the natural trout population of this stretch of the Onion River has increased ten-fold due to these continued efforts. It is expected that this population will continue to increase as further efforts continue on this stretch. In 2011, the Lakeshore Chapter of Trout Unlimited, the Wisconsin Department of Natural Resources and Michels Corp. installed lunker structures in six spots along the river, which are expected to minimize erosion and stabilize the habitat for the trout and other wildlife.

== See also ==
- List of rivers of Wisconsin

== Sources ==
- DeLorme Mapping Company (1989). Wisconsin: Atlas and Gazetter. Delorme Mapping Company. ISBN 978-0-89933-247-5.
- U.S. Geological Survey Geographic Names Information System: Onion River
- Dnnart.net
