= Whitman A. Barber =

American businessman and politician

Member of the Wisconsin State Assembly
- In office 1899

Personal details
- Born: Whitman Ashby Barber; October 17, 1853 Lyndon, Sheboygan County, Wisconsin, U.S.
- Died: February 23, 1930 (aged 76) Waldo, Wisconsin, U.S.
- Party: Republican
- Education: Ripon College
- Occupation: Politician, businessman

Whitman Ashby Barber (October 17, 1853 – February 23, 1930) was an American businessman and politician.

Born on a farm in the town of Lyndon, near Waldo, Sheboygan County, Wisconsin, Barber went to Ripon College, for one year, and then taught school in Silver Creek, Wisconsin. In 1874, Barber was appointed United States gauger. Barber worked for the Waldo Canning Company, as manager, and was president of the Twin Buttes Mining and Smelting Company. Barber served as chairman and assessor of the Town of Lyndon. In 1899, Barber served in the Wisconsin State Assembly and was a Republican. Barber died at his home in Waldo, Wisconsin.
