= Alvah R. Munger =

American farmer and politician

Alvah Romaine Munger (August 3, 1842 – November 26, 1928) was an American farmer and politician.

Born in Marseilles, Illinois, Munger moved to Milwaukee, Wisconsin Territory in 1846 and then settled in the town of Scott, Sheboygan County, Wisconsin in 1848. During the American Civil War, Munger served in the 27th Wisconsin Volunteer Infantry Regiment. Munger was a farmer. He served as the Scott town supervisor, served in other town offices, including justice of the peace, and was a Republican. In 1891, Munger served in the Wisconsin State Assembly. He died at his home in Waldo, Wisconsin.
