= Eugene A. Phalen =

American politician

Eugene A. Phalen (April 24, 1876 – August 23, 1940) was an American businessman and politician.

Born on a farm in the town of Lima, Sheboygan County, Wisconsin, Phalen moved to West Allis, Wisconsin in 1903 and was in the restaurant and theatre businesses. He served on the board of directors of the West Allis Industrial Loan Company and was president of the County Building and Loan Company. Phalen served on the West Allis common council and the school board. In 1929, Phalen served in the Wisconsin State Assembly and was a Republican. Phalen died at his home in West Allis, Wisconsin.
