= Liebenstein (disambiguation) =

Liebenstein may refer to:

- Liebenstein, village and a former municipality in the district Ilm-Kreis, in Thuringia, Germany

== People with the name ==
- Jakob von Liebenstein (1462–1508), Archbishop-Elector of Mainz
- John W. Liebenstein (1845–1924), American businessman and politician
- Kurt Freiherr von Liebenstein (1899–1975), German general during World War II
- Todd Liebenstein (born 1960), former American football defensive end
