= John W. Liebenstein =

American businessman and politician

John W. Liebenstein (December 28, 1845 – September 8, 1924) was an American businessman and politician. He was a member of the Wisconsin State Assembly.

== Biography ==
Born in what is now Baden, Germany, Liebenstein emigrated with his parents to the United States in 1847 and settled in what is now Milwaukee, Wisconsin. Eventually, he moved to Scott, Sheboygan County, Wisconsin.

During the American Civil War, Liebenstein enlisted in the 26th Wisconsin Volunteer Infantry Regiment and was a private. He attended Baldwin Wallace University for two years.

Liebenstein operated a sawmill and was in the insurance business. He served as chairman of the Scott Town Board. He also served on the school board and the Sheboygan County Board of Supervisors. In 1893, Liebenstein was in the Wisconsin State Assembly as a Democrat.

Liebenstein died at his home in Batavia, Wisconsin.
