= Orton Keyes =

American football player and coach (1895–1983)

Biographical details
- Born: February 14, 1895; Waldo, Wisconsin, U.S.
- Died: October 1, 1983 (aged 88)

Playing career
- 1916–1917: Wisconsin

Coaching career (HC unless noted)
- 1921–1926: Platteville Normal / State Teachers

Head coaching record
- Overall: 15–24–4

Orton F. Keyes (February 14, 1895 – October 1, 1983) was an American college football player and coach. He served as the head football coach at the University of Wisconsin–Platteville from 1921 to 1926, compiling a record of 15–24–4.
