= Gooseville Mill/Grist Mill =

- U.S. National Register of Historic Places
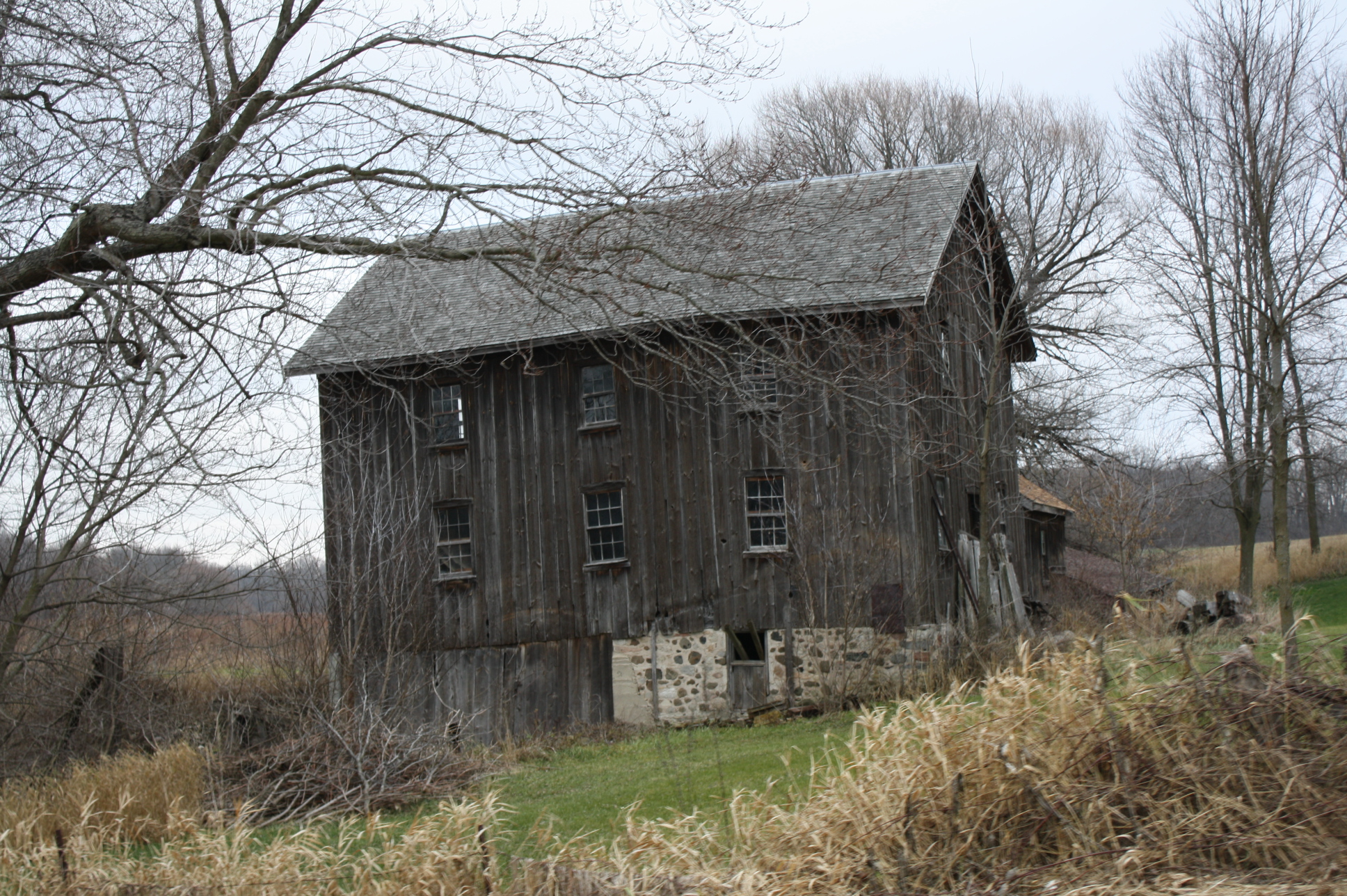
- The Gooseville Mill/Grist Mill from the side

- Location within Wisconsin Location within the United States
- Location: Silver Creek-Cascade Rd., Gooseville, Wisconsin
- Coordinates: 43°35′16″N 88°1′14″W
- Area: less than one acre
- Built: 1879
- MPS: 19th Century Grist and Flouring Mills of Sheboygan County TR
- NRHP reference No.: 84000673
- Added to NRHP: December 27, 1984

The Gooseville Mill/Grist Mill is a historic mill on the North Branch Milwaukee River in Gooseville, Wisconsin. The mill was built in 1879 to replace an 1855 mill that had burned down. The mill is a small custom mill with board and batten siding and is typical of the custom mills common in Sheboygan County in the 1800s. A Lefel turbine powered the mill, replacing the paddle wheel used in the 1855 mill. A burr mill was used to grind the grain processed at the mill. As of 1984, the mill was still operational and occasionally used as a sawmill.

The mill was added to the National Register of Historic Places in 1984.
