= Wilfrid J. Turba =

American politician

Wilfrid J. Turba (January 18, 1928 – August 18, 2005) was a member of the Wisconsin State Assembly.

== Biography ==
Turba was born on January 18, 1928, in Russell, Sheboygan County, Wisconsin. He was the valedictorian of the 1945 graduating class of New Holstein High School. Turba then attended the University of Wisconsin–Madison. Turba was a dairy and grain farmer. Later, he became a lector and choir member of St. Ann's Roman Catholic Church in St. Anna, Wisconsin.

On May 2, 1950, Turba married Leona Boll. They would have nine children together. Leona died on December 28, 1995. On December 30, 1996, he married Mary Jane Fellenz-Brunmeier, a mother of two. Turba died on August 18, 2005, in Elkhart Lake, Wisconsin.

== Political career ==
Turba was a member of the Assembly from 1982 to 1992. Additionally, he served as President of the New Holstein, Wisconsin School Board. He was a Republican.
