= Gooseville, Wisconsin =

- Unincorporated community
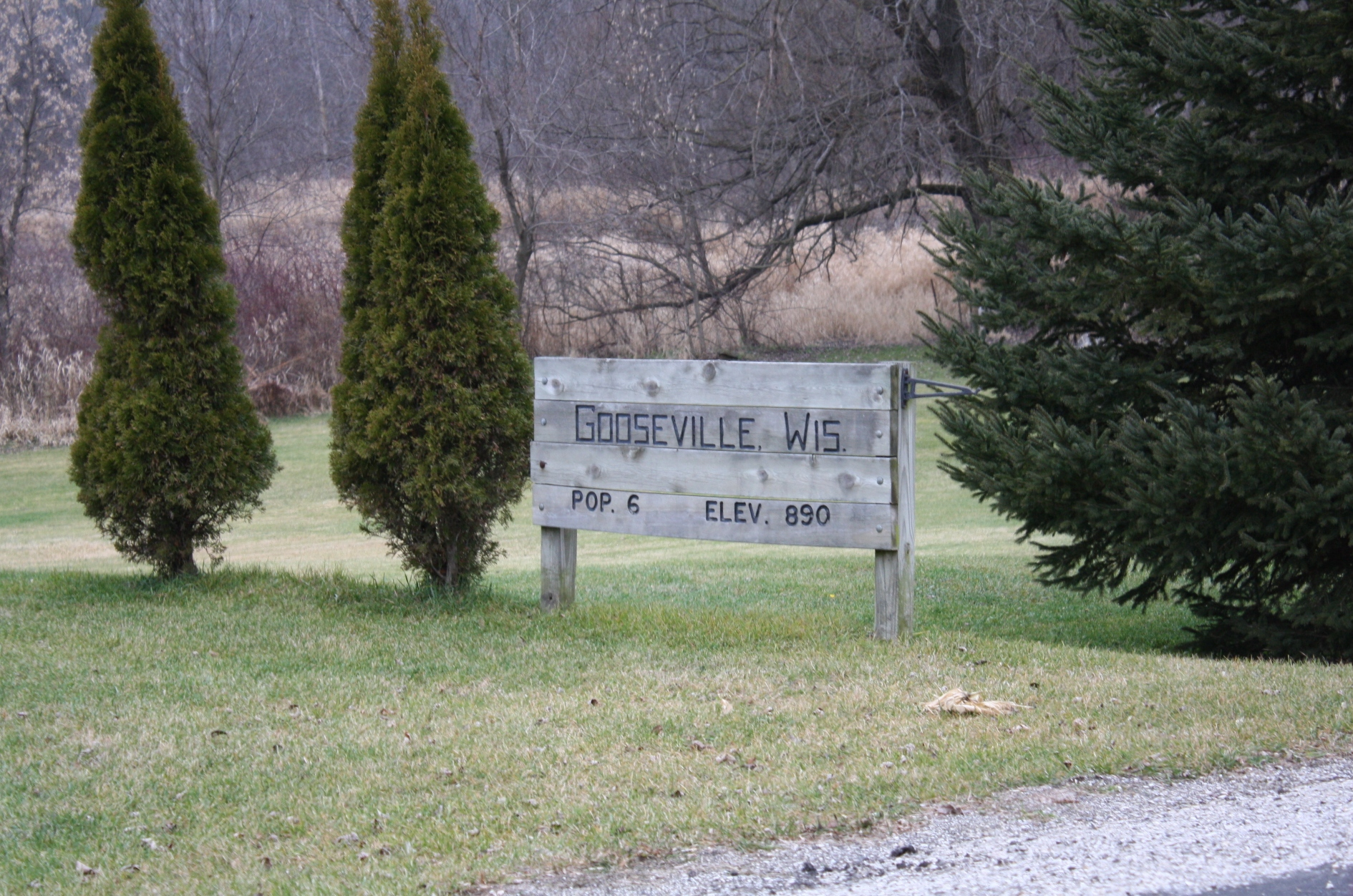

- Location within Wisconsin Location within the United States
- Coordinates: 43°35′14″N 88°01′16″W
- Country: United States
- State: Wisconsin
- County: Sheboygan
- Elevation: 833 ft (254 m)
- Time zone: UTC-6 (Central (CST))
  - Summer (DST): UTC-5 (CDT)
- Area code: 920
- GNIS feature ID: 1577618

Gooseville is an unincorporated community located in the town of Sherman, in Sheboygan County, Wisconsin, United States.

== Historical landmark ==
- The Gooseville Mill/Grist Mill is listed on the National Register of Historic Places.

== Images ==
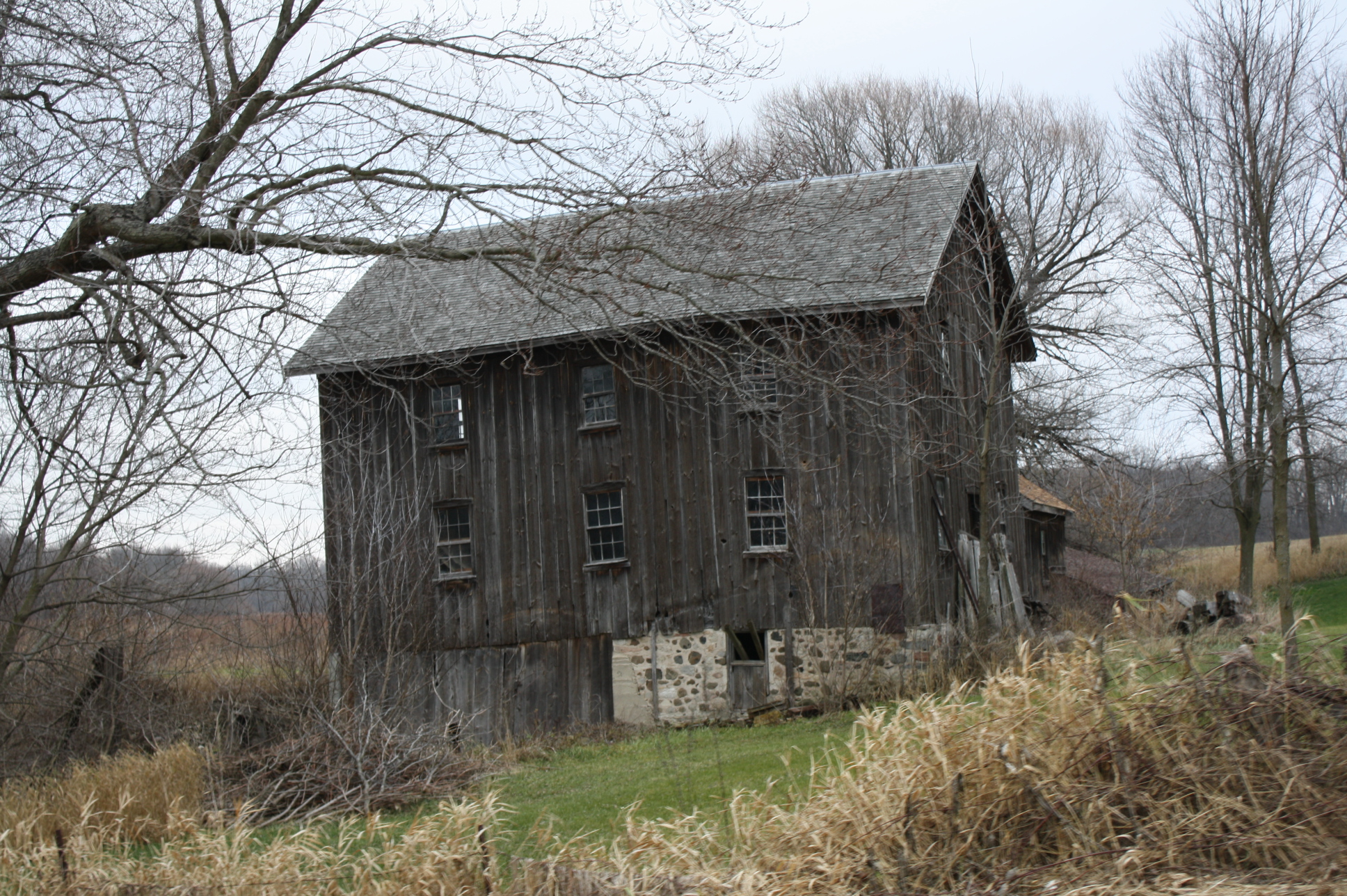
Gooseville Mill/Grist Mill, listed on the National Register of Historic Places

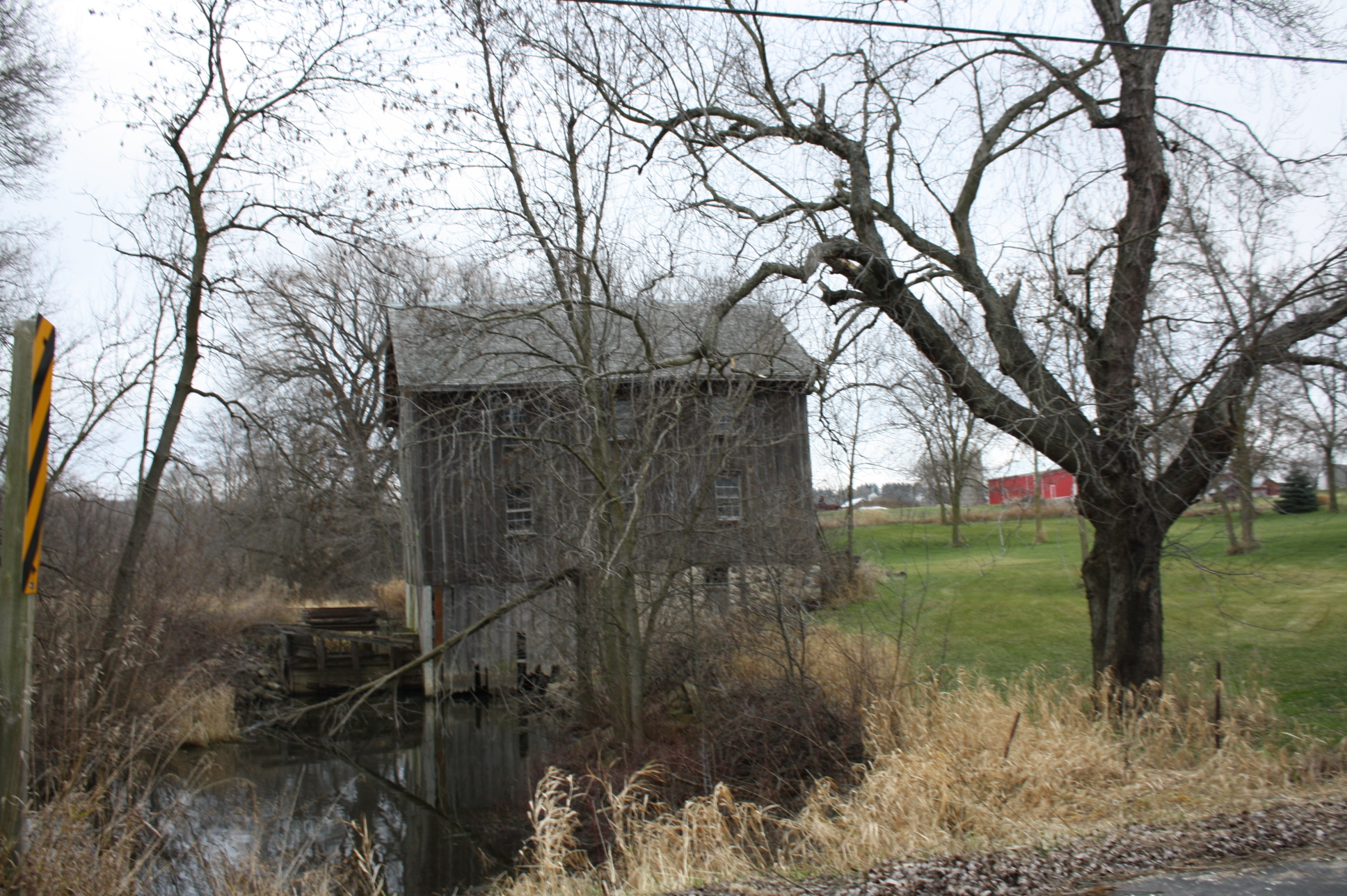
Gooseville Grist Mill
