= St. Anna, Wisconsin =

- Unincorporated community
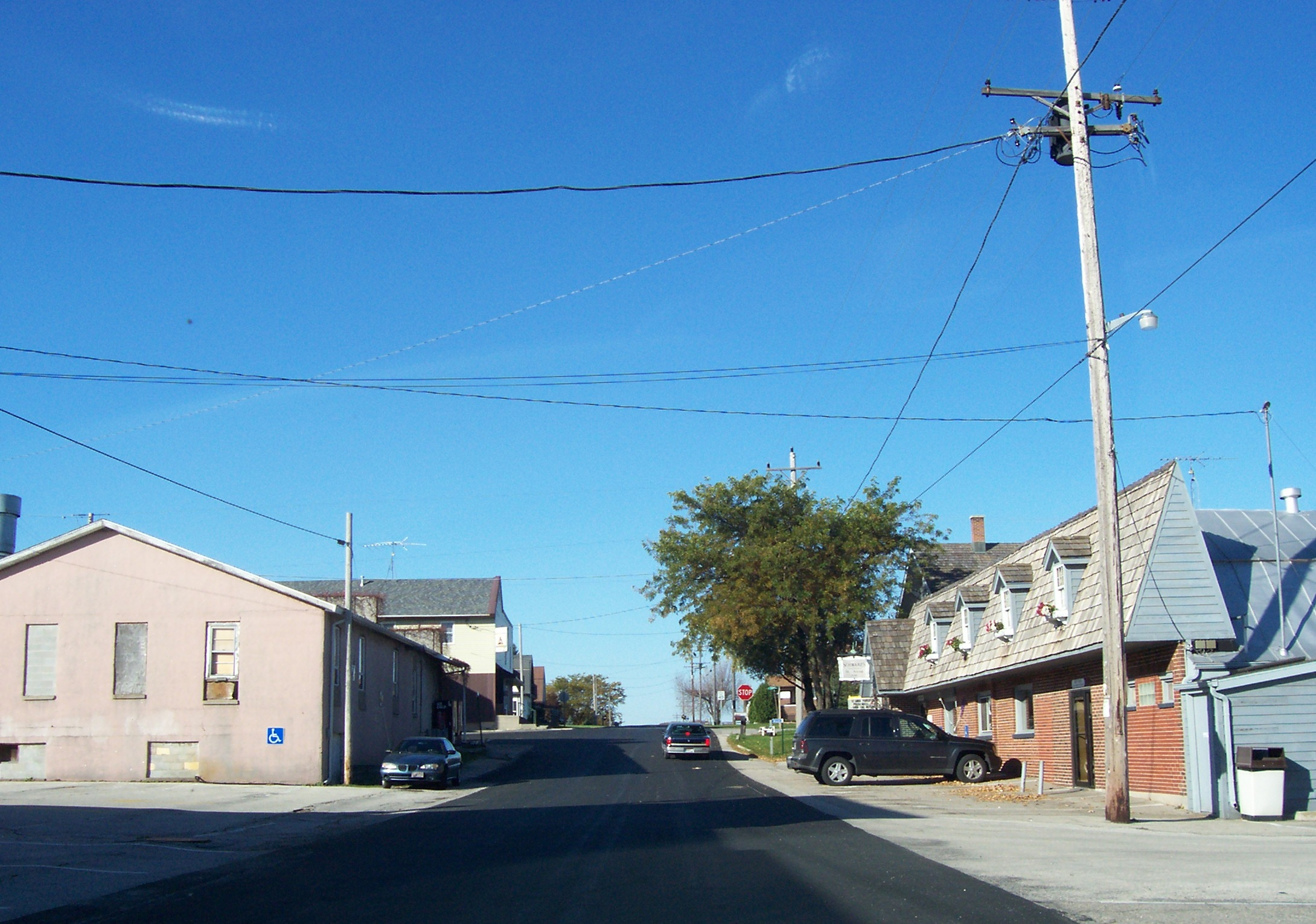
- Looking west at downtown St. Anna

- Location within Wisconsin Location within the United States
- Coordinates: 43°53′36″N 88°07′17″W
- Country: United States
- State: Wisconsin
- County: Calumet, Sheboygan
- Elevation: 958 ft (292 m)
- Time zone: UTC-6 (Central (CST))
  - Summer (DST): UTC-5 (CDT)
- Area code: 920
- GNIS feature ID: 1572832

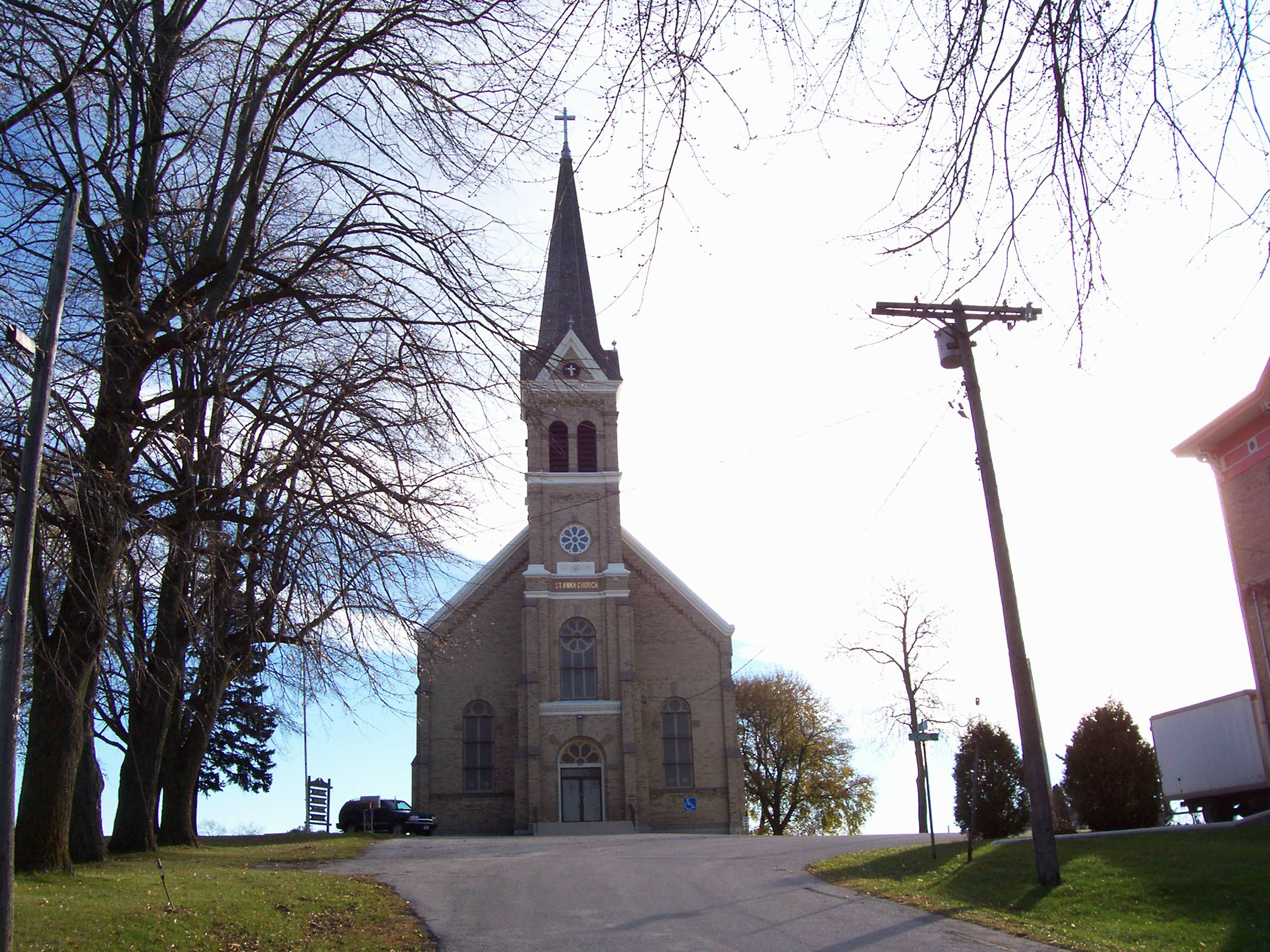
St. Ann's Roman Catholic Church

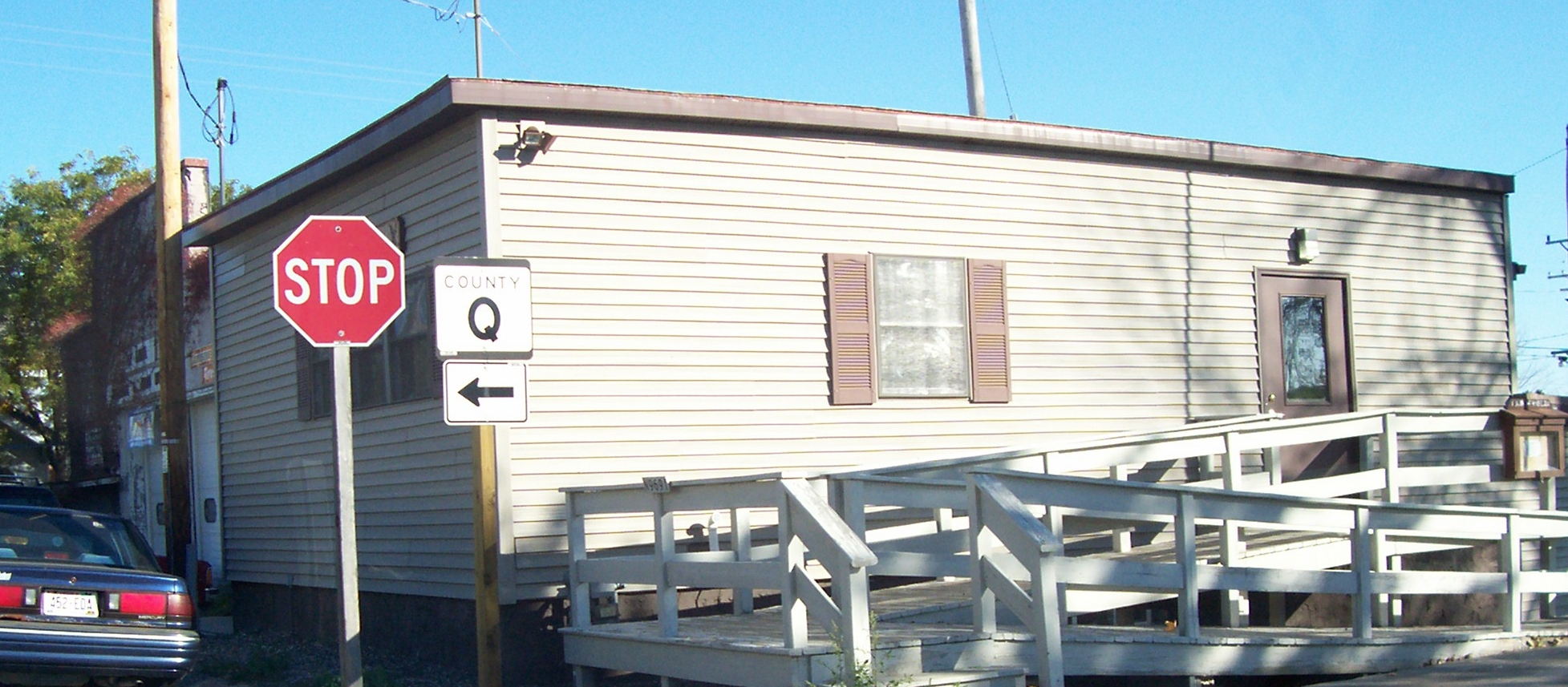
Russell town hall in St. Anna

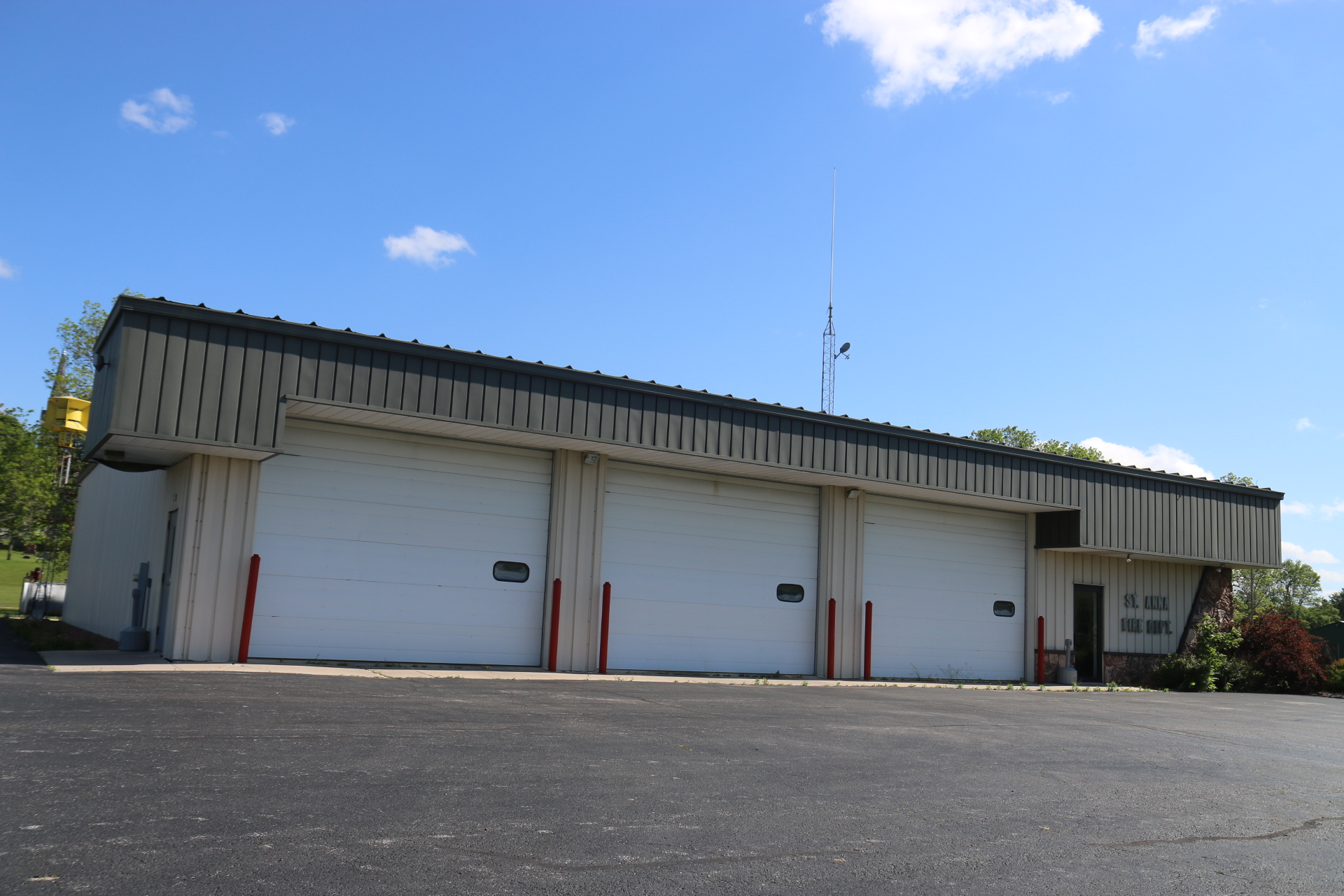
St. Anna Fire Department

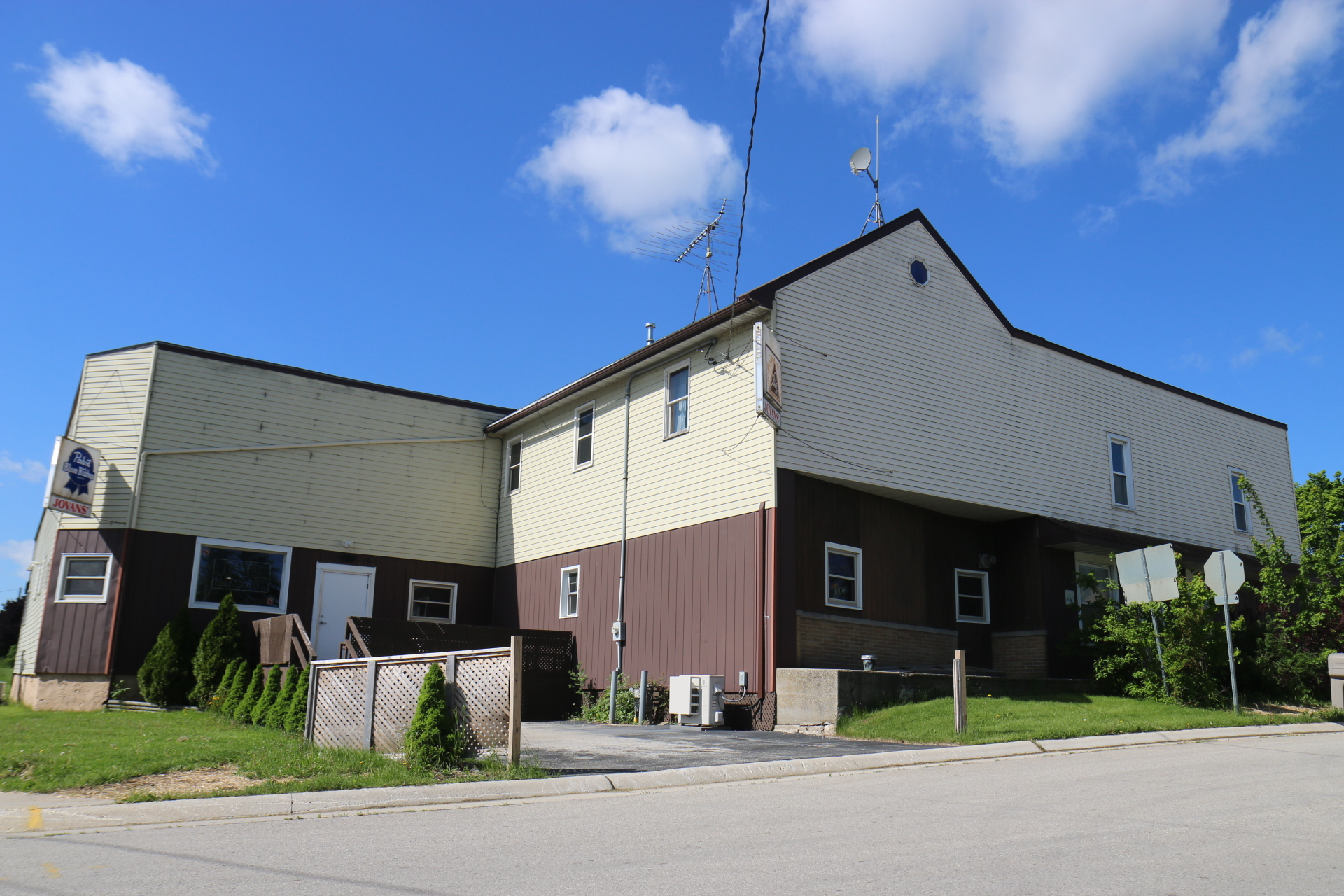
The former post office building

St. Anna is an unincorporated community in Calumet and Sheboygan Counties in the U.S. state of Wisconsin. It lies in the towns of Russell and New Holstein.

== History ==
St. Anna priest Rev. John Haen described the St. Anna area prior to European emigrants: "The land at the coming of the early settlers in this vicinity was covered with dense forests which had not been touched by woodmen's axe. The soil was rich and fertile for no plowshare had entered. The woods were teeming with deer and other wild animals hunted only by the Brothertown Indians who inhabited this region."

In 1835 a wave of at least 20 luxembourgish immigrants settled in St. Anna.

In 1848, 70 emigrants from Hamburg, Germany, settled in the New Holstein area, forming the basis of what would become the present city of New Holstein. St. Anna's development began in the fall of 1848 when some of these German Roman Catholics built a log church. The church had added a school by 1878. By 1881, St. Anna consisted of a wooden shoe factory, several general stores, and two hotels. The Chilton Times-Journal said that St. Anna was "once the center of the wooden shoe industry in Wisconsin." The cornerstone for the community's new brick block church was laid on November 4, 1895, and the structure was still used as of 2014. St. Anna had a post office as of 1876.

== Holyland ==
St. Anna is located at the edge of an area in eastern Fond du Lac County known as "The Holyland", so called because of the large number of communities built around churches, including St. Peter, St. Cloud, Marytown, Mount Calvary, Johnsburg, Calvary, Brothertown and Jericho.

A recognizable feature in St. Anna is the Roman Catholic St. Ann's Church, located at the peak of the largest hill in the area. St. Ann Parish is in the Roman Catholic Diocese of Green Bay.

== Transportation ==
St. Anna is located at the intersection of Calumet County highways A and Q, and Sheboygan County H. Wisconsin Highway 149 formed the backbone into the area before it was decommissioned in 2006. It was located less than one mile (1.609344 km) north of St. Anna.

== Notable people ==
- Lois Thome, meteorologist, WINK-TV
- Wilfrid J. Turba, politician, lived in St. Anna
