= Lima, Sheboygan County, Wisconsin =

Lima, Wisconsin
- Town
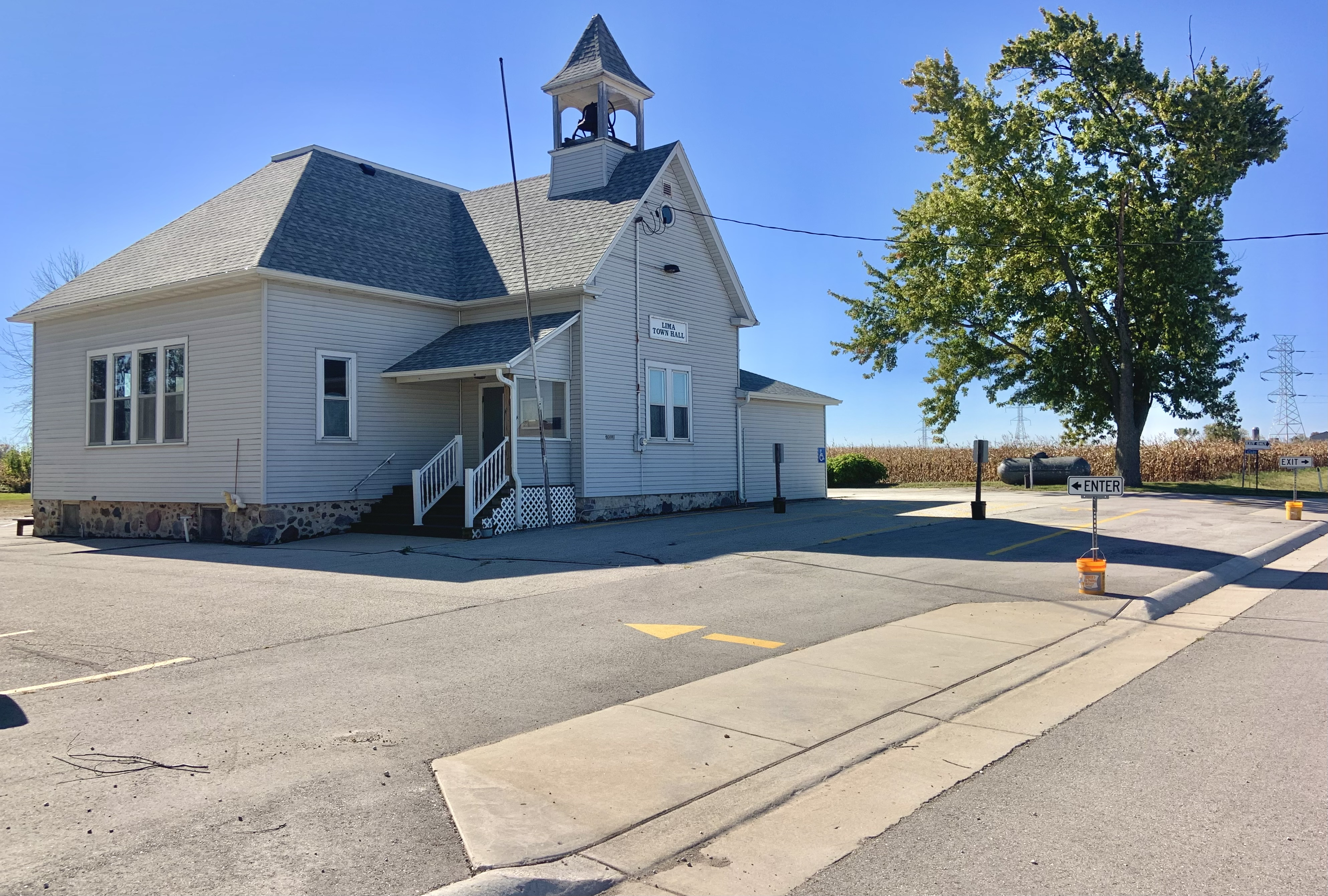
- Town hall

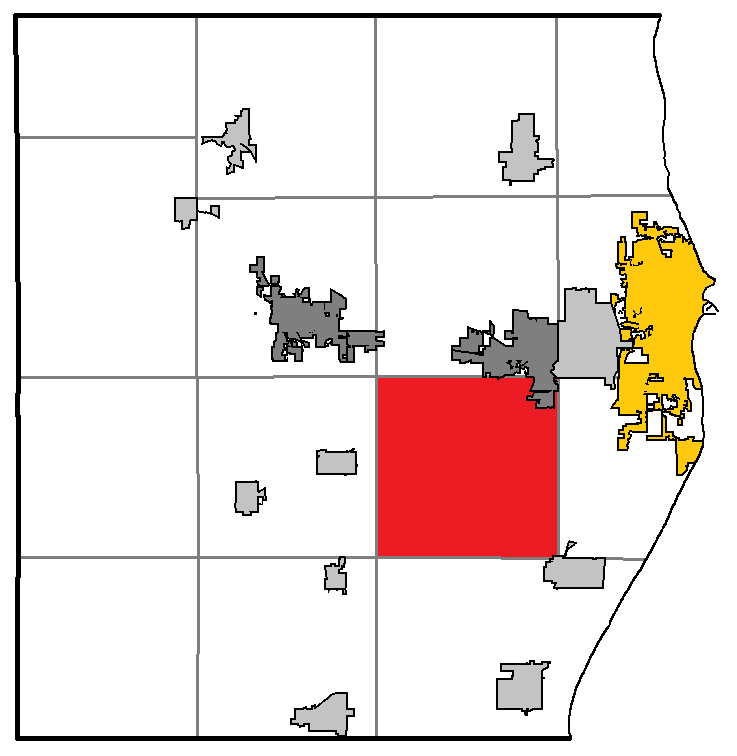
- Location of Lima, within Sheboygan County
- Coordinates: 43°40′7″N 87°51′44″W
- Country: United States
- State: Wisconsin
- County: Sheboygan

Area
  - Total: 36.6 sq mi (94.9 km^{2})
  - Land: 36.6 sq mi (94.7 km^{2})
  - Water: 0.077 sq mi (0.2 km^{2})
- Elevation: 738 ft (225 m)

Population (2020)
  - Total: 2,956
  - Density: 80.8/sq mi (31.2/km^{2})
- Time zone: UTC-6 (Central (CST))
  - Summer (DST): UTC-5 (CDT)
- Area code: 920
- FIPS code: 55-44150
- GNIS feature ID: 1583558
- Website: www.townlima.com

Lima (/ˈlaɪmə/) is a town in Sheboygan County, Wisconsin, United States. The population was 2,956 at the 2020 census. It is included in the Sheboygan, Wisconsin Metropolitan Statistical Area. The unincorporated communities of Gibbsville, Hingham, and Ourtown are located in the town. The ghost town of Kennedy Corners was also located in the town.

== Geography ==
According to the United States Census Bureau, the town has a total area of 36.6 square miles (94.9 km^{2}), of which 36.6 square miles (94.7 km^{2}) is land and 0.1 square miles (0.2 km^{2}) (0.16%) is water.

== Demographics ==
As of the census of 2000, there were 2,948 people, 1,008 households, and 828 families residing in the town. The population density was 80.6 people per square mile (31.1/km^{2}). There were 1,029 housing units at an average density of 28.1 per square mile (10.9/km^{2}). The racial makeup of the town was 98.68% White, 0.14% African American, 0.10% Native American, 0.41% Asian, 0.27% from other races, and 0.41% from two or more races. Hispanic or Latino of any race were 0.92% of the population.

There were 1,008 households, out of which 36.1% had children under the age of 18 living with them, 77.3% were married couples living together, 3.2% had a female householder with no husband present, and 17.8% were non-families. 13.6% of all households were made up of individuals, and 5.7% had someone living alone who was 65 years of age or older. The average household size was 2.81 and the average family size was 3.12.

In the town, the population was spread out, with 25.8% under the age of 18, 6.4% from 18 to 24, 28.6% from 25 to 44, 26.4% from 45 to 64, and 12.7% who were 65 years of age or older. The median age was 39 years. For every 100 females, there were 103.2 males. For every 100 females age 18 and over, there were 102.0 males.

The median income for a household in the town was $53,023, and the median income for a family was $56,917. Males had a median income of $36,975 versus $26,154 for females. The per capita income for the town was $21,175. None of the families and 0.5% of the population were living below the poverty line, including no under eighteens and 1.3% of those over 64.

== Notable people ==
- Harold F. Huibregtse, Wisconsin businessman and state legislator, was born in Lima
- Frank W. Humphrey, Wisconsin banker and state legislator, was born in Lima
- Dennis T. Phalen, Wisconsin lawyer and state legislator, was born in Lima
- Eugene A. Phalen, Wisconsin businessman and state legislator, was born in Lima
