= Frank W. Humphrey =

American politician

Frank Wesley Humphrey (1851–1931) was a member of the Wisconsin State Assembly.

== Biography ==
Humphrey was born on November 7, 1851, in Lima, Sheboygan County, Wisconsin. In 1881, Humphrey graduated from Lawrence University. He settled in Shawano, Wisconsin, the following year, where he became a banker. He died there on July 15, 1931.

== Assembly career ==
Humphrey was a Republican member of the Assembly during the 1899 session.
