= Hingham, Wisconsin =

Census-designated place in Wisconsin, United States

- Census-designated place
- Location within Wisconsin
- Coordinates: 43°38′20″N 87°54′51″W
- Country: United States
- State: Wisconsin
- County: Sheboygan

Area
  - Total: 2.786 sq mi (7.22 km^{2})
  - Land: 2.695 sq mi (6.98 km^{2})
  - Water: 0.091 sq mi (0.24 km^{2})
- Elevation: 804 ft (245 m)

Population (2020 census)
  - Total: 899
  - Density: 334/sq mi (129/km^{2})
- Time zone: UTC-6 (Central (CST))
  - Summer (DST): UTC-5 (CDT)
- ZIP code: 53031
- Area code: 920
- GNIS feature ID: 1566481

Hingham is an unincorporated census-designated place located in the town of Lima, in Sheboygan County, Wisconsin, United States, northeast of Adell and southeast of Waldo. It has a post office with ZIP code 53031. As of the 2010 census, its population was 886. The CDP's population rose to 899 at the 2020 census.

== History ==
Hingham was platted on September 5, 1850, by Edward Hobart. The land was acquired from Mrs. David Giddings, who had bought it from the U.S. government in 1846. Streets on the original plat included Water, Center, Spring, South and Main. It was named after Hingham, Massachusetts.
