= J. C. Hoffman =

American politician

J. C. Hoffman was a member of the Wisconsin State Assembly.

== Biography ==
Hoffman was born on July 3, 1856, in Waldo, Wisconsin. On June 1, 1879, he married Martha F. Edgerly. They would have four children before her death on July 3, 1914. Hoffman died on November 15, 1938, in Medford, Wisconsin, and was buried there.

== Career ==
Hoffman was elected to the Assembly in 1924. Other positions he held include Chairman (similar to Mayor) of Browning, Wisconsin, and a member of the Taylor County, Wisconsin Board of Supervisors. He was a Republican.
