= Waldo, Wisconsin =

- Village
- Location of Waldo in Sheboygan County, Wisconsin.
- Coordinates: 43°40′32″N 87°56′48″W
- Country: United States
- State: Wisconsin
- County: Sheboygan

Area
  - Total: 1.02 sq mi (2.63 km^{2})
  - Land: 0.97 sq mi (2.52 km^{2})
  - Water: 0.042 sq mi (0.11 km^{2})
- Elevation: 856 ft (261 m)

Population (2020)
  - Total: 467
  - Density: 480/sq mi (185/km^{2})
- Time zone: UTC-6 (Central (CST))
  - Summer (DST): UTC-5 (CDT)
- ZIP code: 53093
- Area code: 920
- FIPS code: 55-83100
- GNIS feature ID: 1576152
- Website: villageofwaldo.com

Waldo is a village along the Onion River in Sheboygan County, Wisconsin, United States. The population was 467 at the 2020 census. It has a post office with ZIP code 53093 and is included in the Sheboygan, Wisconsin Metropolitan Statistical Area.

== History ==
The village was originally established as Lyndon Station (named for the town it resides in) when the Milwaukee and Northern Railway Company laid their tracks through in 1871. Starting in Milwaukee by 1873 the line had reached Green Bay, Wi. On June 20, 1890, the line was acquired by the Milwaukee Road (Chicago, Milwaukee, St Paul and Pacific Railroad) operating as the Green Bay Sub. The section between Milwaukee and Plymouth, Wi is currently operated by the Wisconsin and Southern Railroad and is used as a secondary freight only line serving local industry, as the Plymouth Sub.

The village was plated in 1873 by N.C. Harmon on 80 acres of land that he and his son-in-law Eugene McIntyre had purchased from Abraham Lawson. When it was discovered that there already was an existing Lyndon Station in Juneau County, it was decided to rename the village after Otis Harvey Waldo, a prominent Milwaukee attorney and then president of the railroad.

In 1877 the Post Office (Est. 1849) for the Onion River settlement (Est. 1844), one mile (1.6 km) east was closed. In 1923 Waldo became an incorporated village and Onion River ceased to exist. The open area between has since been built up.

The Onion River Dam, a Saw Mill and a Grist Mill had been built at this location on the Onion River in 1856. The Waldo Mill Pond has a normal surface area of 40 acres (160,000 m^{2}), currently used only for recreational purposes. The Onion River Dam is a gravity dam, of earthen construction, rock fill, originally completed in 1856. Its height is 15 feet (4.6 m) with a length of 300 feet (91 m). Maximum discharge is 1,165 cubic feet per second (33.0 m^{3}/s). Its capacity is 200 acres (0.81 km^{2}) feet. Normal storage is 100 acres (0.40 km^{2}) feet. It drains an area of 22 square miles (57 km^{2}). The dam and the related mill pond property are now owned by the village of Waldo.

The Waldo Cemetery in the northeast corner of the village is one of the oldest in the county, established in 1854. The former Waldo High School building still stands on the highest point in the village, built in 1904 and expanded in 1957. The Waldo School District was incorporated into the nearby Sheboygan Falls School District by vote in 1962.

== Geography ==
Waldo is located at 43°40′32″N 87°56′48″W (43.675585, -87.946636).

According to the United States Census Bureau, the village has a total area of 0.98 square miles (2.54 km^{2}), of which 0.94 square miles (2.43 km^{2}) is land and 0.04 square miles (0.10 km^{2}) is water.

== Demographics ==
Historical population
Census	Pop.	Note	%±
1880	110		—
1930	315		—
1940	324		2.9%
1950	367		13.3%
1960	403		9.8%
1970	408		1.2%
1980	416		2.0%
1990	442		6.3%
2000	450		1.8%
2010	503		11.8%
2020	467		−7.2%
U.S. Decennial Census

=== 2010 census ===
As of the census of 2010, there were 503 people, 197 households, and 135 families living in the village. The population density was 535.1 inhabitants per square mile (206.6/km^{2}). There were 209 housing units at an average density of 222.3 per square mile (85.8/km^{2}). The racial makeup of the village was 92.4% White, 1.4% African American, 0.8% Native American, 2.2% Asian, 1.2% from other races, and 2.0% from two or more races. Hispanic or Latino of any race were 2.4% of the population.

There were 197 households, of which 32.0% had children under the age of 18 living with them, 54.8% were married couples living together, 9.6% had a female householder with no husband present, 4.1% had a male householder with no wife present, and 31.5% were non-families. 24.4% of all households were made up of individuals, and 8.1% had someone living alone who was 65 years of age or older. The average household size was 2.55 and the average family size was 2.99.

The median age in the village was 37.9 years. 24.7% of residents were under the age of 18; 6.5% were between the ages of 18 and 24; 27.6% were from 25 to 44; 28.2% were from 45 to 64; and 13.3% were 65 years of age or older. The gender makeup of the village was 51.1% male and 48.9% female.

=== 2000 census ===
As of the census of 2000, there were 450 people, 169 households, and 123 families living in the village. The population density was 529.5 people per square mile (204.4/km^{2}). There were 174 housing units at an average density of 204.7 per square mile (79.0/km^{2}). The racial makeup of the village was 97.56% White, 1.33% Asian, and 1.11% from two or more races.

There were 169 households, out of which 32.0% had children under the age of 18 living with them, 59.2% were married couples living together, 7.7% had a female householder with no husband present, and 27.2% were non-families. 22.5% of all households were made up of individuals, and 7.1% had someone living alone who was 65 years of age or older. The average household size was 2.66 and the average family size was 3.14.

In the village, the population was spread out, with 26.9% under the age of 18, 6.9% from 18 to 24, 34.7% from 25 to 44, 21.3% from 45 to 64, and 10.2% who were 65 years of age or older. The median age was 35 years. For every 100 females, there were 97.4 males. For every 100 females age 18 and over, there were 100.6 males.

The median income for a household in the village was $48,125, and the median income for a family was $50,909. Males had a median income of $35,089 versus $25,625 for females. The per capita income for the village was $22,618. About 0.8% of families and 1.5% of the population were below the poverty line, including 1.7% of those under age 18 and none of those age 65 or over.

== Notable people ==
- Whitman A. Barber, Wisconsin State Representative, lived in Waldo.
- J. C. Hoffman, Wisconsin State Representative, was born in Waldo.
- Eugene McIntyre, Wisconsin State Representative, lived in Waldo.
- Alvah R. Munger, Wisconsin State Representative, lived in Waldo.
- George Pollard, American portrait painter, was born in Waldo.
- Henry W. Timmer, Wisconsin State Representative, lived in Waldo.

== Images ==
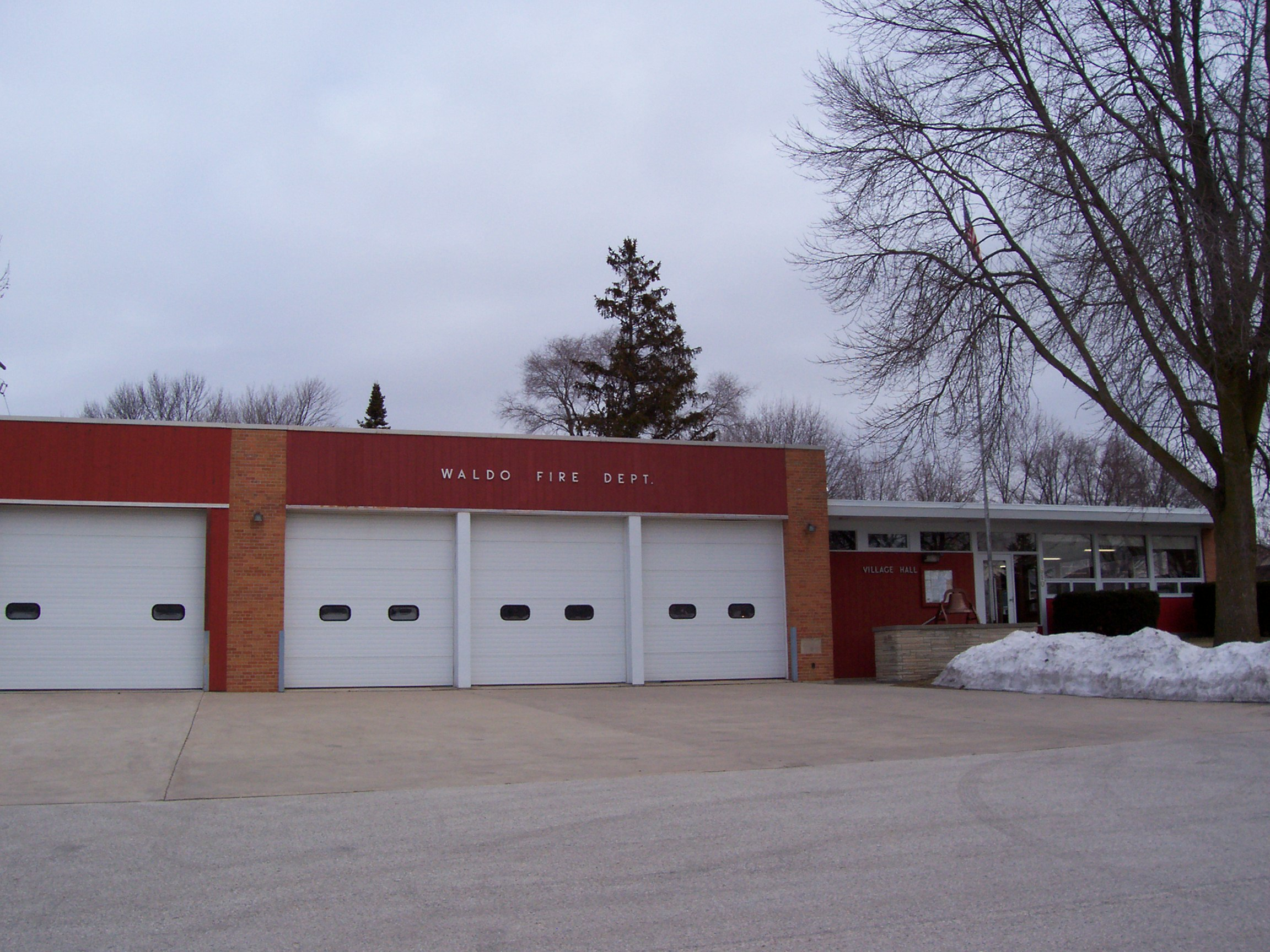
Waldo Fire Department

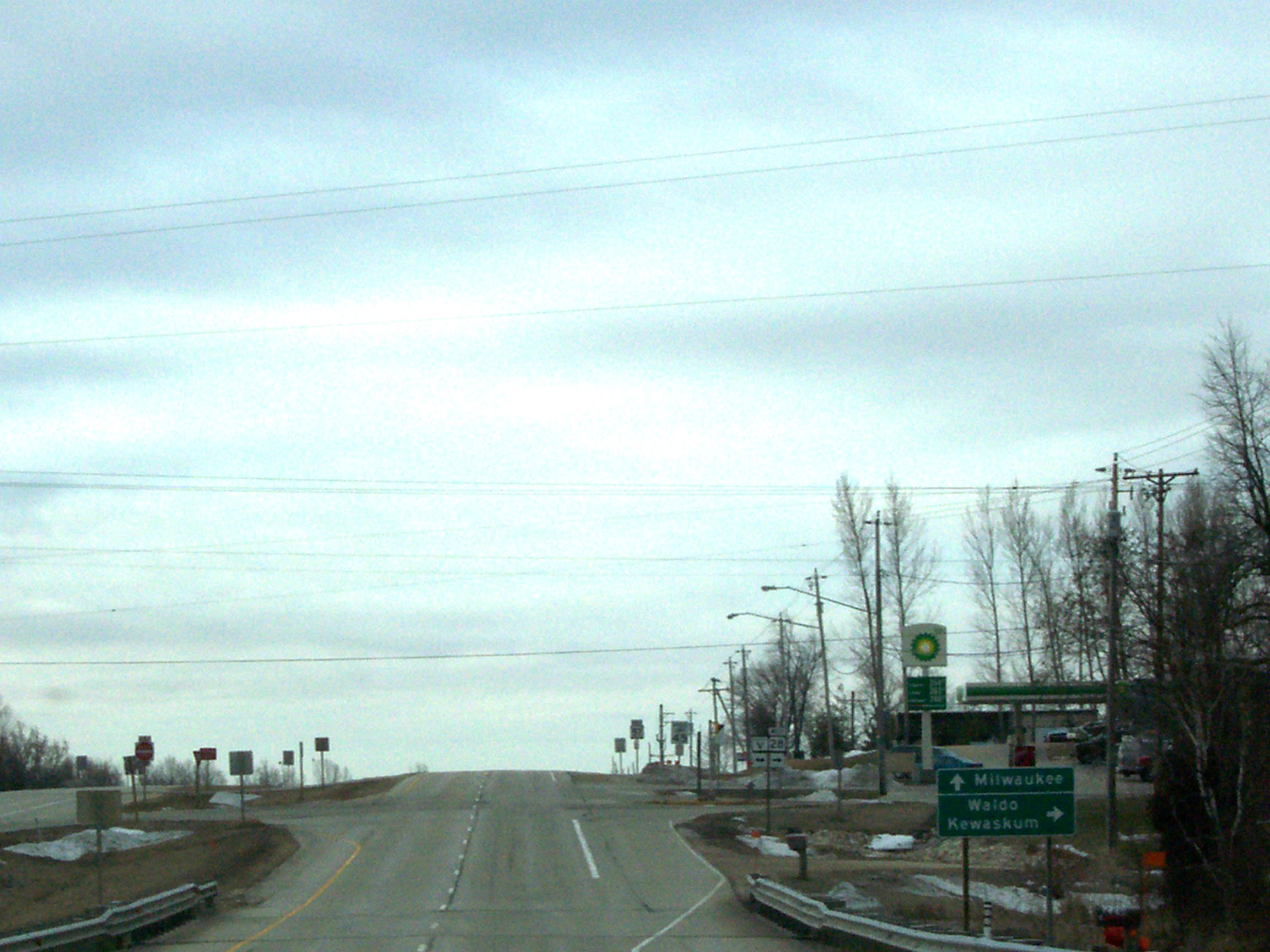
Intersection of Wisconsin Highways 57 and 28.

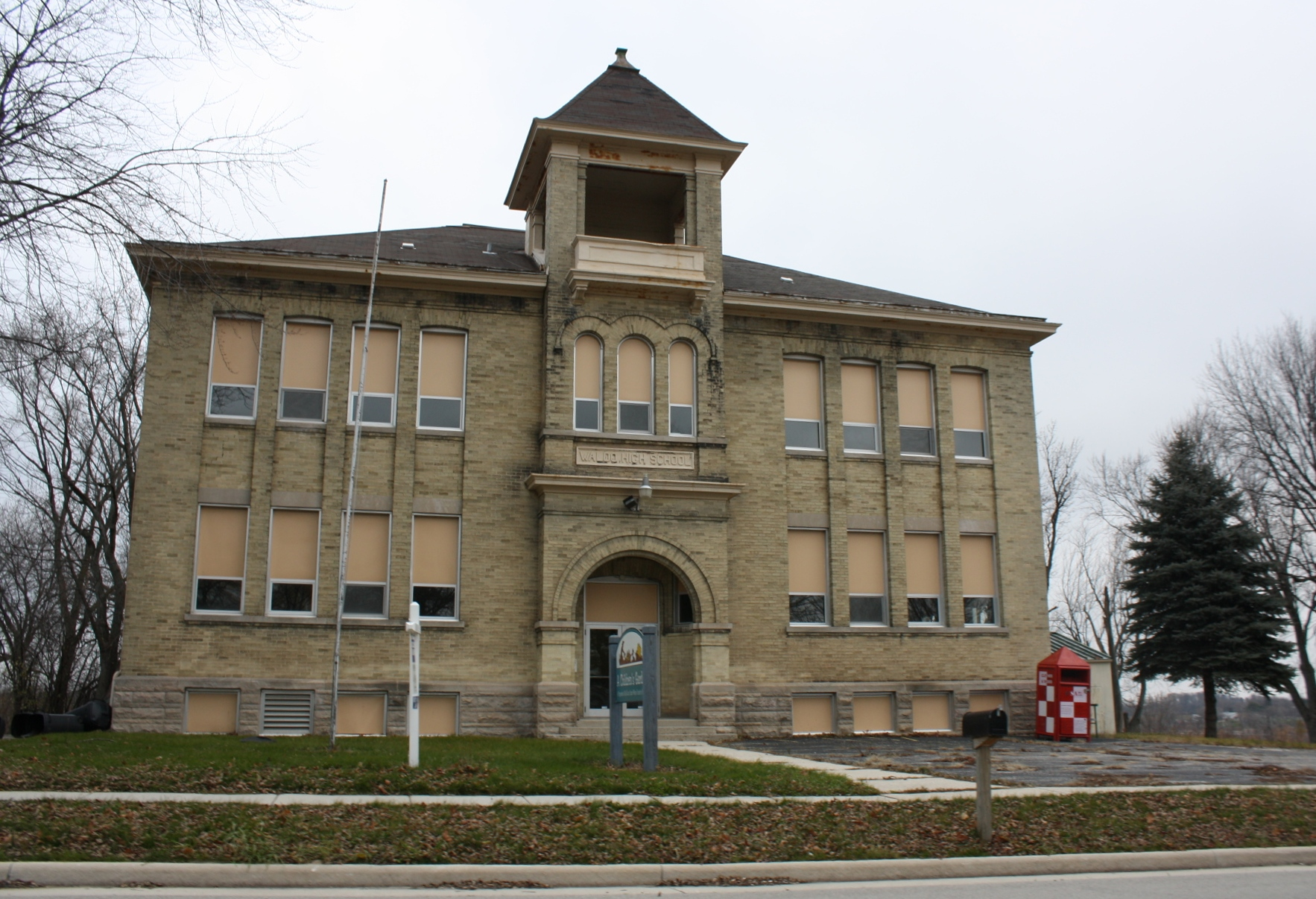
Former high school

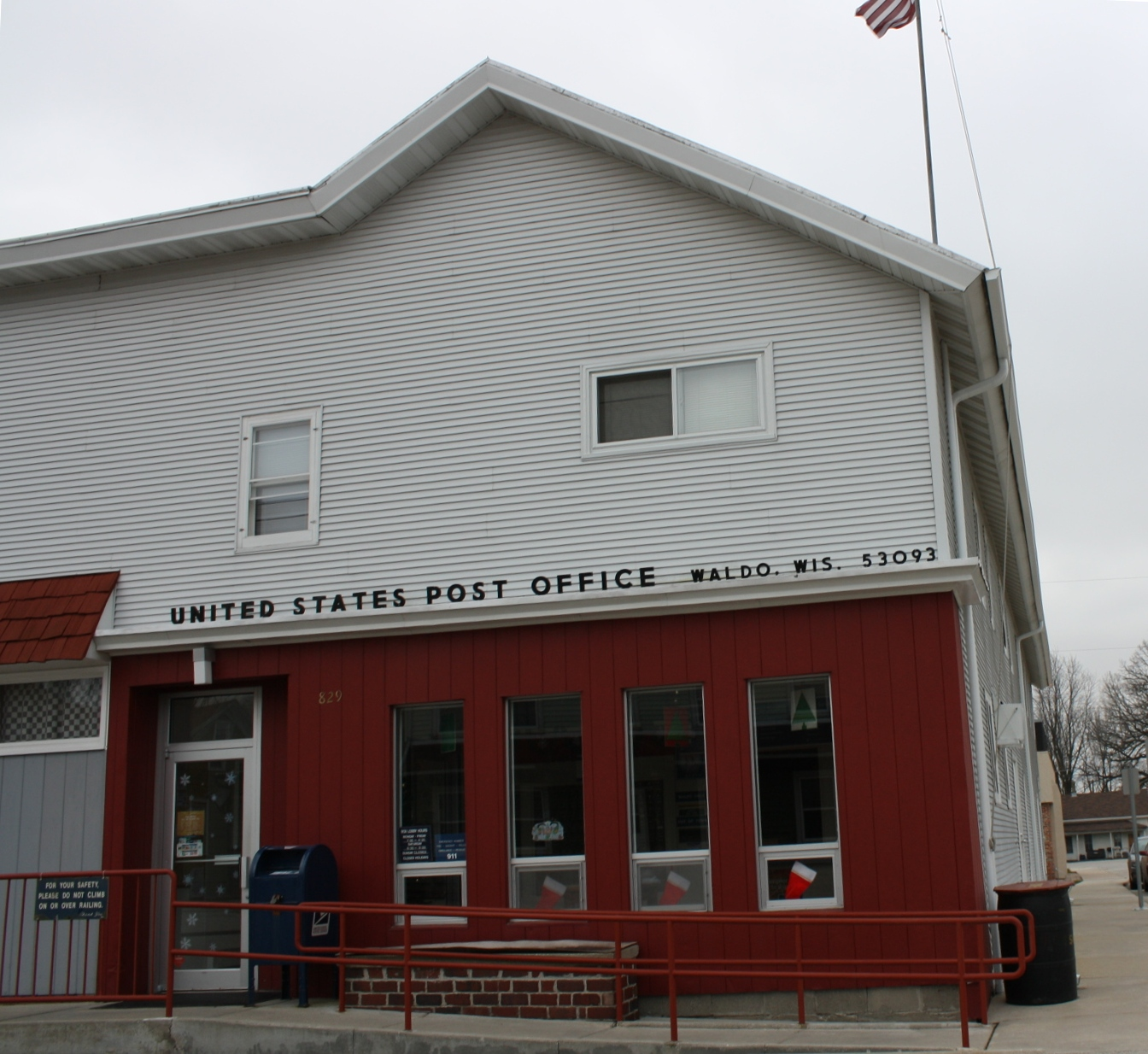
Post office

== See also ==
- List of villages in Wisconsin
