= Scott, Sheboygan County, Wisconsin =

Scott, Wisconsin
- Town
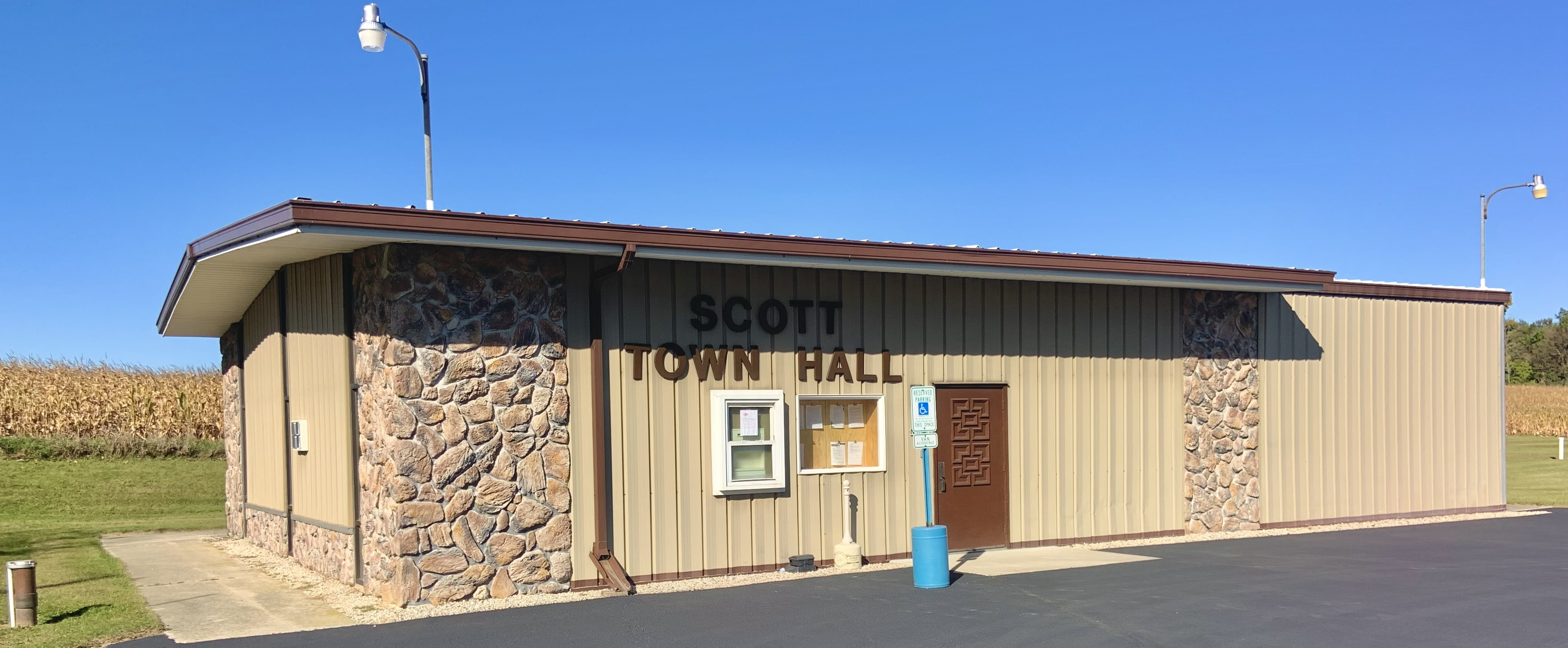
- Town hall

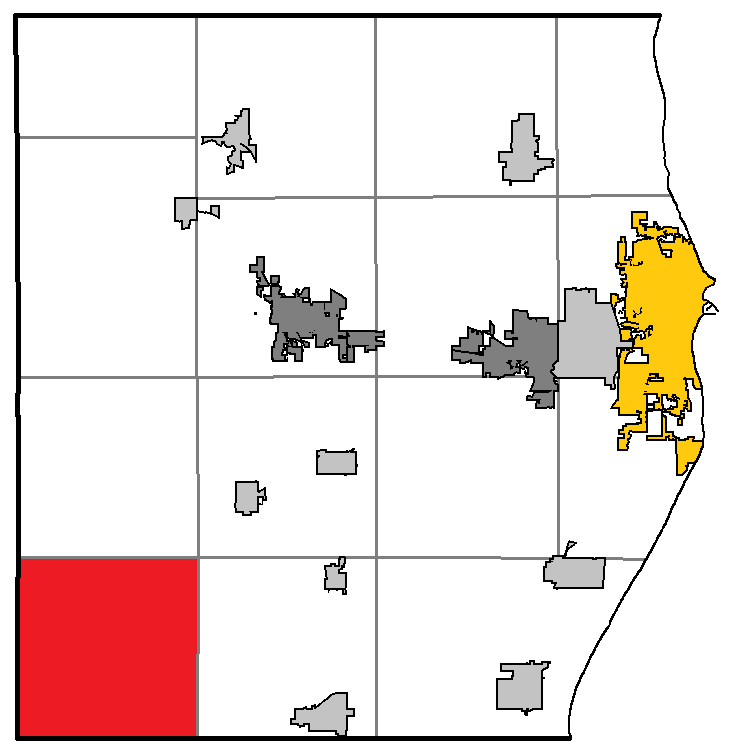
- Location of Scott, within Sheboygan County
- Coordinates: 43°34′43″N 88°5′43″W
- Country: United States
- State: Wisconsin
- County: Sheboygan

Area
  - Total: 36.5 sq mi (94.6 km^{2})
  - Land: 36.2 sq mi (93.7 km^{2})
  - Water: 0.35 sq mi (0.9 km^{2})
- Elevation: 968 ft (295 m)

Population (2020)
  - Total: 1,764
  - Density: 48.8/sq mi (18.8/km^{2})
- Time zone: UTC-6 (Central (CST))
  - Summer (DST): UTC-5 (CDT)
- Area code: 920
- FIPS code: 55-72350
- GNIS feature ID: 1584119
- Website: https://townofscottsheboyganwi.gov/

Scott is a town in Sheboygan County, Wisconsin, United States. The population was 1,764 at the 2020 census. The unincorporated communities of Batavia, Beechwood, and Cranberry Marsh are located within the town. It is included in the Sheboygan, Wisconsin Metropolitan Statistical Area.

== Geography ==
According to the United States Census Bureau, the town has a total area of 36.5 square miles (94.6 km^{2}), of which 36.2 square miles (93.7 km^{2}) is land and 0.4 square miles (1.0 km^{2}) (1.01%) is water.

== Demographics ==
As of the census of 2000, there were 1,804 people, 658 households, and 527 families residing in the town. The population density was 49.9 people per square mile (19.3/km^{2}). There were 700 housing units at an average density of 19.4 per square mile (7.5/km^{2}). The racial makeup of the town was 98.00% White, 0.06% African American, 0.28% Native American, 0.61% Asian, and 1.05% from two or more races. Hispanic or Latino of any race were 0.89% of the population.

There were 658 households, out of which 36.8% had children under the age of 18 living with them, 69.3% were married couples living together, 4.6% had a female householder with no husband present, and 19.9% were non-families. 15.8% of all households were made up of individuals, and 6.8% had someone living alone who was 65 years of age or older. The average household size was 2.74 and the average family size was 3.07.

In the town, the population was spread out, with 27.5% under the age of 18, 6.7% from 18 to 24, 30.2% from 25 to 44, 24.4% from 45 to 64, and 11.2% who were 65 years of age or older. The median age was 37 years. For every 100 females, there were 107.6 males. For every 100 females age 18 and over, there were 112.0 males.

The median income for a household in the town was $51,771, and the median income for a family was $54,598. Males had a median income of $40,111 versus $26,250 for females. The per capita income for the town was $20,160. About 1.5% of families and 3.1% of the population were below the poverty line, including 2.9% of those under age 18 and 5.1% of those age 65 or over.

== Notable people ==
- George W. Koch, Wisconsin State Representative, farmer, businessman, lived in the town. Koch was chairman of the Scott Town Board
- John W. Liebenstein, Wisconsin State Representative, businessman, lived in the town
- Alvah R. Munger, Wisconsin State Representative, farmer, lived in the town
- John Ruch, Wisconsin State Representative, farmer and sawmill owner, lived in the town. Ruch held various local offices

== See also ==
- List of towns in Wisconsin
