= Russell, Sheboygan County, Wisconsin =

Russell, Wisconsin
- Town
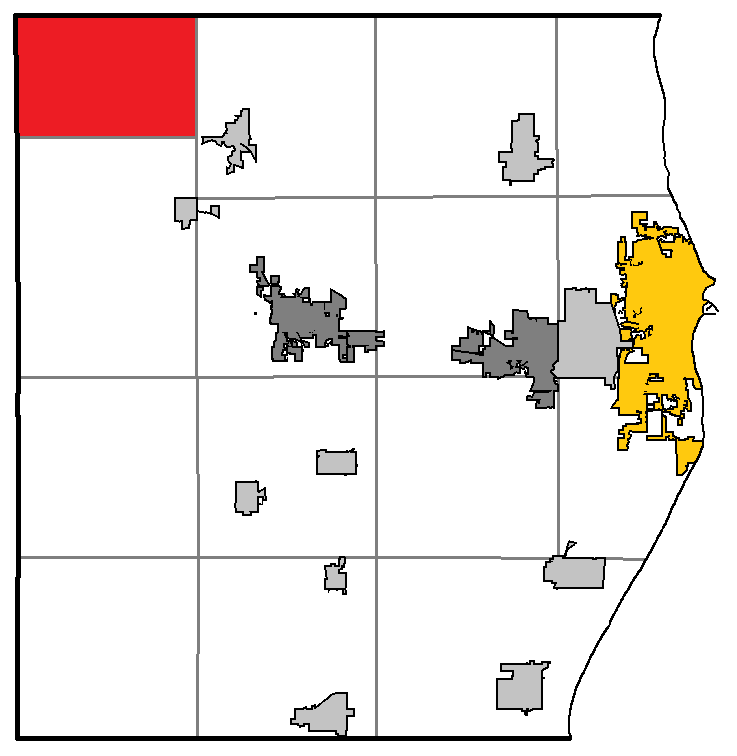
- Location of Russell, within Sheboygan County
- Coordinates: 43°52′6″N 88°4′11″W
- Country: United States
- State: Wisconsin
- County: Sheboygan

Area
  - Total: 24.1 sq mi (62.5 km^{2})
  - Land: 23.1 sq mi (59.8 km^{2})
  - Water: 1.0 sq mi (2.7 km^{2})
- Elevation: 909 ft (277 m)

Population (2020)
  - Total: 384
  - Density: 16.6/sq mi (6.42/km^{2})
- Time zone: UTC-6 (Central (CST))
  - Summer (DST): UTC-5 (CDT)
- Area code: 920
- FIPS code: 55-70350
- GNIS feature ID: 1584082
- Website: www.townrussell.com

Russell is a town in Sheboygan County, Wisconsin, United States. The population was 384 at the 2020 census. It is included in the Sheboygan, Wisconsin Metropolitan Statistical Area. The unincorporated community of Hulls Crossing is in the town, as is part of the unincorporated community of St. Anna.

== History ==
The town was named for one of the original settlers, John Russell, in 1852.

== Geography ==
According to the United States Census Bureau, the town has a total area of 24.1 square miles (62.5 km^{2}), of which 23.1 square miles (59.8 km^{2}) is land and 1.0 square miles (2.7 km^{2}) (4.31%) is water.

== Demographics ==
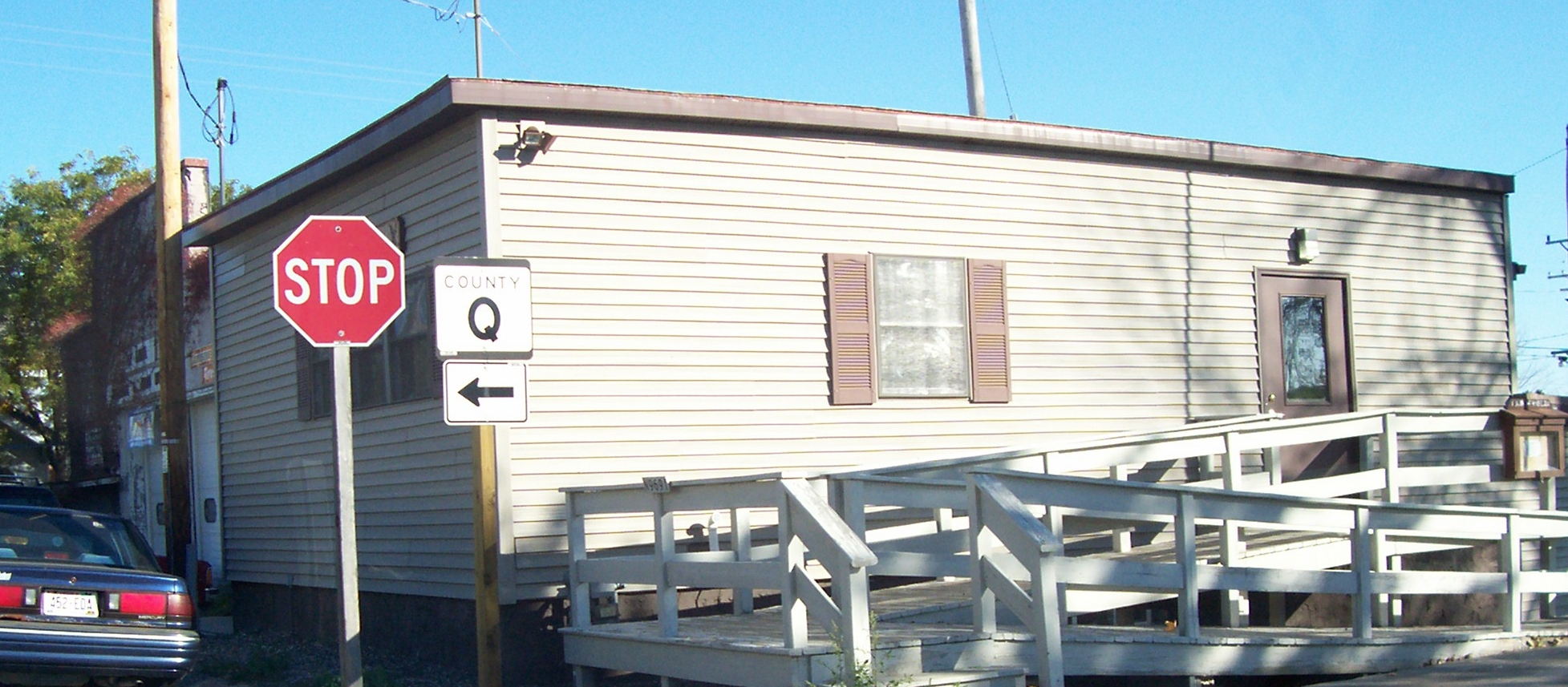
Town hall in St. Anna

As of the census of 2000, there were 399 people, 140 households, and 116 families residing in the town. The population density was 17.3 people per square mile (6.7/km^{2}). There were 149 housing units at an average density of 6.5 per square mile (2.5/km^{2}). The racial makeup of the town was 99.50% White and 0.50% Asian. Hispanic or Latino of any race were 0.75% of the population.

There were 140 households, out of which 41.4% had children under the age of 18 living with them, 77.9% were married couples living together, 1.4% had a female householder with no husband present, and 17.1% were non-families. 12.9% of all households were made up of individuals, and 4.3% had someone living alone who was 65 years of age or older. The average household size was 2.85 and the average family size was 3.14.

In the town, the population was spread out, with 28.3% under the age of 18, 5.8% from 18 to 24, 32.1% from 25 to 44, 20.6% from 45 to 64, and 13.3% who were 65 years of age or older. The median age was 37 years. For every 100 females, there were 122.9 males. For every 100 females age 18 and over, there were 116.7 males.

The median income for a household in the town was $51,250, and the median income for a family was $55,385. Males had a median income of $35,250 versus $25,417 for females. The per capita income for the town was $18,329. None of the families and 0.5% of the population were living below the poverty line, including no under eighteens and none of those over 64.

== Notable people ==
- Wilfrid J. Turba, Wisconsin farmer and state legislator was born in Russell
