= Hulls Crossing, Wisconsin =

- Unincorporated community
- Location within Wisconsin Location within the United States
- Coordinates: 43°48′57″N 88°06′41″W
- Country: United States
- State: Wisconsin
- County: Sheboygan
- Elevation: 935 ft (285 m)
- Time zone: UTC-6 (Central (CST))
  - Summer (DST): UTC-5 (CDT)
- Area code: 920
- GNIS feature ID: 1577650

Hulls Crossing is an unincorporated community located in the town of Russell, Sheboygan County, Wisconsin, United States. The community was named for J. D. Hull, the original owner of the town site.
