= Sherman, Sheboygan County, Wisconsin =

Sherman, Wisconsin
- Town
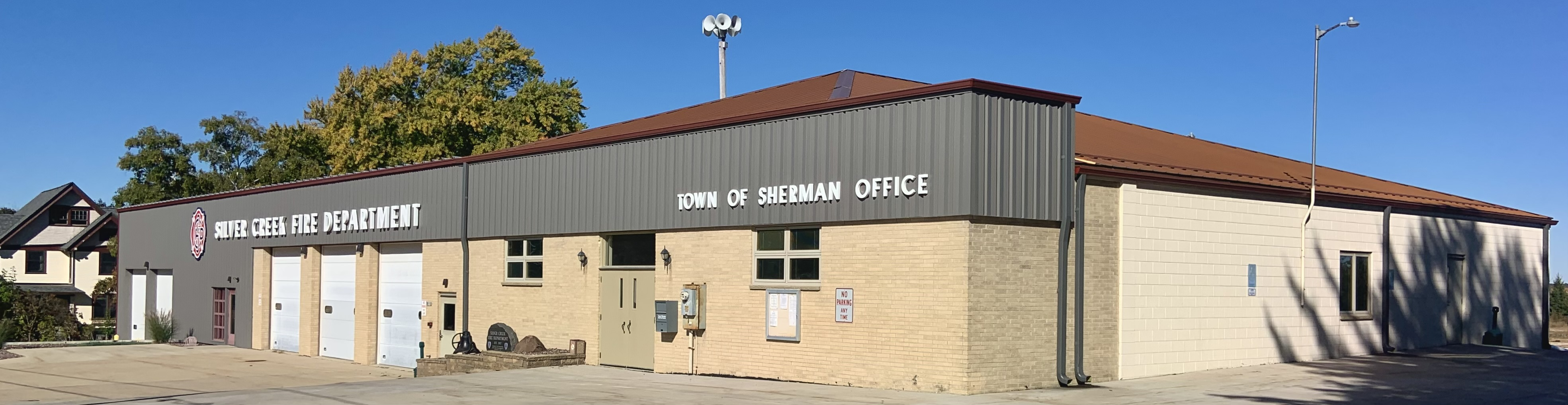
- Town hall

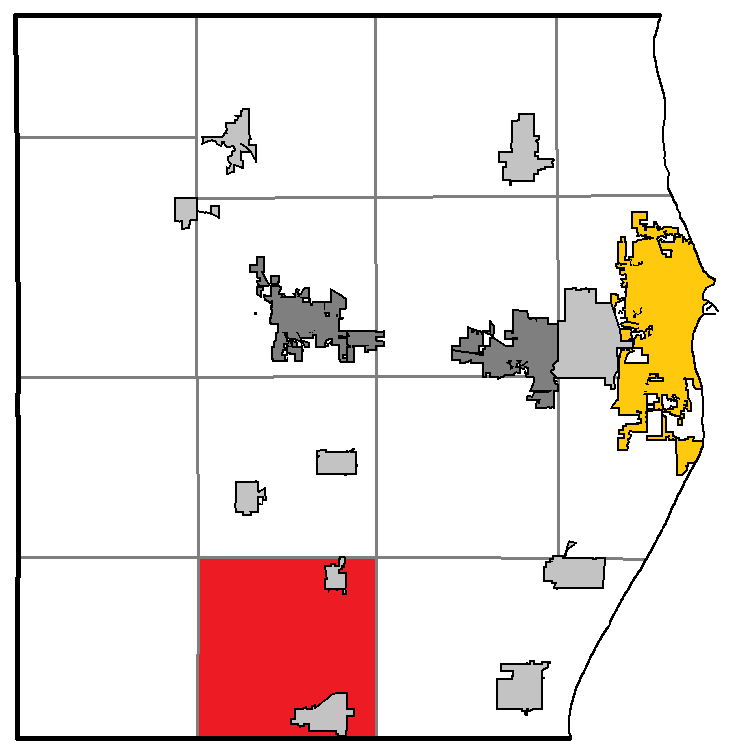
- Location of Sherman, within Sheboygan County
- Coordinates: 43°35′14″N 87°58′56″W
- Country: United States
- State: Wisconsin
- County: Sheboygan

Area
  - Total: 34.3 sq mi (88.8 km^{2})
  - Land: 34.2 sq mi (88.7 km^{2})
  - Water: 0.039 sq mi (0.1 km^{2})
- Elevation: 899 ft (274 m)

Population (2020)
  - Total: 1,452
  - Density: 42.4/sq mi (16.4/km^{2})
- Time zone: UTC-6 (Central (CST))
  - Summer (DST): UTC-5 (CDT)
- Area code: 920
- FIPS code: 55-73425
- GNIS feature ID: 1584148
- Website: https://shermanshebcowi.gov/

Sherman is a town in Sheboygan County, Wisconsin, United States whose population was 1,452 at the 2020 census. It is included in the Sheboygan, Wisconsin Metropolitan Statistical Area. The unincorporated communities of Gooseville and Silver Creek are located in the town.

== History ==
The town was created in 1850 as the town of Abbott. Due to the Abbot family, whom the town was named for, holding Confederate sympathies during the Civil War, the family was forced from the town, and its name was changed to Sherman on March 25, 1865, in honor of Union General William Tecumseh Sherman. The town does maintain one link to its original namesake in Abbott Road.

== Geography ==
According to the United States Census Bureau, the town has a total area of 34.3 square miles (88.8 km^{2}), of which 34.2 square miles (88.7 km^{2}) is land and 0.04 square miles (0.1 km^{2}) (0.12%) is water.

== Demographics ==
As of the census of 2000, there were 1,520 people, 533 households, and 429 families residing in the town. The population density was 44.4 people per square mile (17.1/km^{2}). There were 544 housing units at an average density of 15.9 per square mile (6.1/km^{2}). The racial makeup of the town was 98.36% White, 0.26% African American, 0.13% Native American, 0.07% Asian, 0.79% from other races, and 0.39% from two or more races. Hispanic or Latino of any race were 1.45% of the population.

There were 533 households, out of which 37.7% had children under the age of 18 living with them, 71.7% were married couples living together, 4.3% had a female householder with no husband present, and 19.5% were non-families. 16.5% of all households were made up of individuals, and 6.4% had someone living alone who was 65 years of age or older. The average household size was 2.85 and the average family size was 3.20.

In the town, the population was spread out, with 27.8% under the age of 18, 7.0% from 18 to 24, 30.4% from 25 to 44, 24.9% from 45 to 64, and 9.9% who were 65 years of age or older. The median age was 38 years. For every 100 females, there were 104.3 males. For every 100 females age 18 and over, there were 107.4 males.

The median income for a household in the town was $52,375, and the median income for a family was $60,625. Males had a median income of $38,750 versus $26,019 for females. The per capita income for the town was $21,710. About 2.1% of families and 3.8% of the population were below the poverty line, including 4.7% of those under age 18 and 2.3% of those age 65 or over.

== See also ==
- List of towns in Wisconsin
