= Batavia, Wisconsin =

Batavia
- Unincorporated community Census designated place
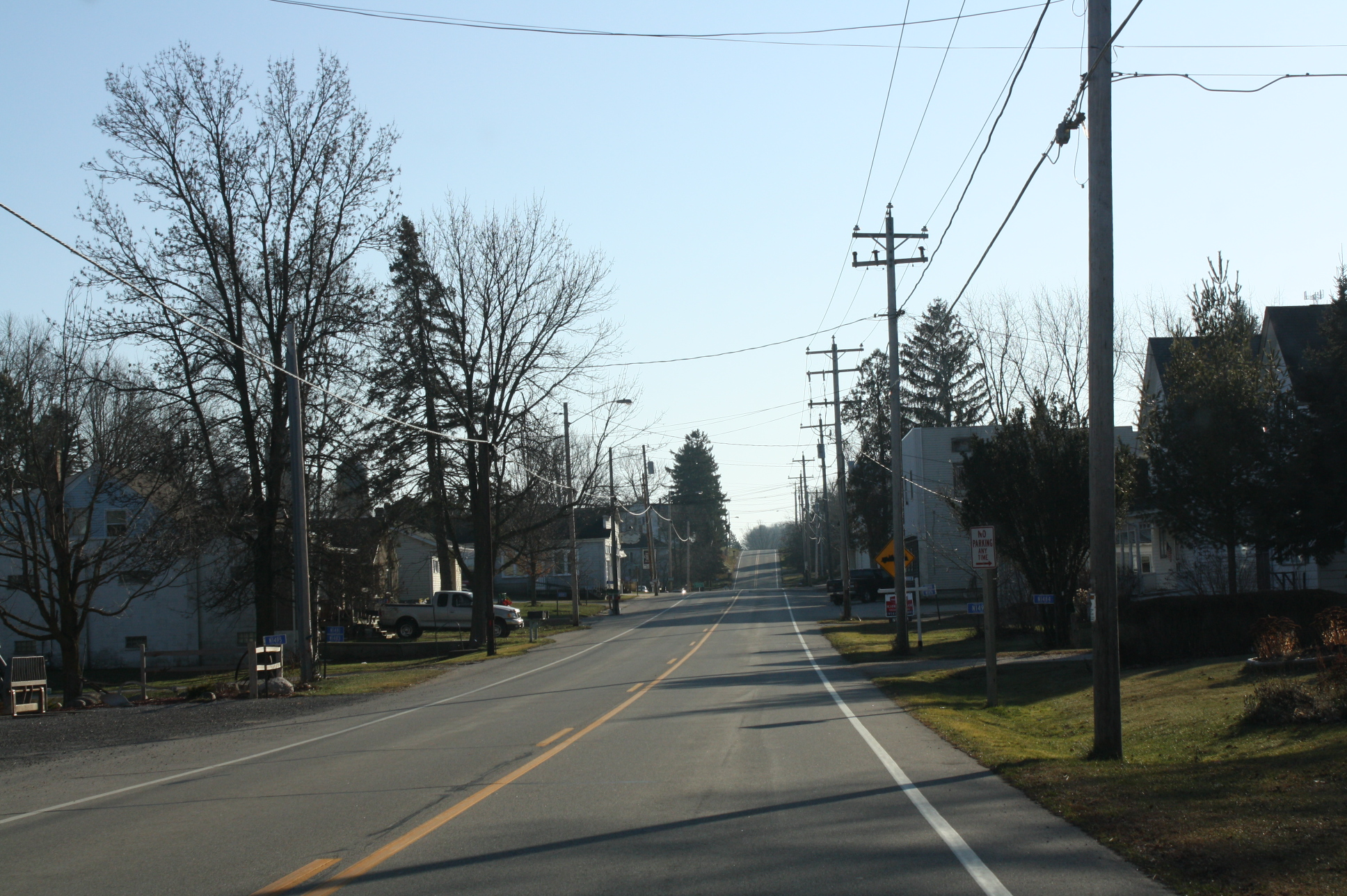
- Looking south in downtown Batavia along WIS 28

- Location within the state of Wisconsin
- Coordinates: 43°35′40″N 88°3′3″W
- Country: United States
- State: Wisconsin
- County: Sheboygan
- Time zone: UTC-6 (Central (CST))
  - Summer (DST): UTC-5 (CDT)
- Area code: 920

Batavia, Wisconsin is an unincorporated community and census designated place (CDP) in the Town of Scott, in Sheboygan County, Wisconsin, United States, along Wisconsin Highway 28.

== Etymology ==
The origin of the “Batavia” moniker most likely comes from Batavia, New York.

== Geography ==
Batavia is approximately 5 mi. (8 km) northwest from Random Lake and 5.5 mi. (9 km) southwest from Adell.

== Images ==
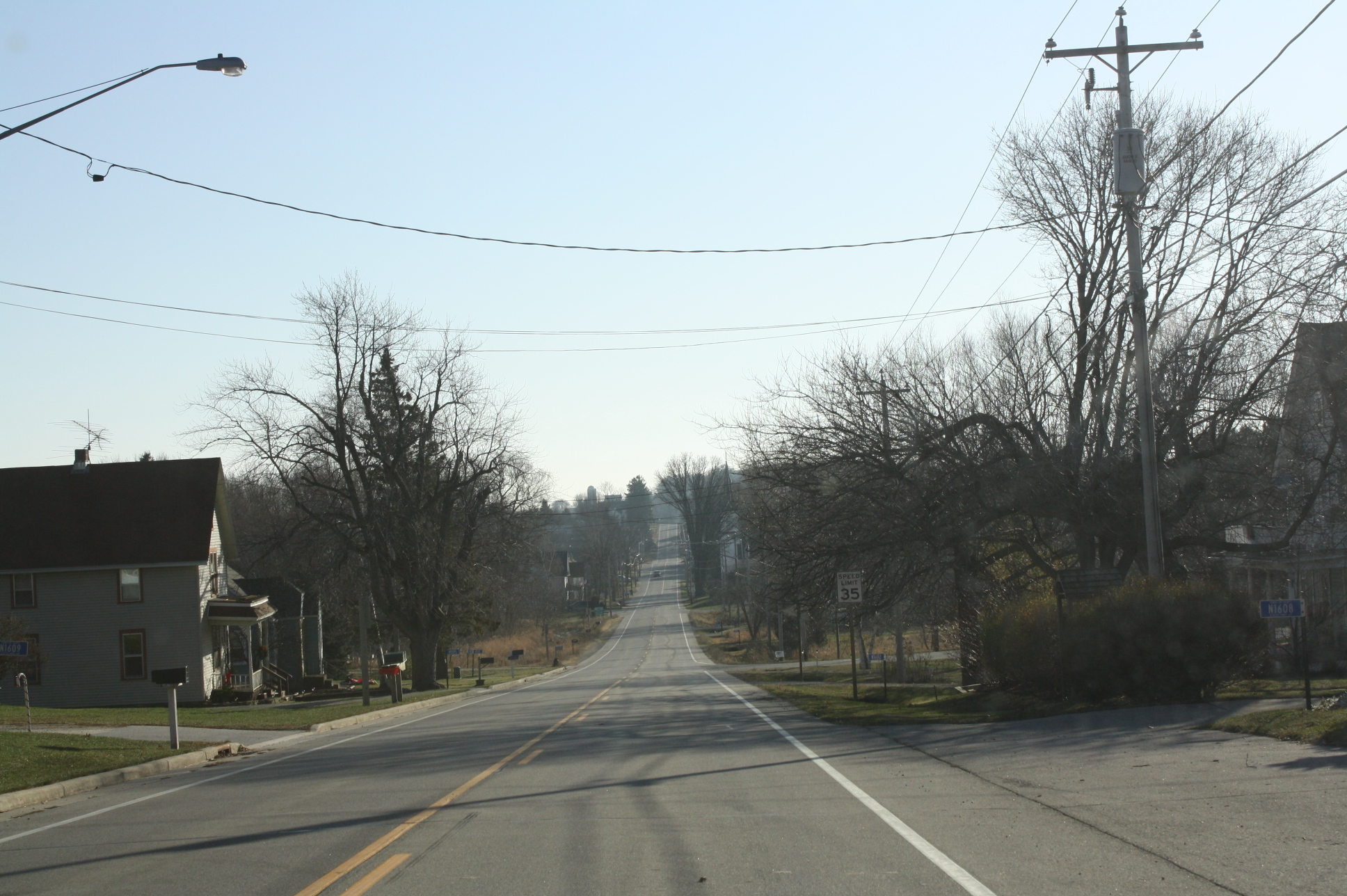
Panorama looking south

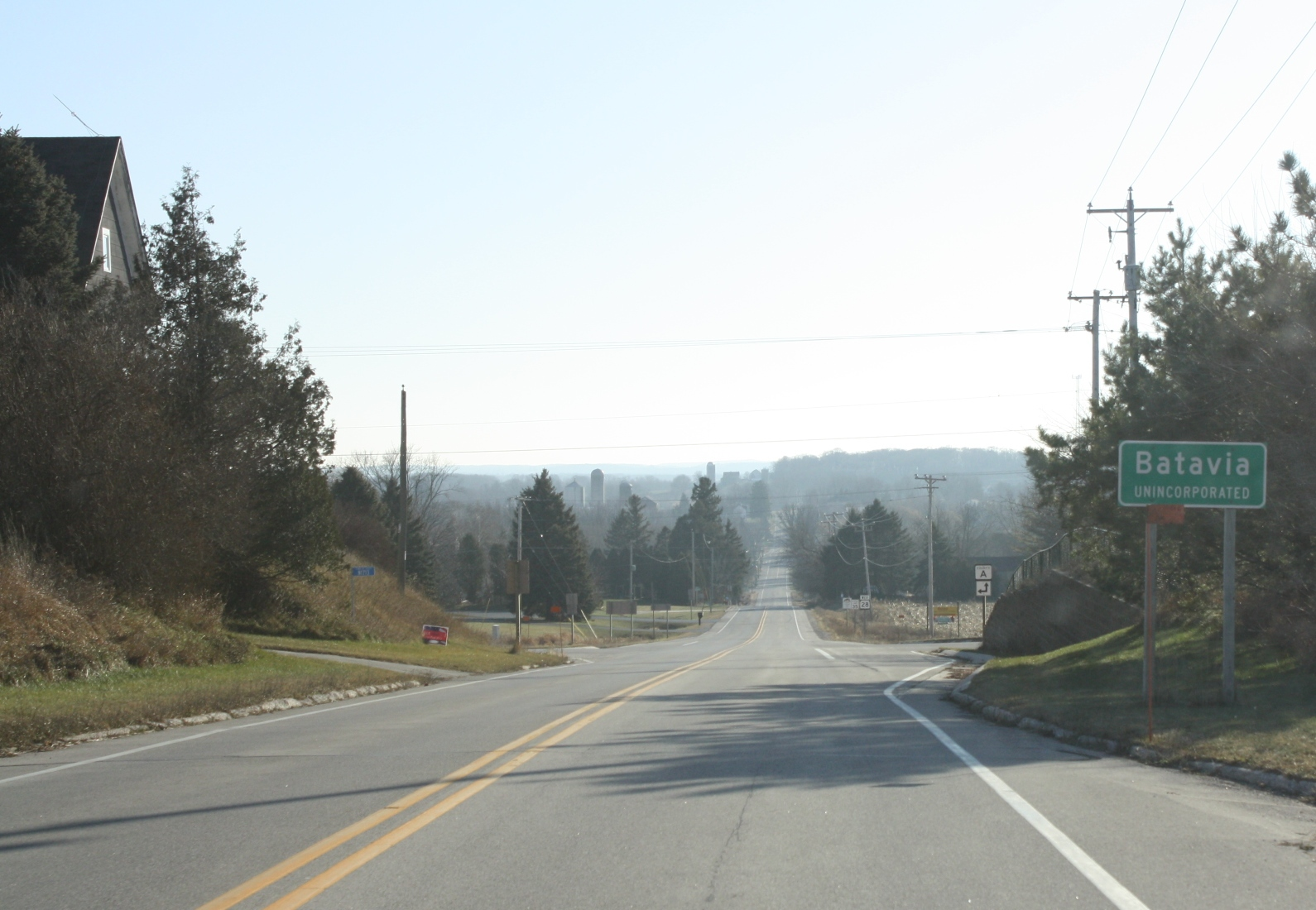
Looking south at the sign for Batavia
