= Eugene McIntyre =

American politician (1847-1927)

Eugene McIntyre was a member of the Wisconsin State Assembly in the USA.

== Biography ==
McIntyre was born on May 29, 1847, in what is now Lyndon, Sheboygan County, Wisconsin. In 1871, McIntyre married Rosabelle C. Harmon. They had five children. He died in 1927.

== Assembly career ==
McIntyre was a member of the assembly in 1880. He was a Republican.
