= Lyndon, Sheboygan County, Wisconsin =

Lyndon, Wisconsin
- Town
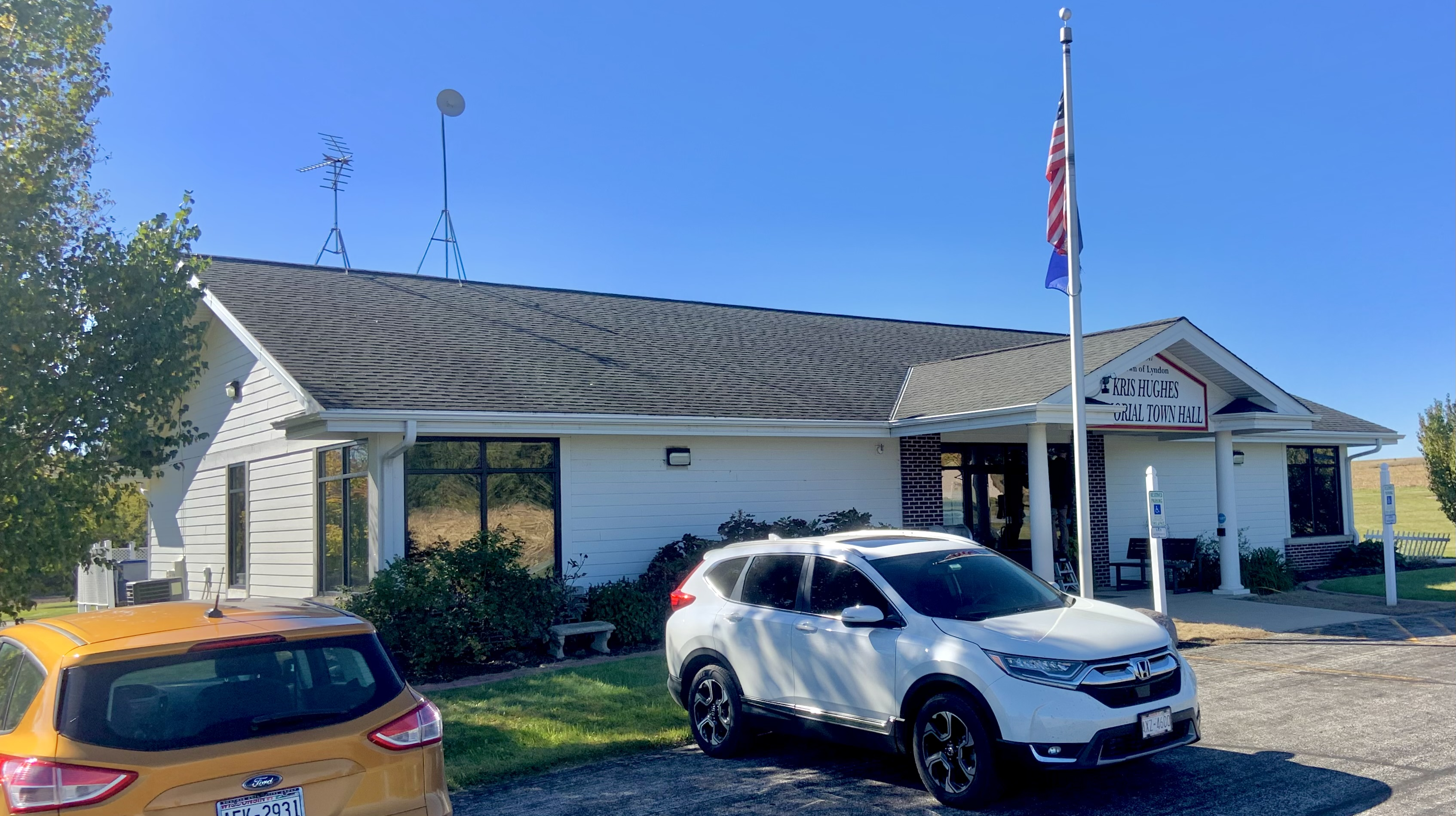
- Town hall

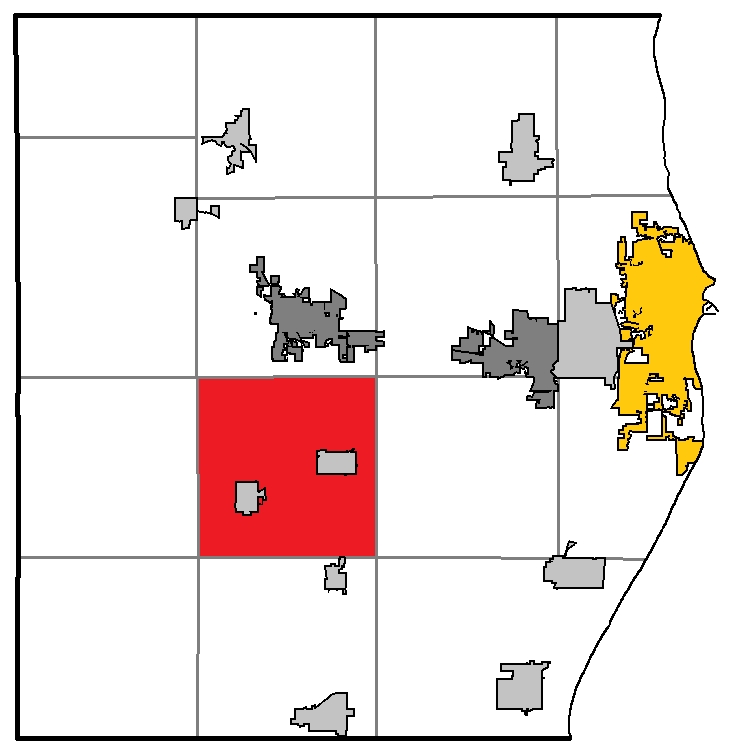
- Location of Lyndon, within Sheboygan County
- Coordinates: 43°40′17″N 87°58′54″W
- Country: United States
- State: Wisconsin
- County: Sheboygan

Area
  - Total: 34.4 sq mi (89.0 km^{2})
  - Land: 34.2 sq mi (88.5 km^{2})
  - Water: 0.19 sq mi (0.5 km^{2})
- Elevation: 935 ft (285 m)

Population (2020)
  - Total: 1,526
  - Density: 44.7/sq mi (17.2/km^{2})
- Time zone: UTC-6 (Central (CST))
  - Summer (DST): UTC-5 (CDT)
- Area code: 920
- FIPS code: 55-46575
- GNIS feature ID: 1583613
- Website: https://lyndonshebcowi.gov/

Lyndon is a town in Sheboygan County, Wisconsin, United States. The population was 1,526 at the time of the 2020 census. It is included in the Sheboygan, Wisconsin Metropolitan Statistical Area. The ghost town of Winooski was located in the town.

== Geography ==
According to the United States Census Bureau, the town has a total area of 34.4 square miles (89.0 km^{2}), of which 34.2 square miles (88.5 km^{2}) is land and 0.2 square miles (0.5 km^{2}) (0.58%) is water.

== Demographics ==
As of the census of 2000, there were 1,468 people, 546 households, and 437 families residing in the town. The population density was 43.0 people per square mile (16.6/km^{2}). There were 630 housing units at an average density of 18.4 per square mile (7.1/km^{2}). The racial makeup of the town was 98.09% White, 0.20% African American, 0.14% Native American, 0.14% Asian, 0.48% from other races, and 0.95% from two or more races. Hispanic or Latino of any race were 0.68% of the population.

There were 546 households, out of which 33.2% had children under the age of 18 living with them, 72.5% were married couples living together, 4.8% had a female householder with no husband present, and 19.8% were non-families. 15.9% of all households were made up of individuals, and 4.2% had someone living alone who was 65 years of age or older. The average household size was 2.69 and the average family size was 3.03.

In the town, the population was spread out, with 25.5% under the age of 18, 7.0% from 18 to 24, 26.9% from 25 to 44, 30.2% from 45 to 64, and 10.4% who were 65 years of age or older. The median age was 40 years. For every 100 females, there were 113.1 males. For every 100 females age 18 and over, there were 114.5 males.

The median income for a household in the town was $56,121, and the median income for a family was $60,781. Males had a median income of $41,250 versus $22,946 for females. The per capita income for the town was $21,727. About 3.9% of families and 5.5% of the population were below the poverty line, including 10.8% of those under age 18 and 4.1% of those age 65 or over.

== Notable people ==
- Whitman A. Barber, politician
- Gustave W. Buchen, politician
- Otto B. Joerns, politician
- Edward J. Keyes, politician who served as chairman of the Lyndon Town Board
- Eugene McIntyre, politician who served as chairman of the Lyndon Board of Supervisors
- William Noll, politician; town clerk and a supervisor of the town
- Patrick H. O'Rourk, politician
