= Sheboygan County, Wisconsin =

County in Wisconsin, United States

Coordinates: 43.72°N 87.66°W

- County
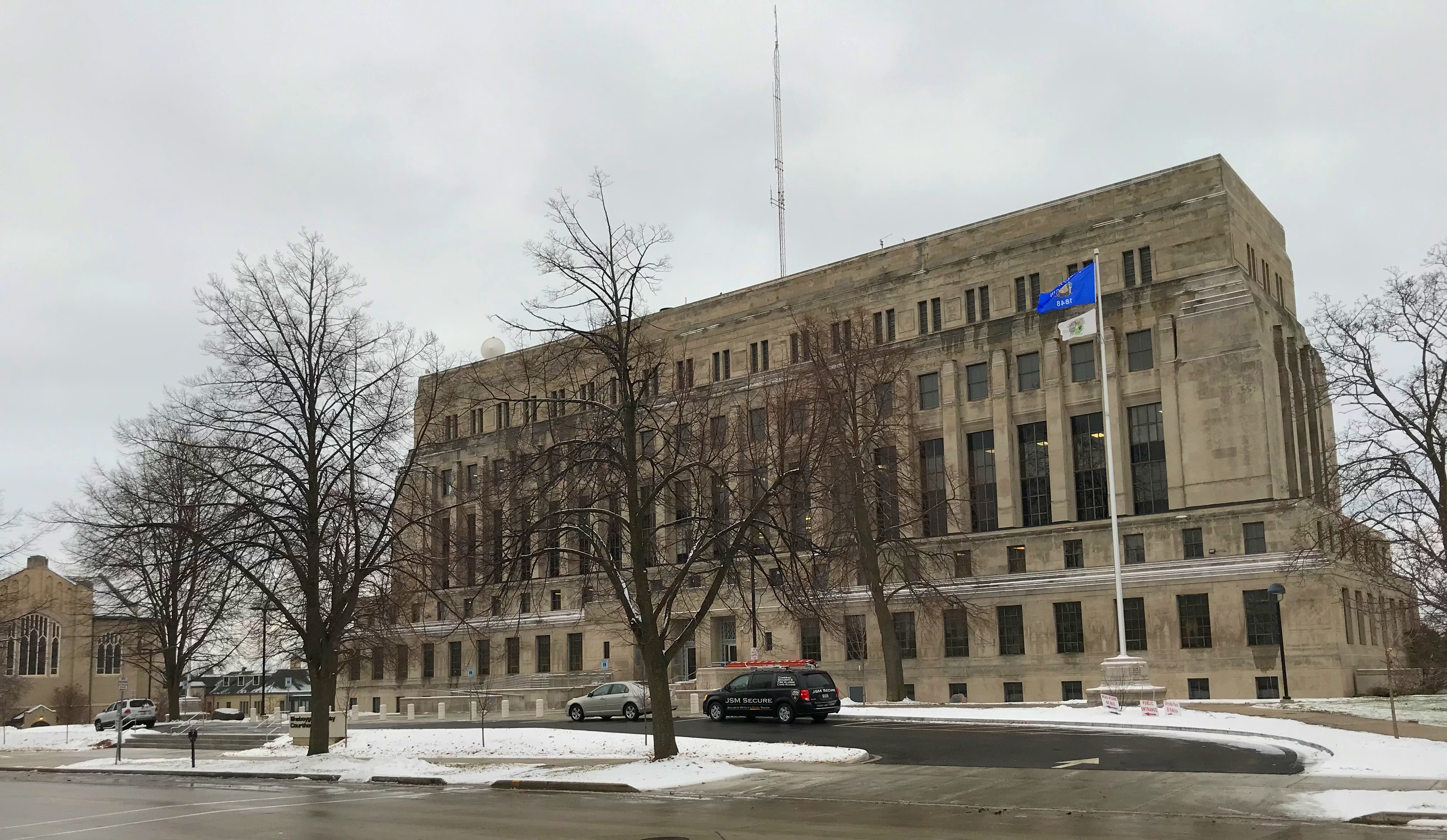
- Sheboygan County Courthouse

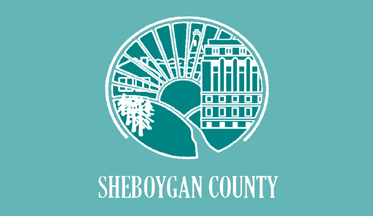
- Flag Seal

- Map of Wisconsin showing Sheboygan County

- Wisconsin's location in the contiguous United States
- Country: United States
- State: Wisconsin
- Incorporated: 1846
- Named for: Sheboygan River
- County seat: Sheboygan
- Largest city: Sheboygan
- Incorporated municipalities: 28 (total): 3 cities; 19 towns; 11 villages

Government
  - Type: County
  - Body: Board of Supervisors
  - Board President: Roger L. Te Stroete
  - County Board: 25 commissioners

Area
  - Total: 1,271 sq mi (3,290 km^{2})
  - Land: 511 sq mi (1,320 km^{2})
  - Water: 760 sq mi (2,000 km^{2})
  - Rank: 56th largest county in Wisconsin

Population (2020)
  - Total: 118,034
  - Estimate (2025): 118,047 ▲
  - Rank: 13th largest county in Wisconsin
  - Density: 231/sq mi (89.2/km^{2})
- Time zone: UTC−6 (Central)
  - Summer (DST): UTC−5 (Central)
- ZIP Code: 53081, 53083, 53073, 53085, 53070, 53044, 53093, 53001, 53031, 53026, 53082
- Area codes: 920
- Congressional districts: 6th
- State Routes: link = Highway 28 (Wisconsin) link = Highway 32 (Wisconsin) link = Highway 42 (Wisconsin) link = Highway 57 (Wisconsin) link = Highway 67 (Wisconsin) link = Highway 144 (Wisconsin)
- Airports: Sheboygan County Memorial Airport
- Waterways: Lake Michigan – Sheboygan River – North Branch Milwaukee River
- Public transit: Shoreline Metro
- Website: www.sheboygancounty.com

Sheboygan County (/ʃɪˈbɔɪɡən/) is a county in the U.S. state of Wisconsin. It is named after the Sheboygan River. As of the 2020 census, the population was 118,034. Its county seat is Sheboygan. The county was created in 1836 and organized in 1846. At the time, it was located in the Wisconsin Territory. Sheboygan County comprises the Sheboygan, WI Metropolitan Statistical Area. Part of the Holyland region is located in northwestern Sheboygan County.

== Geography ==
According to the U.S. Census Bureau, the county has a total area of 1,271 square miles (3,290 km^{2}), of which 511 square miles (1,320 km^{2}) is land and 760 square miles (2,000 km^{2}) (60%) is water.

=== Major highways ===
- Interstate 43
- Highway 23 (Wisconsin)
- Highway 28 (Wisconsin)
- Highway 32 (Wisconsin)
- Highway 42 (Wisconsin)
- Highway 57 (Wisconsin)
- Highway 67 (Wisconsin)
- Highway 144 (Wisconsin)

=== Railroads ===
- Union Pacific
- Wisconsin and Southern Railroad

=== Buses ===
- Shoreline Metro (intracity, Sheboygan)
- Jefferson Lines (intercity, Sheboygan)

=== Airport ===
Sheboygan County Memorial Airport (KSBM), serves the county and surrounding communities.

=== Adjacent counties ===
- Manitowoc County – north
- Ozaukee County – south
- Washington County – southwest
- Fond du Lac County – west
- Calumet County – northwest

=== National marine sanctuary ===
The Wisconsin Shipwreck Coast National Marine Sanctuary was established in 2021 in the waters of Lake Michigan, with its south-central portion lying off Sheboygan County′s coast. The national marine sanctuary is the site of a large number of historically significant shipwrecks.

== Climate ==
Sheboygan County

Climate chart (precipitation, max. and min. temperature)
J	F	M	A	M	J	J	A	S	O	N	D
66 −4 −9	61 −3 −9	82 1 −5	160 13 −1	123 16 6	133 18 12	106 24 15	96 25 13	77 21 12	133 12 5	71 6 −2	78 −4 −7
- █ Average max. and min. temperatures in °C
- █ Precipitation totals in mm
Imperial conversion
J	F	M	A	M	J	J	A	S	O	N	D
2.6 25 16	2.4 27 16	3.2 34 23	6.3 55 30	4.8 61 43	5.2 64 54	4.2 75 59	3.8 77 55	3 70 54	5.2 54 41	2.8 43 28	3.1 25 19
- █ Average max. and min. temperatures in °F
- █ Precipitation totals in inches

== Demographics ==
Historical population
Census	Pop.	Note	%±
1840	133		—
1850	8,379		6,200.0%
1860	26,875		220.7%
1870	31,749		18.1%
1880	34,206		7.7%
1890	42,489		24.2%
1900	50,345		18.5%
1910	54,888		9.0%
1920	59,913		9.2%
1930	71,235		18.9%
1940	76,221		7.0%
1950	80,631		5.8%
1960	86,484		7.3%
1970	96,660		11.8%
1980	100,935		4.4%
1990	103,877		2.9%
2000	112,646		8.4%
2010	115,507		2.5%
2020	118,034		2.2%
2025 (est.)	118,047	▲	0.0%
U.S. Decennial Census; 1790–1960 1900–1990; 1990–2000 2010–2020

=== Racial and ethnic composition ===
Sheboygan County, Wisconsin – Racial and ethnic composition Note: the US Census treats Hispanic/Latino as an ethnic category. This table excludes Latinos from the racial categories and assigns them to a separate category. Hispanics/Latinos may be of any race.
Race / ethnicity (NH = Non-Hispanic)	Pop 1980	Pop 1990	Pop 2000	Pop 2010	Pop 2020	% 1980	% 1990	% 2000	% 2010	% 2020
White alone (NH)	98,882	99,447	102,628	100,520	95,837	97.97%	95.74%	91.11%	87.03%	81.19%
Black or African American alone (NH)	302	412	1,189	1,605	2,434	0.30%	0.40%	1.06%	1.39%	2.06%
Native American or Alaska Native alone (NH)	264	324	354	392	362	0.26%	0.31%	0.31%	0.34%	0.31%
Asian alone (NH)	219	1,999	3,669	5,279	6,875	0.22%	1.92%	3.26%	4.57%	5.82%
Native Hawaiian or Pacific Islander alone (NH)	x	x	13	29	21	x	x	0.01%	0.03%	0.02%
Other race alone (NH)	221	27	36	64	360	0.22%	0.03%	0.03%	0.06%	0.30%
Mixed race or Multiracial (NH)	x	x	968	1,289	3,483	x	x	0.86%	1.12%	2.95%
Hispanic or Latino (any race)	1,047	1,668	3,789	6,329	8,662	1.04%	1.61%	3.36%	5.48%	7.34%
Total	100,935	103,877	112,646	115,507	118,034	100.00%	100.00%	100.00%	100.00%	100.00%

=== 2020 census ===
As of the 2020 census, the county had a population of 118,034. The median age was 41.9 years. 21.7% of residents were under the age of 18 and 18.8% of residents were 65 years of age or older. For every 100 females there were 101.0 males, and for every 100 females age 18 and over there were 99.8 males age 18 and over.

The population density was 230.7 people per square mile (89.1 people/km^{2}). There were 52,303 housing units at an average density of 102.2 units per square mile (39.5 units/km^{2}).

There were 48,702 households in the county, of which 26.7% had children under the age of 18 living in them. Of all households, 49.9% were married-couple households, 19.1% were households with a male householder and no spouse or partner present, and 23.7% were households with a female householder and no spouse or partner present. About 30.3% of all households were made up of individuals and 12.5% had someone living alone who was 65 years of age or older.

The racial makeup of the county was 83.2% White, 2.2% Black or African American, 0.5% American Indian and Alaska Native, 5.9% Asian, <0.1% Native Hawaiian and Pacific Islander, 2.9% from some other race, and 5.4% from two or more races. Hispanic or Latino residents of any race comprised 7.3% of the population.

70.6% of residents lived in urban areas, while 29.4% lived in rural areas.

6.9% of the county's housing units were vacant. Among occupied housing units, 69.5% were owner-occupied and 30.5% were renter-occupied. The homeowner vacancy rate was 0.9% and the rental vacancy rate was 5.9%.

2000 Census Age Pyramid for Sheboygan County

=== 2000 census ===
As of the census of 2000, there were 112,646 people, 43,545 households, and 29,915 families residing in the county. The population density was 219 people per square mile (85 people/km^{2}). There were 45,947 housing units at an average density of 90 units per square mile (35 units/km^{2}). The racial makeup of the county was 92.71% White, 1.09% Black or African American, 0.36% Native American, 3.28% Asian, 0.02% Pacific Islander, 1.46% from other races, and 1.07% from two or more races.

3.36% of the population were Hispanic or Latino of any race. 54.9% were of German, 7.8% Dutch and 5.4% American ancestry. 91.9% spoke English, 3.0% Spanish, 2.5% Hmong and 1.7% German as their first language.

There were 43,545 households, out of which 32.30% had children under the age of 18 living with them, 58.00% were married couples living together, 7.30% had a female householder with no husband present, and 31.30% were non-families. 26.10% of all households were made up of individuals, and 10.40% had someone living alone who was 65 years of age or older. The average household size was 2.50 and the average family size was 3.05.

In the county, the population was spread out, with 25.50% under the age of 18, 8.40% from 18 to 24, 29.80% from 25 to 44, 22.30% from 45 to 64, and 14.00% who were 65 years of age or older. The median age was 37 years. For every 100 females there were 100.60 males. For every 100 females age 18 and over, there were 99.90 males.

In 2017, there were 1,204 births, giving a general fertility rate of 61.3 births per 1000 women aged 15–44, the 31st lowest rate out of all 72 Wisconsin counties. Additionally, there were 81 reported induced abortions performed on women of Sheboygan County residence in 2017.

== Communities ==
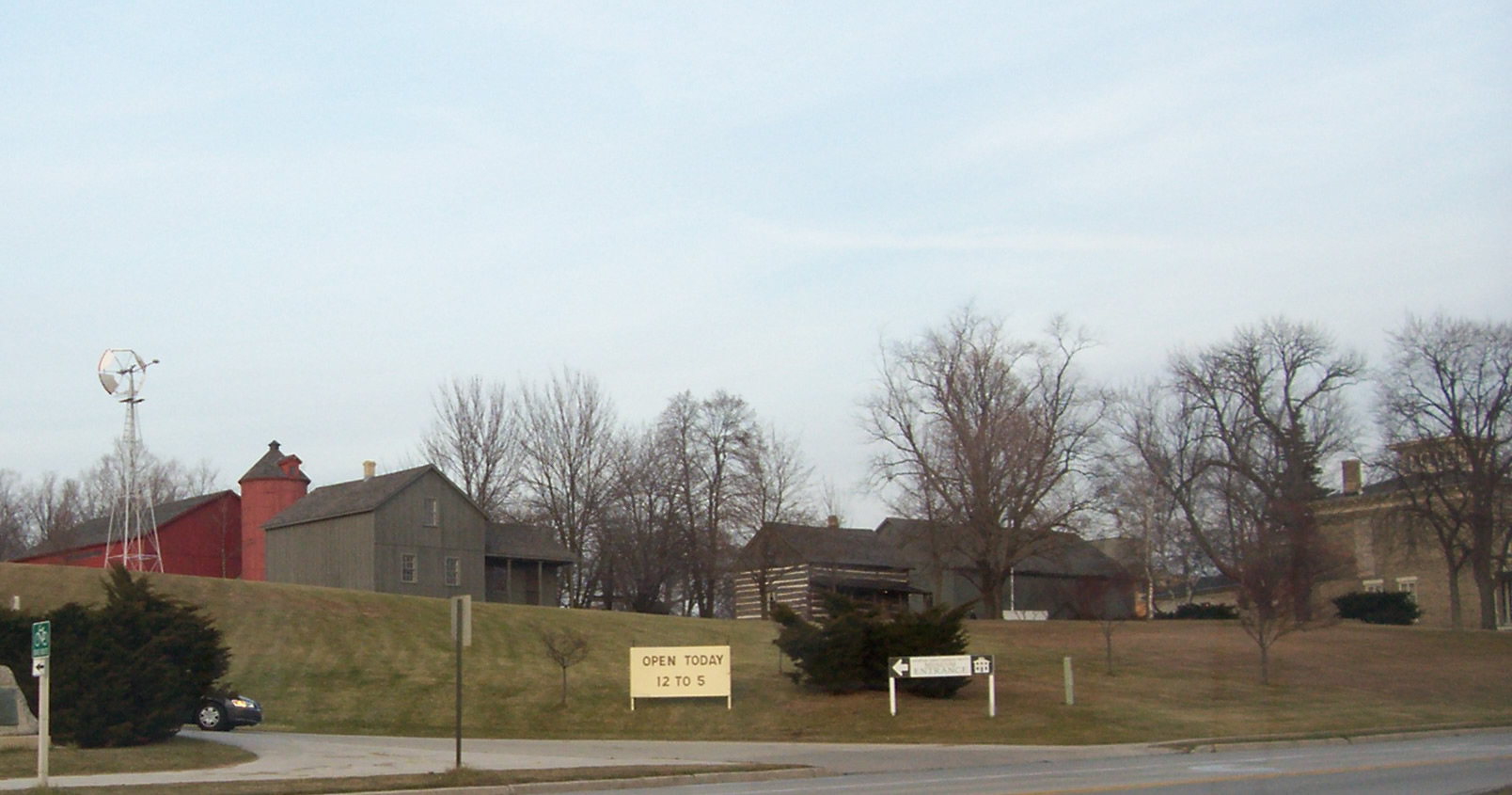
Sheboygan County Historical Museum

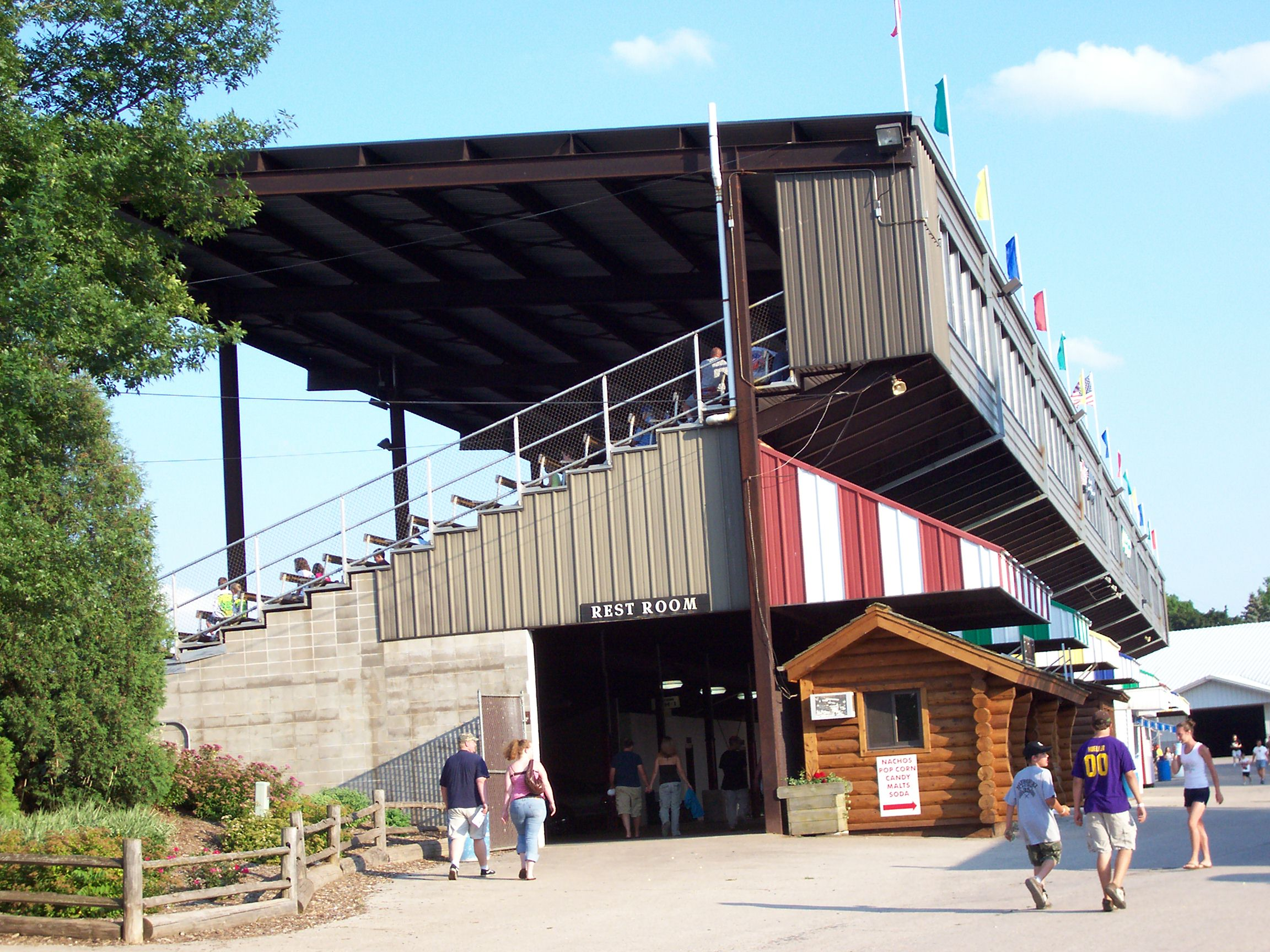
Grandstand at the Sheboygan County fairgrounds

=== Cities ===
Rank	Community	Population	Year	ZIP Code
1	Sheboygan	49,929	1846	53081
2	Plymouth	8,932	1880	53073
3	Sheboygan Falls	8,210	1835	53085

=== Villages ===
- Adell
- Cascade
- Cedar Grove
- Elkhart Lake
- Glenbeulah
- Howards Grove
- Kohler
- Oostburg
- Random Lake
- Waldo

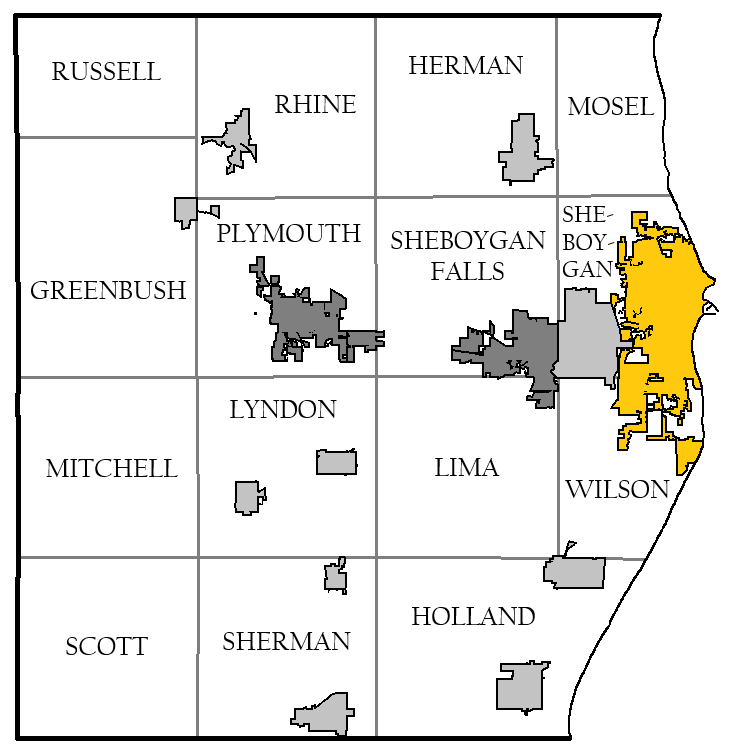
Towns of Sheboygan County

=== Towns ===
- Greenbush
- Herman
- Holland
- Lima
- Lyndon
- Mitchell
- Mosel
- Plymouth
- Rhine
- Russell
- Scott
- Sheboygan
- Sheboygan Falls
- Sherman
- Wilson

=== Census-designated places ===
- Batavia
- Gibbsville
- Greenbush
- Hingham

=== Unincorporated communities ===
- Ada
- Beechwood
- Cranberry Marsh
- Dacada
- Edwards
- Franklin
- German Corners
- Gooseville
- Haven
- Hayen
- Hulls Crossing
- Idlewood Beach
- Johnsonville
- Mosel
- New Paris
- Ourtown
- Parnell
- Rhine Center
- St. Anna (partial)
- Silver Creek
- Weedens
- Winooski

=== Ghost towns ===
- Kennedys Corners

== Public high schools ==
- Elkhart Lake-Glenbeulah High School
- Étude High School
- Howards Grove High School
- Kohler High School
- North High School (Sheboygan)
- Oostburg High School
- Plymouth High School
- Random Lake High School
- Sheboygan Falls High School
- Sheboygan South High School

== Politics ==
Originally a longtime swing county, Sheboygan County has, since 2000, become consistently Republican-leaning. In 2024, Donald Trump won the highest percentage of the vote for any Republican since 1956.

United States presidential election results for Sheboygan County, Wisconsin
Year	Republican		Democratic		Third party(ies)	
Year	No.	%	No.	%	No.	%
1892	3,638	40.27%	5,126	56.74%	270	2.99%
1896	6,644	62.50%	3,327	31.30%	660	6.21%
1900	5,927	53.77%	4,049	36.73%	1,047	9.50%
1904	6,121	57.18%	3,430	32.04%	1,153	10.77%
1908	5,948	52.40%	4,405	38.81%	998	8.79%
1912	2,692	27.97%	3,968	41.23%	2,965	30.81%
1916	5,562	52.92%	3,885	36.96%	1,063	10.11%
1920	11,994	68.95%	1,895	10.89%	3,507	20.16%
1924	6,974	34.56%	1,350	6.69%	11,857	58.75%
1928	12,640	51.17%	11,439	46.31%	622	2.52%
1932	7,454	27.96%	18,029	67.62%	1,178	4.42%
1936	8,865	31.59%	17,415	62.06%	1,783	6.35%
1940	15,305	48.21%	15,800	49.77%	642	2.02%
1944	15,291	49.42%	15,062	48.68%	585	1.89%
1948	12,459	43.05%	15,339	53.00%	1,144	3.95%
1952	22,084	59.00%	15,136	40.44%	212	0.57%
1956	22,077	59.91%	14,540	39.46%	235	0.64%
1960	21,676	53.89%	18,425	45.81%	120	0.30%
1964	12,968	32.88%	26,410	66.95%	67	0.17%
1968	17,764	44.86%	20,170	50.93%	1,668	4.21%
1972	21,500	49.40%	21,114	48.52%	905	2.08%
1976	22,332	47.13%	24,226	51.13%	825	1.74%
1980	23,036	47.42%	20,974	43.18%	4,565	9.40%
1984	26,345	55.05%	21,112	44.12%	396	0.83%
1988	23,471	49.75%	23,429	49.66%	277	0.59%
1992	22,526	41.29%	20,568	37.70%	11,465	21.01%
1996	20,067	42.69%	22,022	46.85%	4,914	10.45%
2000	29,648	53.71%	23,569	42.70%	1,984	3.59%
2004	34,458	55.02%	27,608	44.08%	559	0.89%
2008	30,801	49.59%	30,395	48.94%	911	1.47%
2012	34,072	54.38%	27,918	44.56%	661	1.06%
2016	32,514	54.40%	23,000	38.48%	4,252	7.11%
2020	37,609	56.97%	27,101	41.06%	1,301	1.97%
2024	38,763	57.37%	27,735	41.05%	1,064	1.57%

== See also ==
- National Register of Historic Places listings in Sheboygan County, Wisconsin
