= St. John the Baptist Catholic Church (Johnsburg, Wisconsin) =

Historic church in Wisconsin, United States

- U.S. National Register of Historic Places
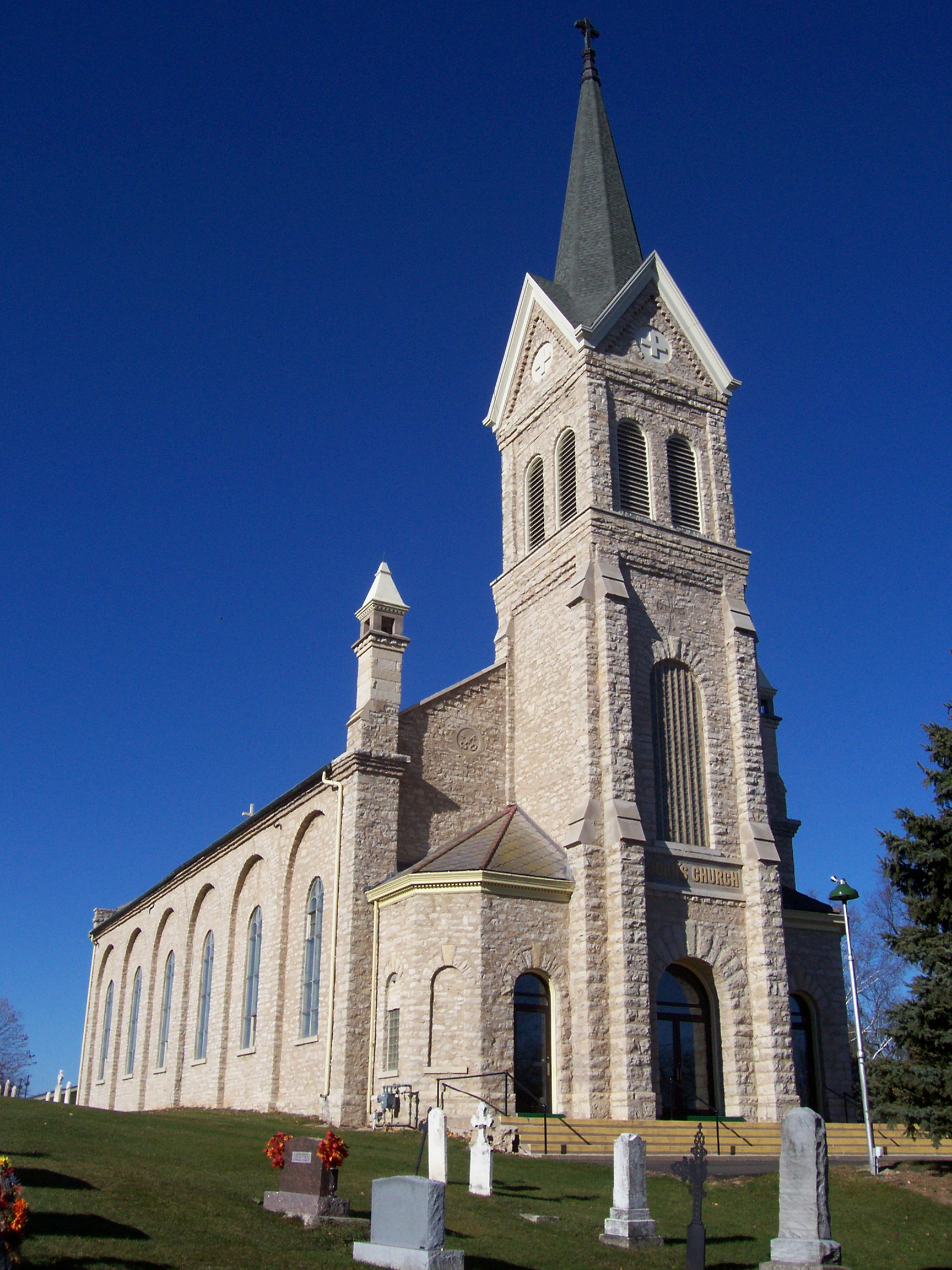
- Church

- Location within Wisconsin Location within the United States
- Location: N9288 Cty W, Johnsburg, Wisconsin. Located on County W just south of County Q.
- Coordinates: 43°52′36″N 88°17′26″W
- Area: 0.4 acres (0.16 ha)
- Built: 1857
- Architectural style: Romanesque
- NRHP reference No.: 80000137
- Added to NRHP: October 29, 1980

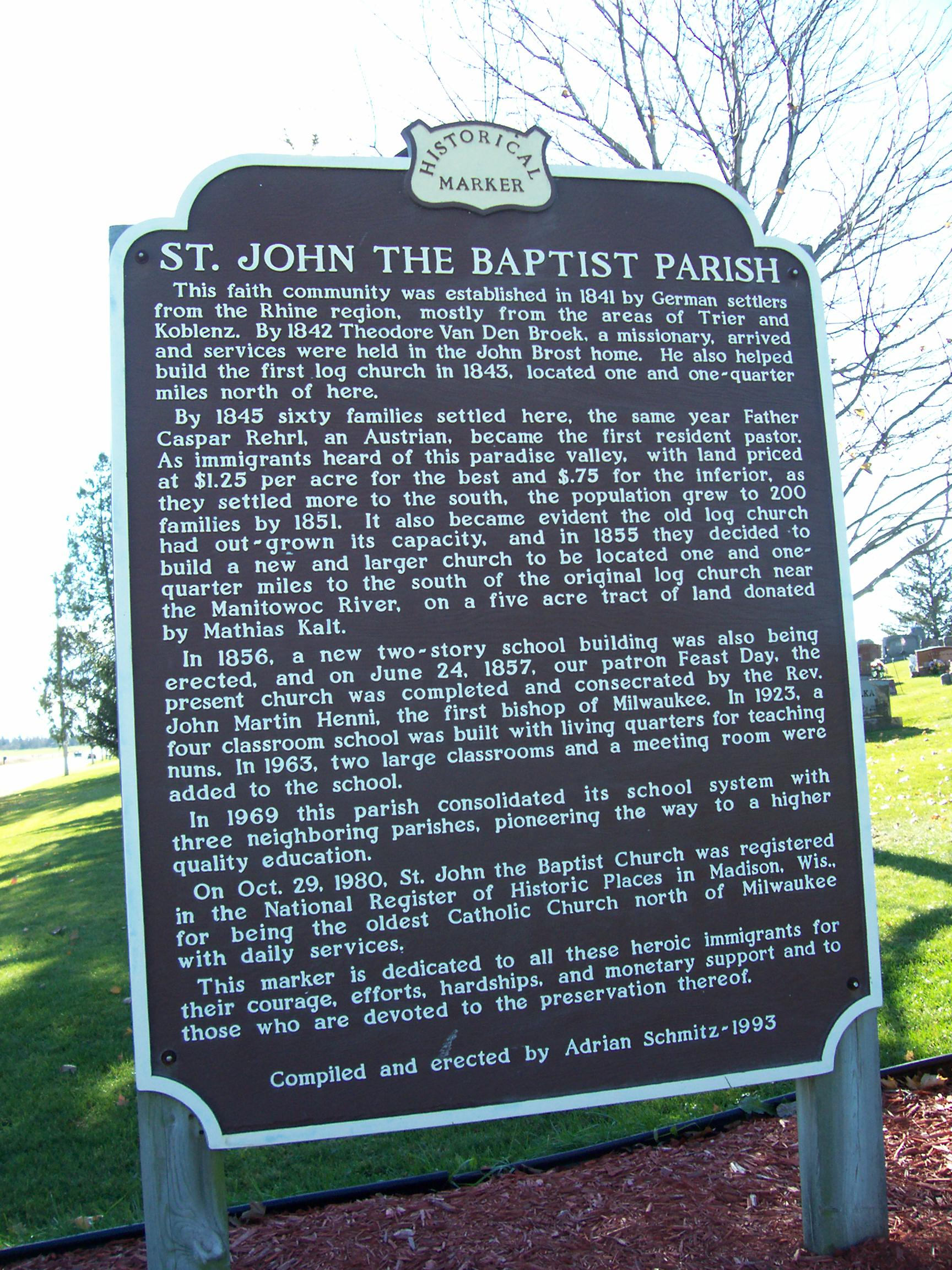
Historic marker

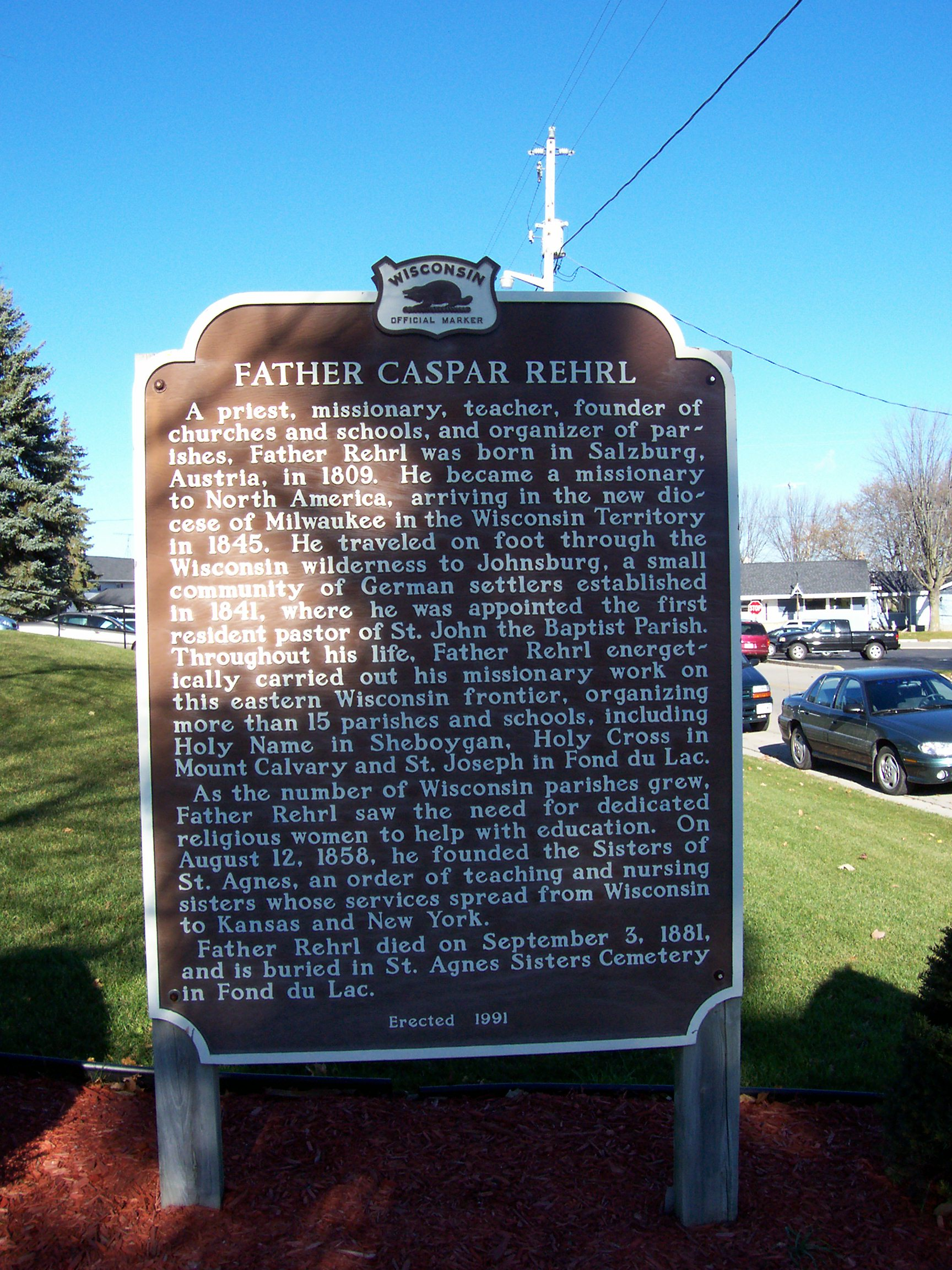
Father Rehrl marker

The St. John the Baptist Roman Catholic Church is a Roman Catholic church in Johnsburg in Fond du Lac County, Wisconsin. The church is part of the Roman Catholic Archdiocese of Milwaukee. It was listed on the National Register of Historic Places in 1980.

The parish can trace its history back to 1830s German immigrants. The first church was built in 1843 and its current structure was built in 1857. The community of Johnsburg grew up around the church which now includes a school, cemetery, and rectory.

== History ==
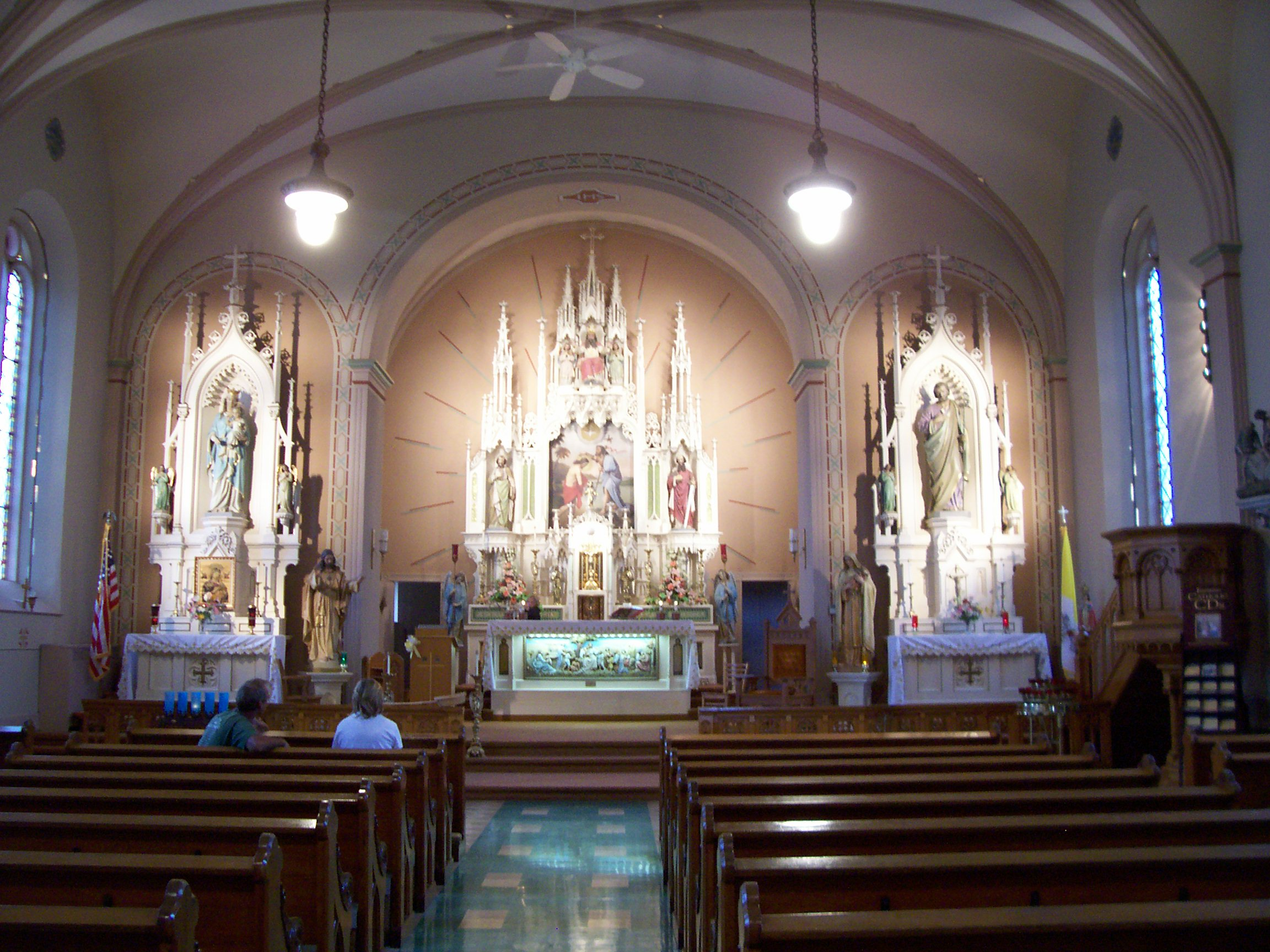
Interior

Immigrants from Prussia began settling in the Holyland region of Wisconsin in the 1830s. They began holding religious services in settler's huts with services conducted by Father Theodore Van den Broek. Members donated 2 acres of land for a permanent site and a small log church was built over the middle of 1843. Father Pete Carabin was appointed the first permanent pastor but he did not take residence. The Archdiocese of Milwaukee was formed in 1843; the church has remained in the archdiocese since. Newly appointed Bishop John Henni, a Swiss native, visited the church and parishioners were excited to be addressed using their native German language. An 1844 census of the church showed 40 registered families. The Bishop named Father Caspar Rehrl the first resident pastor in September 1845. All land within 8 miles (13 km) from Lake Winnebago had been purchased by settlers or was owned by Native Americans and parishioners built a church on the large hill in Mount Calvary which is now the home of the St. Lawrence Seminary High School. Father Fabian Bermadinger arrived from Austria (along with three Brothers) to assist Rehrl in 1847.

Wisconsin became a state in 1848. By 1850 the small log church was not large enough. Parishioners initially considered enlarging the log church, but the idea was struck in favor of building a new structure. A proposal to build a new structure to the south divided the parish. Father Rehrl resigned and moved to Mount Calvary. Father Bermadinger decided to leave to build a new church in nearby Marytown as its first resident pastor. Father Leo Susan was pastor for about one year and he was replaced by Father John Obermueller. When he arrived in 1851, the parish had 200 families. The final decision to build a new stone structure to the south was made and 5 acres was donated by a parishioner. Other parishioners disapproved and Bishop Henni came to arbitrate. Some disagreeing parishioners began building a rival stone church at the old location using $700 that one of the Brothers had been willed for a new church. The bishop didn't recognize the new structure and work stopped when the money ran out with just walls completed. Father Obermueller was frustrated with situation and resigned in October 1853. The parish went without a priest until August 1854 when Father Michael Deisenrieder arrived. He started gathering materials from nearby quarries and Bishop Henni laid the cornerstone of the church by mid-1855. The church was built from very hard limestone without an architect or contractor. The church took over two full years to build. The disagreeing parishioners refuse to support the new church and some other members were too poor to contribute. A two-story school was built at the same time. The church was completed in 1857 and a festival was held which included consecrating the new sacred building. Several families built near the church and the community of Johnsburg was started. Fr. Deisenrieder had a post office established and the town received its original name Heinzburg to honor his birthplace in Bavaria. Deisenrieder submitted the annual financial report showing a $1,800 loss (in a depressed economy) and resigned from the parish after receiving hostilities causing his assistant Father Maximilian Mueller to become the head pastor in mid-1857. Mueller was weak from illness and brought in a missionary to preach in February 1858. He stopped administering in June 1858 and died on July 12 at age 33.

The parish became more peaceful and a series of part-time Capuchin priests preached at the church. Bishop Henni named Father F.X. Pfaller as the full-time pastor in 1861; he remained until May 1862. He was the first in a series of priests to preach for one year. Father Aloys Kieser was the preacher from 1866 until 1873. Bishop Henni sold the land that the original church had been built upon; he added the conditions that the cemetery remain intact at that the incomplete church be razed by April 1, 1874.

Several priests administered the parish until Father Julius Hellweger took over in April 1879. As of 1980, he had the longest administration in the churches' history. He left Germany to avoid Otto von Bismarck's persecution of Catholics called the "Kulturkampf." Fr. Hellweger had several changes done. The interior was plastered since the original stone had only been whitewashed. A vaulted ceiling was installed, new flooring was laid, and stained glass windows were added. Equipment was added, including a new confessional, higher altar, and a sanctuary lamp. The church celebrated its silver jubilee in 1882 and it installed a new roof and heating system. In 1884 a new two-story school was built from cream-colored brick at the site of the previous school and it was completed in 1886. In 1889 he raised funds for a pipe organ and then a metal fence to surround the property. Archbishop Frederick Katzer visited in 1892 and urged parishioners to build a new tower. Milwaukee architect Robert Messmer was hired and the new tower was completed by 1894. Hellweger left on a European vacation in February 1899 and returned in August to find that his substitute has left and the parish was in disarray; he left shortly thereafter. The parish council was supposed to incorporate the parish by the archbishop's order since 16 years had passed since Wisconsin had required it. A rectory was built in 1905 or 1906. The parish was named an outpost of the Milwaukee archdiocese at the same time when diocese lines in the state were redrawn along county lines because of the addition of the Roman Catholic Diocese of Superior. The incorporation issue came up again at the end of the 1900s decade. After being closed for a short while, the incorporation papers where finally signed on November 12, 1909 by Father Francis Ruhmann and two representatives from the state of Wisconsin. A tide of anti-German patriotism swept the United States during World War I but parish men voted 40 to 34 in favor of keeping sermons in German. The parish was able to afford limited enhancements during the Great Depression including a tile floor in the sanctuary, a tabernacle, two statues, two furnaces in the school, and a garage for the rectory.

Father Benjamin Blied took over administration in 1948 after being a professor at St. Francis Seminary. During Blied's tenure, he contracted having a deeper well, automatic bells were added, the old school was razed and converted into a playground, a heater powerful enough for the church and school was installed. On John the Baptist's day in 1957, the church building's centennial was celebrated with a mass. Numerous priests who were sons of the parish had active roles in the celebration, which was led by archbishop Albert Gregory Meyer. Later that year, improvements were made including: the school yard and church approaches were asphalted, steeple repainted and its clock removed in favor of windows, and the church floors tiled. Blied left to teach college at Marian College in 1960 and was succeeded by Rev. Robert Bier.

The school was being taught by nuns and they wanted to move their housing out of the school into a separate convent to alleviate overcrowding in the school. After approving the concept in 1961, it took until late 1963 to finalize plans since there was issues with how to design an adequate sewage system. After the school was completed, the New Holstein School District rented two rooms at the school for five years. Parishioners realized that other Catholic private grade schools in the school district were having difficulty attracting non-nun school teachers. A series of meetings were organized and state officials spoke about school funding. Four schools were combined; Marytown, St. Cloud, Mount Calvary were combined with Johnsburg; St. Joe declined. St. Anna was interested to join since its school was being closed but wasn't invited to the first meeting since it was in a different diocese; the organization decided to decline since it arrived too late in the planning. No name could be decided for new school so the treasurer eventually had checks created using the name "Consolidated Parochial Elementary School" and the name stuck. Marytown and Johnsburg students in Grades 4 to 8 were taught at Johnsburg starting with the 1969-70 school year.

== Current events ==
The school building became the home of Holyland Catholic School in 2015. In the late 2010's, St. John the Baptist joined four other nearby churches to form Our Lady of the Holyland parish under the Milwaukee Archdiocese. Services are held at the church on Sunday mornings at 10:30, the pastor is Father Fr. Paul Koenig, OFM Capuchin.

== Sources ==
- St. John the Baptist Congregation, Rev. Benjamin J. Blied, 1980
