= Christian Pickart =

American politician

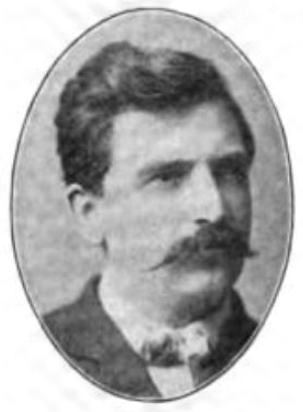

Member of the Wisconsin State Assembly
- In office 1904–1910
- Constituency: Fond du Lac County First District

Personal details
- Born: November 15, 1870 Marshfield, Fond du Lac County, Wisconsin
- Died: January 6, 1938 (aged 67) Malone, Wisconsin
- Party: Democrat
- Occupation: Politician

Christian "Christ" Pickart (November 15, 1870 – January 6, 1938) was a member of the Wisconsin State Assembly.

== Biography ==
Pickart was born on November 15, 1870, in Marshfield, Fond du Lac County, Wisconsin. He died on January 6, 1938, in Malone, Wisconsin.

== Career ==
Pickart was elected to the Assembly in 1904. He was a Democrat.
