= Malone Area Heritage Museum =

Coordinates: 43°51′32.3″N 88°16′54.6″W

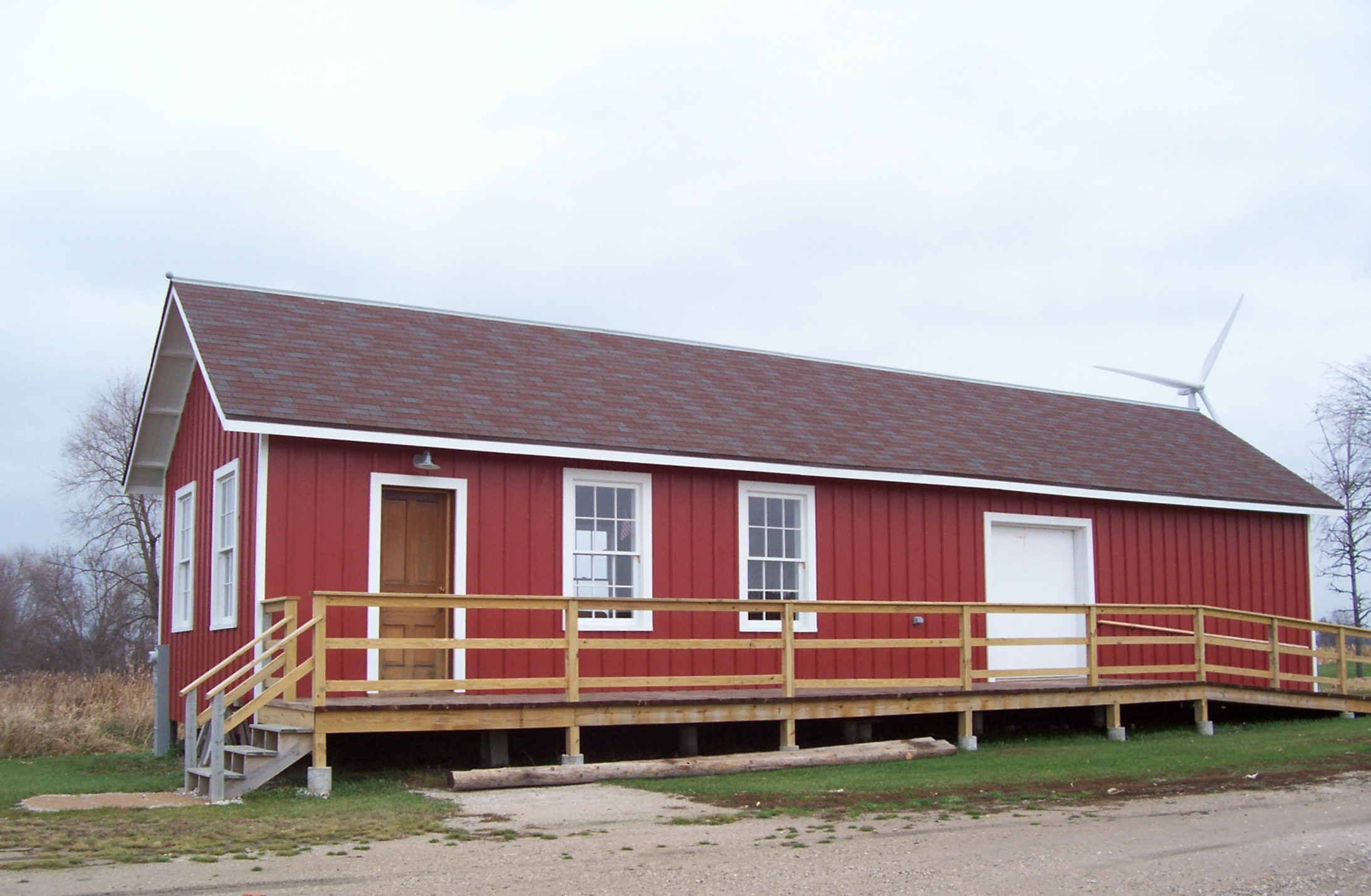
Train Depot portion of the museum

The Malone Area Heritage Museum is a historical museum in Malone, Wisconsin, United States. The museum documents the history of immigrants into the Holyland region of Wisconsin. The museum is affiliated with the Wisconsin Historical Society. It has been in existence since 2005. It is open to the public on Thursday afternoons between 2:00 and 4:00 pm and on the second Sunday of each month.

== Displays ==
The museum consists of two buildings. Both were purchased from Malone's co-op. One is the original train depot for Malone, which was moved across the street to its present location in early 2005. Had the building not been moved, it would have been dismantled because it was in the way of large trucks. It documents the development and usage of the Sheboygan and Fond du Lac Railroad. There is a piece of the original railroad that was dug up in a local field. The building is the final remaining depot from that line. The other building is a more recently purchased agricultural shop which is being adapted for displaying items as of 2008. Both buildings contain artifacts from activities common in the area, especially farming.

Documentation and photography are displayed from the local communities of St. Cloud, Mt. Calvary and its train station at Calvary Station, Charlesburg, Dotyville, St. Peter, St. Joe, Garnet, St. Anna, Marytown, Taycheedah, Johnsburg, and Silica.

== Images ==
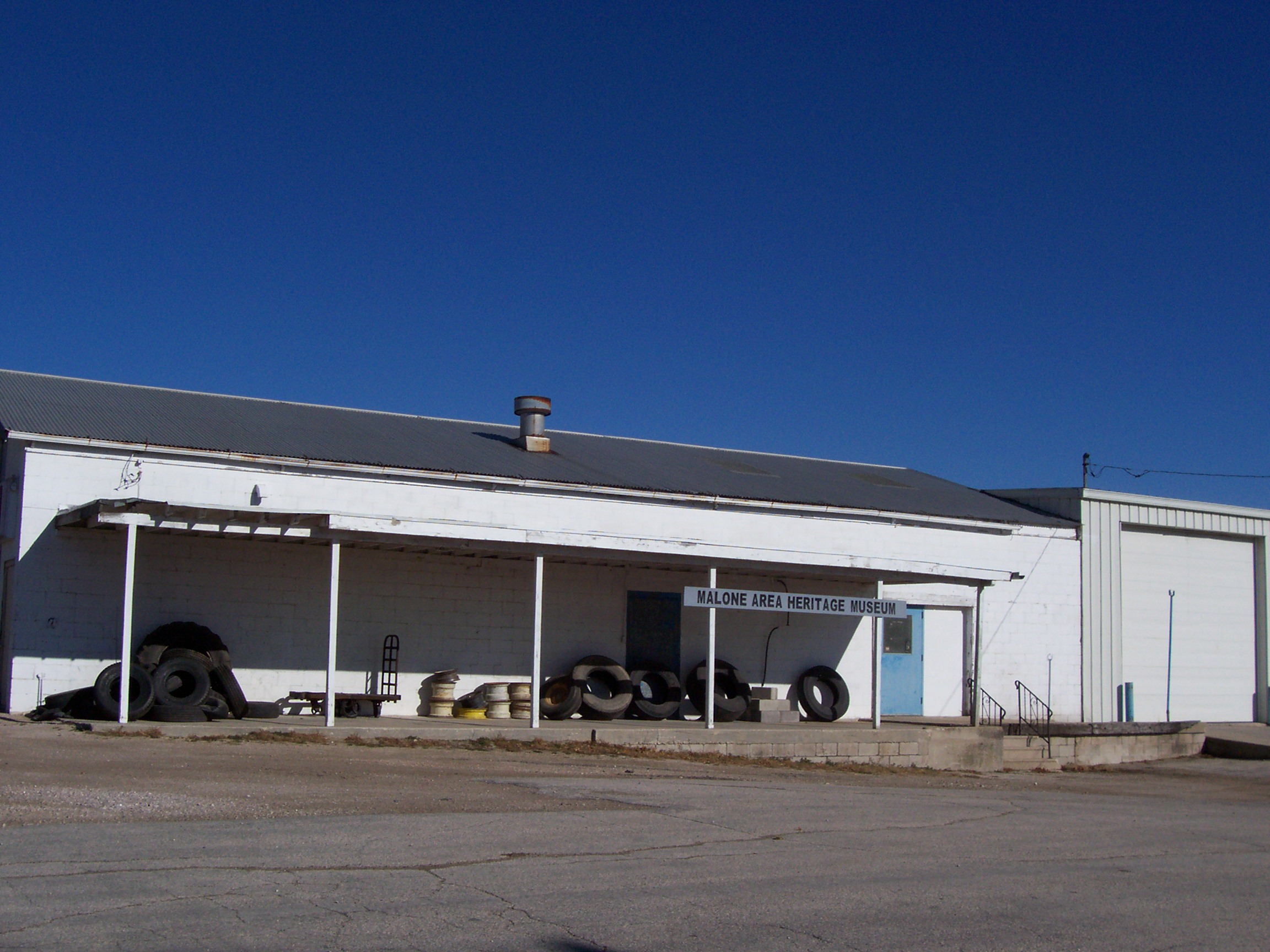
Former agricultural building under conversion

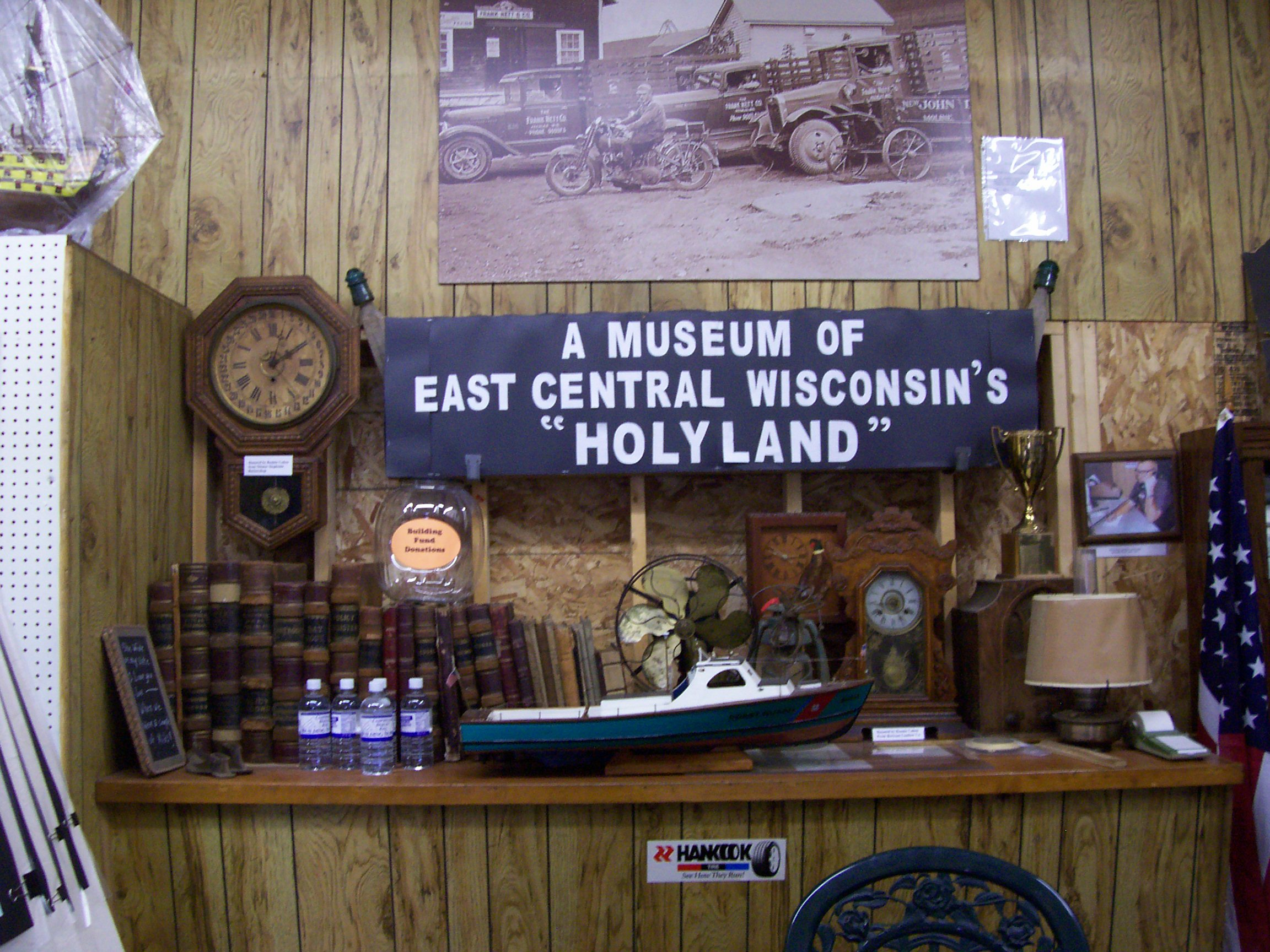
Display in the agricultural building

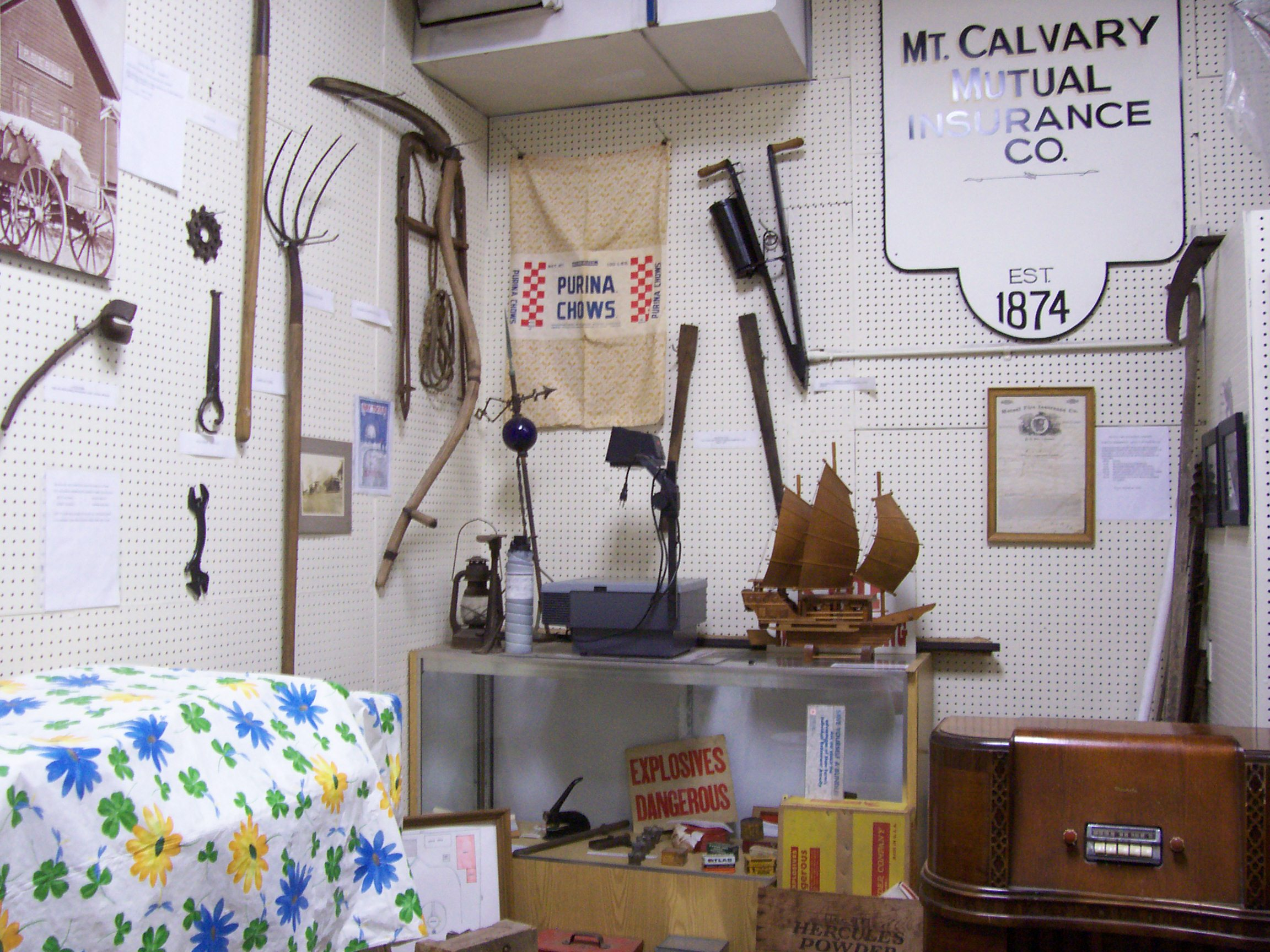
Display in the agricultural building

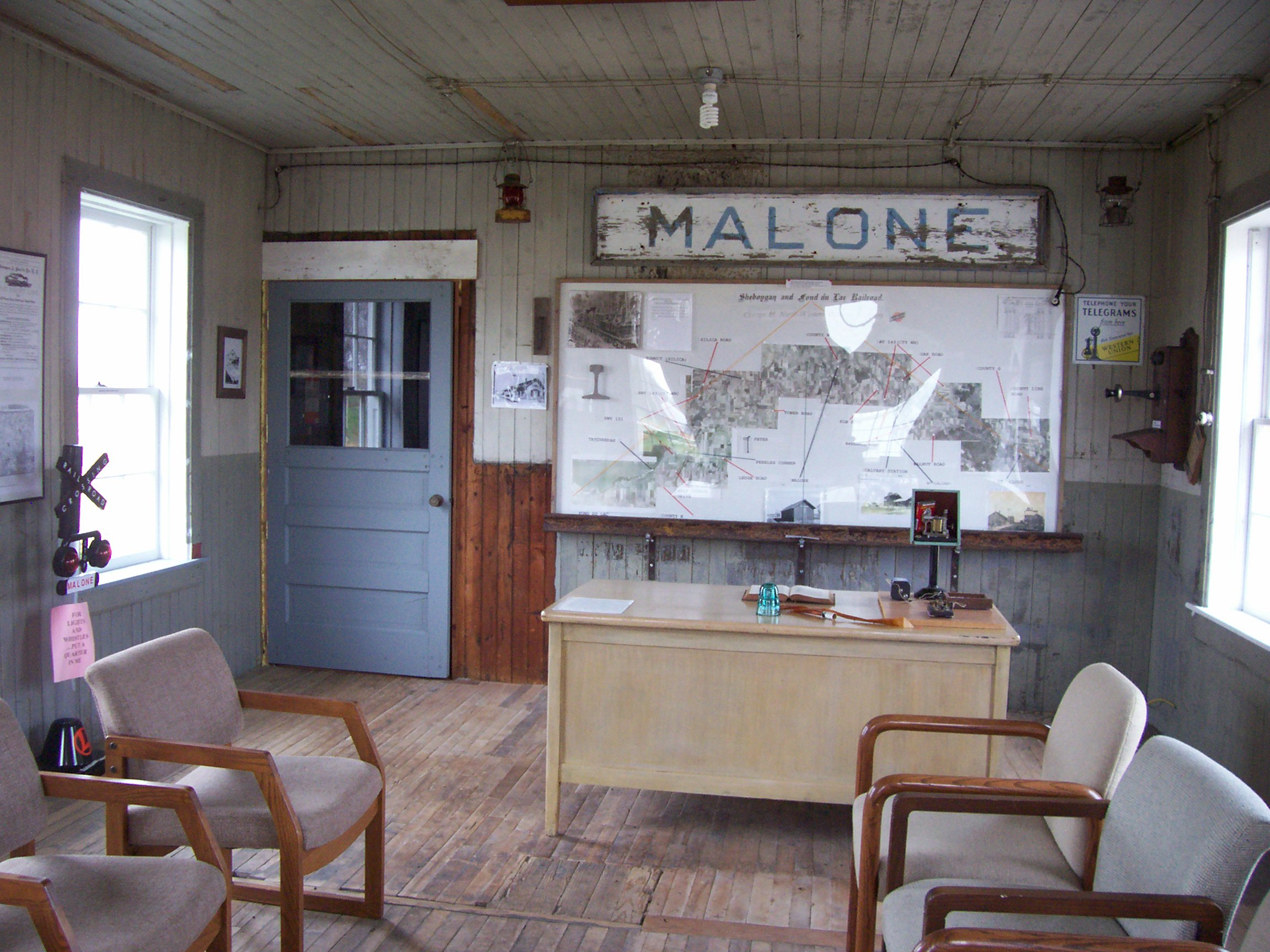
Interior of the depot building
