= Ignatius Klotz =

American politician

Ignatius Klotz, Sr. (November 25, 1843 – February 20, 1911) was an American farmer and politician

Born in Innsbruck, Austrian Empire, Klotz received a common school education. In 1848, he emigrated to the United States and settled in the town of Eden in Fond du Lac County, Wisconsin. In 1889, Klotz moved to Campbellsport, Wisconsin. Klotz was a farmer.

== Public office ==
Klotz served as chairman of the Eden Town Board as well as the Ashford Town Board. He also served on the Fond du Lac County Board of Supervisors for eighteen years. Klotz was elected to the Wisconsin State Assembly's 4th Fond du Lac County district (the towns of Ashford, Auburn, Calumet, Eden, Forest, Marshfield, Osceola and Taycheedah) for the 1880 term as a Democrat, with 1697 votes to 32 for Independent Democrat S. Simons and 8 for Republican A. Armstrong, succeeding fellow Democrat Michael Thelen. He did not run for re-election, and was succeeded by another Democrat Fred Konz. From 1885 to 1889, Klotz served in the Wisconsin State Senate, having been elected to the Wisconsin Senate, District 20 (Sheboygan County, and the towns of Ashford, Auburn, Calumet, Eden, Forest, Marshfield, Osceola and Taycheedah, in Fond du Lac county) in 1884, succeeding Democrat Patrick Henry Smith, with 6,016 votes to 4,013 votes for Republican William Noll and 78 for Israel Chesling, prohibitionist. He did not run for re-election, and was succeeded by another Democrat, Major C. Mead in 1889.

== Personal life ==
On December 29, 1882 he married Maria Wenzel. Klotz served as president of the Campbellsport Mutual Fire Insurance Company from 1895 until his death in 1911. Klotz died at his home in Campbellsport, Wisconsin after suffering a stroke. At his death, he was survived by Maria and by two sons and three daughters.
