= Malone, Wisconsin =

- Unincorporated community
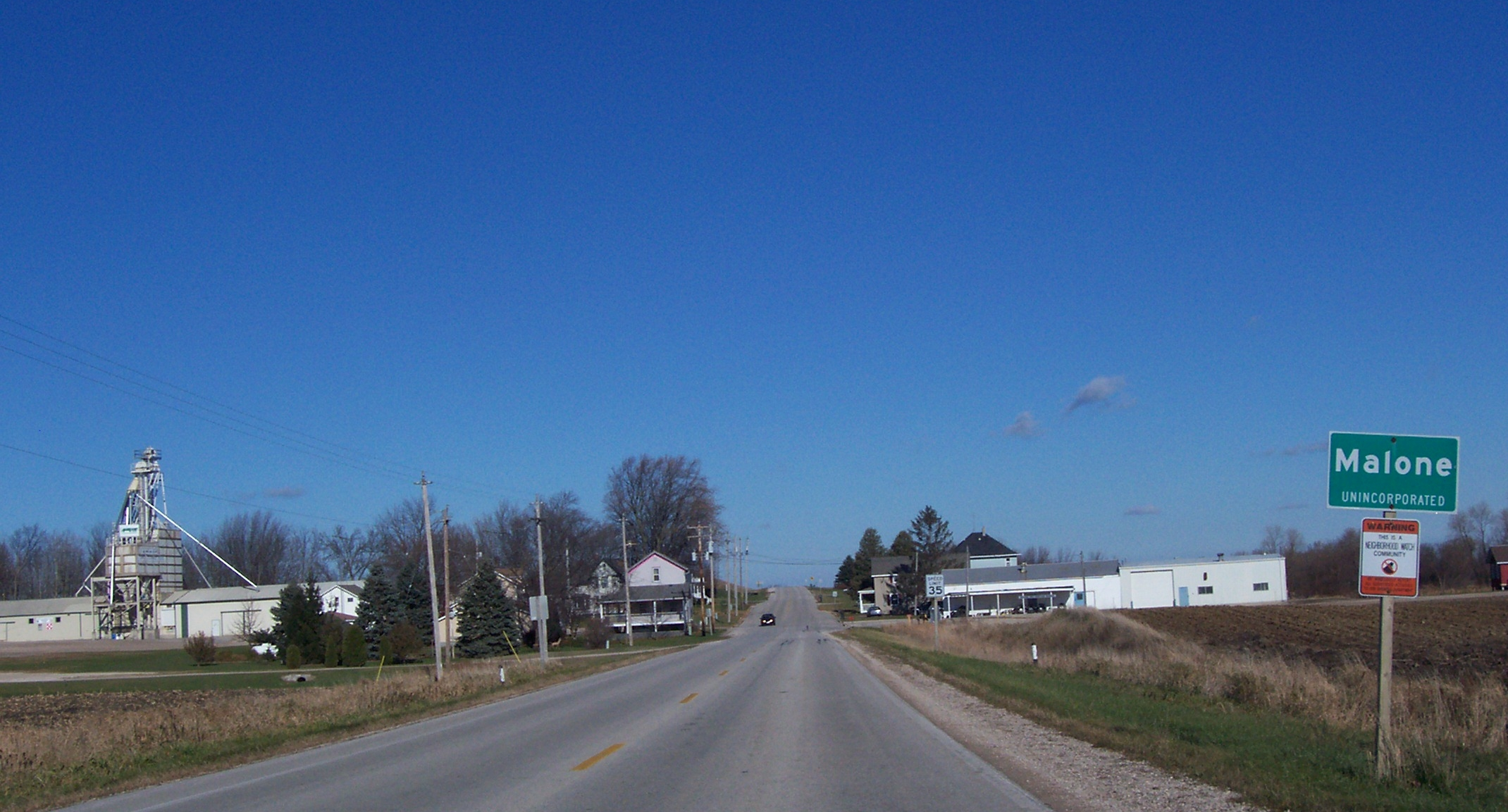
- Malone, Wisconsin

- Location within Wisconsin Location within the United States
- Coordinates: 43°51′37″N 88°16′53″W
- Country: United States
- State: Wisconsin
- County: Fond du Lac
- Elevation: 974 ft (297 m)
- Time zone: UTC-6 (Central (CST))
  - Summer (DST): UTC-5 (CDT)
- Zip codes: 53049
- Area code: 920
- GNIS feature ID: 1568921

Malone is an unincorporated community located in Fond du Lac County, Wisconsin, United States near the Sheboygan River and Mt. Calvary, in the towns of Marshfield, and Taycheedah. Malone is located in The Holyland region of Wisconsin. It is home to a post office.

== History ==
Malone was a stop on the Sheboygan & Fond du Lac Railroad. Originally named St. John, it was renamed Malone after the railroad official H. T. Malone. A post office called Malone has been in operation since 1877.

The Malone Area Heritage Museum provides an in-depth look at Malone's culturally diverse history as a railroad town throughout the 19th and 20th centuries. In 2005, the museum moved the original train depot across the street and began restoring it.

== Notable people ==
- John Durham - Medal of Honor recipient

== Images ==
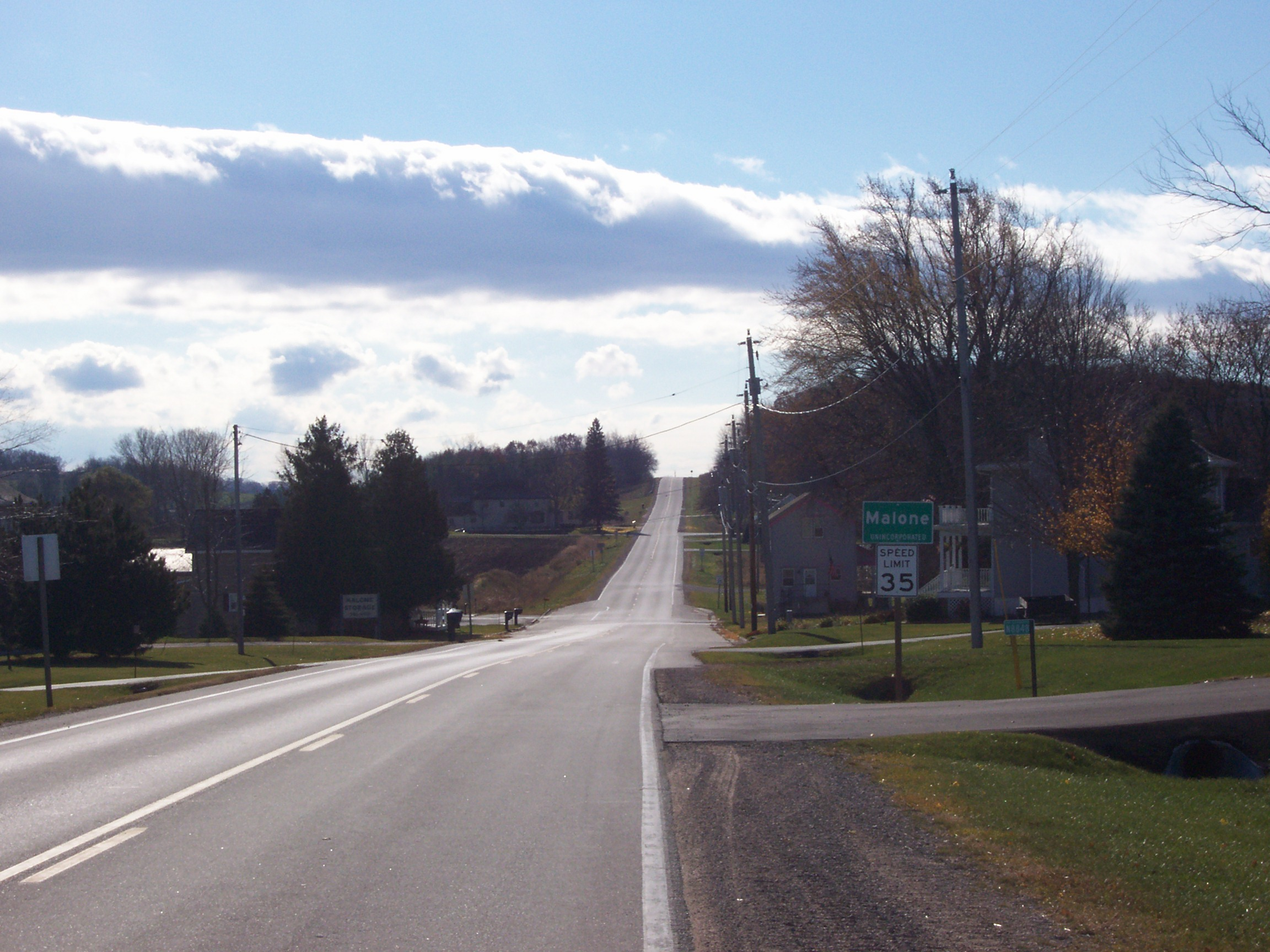
Looking south at Malone

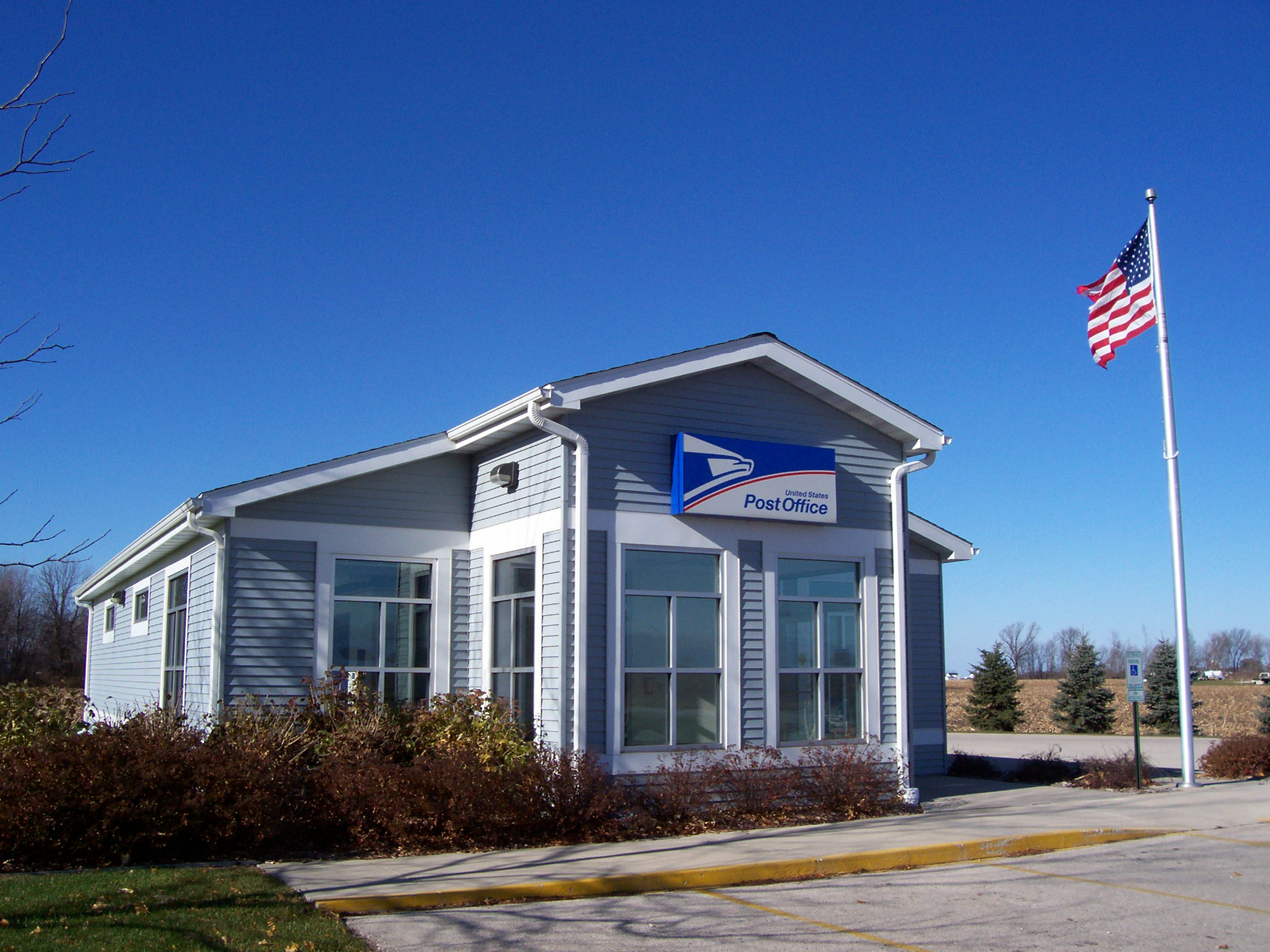
Post Office

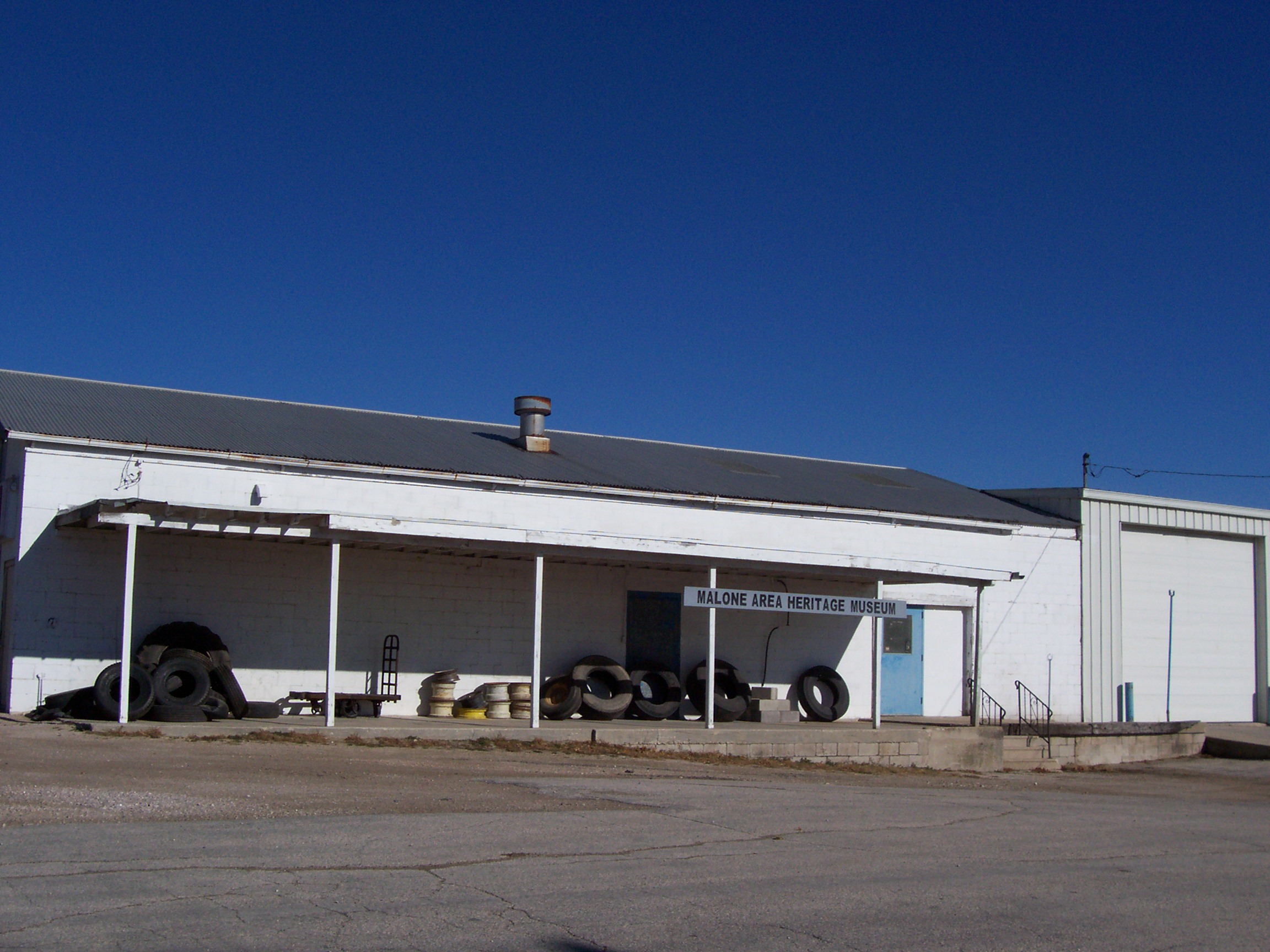
Malone Area Heritage Museum

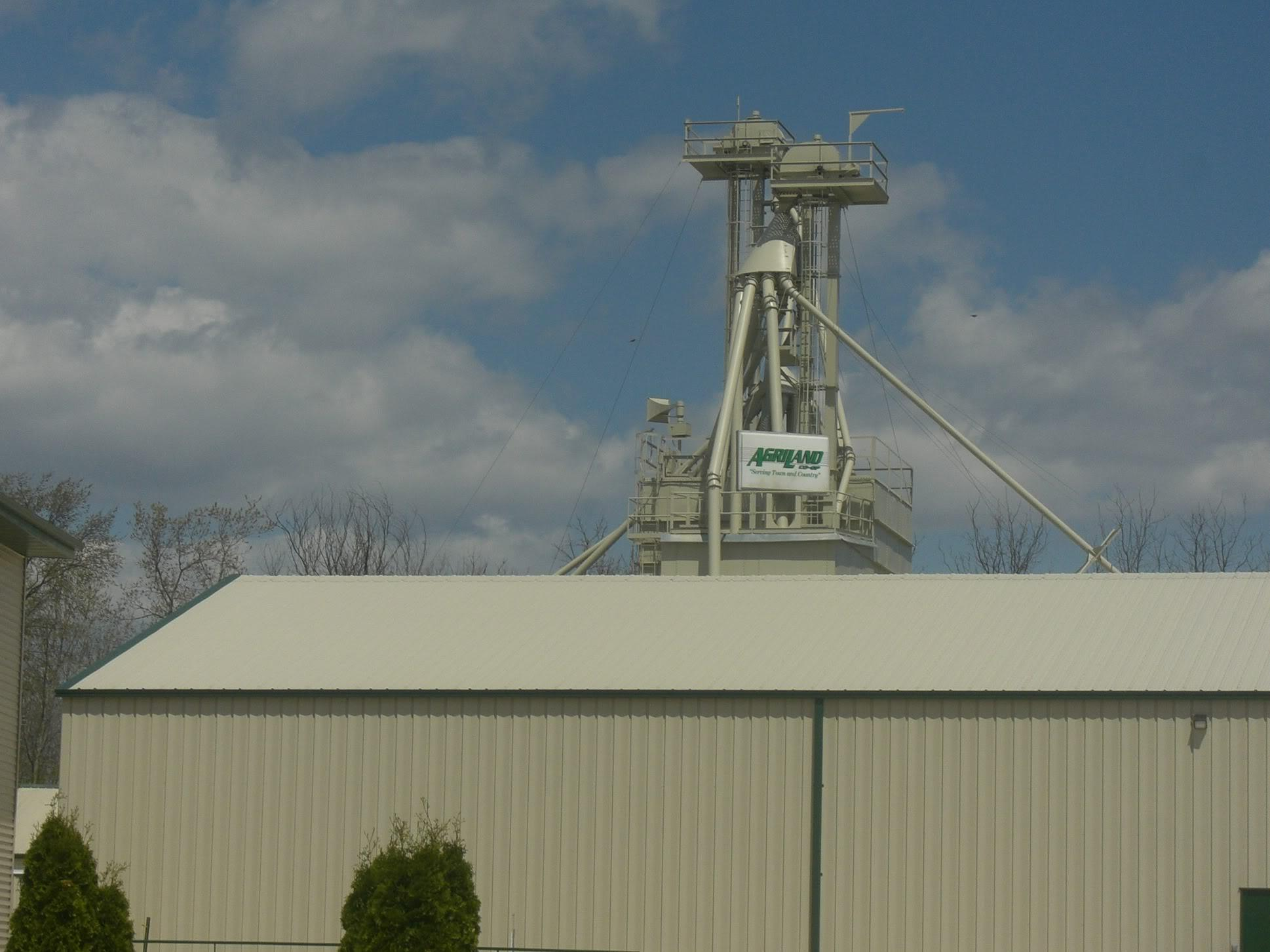
The grain elevator, near the center of the town.

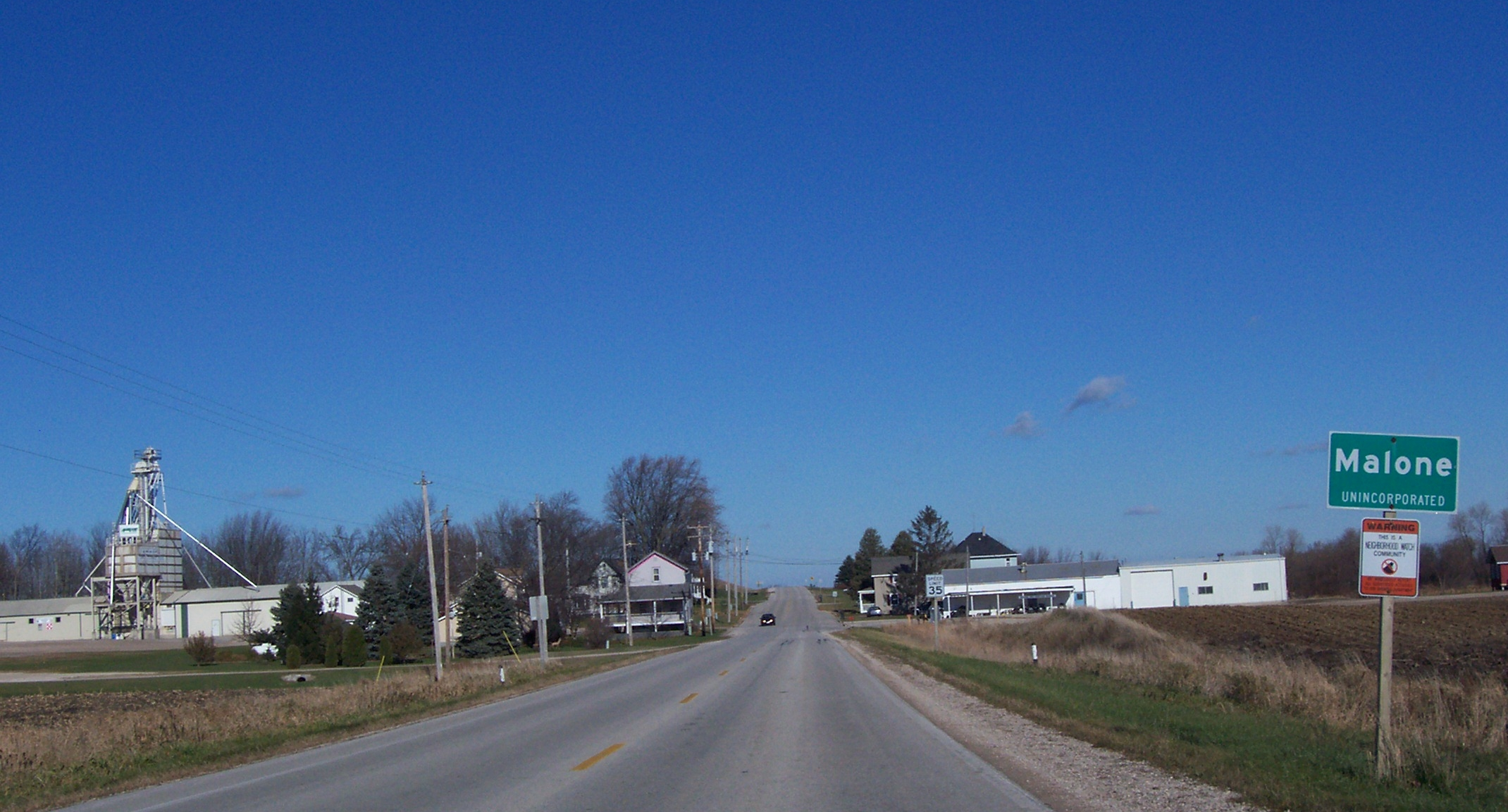
Looking north at Malone
