= Fred Konz =

American politician and businessman

Frederick Konz (August 5, 1841 – ?) was an American farmer, manufacturer and insurance company office from Calvary, Wisconsin who served a single term as a member of the 1881 session of the Wisconsin House of Representatives.

== Background ==
Konz was born in the Kingdom of Prussia on the 5th of August, 1841, son of Mathias and Helena Konz. The Konz family came to Wisconsin in 1847 and eventually settled in Calvary, a community in the Town of Marshfield in Fond du Lac County. Frederick received a common school education, leaving school in 1855 to go to Green Bay, where he trained as a blacksmith. He was joined in Green Bay by his older brother John, who studied wagon-making. Fred returned to Calvary in 1860, and became a farmer. In 1862, he and John founded Konz Brothers, a wagon and general repair shop, where they repaired and manufactured buggies and wagons. In 1876 Fred became president of the Marshfield Mutual Fire Insurance Company, of which he was a co-founder.

On November 25, 1869 Fred married Mary Wolf, daughter of Ludwig and Anna K. Wolf (her sister Gertrude had married John Konz five years earlier). As of 1880, they had had nine children.

== Public office ==
Konz held various local offices, and in 1876 became chairman of the town board. A Democrat, Konz was elected in 1880 to succeed fellow Democrat Ignatius Klotz (who was not a candidate) as assemblyman for the 4th Fond du Lac County district (the towns of Ashford, Auburn, Calumet, Eden, Forest, Marshfield, Osceola and Taycheedah), receiving a vote of 1881, to 543 votes for Republican William Hausman and 79 votes for Greenbacker J. W. Hale. He was assigned to the standing committee on privileges and elections. He was not a candidate for re-election, and was succeeded by another Democrat, Louis Eidemiller. In 1884, he was elected as county sheriff.
