= Sheboygan River =

River in Wisconsin, United States

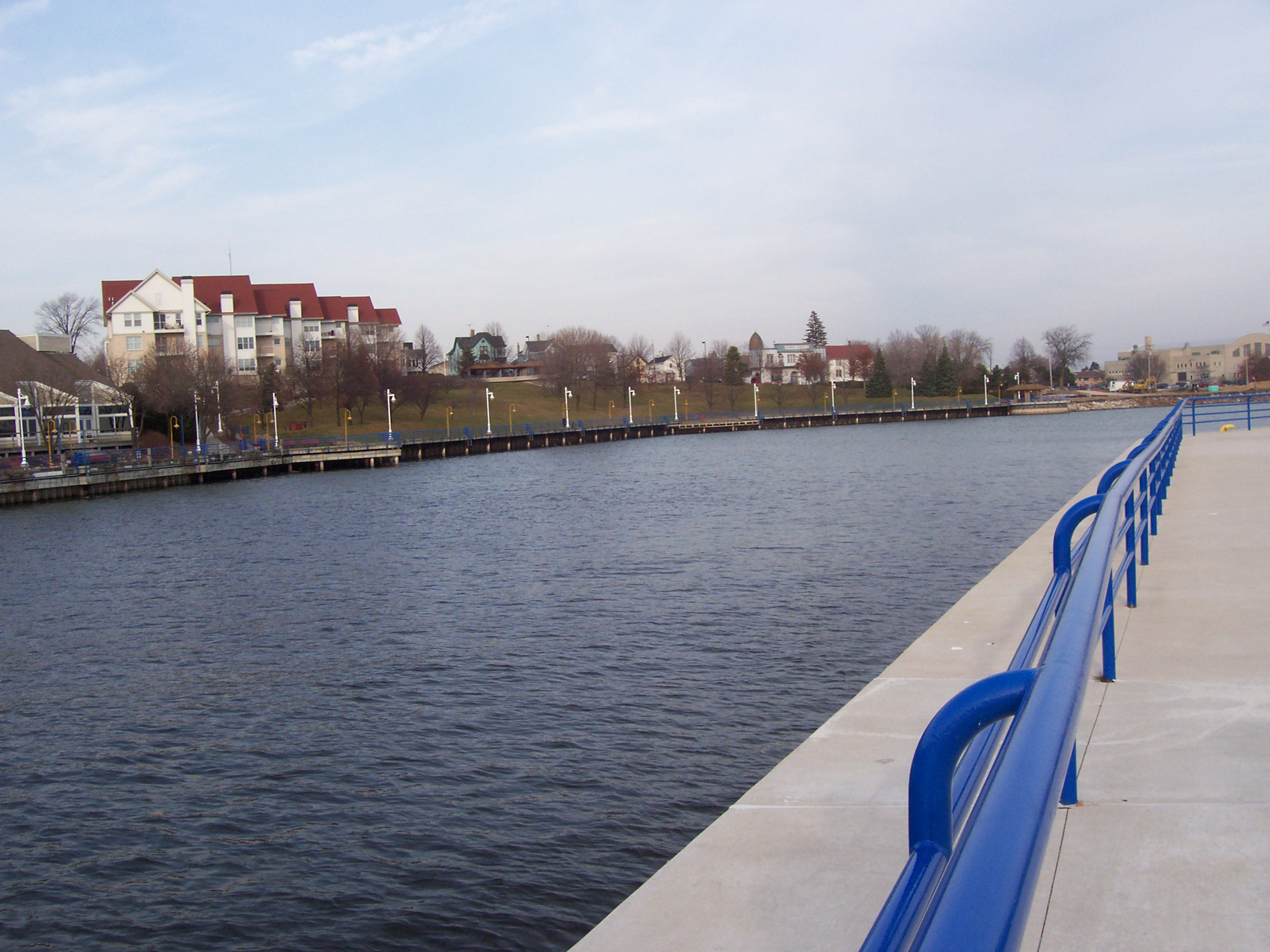
- Riverfront in downtown Sheboygan near the river's mouth

- Location within Wisconsin

Location
- Counties: Fond du Lac; Sheboygan; Calumet; Manitowoc
- Cities: Eden; Dundee; St. Peter; St. Cloud; Elkhart Lake; Kiel; Sheboygan Falls

Physical characteristics
- Source
  - coordinates: 43.7097152°N 88.267878°W
- Mouth: Lake Michigan
  - coordinates: 43.74888°N 87.70314°W
- Length: 81 mi (130 km)

Map

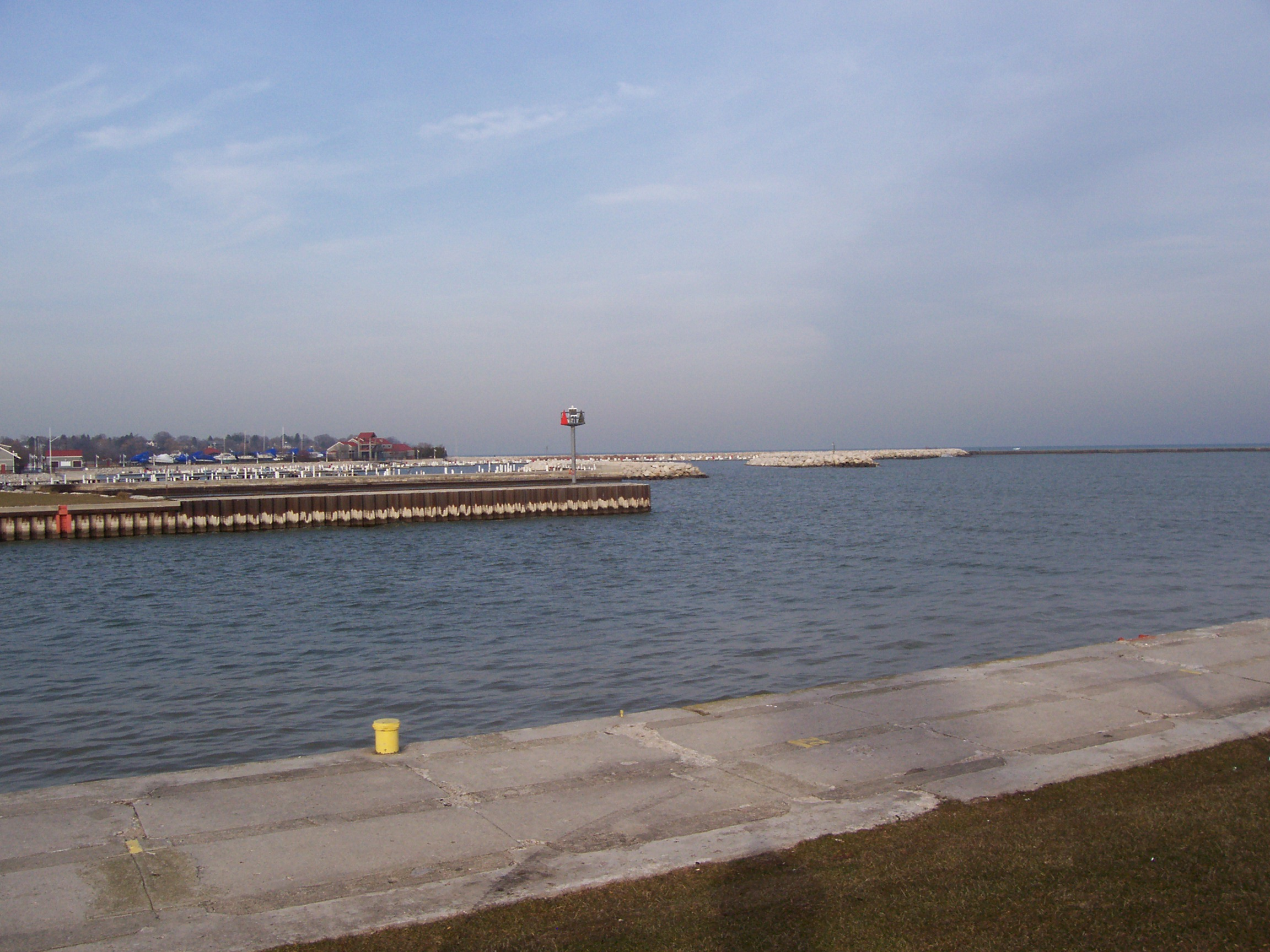
The mouth of the Sheboygan River into Lake Michigan

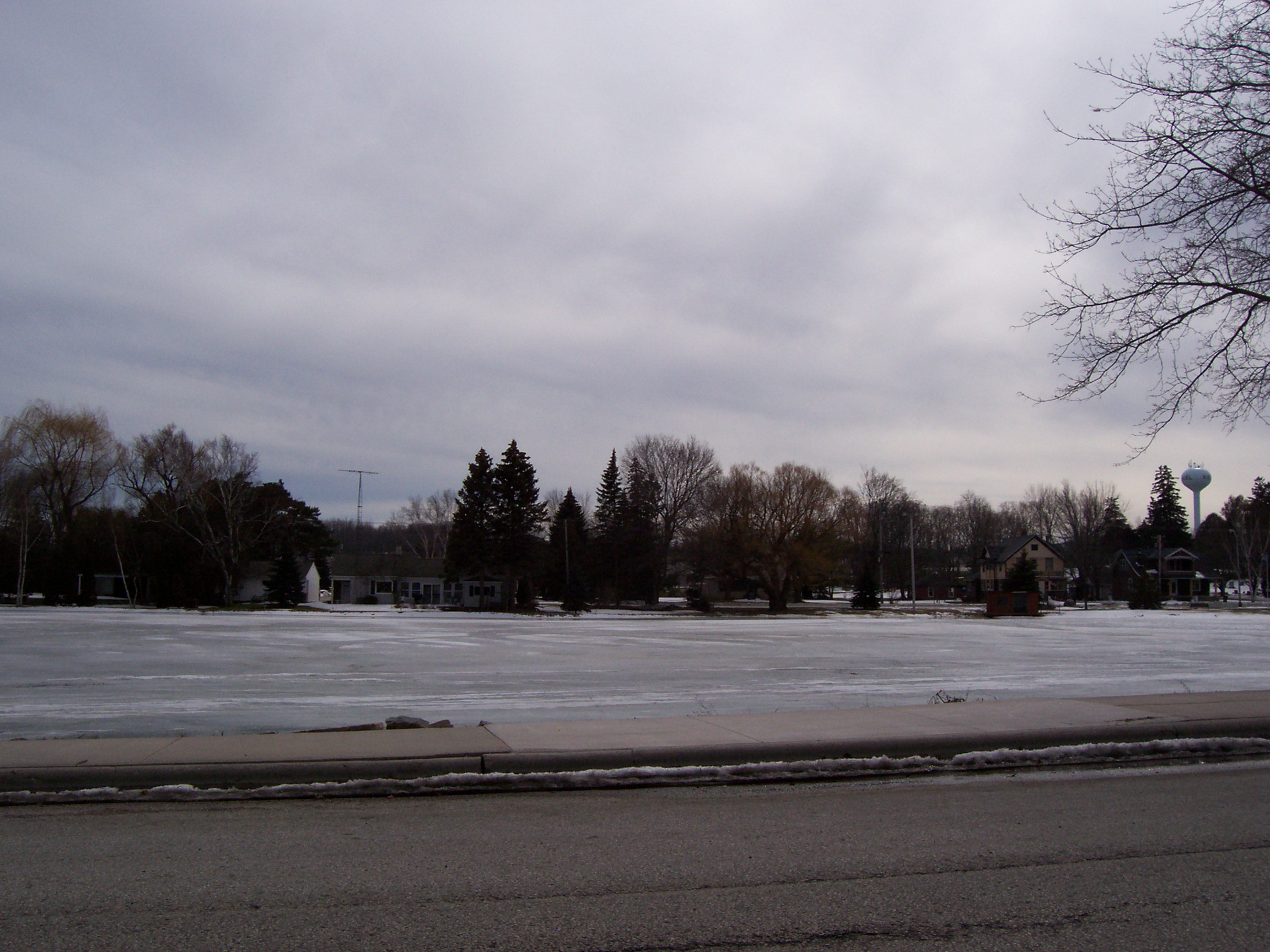
The frozen Sheboygan River in Kiel

The Sheboygan River is a river flowing to Lake Michigan in eastern Wisconsin in the United States. It is about 81 mi (130 km) long and enters the lake at the city of Sheboygan. The name of the river is Chippewa in origin, Shawb-wa-way-gun, meaning 'hollow bone', 'noise underground' or 'river disappearing underground'.

== Course ==
The Sheboygan River rises in eastern Fond du Lac County and initially flows northeastwardly through northwestern Sheboygan County, southeastern Calumet County and southwestern Manitowoc County before turning southeastwardly back into Sheboygan County. Along its course the river flows past the village of St. Cloud, the cities of Kiel and Sheboygan Falls, the village of Kohler and the city of Sheboygan, where it enters Lake Michigan. At Sheboygan Falls it collects its two largest tributaries, the Mullet River and the Onion River.

== Water quality ==
Because of past heavy manufacturing on the eastern portion of the river from companies such as Tecumseh Products in Sheboygan Falls, Kohler Company, and the predecessor companies of Wisconsin Public Service near Sheboygan's downtown, the riverbed has a high concentration of PCBs and other chemicals which make any form of swimming in the river east of Sheboygan Falls' western limits impossible, thus it has been a working Superfund site from the Sheboygan Falls Dam (approximately at Monroe Street in that city eastward) since June 1986. Dredging along the section most affected by Tecumseh was completed in 2005, while dredging of the former Camp Marina/WPS site in Sheboygan was completed by the summer of 2012. Cautions on fishing and warnings about consumption of fish in the Sheboygan River east of the Falls Dam are also enforced by the Wisconsin Department of Natural Resources, and posted at all boat launches along Sheboygan's river frontage.

== See also ==
- List of Wisconsin rivers
