= St. Joe, Wisconsin =

- Unincorporated community
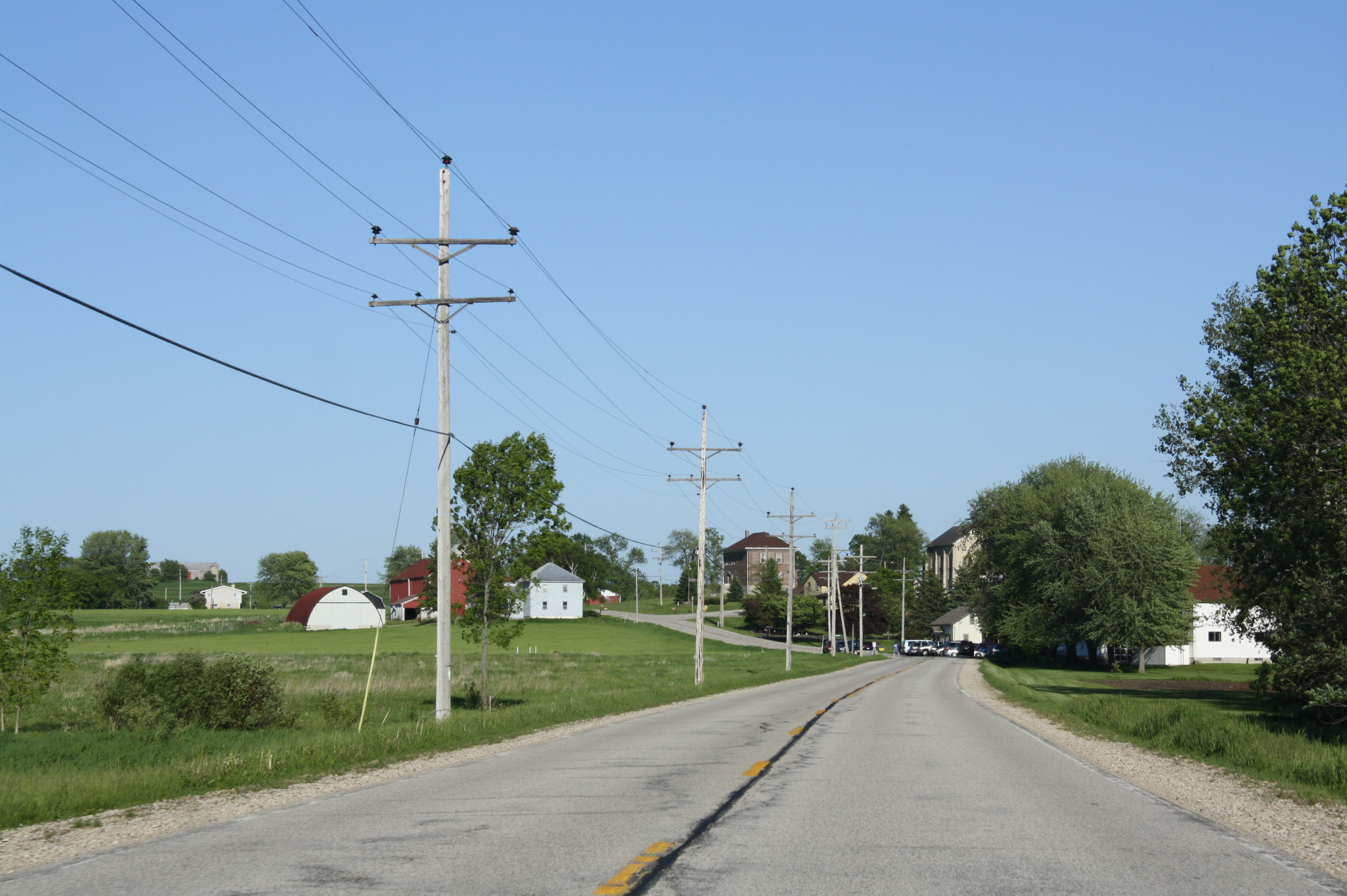
- Looking east towards St. Joe, Wisconsin

- Location within Wisconsin Location within the United States
- Coordinates: 43°51′15″N 88°11′21″W
- Country: United States
- State: Wisconsin
- County: Fond du Lac
- Elevation: 948 ft (289 m)
- Time zone: UTC-6 (Central (CST))
  - Summer (DST): UTC-5 (CDT)
- Zip codes: 53079
- Area code: 920
- GNIS feature ID

St. Joe is an unincorporated community in the town of Marshfield in Fond du Lac County, Wisconsin, United States. The community is located on County Highway G in the northeastern portion of the county, 2.5 miles (4.0 km) northwest of St. Cloud and 3.5 miles (5.6 km) northeast of Mount Calvary. It is considered part of the Holyland.

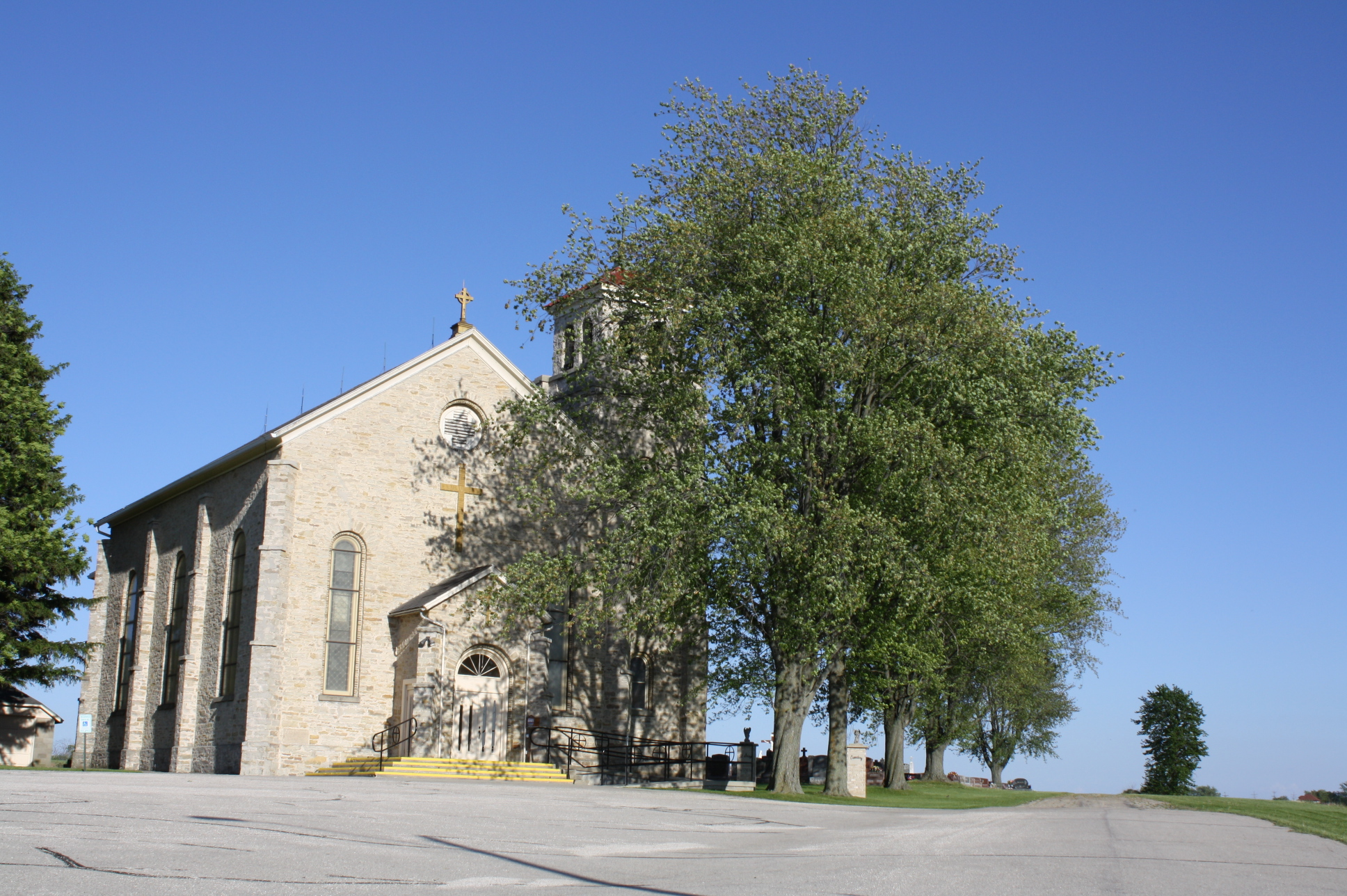
The Roman Catholic church in St. Joe

The first settlers came to the area from nearby Johnsburg in 1847. A Catholic parish was soon formed in the area, and mass was first held in a log cabin church in 1860. The present-day stone St. Joseph's Church was built in 1870. A creamery used to be in the area.
