= St. Cloud, Wisconsin =

- Village
- Location of St. Cloud in Fond du Lac County, Wisconsin.
- Coordinates: 43°49′N 88°10′W
- Country: United States
- State: Wisconsin
- County: Fond du Lac

Area
  - Total: 0.94 sq mi (2.43 km^{2})
  - Land: 0.92 sq mi (2.38 km^{2})
  - Water: 0.015 sq mi (0.04 km^{2})
- Elevation: 932 ft (284 m)

Population (2020)
  - Total: 489
  - Density: 506.2/sq mi (195.46/km^{2})
- Time zone: UTC-6 (Central (CST))
  - Summer (DST): UTC-5 (CDT)
- Area code: 920
- FIPS code: 55-70500
- GNIS feature ID: 1572903
- Website: stcloudwi.gov

St. Cloud is a village in Fond du Lac County, Wisconsin, United States, along the Sheboygan River. The population was 489 at the 2020 census. St. Cloud is part of The Holyland region in northeastern Fond du Lac County.

== History ==
A post office called St. Cloud has been in operation since 1867. The village was named after Saint-Cloud, France.

== Geography ==
St. Cloud is located at 43°49′N 88°10′W (43.822, -88.167), in the Town of Marshfield (§25 T16N R19E).

According to the United States Census Bureau, the village has an area of 0.94 square miles (2.43 km^{2}), of which 0.92 square miles (2.38 km^{2}) is land and 0.02 square miles (0.05 km^{2}) is water.

== Demographics ==
Historical population
| Census | Pop. | Note | %± |
|---|---|---|---|
| 1880 | 183 | | — |
| 1910 | 309 | | — |
| 1920 | 367 | | 18.8% |
| 1930 | 365 | | −0.5% |
| 1940 | 353 | | −3.3% |
| 1950 | 408 | | 15.6% |
| 1960 | 530 | | 29.9% |
| 1970 | 550 | | 3.8% |
| 1980 | 560 | | 1.8% |
| 1990 | 494 | | −11.8% |
| 2000 | 497 | | 0.6% |
| 2010 | 477 | | −4.0% |
| 2020 | 489 | | 2.5% |
U.S. Decennial Census

=== 2020 census ===
As of the census of 2020, there were 489 people, and 183 households in the village. The population density was 531.5 inhabitants per square mile (205.2/km^{2}). There were 223 housing units at an average density of 242.4 per square mile (93.6/km^{2}). The racial makeup of the village was 98.8% White, 0.2% Black or African American, 0.2% Native American, 0.0% Asian, 0.2% from other races, and 0.6% from two or more races. Hispanic or Latino of any race were 1.8% of the population.

=== 2010 census ===
As of the census of 2010, there were 477 people, 208 households, and 143 families living in the village. The population density was 518.5 inhabitants per square mile (200.2/km^{2}). There were 216 housing units at an average density of 234.8 per square mile (90.7/km^{2}). The racial makeup of the village was 96.9% White, 0.6% Native American, 0.4% Asian, 1.5% from other races, and 0.6% from two or more races. Hispanic or Latino of any race were 2.7% of the population.

There were 208 households, of which 26.0% had children under the age of 18 living with them, 58.7% were married couples living together, 5.8% had a female householder with no husband present, 4.3% had a male householder with no wife present, and 31.3% were non-families. 26.9% of all households were made up of individuals, and 13% had someone living alone who was 65 years of age or older. The average household size was 2.29 and the average family size was 2.76.

The median age in the village was 43.3 years. 20.3% of residents were under the age of 18; 5.1% were between the ages of 18 and 24; 28.5% were from 25 to 44; 29.8% were from 45 to 64; and 16.4% were 65 years of age or older. The gender makeup of the village was 48.6% male and 51.4% female.

=== 2000 census ===
As of the census of 2000, there were 497 people, 184 households, and 130 families living in the village. The population density was 533.9 people per square mile (206.3/km^{2}). There were 193 housing units at an average density of 207.3 per square mile (80.1/km^{2}). The racial makeup of the village was 99.60% White, 0.20% Native American, 0.20% from other races. Hispanic or Latino of any race were 0.80% of the population.

There were 184 households, out of which 34.8% had children under the age of 18 living with them, 63.6% were married couples living together, 4.9% had a female householder with no husband present, and 29.3% were non-families. 22.3% of all households were made up of individuals, and 13.0% had someone living alone who was 65 years of age or older. The average household size was 2.70 and the average family size was 3.25.

In the village, the population was spread out, with 27.0% under the age of 18, 9.5% from 18 to 24, 29.0% from 25 to 44, 19.3% from 45 to 64, and 15.3% who were 65 years of age or older. The median age was 36 years. For every 100 females, there were 91.2 males. For every 100 females age 18 and over, there were 97.3 males.

The median income for a household in the village was $51,964, and the median income for a family was $56,625. Males had a median income of $36,563 versus $21,618 for females. The per capita income for the village was $20,539. About 2.4% of families and 4.5% of the population were below the poverty line, including 3.1% of those under age 18 and 7.5% of those age 65 or over.

== Notable people ==
- Ty Bodden, state representative, lived in St. Cloud
- D. C. Coolidge, state representative, born in St. Cloud
- Robert W. Monk, state senator, lived in St. Cloud

== Images ==
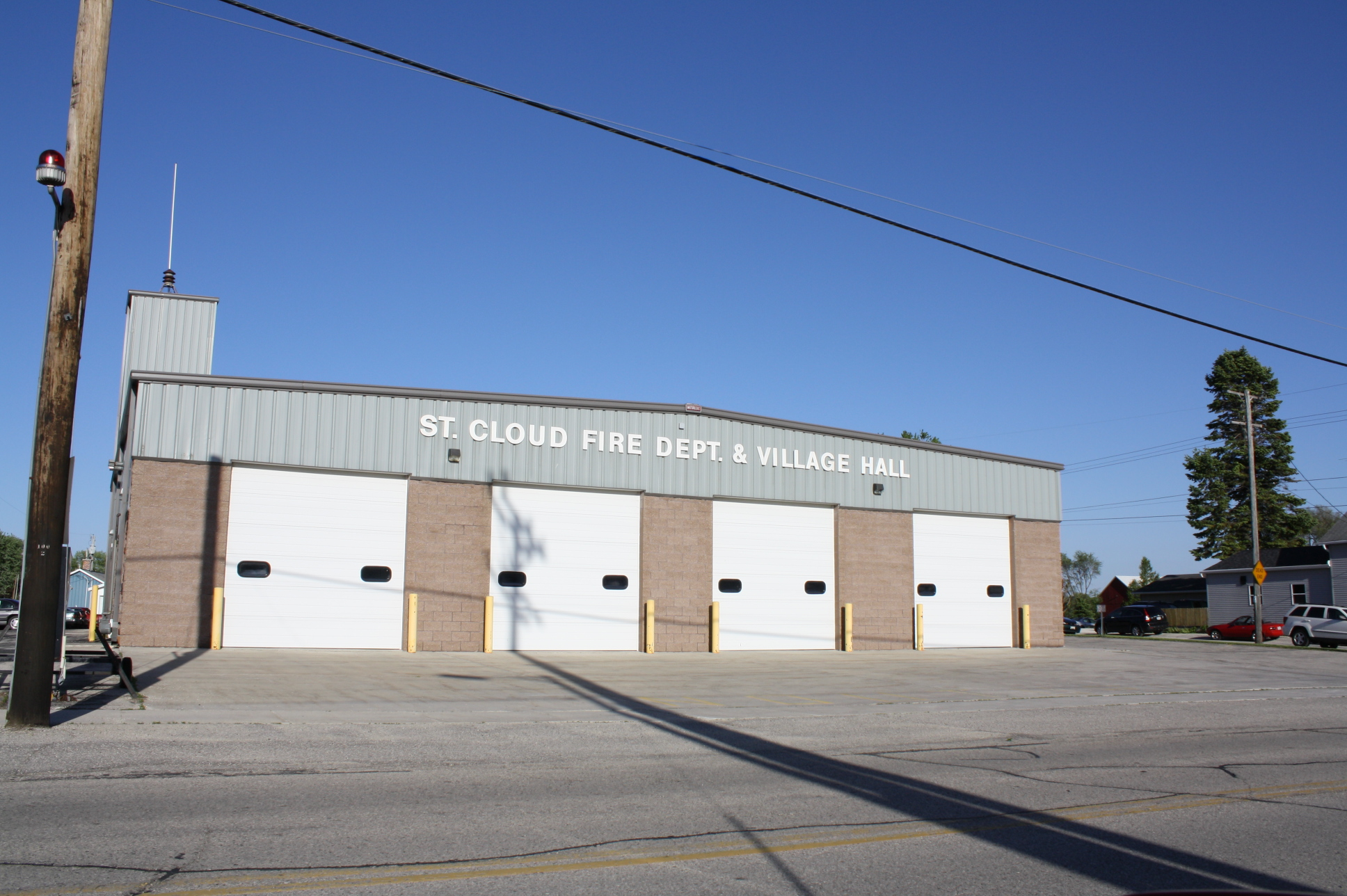
Village hall and fire station

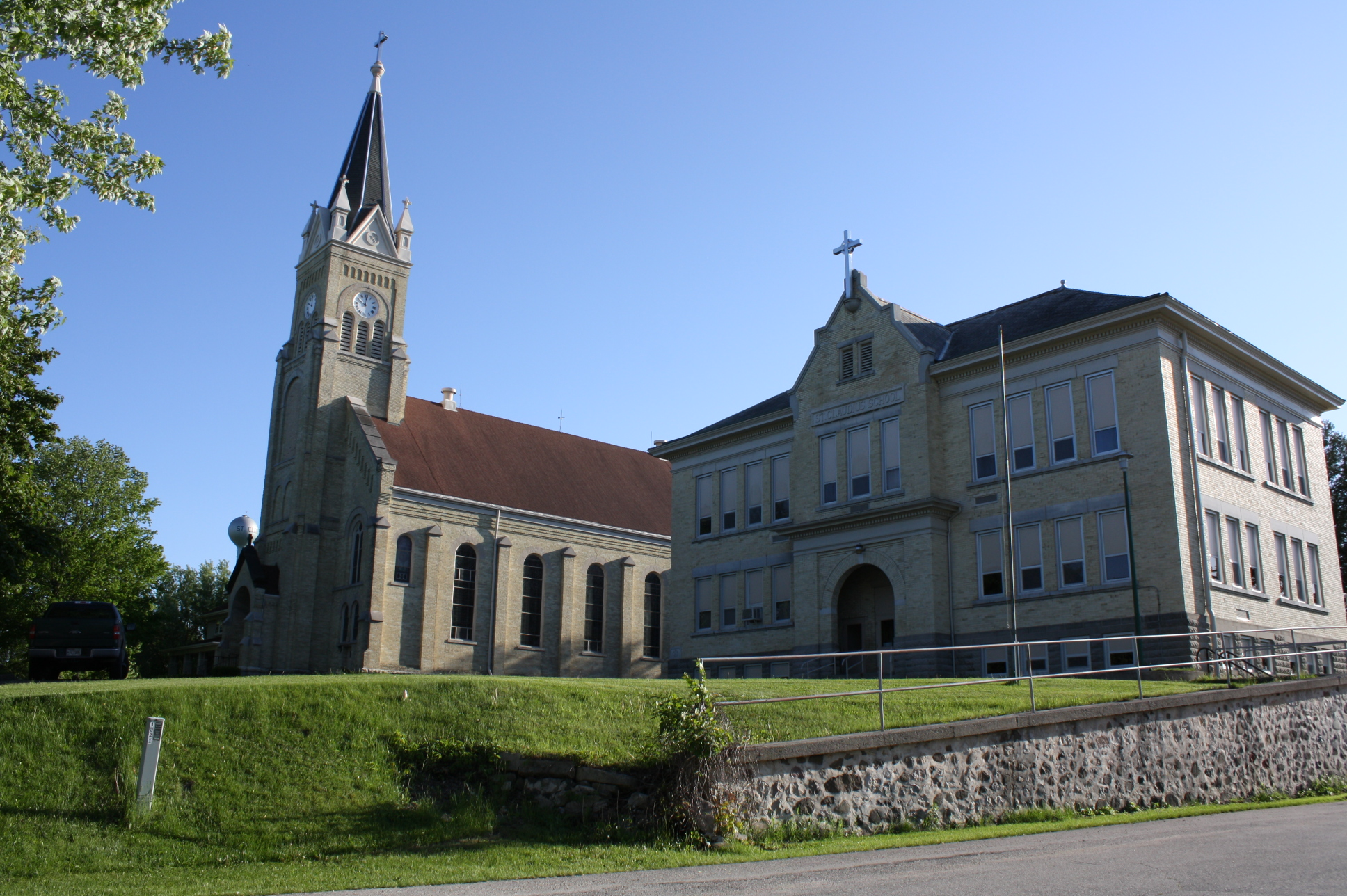
Roman Catholic church

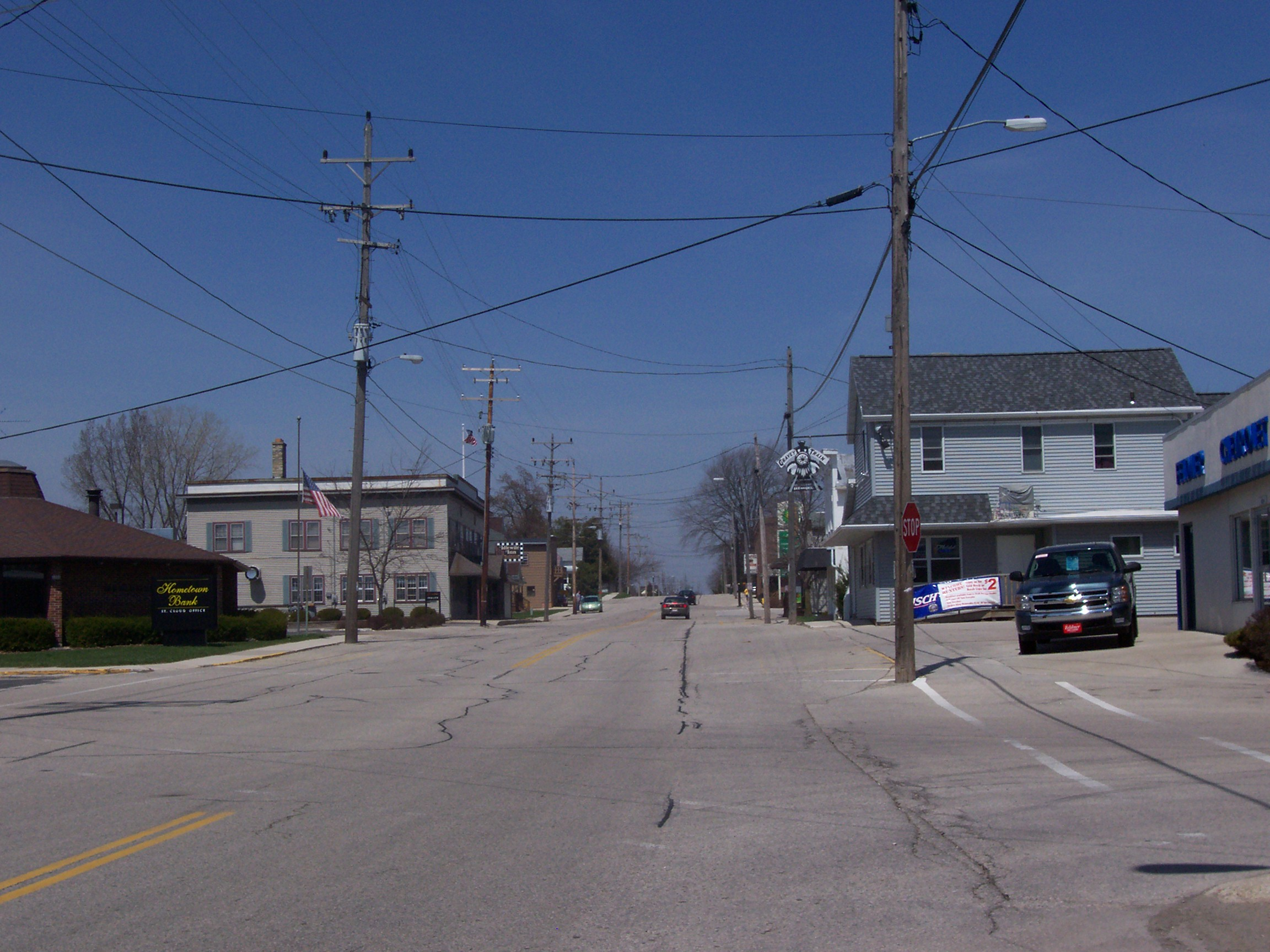
Looking north at downtown St. Cloud

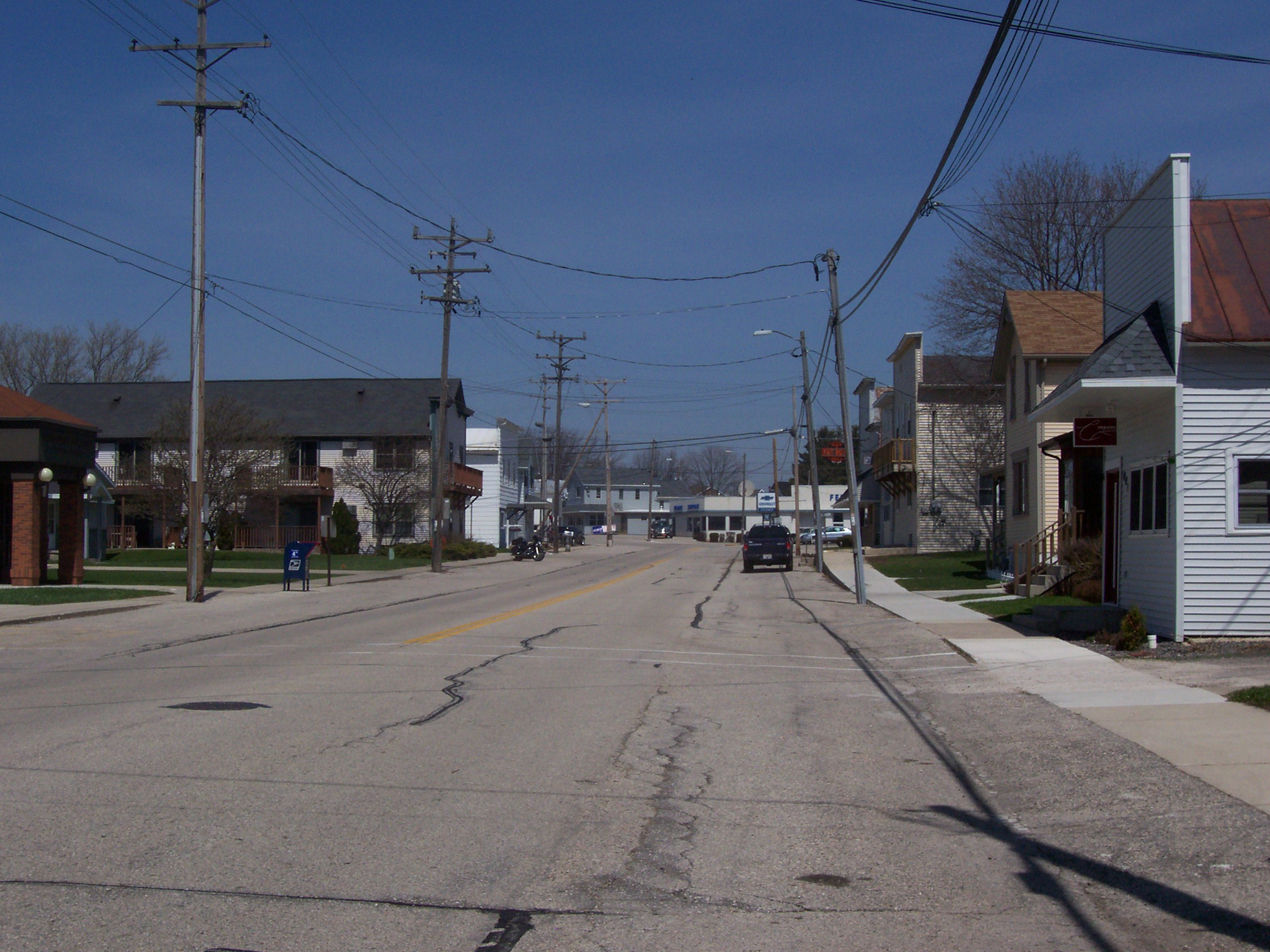
Looking north at downtown St. Cloud

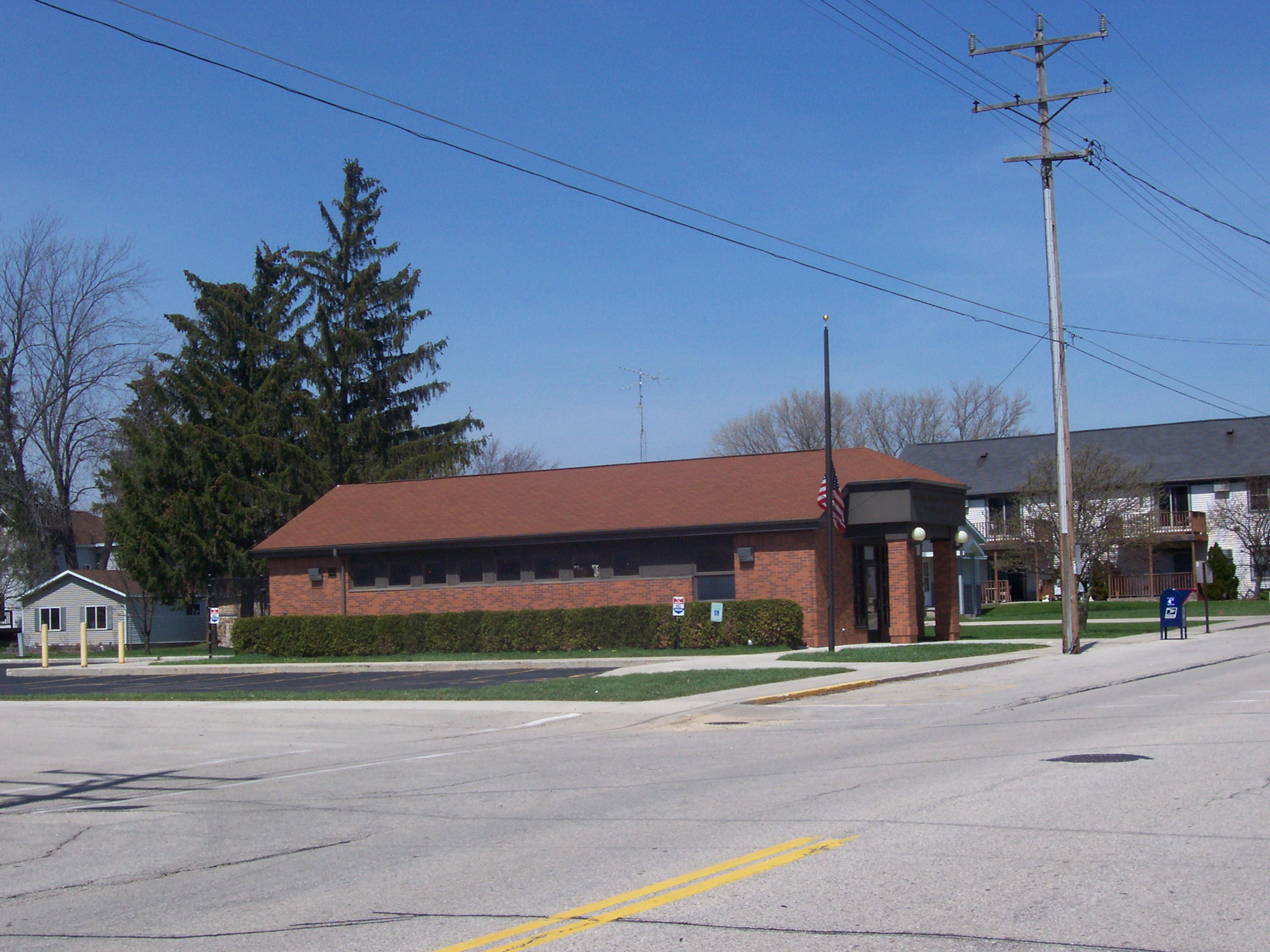
St. Cloud Post Office

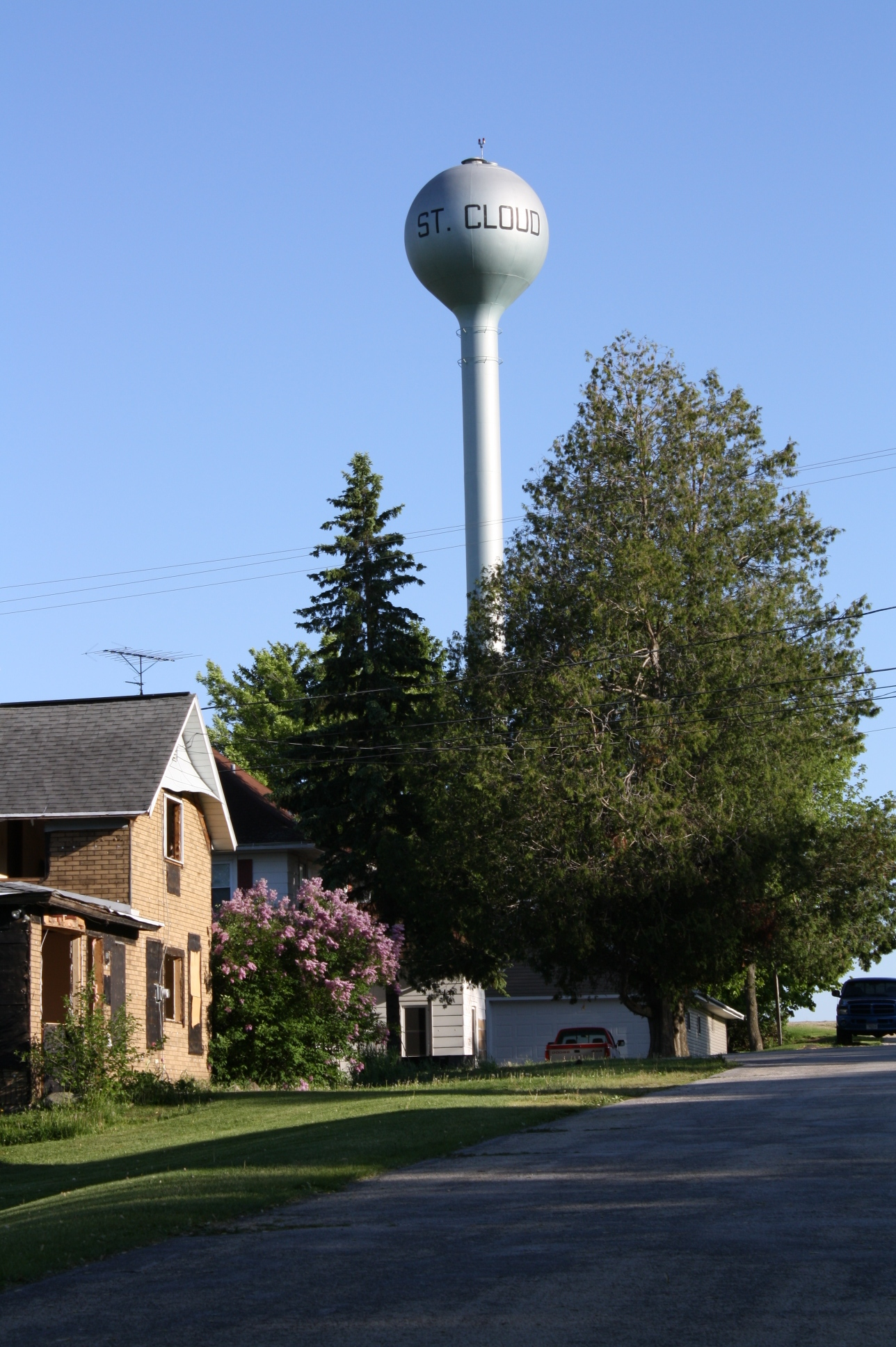
Water tower
