= Marshfield, Fond du Lac County, Wisconsin =

Marshfield, Wisconsin
- Town
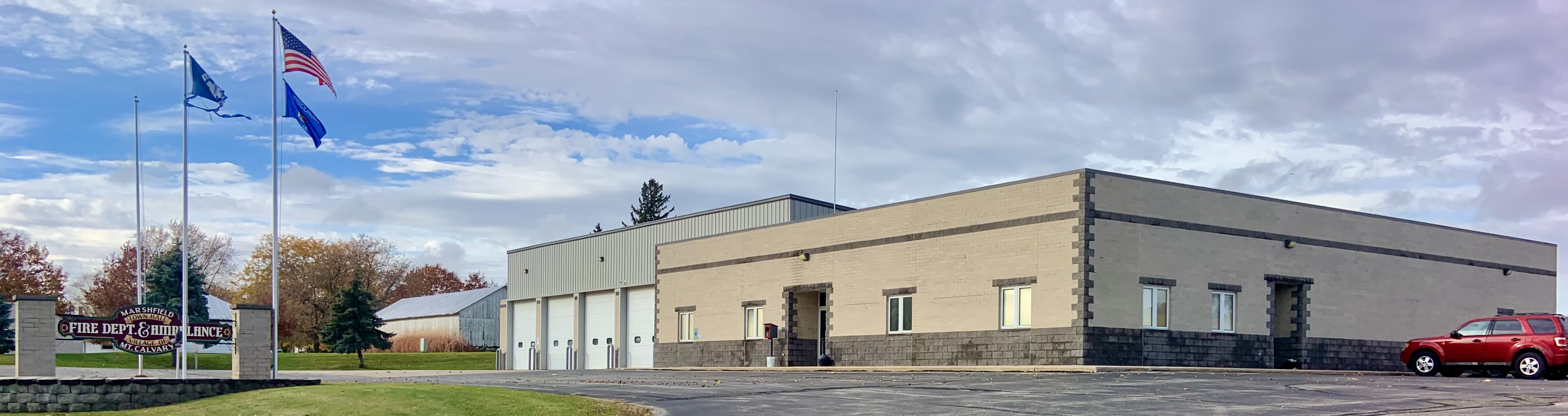
- Town hall

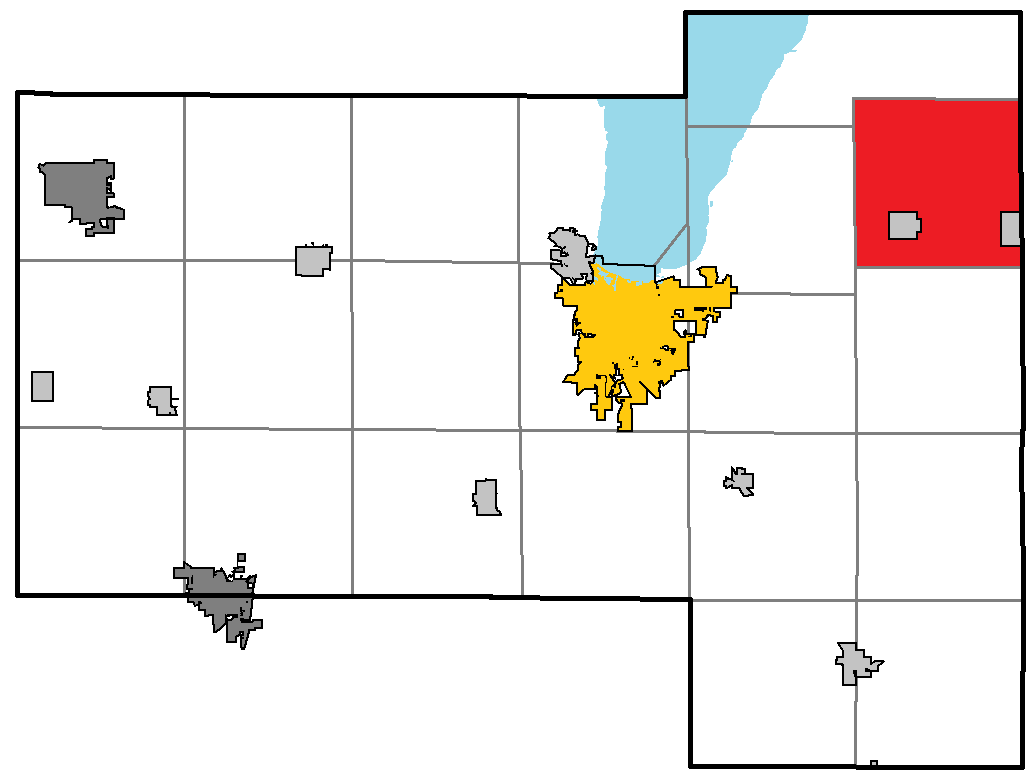
- Location of Marshfield, within Fond du Lac County
- Coordinates: 43°49′56″N 88°13′46″W
- Country: United States
- State: Wisconsin
- County: Fond du Lac

Area
  - Total: 34.3 sq mi (88.9 km^{2})
  - Land: 34.1 sq mi (88.4 km^{2})
  - Water: 0.19 sq mi (0.5 km^{2})
- Elevation: 938 ft (286 m)

Population (2020)
  - Total: 1,123
  - Density: 32.9/sq mi (12.7/km^{2})
- Time zone: UTC-6 (Central (CST))
  - Summer (DST): UTC-5 (CDT)
- Area code: 920
- FIPS code: 55-49650
- GNIS feature ID: 1583665
- Website: townmarshfield.com

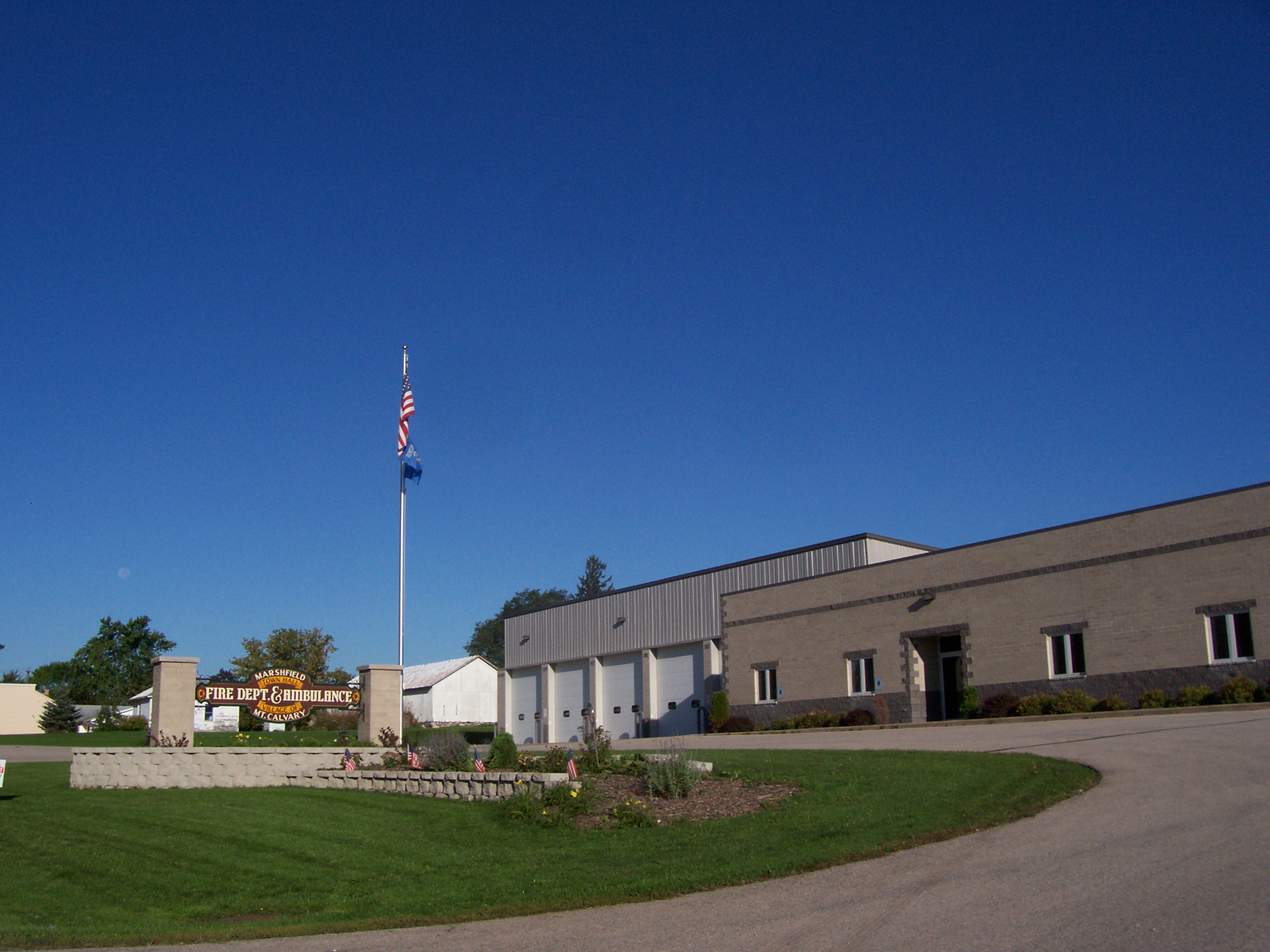
Town hall

Marshfield is a town in Fond du Lac County, Wisconsin, United States. The population was 1,123 at the 2020 census. The unincorporated communities of Calvary and St. Joe are located in the town. The unincorporated community of Malone is also located partially in the town.

== Geography ==
According to the United States Census Bureau, the town has a total area of 34.3 square miles (88.9 km^{2}), of which 34.1 square miles (88.4 km^{2}) is land and 0.2 square mile (0.5 km^{2}) (0.58%) is water.

== Demographics ==
As of the census of 2000, there were 1,118 people, 373 households, and 303 families residing in the town. The population density was 32.8 people per square mile (12.7/km^{2}). There were 437 housing units at an average density of 12.8 per square mile (4.9/km^{2}). The racial makeup of the town was 99.37% White, 0.45% African American and 0.18% Native American. Hispanic or Latino of any race were 0.09% of the population. 71.5% of town of Marshfield residents claimed German ancestry, the most of any community in Wisconsin.

There were 373 households, out of which 38.6% had children under the age of 18 living with them, 78.0% were married couples living together, 1.6% had a female householder with no husband present, and 18.5% were non-families. 16.1% of all households were made up of individuals, and 5.9% had someone living alone who was 65 years of age or older. The average household size was 2.82 and the average family size was 3.19.

In the town, the population was spread out, with 25.6% under the age of 18, 7.6% from 18 to 24, 27.8% from 25 to 44, 24.4% from 45 to 64, and 14.6% who were 65 years of age or older. The median age was 39 years. For every 100 females, there were 101.4 males. For every 100 females age 18 and over, there were 98.6 males.

The median income for a household in the town was $56,250, and the median income for a family was $62,857. Males had a median income of $37,279 versus $25,694 for females. The per capita income for the town was $21,467. About 2.6% of families and 6.3% of the population were below the poverty line, including 3.4% of those under age 18 and 19.4% of those age 65 or over.

== Businesses ==
The Town of Marshfield is the site of the large industrial wind factory installation (wind farm) called the Blue Sky Green Field Wind Farm, along with neighboring Town of Calumet. It was constructed throughout the town in 2007 and it opened in May 2008. This site is being contracted by the energy company supplying electricity in the area, WEC. This siting was the reason for a suit that was filed by some citizens of the locale (a.k.a. Concerned Citizens of Marshfield). This action was dismissed in local circuit court by Judge Peter Grimm. His finding in the case was that there was no nuisance caused by the installation, since the installation had not yet been built. This was partly based upon landmark case law in Wisconsin, the State of WI v Quality Egg.

== Notable people ==
- Frederick Eis, Roman Catholic bishop
- Fred Konz, farmer, blacksmith and politician
- Henry Rollmann, state legislator
- Joseph Wagner, educator and politician
