= Shirley =

Shirley may refer to:

== Arts and entertainment ==
- Shirley (novel), an 1849 novel by Charlotte Brontë
- Shirley (1922 film), a British silent film
- Shirley (2020 film), an American biographical film about Shirley Jackson
- Shirley (2024 film), an American biographical film about Shirley Chisholm
- Shirley (album), a 1961 album by Shirley Bassey
- "Shirley" (song), a 1958 song by John Fred and the Playboys
- Shirley (TV series), a 1979 TV series
- Shirley (manga), a 2003 manga series

== People ==
- Shirley (name), a given name and a surname
- Shirley (Dutch singer) (born 1946), Dutch singer and pianist
- Szhirley (born 1976), Danish singer

== Places ==
=== United Kingdom ===
- Shirley, Derbyshire, England
- Shirley, Hampshire, a hamlet in Sopley parish, New Forest
- Shirley, Southampton, a district of Southampton, Hampshire
- Shirley, London, in Croydon
- Shirley, West Midlands, England

=== United States ===
- Shirley, Arkansas
- Shirley, Illinois
- Shirley, Indiana
- Shirley, Maine
- Shirley, Massachusetts, a New England town
  - Shirley (CDP), Massachusetts, the main village in the town
- Shirley, Minnesota
- Shirley, Missouri
- Shirley, New York, a hamlet in Suffolk County
- Shirley, Erie County, New York, a hamlet
- Shirley Plantation, an estate in Virginia
- Shirley, West Virginia
- Shirley, Wisconsin

=== Elsewhere ===
- Shirley, British Columbia, Canada
- Shirley, New Zealand, a suburb of Christchurch
- Shirley Island, Antarctica
- Shirleys Bay, in the Ottawa River, Ontario, Canada

== Transportation ==
- Shirley railway station (England), in Shirley, West Midlands, England
- Shirley station (MBTA), in Shirley, Massachusetts, US
- Shirley, a California station on the Atchison, Topeka and Santa Fe Railway Valley Division, US

== Other uses ==
- Shirley (horse), an American Thoroughbred racehorse
- Shirley Institute, a cotton and textile research centre in Manchester
- Shirley Wind, a wind farm in Wisconsin, United States
- Shirley, a fictional character from the animated series Shaun the Sheep

== See also ==
- Shirley & Company, a 1970s disco group
- Shirley's World, a 1971 sitcom
- Skirlaugh, East Riding of Yorkshire, which has the same meaning as Shirley
- Upper Shirley (disambiguation)
