= Forward Wind Energy Center =

Wind farm in Wisconsin, US

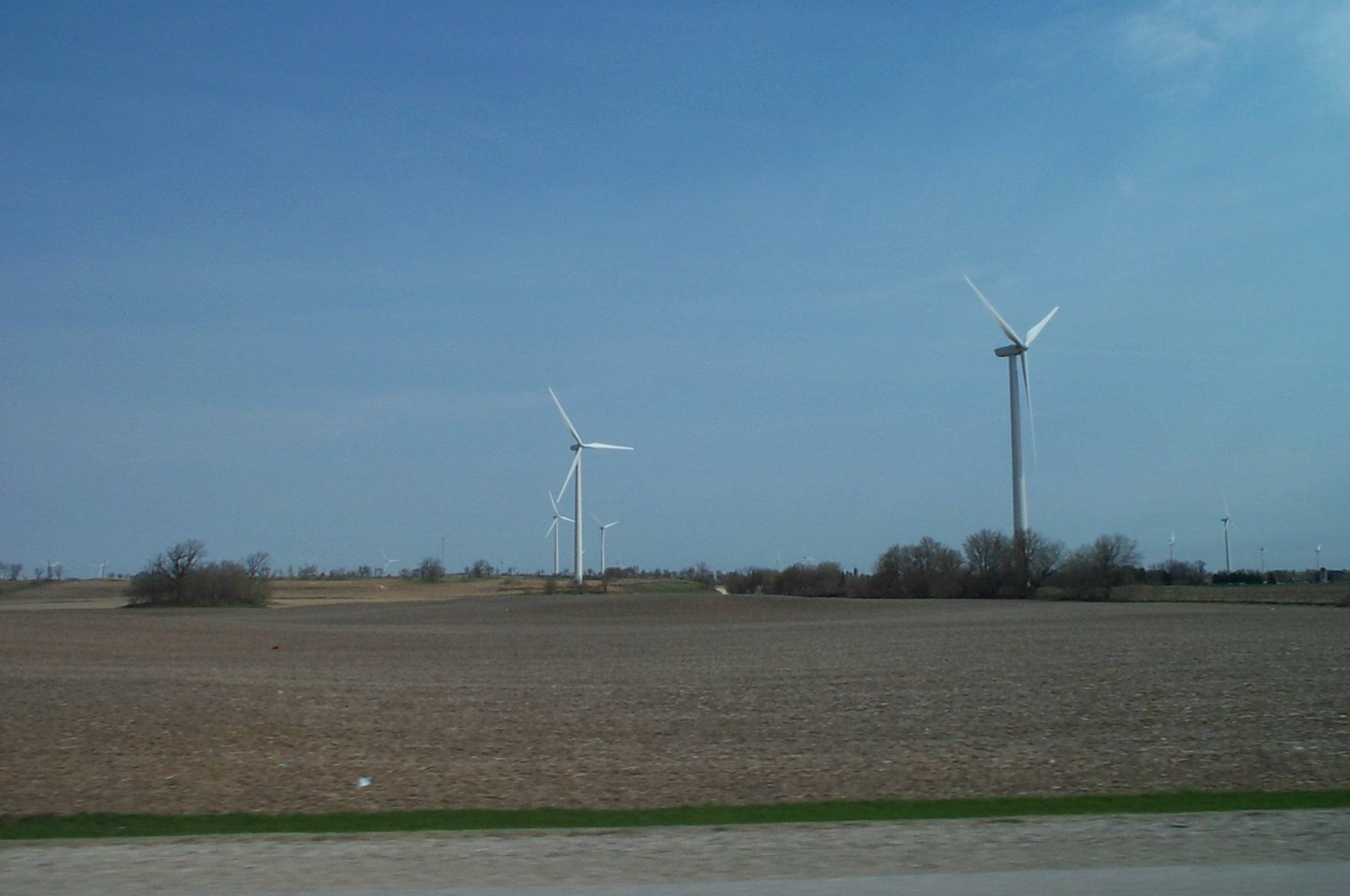
- Forward Wind Energy Center as viewed from Wisconsin Highway 49 near Brownsville, Wisconsin
- Country: United States
- Location: near Brownsville, Wisconsin
- Coordinates: 43°36′58″N 88°30′44″W
- Status: Operational
- Construction began: 2007
- Commission date: 2008
- Owners: Wisconsin Public Service (44.6%); Wisconsin Power & Light (42.6%); Madison Gas and Electric (12.8%)

Wind farm
- Type: Onshore

Power generation
- Units operational: 86 turbines
- Make and model: GE 1.6sle 1.6 MW; GE 1.85sle 1.85 MW
- Nameplate capacity: 137.85 MW
- Capacity factor: 27.7% (average 2009-2017)
- Annual net output: 335 GW·h

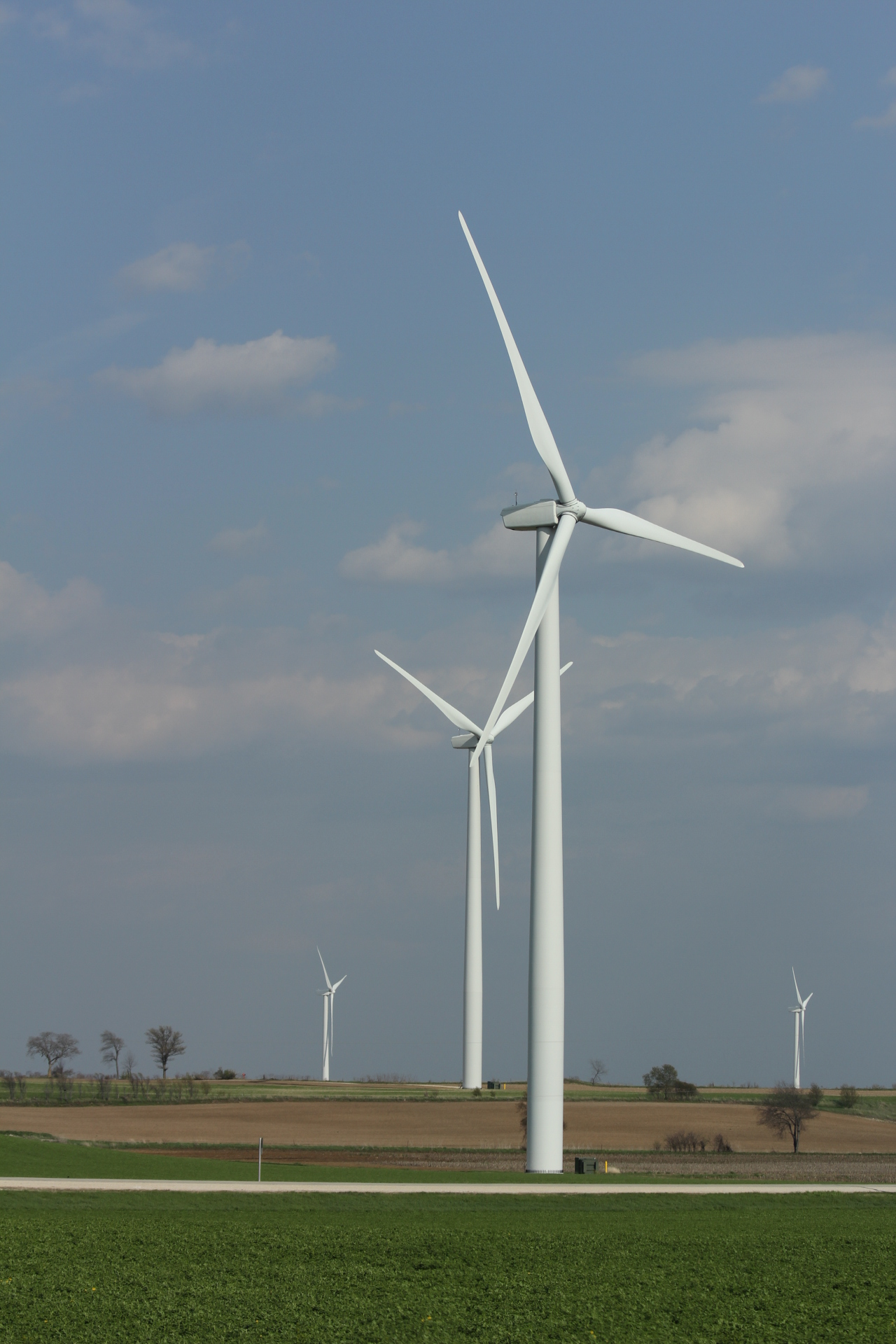
Turbines of the farm, taken in 2014

The Forward Wind Energy Center is a 137.85 megawatt (MW) wind farm in Dodge and Fond du Lac County, Wisconsin near the village of Brownsville. The wind farm sits on approximately 4,000 acres of land. "Forward" is the state's motto. The facility is sited in close proximity to the Horicon National Wildlife Refuge and the Horicon Marsh State Wildlife Area which provide nesting areas for waterfowl and a resting area for large numbers of migratory birds.

The project cost approximately $178 million (2008 purchase price).

== Details ==
The project was developed by Invenergy and initially proposed in 2004 to be a 200 MW facility with 133 wind turbines. The draft environmental impact statement (EIS) was submitted on March 8, 2005. After a 45-day public comment and review period, the final environmental impact statement was submitted on May 18, 2005. The project area contained within the final environmental impact statement project covers 32,400 acres (~50 square miles) with approximately 11,000 acres dedicated to turbine easements. The Public Service Commission of Wisconsin issued a Certificate of Public Convenience and Necessity (CPCN) on July 14, 2005.

Despite perceived initial support, there grew significant controversy in the siting selection related to the wildlife, visual, and other impacts. These led to further environmental studies, offers of additional monetary compensation, organized opposition, and delays due to legal action. Permitting from an Air Route Surveillance Radar facility to the south also slowed the project. The experience led some communities in the region to pass moratoria on further development, some of which have been challenged by state agencies.

The project was eventually approved to begin construction in 2007. Brownsville-based Michels Corporation provided EPC services. Completed in 2008, the downsized facility includes 85 General Electric SLE 1.6 MW wind turbines and a single GE SLE 1.85 MW turbine. It is setback two-miles from the Horicon Marsh located to the west. Two smaller wind farms named "Cedar Ridge" (68 MW) and "Butler Ridge" (45 MW), as well as the 145 MW Blue Sky Green Field Wind Energy Center, came online within about the same year.

Followup information sessions and academic studies on the environmental and cultural impacts of the project have been pursued. Macalester College has documented the controversy surrounding the project and studied its implications. At the invitation of the Friends of the Horicon National Wildlife Refuge in 2010, the conservation chair of the Wisconsin Society for Ornithology further addressed local concerns on the effects of wind turbines on wildlife. A two-year study of bird and bat mortality at the Forward Wind facility was completed by University of Wisconsin researchers for the Public Service Commission of Wisconsin, with a report published in August 2011. Inline with similar studies elsewhere, it showed a relatively larger number of bat fatalities and a lesser number of added bird deaths. Red-tailed hawks represented around 20% of recorded bird fatalities.

== Electricity production ==
Generation (MW-h) of Forward Wind Energy Center and Capacity Factor
Year	Jan	Feb	Mar	Apr	May	Jun	Jul	Aug	Sep	Oct	Nov	Dec	Annual (Total)	Capacity Factor (%)
2008							18,575	13,333	18,027	33,862	33,511	46,205	163,513	26.9
2009	34,436	38,006	37,821	35,367	33,831	17,840	16,093	21,580	9,966	15,300	27,585	19,392	307,217	25.4
2010	34,587	19,660	37,821	41,281	26,208	17,348	18,520	19,204	27,179	29,662	38,227	32,419	342,116	28.3
2011	24,543	38,689	25,887	35,554	38,742	23,830	16,448	12,649	21,547	30,545	39,981	33,519	341,934	28.3
2012	42,554	30,091	41,177	32,129	28,396	27,027	14,483	17,089	23,574	34,800	29,547	30,376	351,243	29.1
2013	43,779	32,517	28,335	40,018	29,839	16,373	15,762	13,700	21,076	26,701	40,854	28,153	337,107	27.9
2014	45,855	36,577	36,233	39,597	25,255	21,338	18,403	12,209	19,408	32,704	37,641	25,819	351,039	29.1
2015	34,718	31,539	35,609	34,547	32,999	15,679	16,588	19,745	20,387	25,345	43,681	38,539	349,376	28.9
2016	30,241	34,728	26,472	31,507	26,695	19,714	17,936	12,369	23,157	25,979	32,063	39,028	319,889	26.5
2017	30,217	32,083	33,675	32,828	27,853	23,566	11,873	10,539	13,476	30,401	33,517	33,211	313,239	25.9
2018	25,726	18,701	21,086	16,830	14,315	9,878	8,263	8,933	10,036	18,110	17,223	18,881	187,982	15.6
2019	36,107	31,364	35,120	38,076	26,802	23,748	15,271	13,265	20,010	30,889	29,518	39,019	339,199	28.1
2020	14188	17126	15196	13035	10887	7806	6175	6775	11854	14673	19740	13667	151,122	
2021	2294	14726	18993	11304	10844	8902	5842	5624	9930	7515	15238	16436	127,648	
2022	12426	14111	15775	18407	13084	10514	7357	5345	8759	14000	13204	16671	149,653	
2023	8775	18398	14058	15982	9721	5740	4873	6824	8546					

== See also ==
- Wind power in Wisconsin
- Electrical Grid Regulation in Wisconsin
- Environmental impact of wind power
- List of wind farms in the United States
- Centennial Wind Farm and Beech Ridge Wind Farm, also Invenergy LLC facilities.
