= Wind power in Wisconsin =

Electricity from wind in one U.S. state

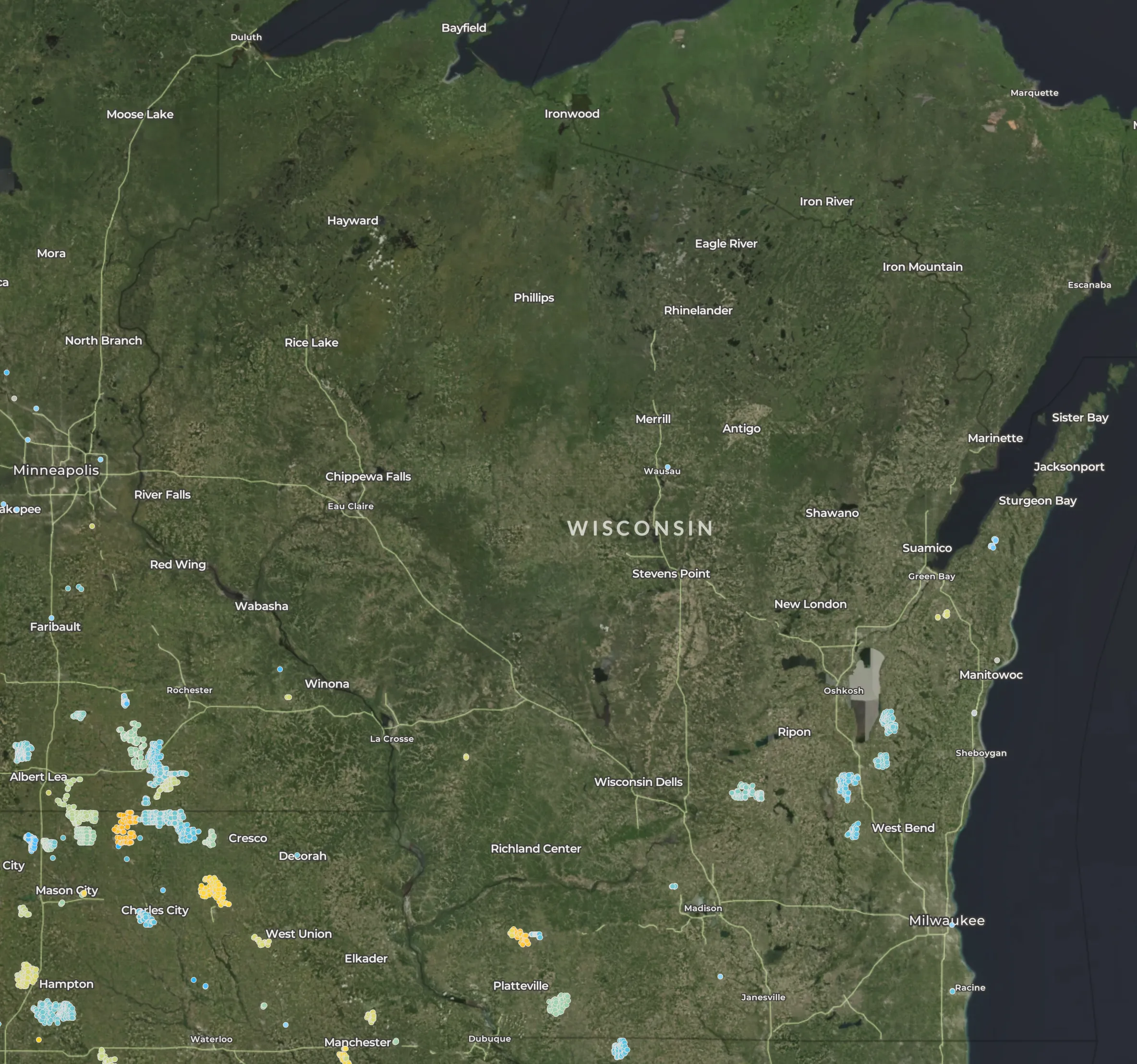
Wisconsin wind power

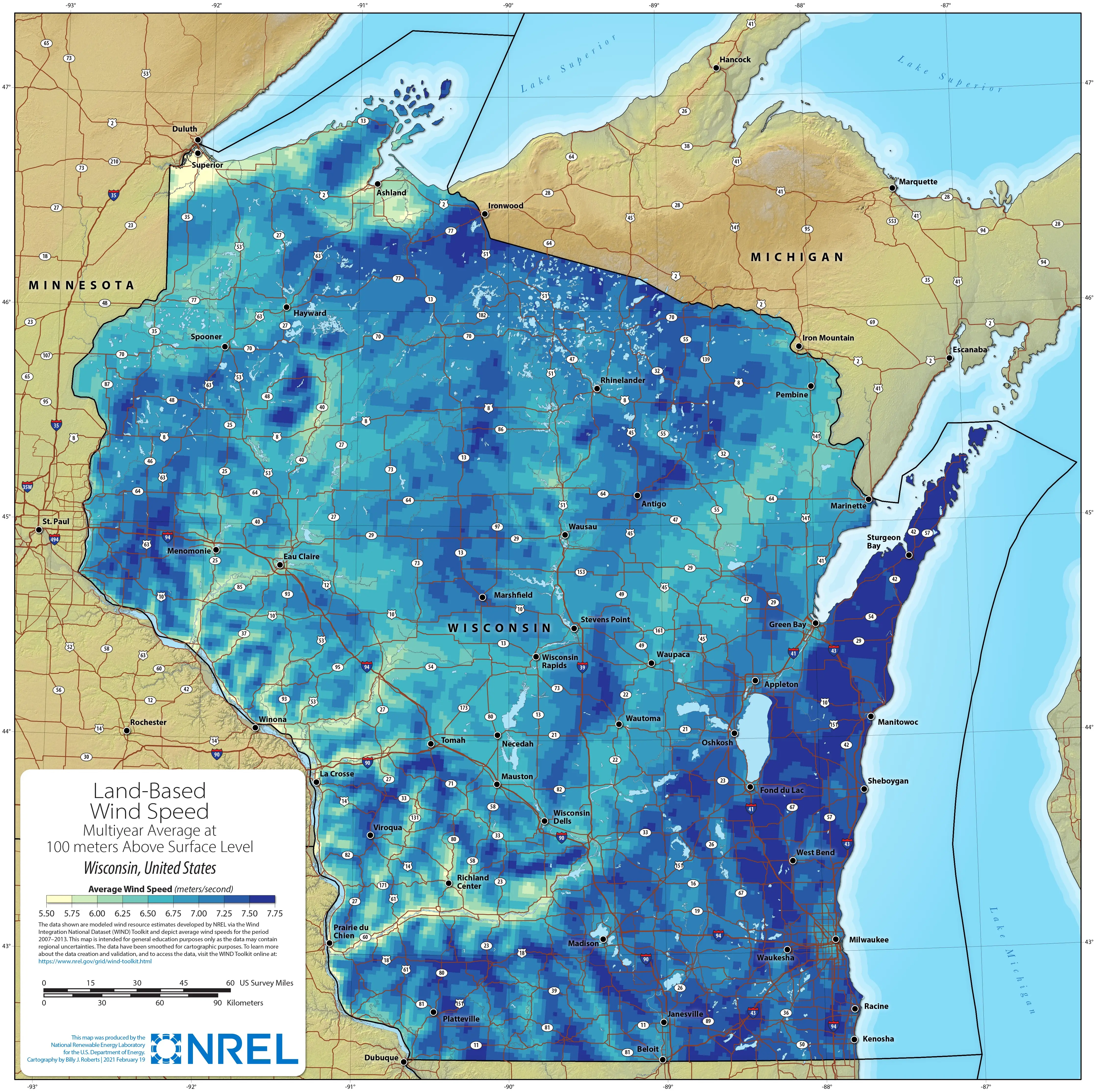
Wisconsin land based wind speed at 100 meters

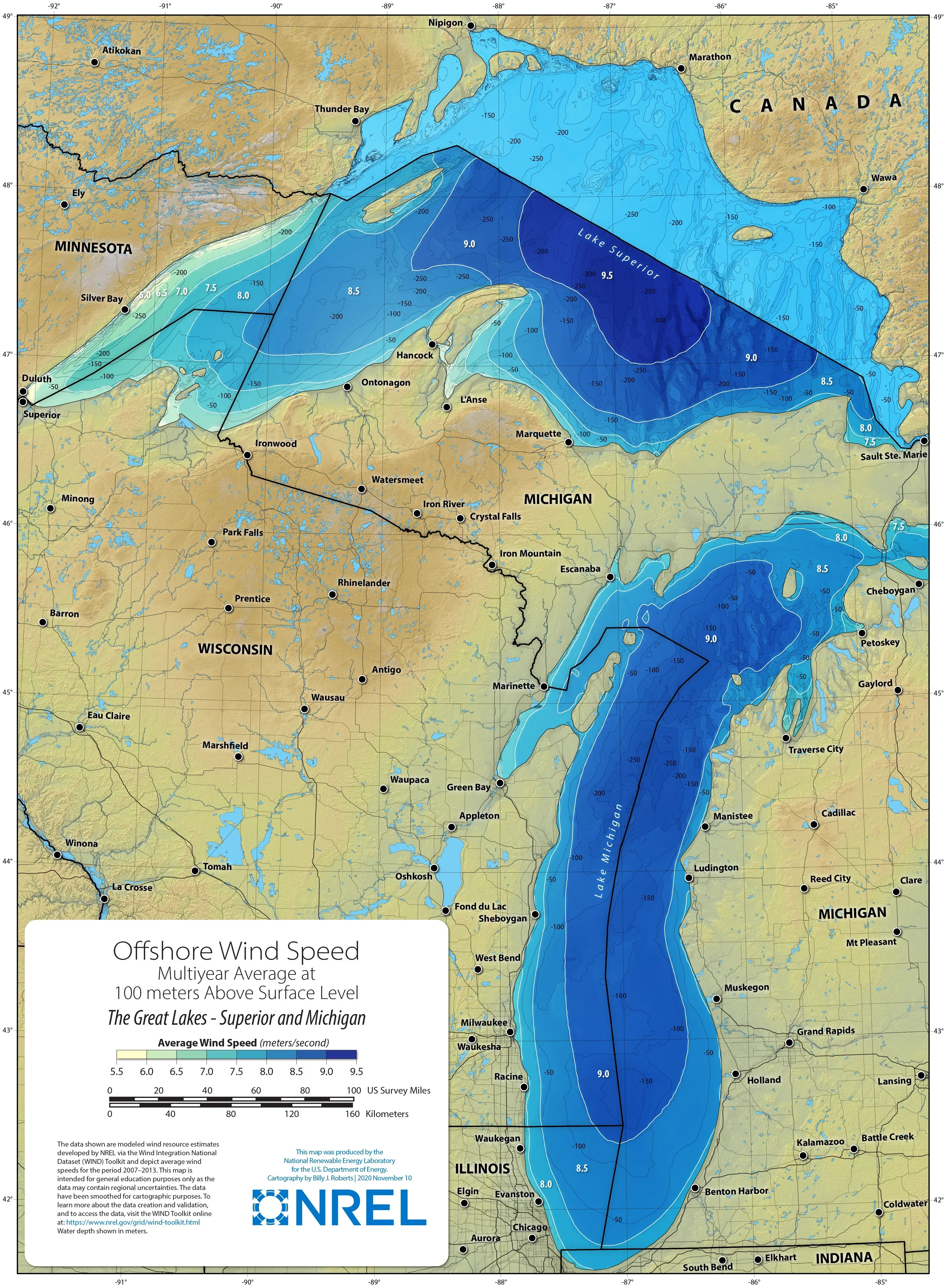
Offshore wind potential for Lake Superior and Lake Michigan

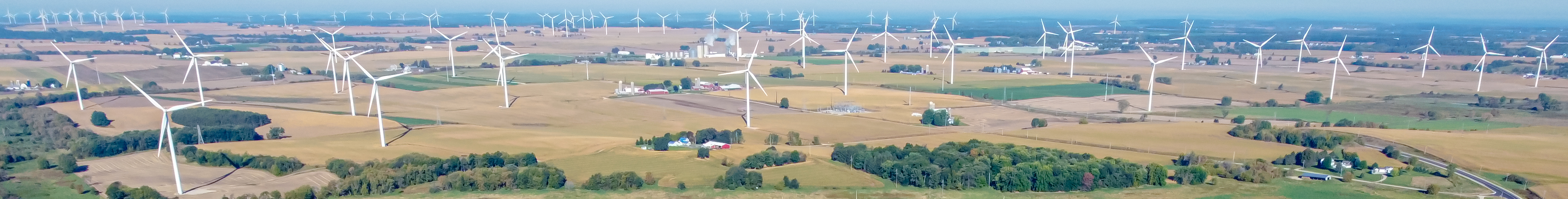
Glacier Hills project in Columbia County

Wind power in Wisconsin started in 1990 with the installation of the Lincoln Turbines wind farm, and contributes to the state's renewable portfolio standard established in 1998. In 2016, Wisconsin had a wind generating capacity of 648 megawatts (MW), responsible for generating 2.4% of its electricity. In 2019, this increased to a capacity of 737 MW, and 2.63% of generation.

Regulations regarding the siting of wind turbines substantially hinder the development of wind farms in the state.

A 98 MW wind farm, the Quilt Block Wind Farm, was under construction in southwest Wisconsin as of February 2017.

== Statistics ==
Wisconsin wind generation capacity by year
Megawatts of installed generating capacity

Wisconsin wind generation (GWh, million kWh)
| Year | Total | Jan | Feb | Mar | Apr | May | Jun | Jul | Aug | Sep | Oct | Nov | Dec |
|---|---|---|---|---|---|---|---|---|---|---|---|---|---|
| 2001 | 71 | 4 | 4 | 3 | 5 | 4 | 4 | 4 | 4 | 6 | 12 | 11 | 10 |
| 2002 | 46 | 5 | 6 | 5 | 5 | 4 | 2 | 2 | 2 | 3 | 3 | 4 | 5 |
| 2003 | 97 | 5 | 9 | 10 | 10 | 8 | 5 | 6 | 4 | 8 | 8 | 12 | 12 |
| 2004 | 105 | 10 | 9 | 13 | 10 | 9 | 5 | 4 | 5 | 8 | 11 | 8 | 13 |
| 2005 | 92 | 8 | 7 | 9 | 9 | 8 | 7 | 5 | 3 | 8 | 7 | 13 | 8 |
| 2006 | 101 | 11 | 9 | 10 | 12 | 8 | 5 | 5 | 4 | 7 | 10 | 8 | 12 |
| 2007 | 109 | 11 | 10 | 12 | 11 | 11 | 6 | 4 | 4 | 9 | 11 | 12 | 8 |
| 2008 | 486 | 5 | 3 | 3 | 5 | 16 | 28 | 43 | 30 | 45 | 85 | 86 | 137 |
| 2009 | 1,052 | 98 | 117 | 123 | 116 | 114 | 60 | 52 | 69 | 35 | 80 | 94 | 94 |
| 2010 | 1,087 | 114 | 61 | 86 | 136 | 89 | 57 | 59 | 65 | 90 | 94 | 128 | 108 |
| 2011 | 1,188 | 83 | 131 | 96 | 124 | 128 | 83 | 56 | 44 | 76 | 105 | 134 | 128 |
| 2012 | 1,556 | 194 | 122 | 173 | 144 | 133 | 117 | 66 | 76 | 104 | 152 | 138 | 137 |
| 2013 | 1,558 | 196 | 148 | 132 | 187 | 136 | 74 | 67 | 64 | 99 | 127 | 192 | 136 |
| 2014 | 1,619 | 213 | 161 | 164 | 182 | 119 | 101 | 90 | 55 | 91 | 151 | 171 | 121 |
| 2015 | 1,591 | 142 | 129 | 149 | 150 | 152 | 72 | 76 | 94 | 94 | 160 | 198 | 175 |
| 2016 | 1,515 | 143 | 159 | 127 | 151 | 123 | 92 | 83 | 57 | 111 | 122 | 147 | 200 |
| 2017 | 1,640 | 147 | 156 | 164 | 160 | 136 | 115 | 58 | 52 | 69 | 185 | 200 | 198 |
| 2018 | 1,638 | 218 | 162 | 183 | 145 | 123 | 94 | 76 | 79 | 93 | 159 | 148 | 158 |
| 2019 | 1,877 | 196 | 169 | 192 | 210 | 149 | 129 | 90 | 76 | 118 | 175 | 162 | 211 |
| 2020 | 1,764 | 155 | 182 | 173 | 159 | 149 | 110 | 74 | 78 | 142 | 169 | 215 | 158 |
| 2021 | 1,615 | 117 | 146 | 207 | 147 | 136 | 103 | 72 | 74 | 125 | 119 | 186 | 183 |

== Installations ==
| Site | County | Coordinates | Opened/operated | Size (MW) | Turbines: number, type, and model | Notes |
| Glenmore | Brown | 44.356944°N 87.9475°W | 1998-2012 | 1.2 | 1 Tacke 600e | test project |
| Lincoln Turbines | Kewaunee | | 1990-2018 | 9.2 | 14 Vestas V47 600 kW | |
| Rosiere Wind Farm | Kewaunee | | 1999-2018 | 11.2 | Vestas V47 600 kW | Madison Gas and Electric |
| Byron | Fond du Lac | | 1999-2019 | 1.3 | Vestas V47, 600 kW | |
| Montfort Wind Farm | Iowa | | 2001 | 30.0 | Enron (GE) 1.5 | We Energies |
| Cedar Ridge Wind Farm | Fond du Lac | | 2008 | 68.0 | Vestas V82, 1.65 | |
| Blue Sky Green Field | Fond du Lac | 43.912222°N 88.273611°W | 2008 | 145.2 | Vestas V82, 1.65 | We Energies |
| Butler Ridge | Dodge | | 2009 | 54.0 | 36 GE Wind Energy (GE) 1.5 XLE | NextEra Energy Resources |
| Forward Wind | Dodge & Fond du Lac | 43.616944°N 88.491111°W | 2008 | 129.0 | GE sle 1.5 | Invenergy |
| Shirley Wind | Brown | 44.356944°N 87.9475°W | 2011 | 20.0 | 8 Nordex 2.5 | Duke Energy declared a health hazard in 2014 |
| Glacier Hills Wind | Columbia | | 2011 | 162.0 | 90 Vestas V90, 1.8 | We Energies |
| Cashton Greens Wind | Monroe | | 2012 | 5.0 | 2 | Cashton community |
| Epic's Galactic Wind | Dane | | 2012 | 9.9 | Vestas V82 1.65 | |
| Quilt Block Wind | Lafayette | Darlington | 2017 | 98 | 49 Vestas 2.0 | Dairyland Power Cooperative |

== See also ==
- Solar power in Wisconsin
- Great Lakes offshore wind power
- Renewable energy in the United States
