= Calumet Light =

Lighthouse in Wisconsin, United States

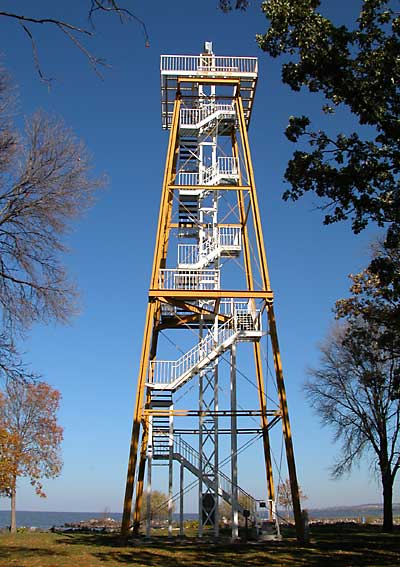
- Calumet Harbor Light
- Location: Calumet, Wisconsin
- Coordinates: 43°54′54″N 88°19′56.5″W

Tower
- Constructed: 1936
- Construction: Steel skeletal
- Height: 21 m (69 ft)

Light
- Focal height: 23 m (75 ft)
- Lens: Strobes
- Characteristic: 2 flashing white

The Calumet Harbor lighthouse is a three-story, open-air lighthouse and observation tower located in Calumet Harbor, in the town of Calumet, Wisconsin, approximately one mile west of Pipe, Wisconsin. It is located on the eastern shore of Lake Winnebago, inside the Columbia Park, a Fond du Lac County park. The structure is a steel skeletal tower with two flashing white strobe lights located on top.

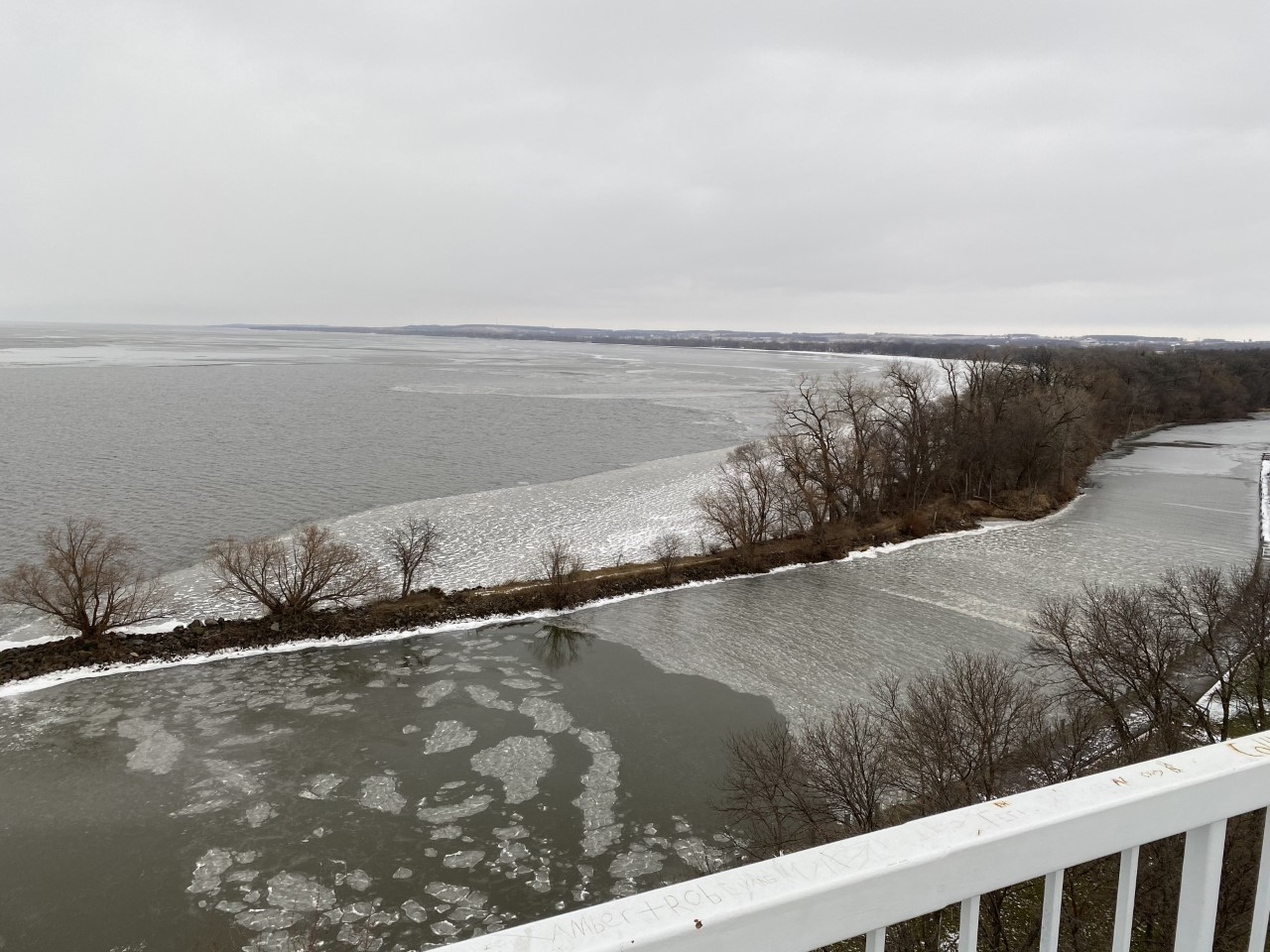
Calumet Harbor from the Calumet Light
