= Calumet Harbor, Wisconsin =

- Unincorporated community
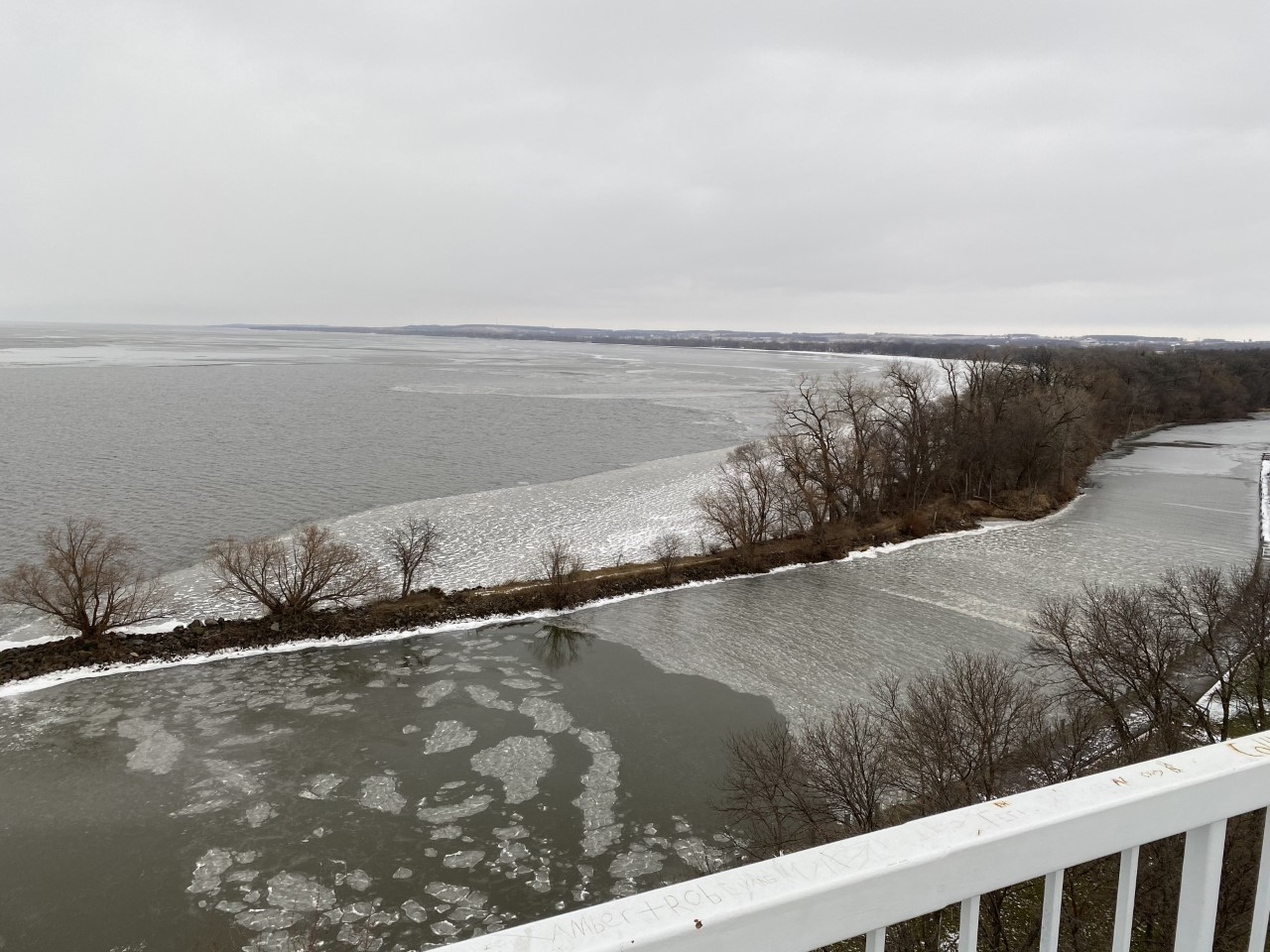
- Calumet Harbor from the Calumet Light.

- Location within Wisconsin Location within the United States
- Coordinates: 43°54′47″N 88°19′56″W
- Country: United States
- State: Wisconsin
- County: Fond du Lac
- Elevation: 748 ft (228 m)
- Time zone: UTC-6 (Central (CST))
  - Summer (DST): UTC-5 (CDT)
- Area code: 920
- GNIS feature ID: 1562522

Calumet Harbor is an unincorporated community in the town of Calumet, Fond du Lac County, Wisconsin, United States.

== Calumet Light ==
- Calumet Light, a lighthouse
