= Dale Michels =

American Businessman

- Born: Dale Robert Michels; August 4, 1932; Fond du Lac, Wisconsin, United States
- Died: April 8, 1998 (aged 65); Milwaukee, Wisconsin, U.S.
- Education: Lomira High School
- Occupation(s): Businessman, welder
- Known for: Founding and leading Michels Corporation
- Spouse: Ruth L. Koenigs (m. 1957)
- Children: 4, including Tim Michels

Dale Robert Michels (August 4, 1932 – April 8, 1998) was an American businessman who founded Michels Welding Company in 1959 which ultimately became Michels Corporation, one of the largest general contractors in North America. He was the father of Tim Michels. He is the namesake of SSM Health Dale Michels Heart & Vascular Care.

== Life ==
Michels was born August 4, 1932, in Fond du Lac, Wisconsin, the third of five children, to Oscar Joseph Michels, a worker of the Brownsville Canning Factory and later of Michels Pipeline, and Ruth C. Michels (née DeVoy).

== Personal life ==
In 1957, he married Ruth Lucile Koenigs, a daughter of Paul Koenigs and Sophie Koenigs (née Strobel), both of Campbellsport, Wisconsin. They had four sons, including businessman and politician Tim Michels.
