= Shirley Wind =

Wind farm in Wisconsin

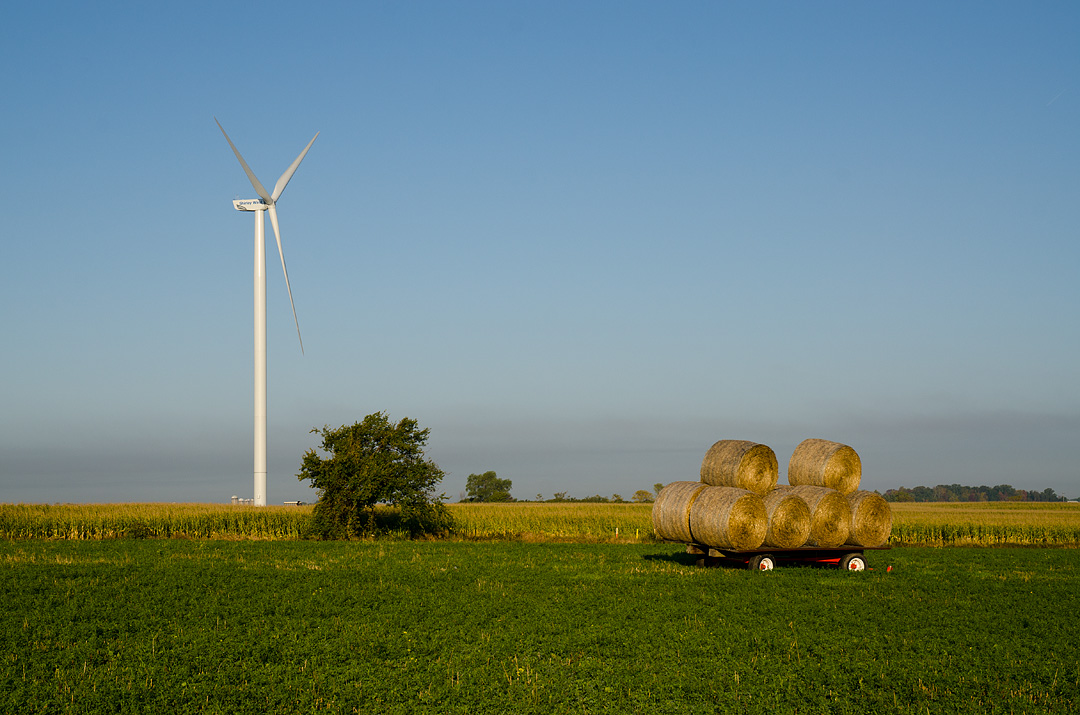
- Shirley Wind
- Country: United States
- Location: Shirley, Glenmore, Wisconsin
- Coordinates: 44°21′25″N 87°56′51″W
- Status: Operational
- Commission date: 2011
- Owner: Duke Energy

Wind farm
- Type: Onshore

Power generation
- Units operational: 8 Nordex 2.5 wind turbines
- Nameplate capacity: 20 MW

Shirley Wind is a wind farm in the Shirley section of Glenmore, Brown County, Wisconsin. The site, which opened in 2011, includes eight Nordex 2.5 (MW) wind turbines, each about 500 feet (150 m) tall. Originally developed by Emerging Energies LLC, it is owned by Duke Energy.

When the wind farm was built, the turbines were the tallest in the state of Wisconsin, and among the tallest in North America.

Following a study conducted in 2013, the Brown County Board of Health declared the Shirley Wind Farm a “human health hazard” in 2014. In 2015 the Brown County Health Director Chua Xiong said that there was insufficient scientific evidence to link wind turbines to illnesses experienced by residents.

== History ==
Shirley Wind was originally developed by Emerging Energies LLC, a Wisconsin wind energy company. Emerging Energies had been looking to construct a wind farm in northeast Wisconsin since 2004. The permits were secured from the town of Glenmore in 2007.

In 2009, Emerging Energies sold a 90 percent stake in the project to Central Hudson Energy Group.

Construction on the wind farm began in April 2009. The farm began commercial operation in December 2010, selling the power to Wisconsin Public Service Corporation.

In 2011, Duke Energy purchased Shirley Wind.

== Electricity Production ==
Generation Shirley Wind Power Plant (MW-h) and Capacity Factor
Year	Jan	Feb	Mar	Apr	May	Jun	Jul	Aug	Sep	Oct	Nov	Dec	Annual (Total)	Capacity Factor (%)
2010	-	-	-	-	-	-	-	-	-	-	1,583	1,337	2,920	10.0
2011	4,059	6,386	4,705	6,086	6,287	4,082	2,741	2,167	3,722	5,131	6,573	6,289	58,228	33.2
2012	7,956	4,996	7,113	5,913	5,448	4,766	2,710	3,130	4,257	6,210	5,628	5,602	63,729	36.4
2013	7,648	5,768	5,165	7,285	5,312	2,906	2,616	2,503	3,863	4,922	7,470	5,310	60,769	34.7
2014	8,538	6,449	6,588	7,281	4,768	4,071	3,633	2,223	3,655	6,082	6,870	4,859	65,018	37.1
2015	5,757	5,244	6,056	6,108	6,181	2,969	3,110	3,843	3,840	6,503	8,037	7,117	64,766	37.0
2016	5,688	6,335	5,045	5,991	4,910	3,668	3,307	2,297	4,421	4,875	5,849	7,966	60,350	34.4
2017	5,931	6,297	6,609	6,443	5,467	4,625	2,330	2,069	2,645	5,967	6,578	6,518	61,479	35.1
2018	7,247	5,268	5,940	4,741	4,032	2,783	2,328	2,516	2,827	5,102	4,852	5,319	52,955	30.2
2019	*													0.0
2020														0.0

* Data not available

== Health hazard ==
Soon after the wind farm went into operation, local residents began complaining of health problems they said were caused by low frequency noise stemming from the wind turbines. Ultimately, over 75 local residents filed complaints with the Brown County Board of Health.

In January 2012, the Brown County Board of Health requested emergency aid from the state to assist families suffering from the effects of the wind farm.

In January 2013, a study of the low frequency noise was completed, which showed that three of the houses studied had evidence of low frequency noise, but in only one house was that noise coming from the outside. However, the study could not conclude that the health effects experienced by local residents were caused by the wind farm.

In October 2014, the Brown County Board of Health declared the Shirley Wind farm a "human health hazard", based on the complaints of local residents, becoming the first board of health in the country to make such a declaration.

In December 2015, after reviewing studies and evidence, Brown County Health Director Chua Xiong declared that there was insufficient evidence linking the wind turbines to the illnesses suffered by local residents.

This decision was called into question after an Open Records request revealed that Xiong experienced migraines when near the wind turbines. She said: "The times I have been out there by the Wind Turbines, l get such migraine headaches, I think I should take some preventative Tylenol before I head out there."

Migraines are a frequently observed symptom reported to the Brown County Health Department by people living near Shirley Wind's turbines when they are operating.

Xiong resigned her position the day before the emails were revealed to a local citizen's group through an Open Records request.

== See also ==
- Wind power in Wisconsin
- Solar power in Wisconsin
- Wind power in the United States
- List of wind farms
