= Garnet, Wisconsin =

- Unincorporated community
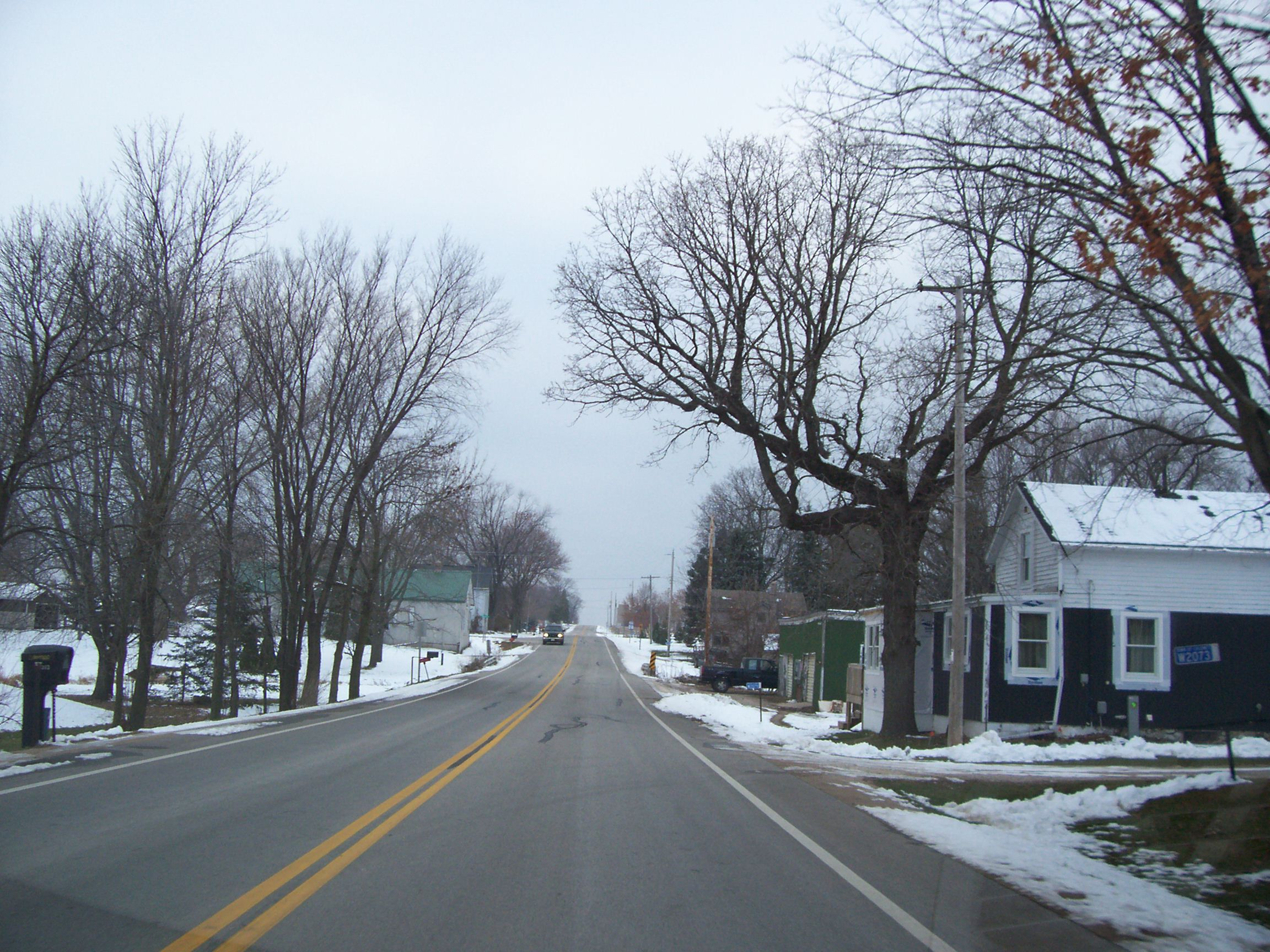
- Garnet, Wisconsin
- Nickname: Cream City
- Location within Wisconsin Location within the United States
- Coordinates: 43°56′08″N 88°15′46″W
- Country: United States
- State: Wisconsin
- County: Fond du Lac
- Established: circa 1880
- Elevation: 942 ft (287 m)
- Time zone: UTC-6 (Central (CST))
  - Summer (DST): UTC-5 (CDT)
- Zip codes: 53049
- Area code: 920
- GNIS feature ID: 1565424

Garnet is an unincorporated community in Fond du Lac County, in the U.S. state of Wisconsin. The community is on the northern boundary of the county, just south of Calumet County. It is located at the intersection of County Highway HHH and Town Hall Road just east of Calumet County C, in the town of Calumet. Garnet is located 1.95 miles (3.14 km) east of Calumetville.

== History ==
The community was settled in around 1880. It is nicknamed "Cream City."

== Images ==
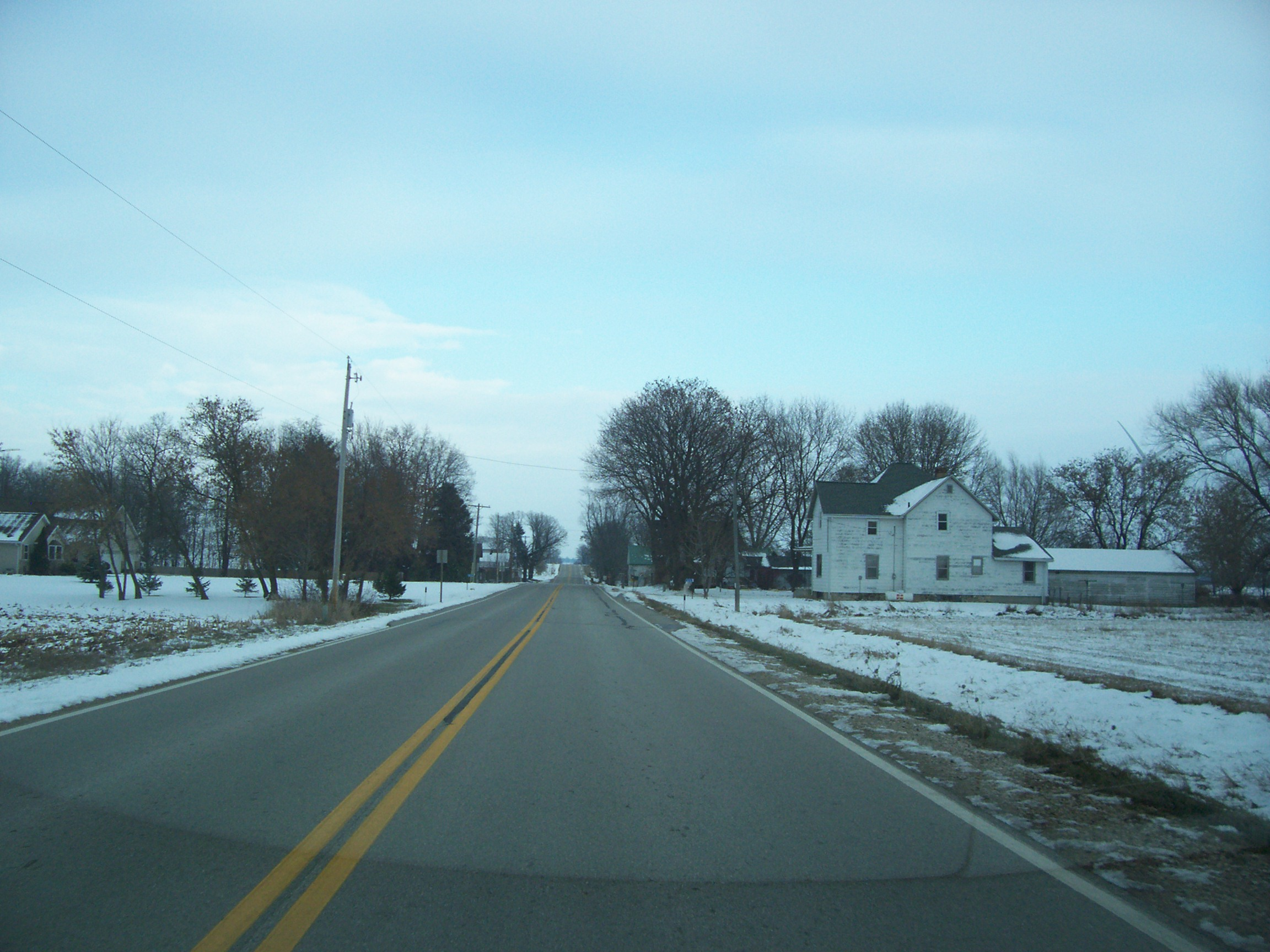
Looking east at Garnet

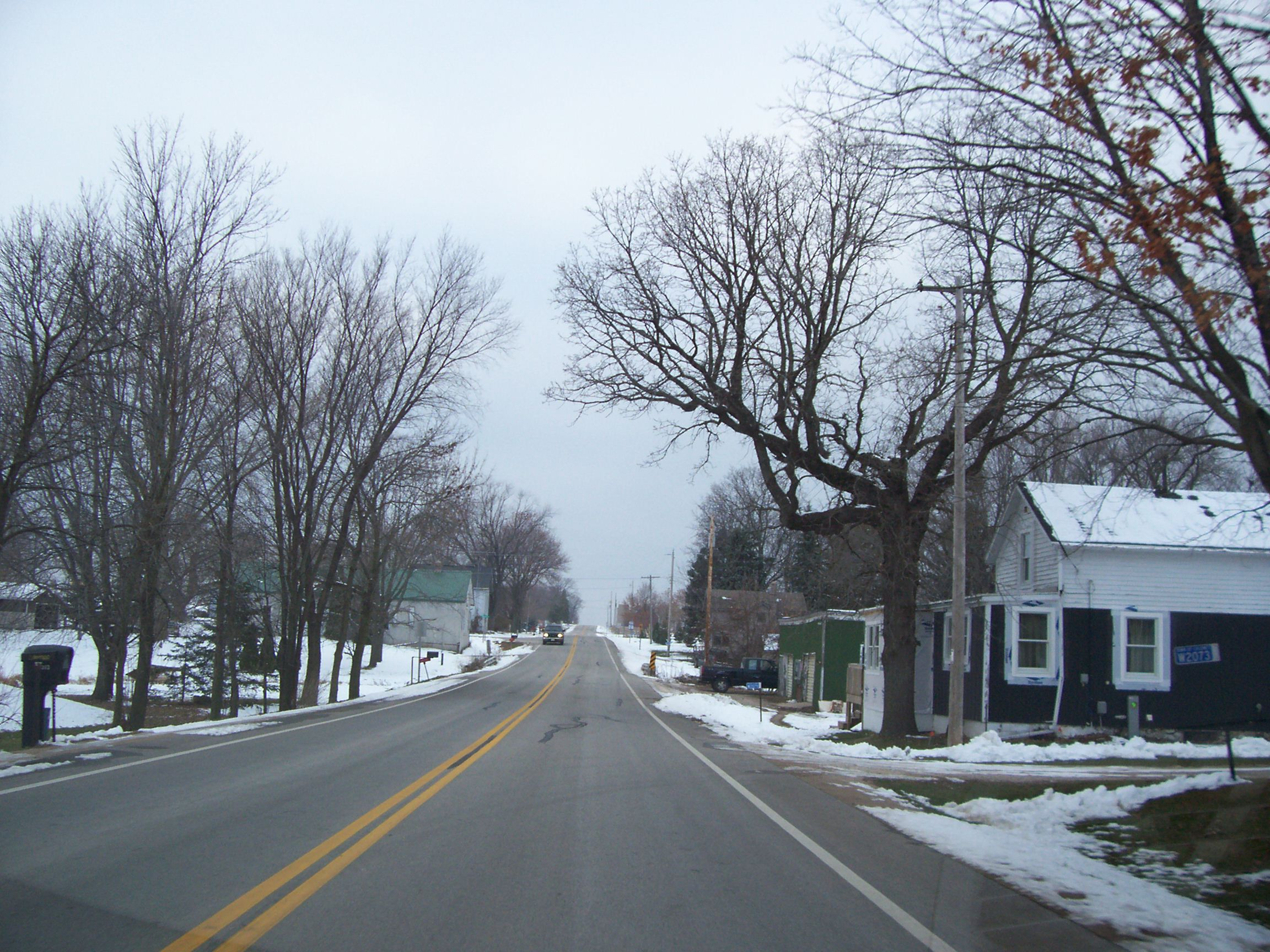
Looking west at Garnet on HHH
