= Artesia Beach, Wisconsin =

- Unincorporated community
- Location within Wisconsin Location within the United States
- Coordinates: 43°56′05″N 88°18′54″W
- Country: United States
- State: Wisconsin
- County: Fond du Lac
- Elevation: 751 ft (229 m)
- Time zone: UTC-6 (Central (CST))
  - Summer (DST): UTC-5 (CDT)
- Area code: 920
- GNIS feature ID: 1560963

Artesia Beach is an unincorporated community in the town of Calumet, Fond du Lac County, Wisconsin, United States.
