= Shirley, Wisconsin =

- Unincorporated community
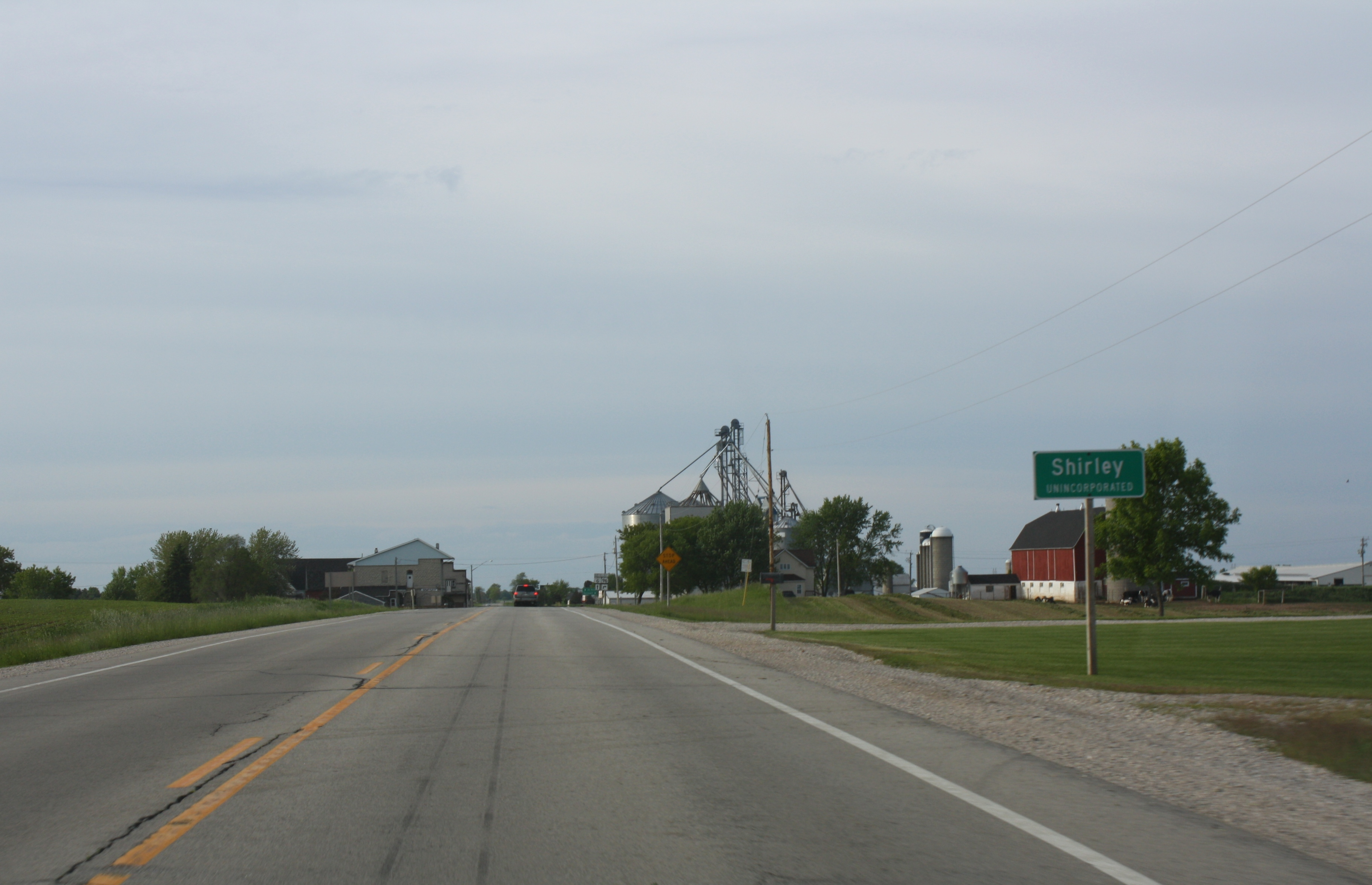
- Looking north at Shirley

- Location within Wisconsin Location within the United States
- Coordinates: 44°21′25″N 87°56′51″W
- Country: United States
- State: Wisconsin
- County: Brown
- Town: Glenmore
- Elevation: 942 ft (287 m)
- Time zone: UTC-6 (Central (CST))
  - Summer (DST): UTC-5 (CDT)
- Area code: 920
- GNIS feature ID: 1574057

Shirley is an unincorporated community in the town of Glenmore, Brown County, Wisconsin, United States. It is located on Wisconsin Highway 96.

== History ==
The community was supposedly named after a paint brand sold at Zellner's General Store in Shirley.

== Economy ==
Shirley Wind, a wind farm, is located in the community.
