= Upper Shirley =

Upper Shirley may refer to:

In England

- Upper Shirley, Croydon, London
- Upper Shirley, Southampton, Hampshire

In the United States

- Upper Shirley, Virginia in Charles City County
