= Glenmore, Wisconsin =

- Town
- Location in Brown County and the state of Wisconsin.
- Coordinates: 44°22′23″N 87°56′42″W
- Country: United States
- State: Wisconsin
- County: Brown

Area
  - Total: 32.9 sq mi (85.1 km^{2})
  - Land: 32.8 sq mi (85.0 km^{2})
  - Water: 0.039 sq mi (0.1 km^{2})
- Elevation: 912 ft (278 m)

Population (2020)
  - Total: 1,045
  - Density: 32/sq mi (12.3/km^{2})
- Time zone: UTC-6 (Central (CST))
  - Summer (DST): UTC-5 (CDT)
- Area code: 920
- FIPS code: 55-29550
- GNIS feature ID: 1583285
- Website: www.glenmorewisconsin.gov

Glenmore is a town in Brown County in the U.S. state of Wisconsin. The population was 1,045 at the 2020 census.

== Communities ==
- Glenmore is an unincorporated community located at the intersection of Glenmore Road and Langes Corner Road.
- Shirley is an unincorporated community located at the intersection of WIS 96/Shirley Road and Dickinson Road.

== Geography ==
The Town of Glenmore, in Brown County, is located in Northeastern Wisconsin, approximately 10 miles southeast of Green Bay. Glenmore is primarily an agricultural community. According to the United States Census Bureau, the town has a total area of 32.8 square miles (85.0 km^{2}), of which 0.023 square miles (0.06 km^{2}), or 0.07%, is water.

== Demographics ==
As of the census of 2000, there were 1,187 people, 375 households, and 322 families residing in the town. The population density was 36.3 people per square mile (14.0/km^{2}). There were 382 housing units at an average density of 11.7 per square mile (4.5/km^{2}). The racial makeup of the town was 99.33% White, 0.34% Asian, 0.08% Pacific Islander, and 0.25% from two or more races. Hispanic or Latino of any race were 0.51% of the population.

There were 375 households, out of which 45.6% had children under the age of 18 living with them, 76.8% were married couples living together, 4.5% had a female householder with no husband present, and 14.1% were non-families. 10.7% of all households were made up of individuals, and 4.0% had someone living alone who was 65 years of age or older. The average household size was 3.17 and the average family size was 3.41.

In the town, the population was spread out, with 31.8% under the age of 18, 8.4% from 18 to 24, 30.7% from 25 to 44, 20.8% from 45 to 64, and 8.3% who were 65 years of age or older. The median age was 33 years. For every 100 females, there were 105.4 males. For every 100 females age 18 and over, there were 103.5 males.

The median income for a household in the town was $51,466, and the median income for a family was $52,200. Males had a median income of $33,333 versus $22,262 for females. The per capita income for the town was $19,487. About 2.9% of families and 2.7% of the population were below the poverty line, including 4.7% of those under age 18 and none of those age 65 or over.

== Economy ==
The wind farm Shirley Wind is located in the town, in the community of Shirley.
