= Brownsville, Wisconsin =

- Village
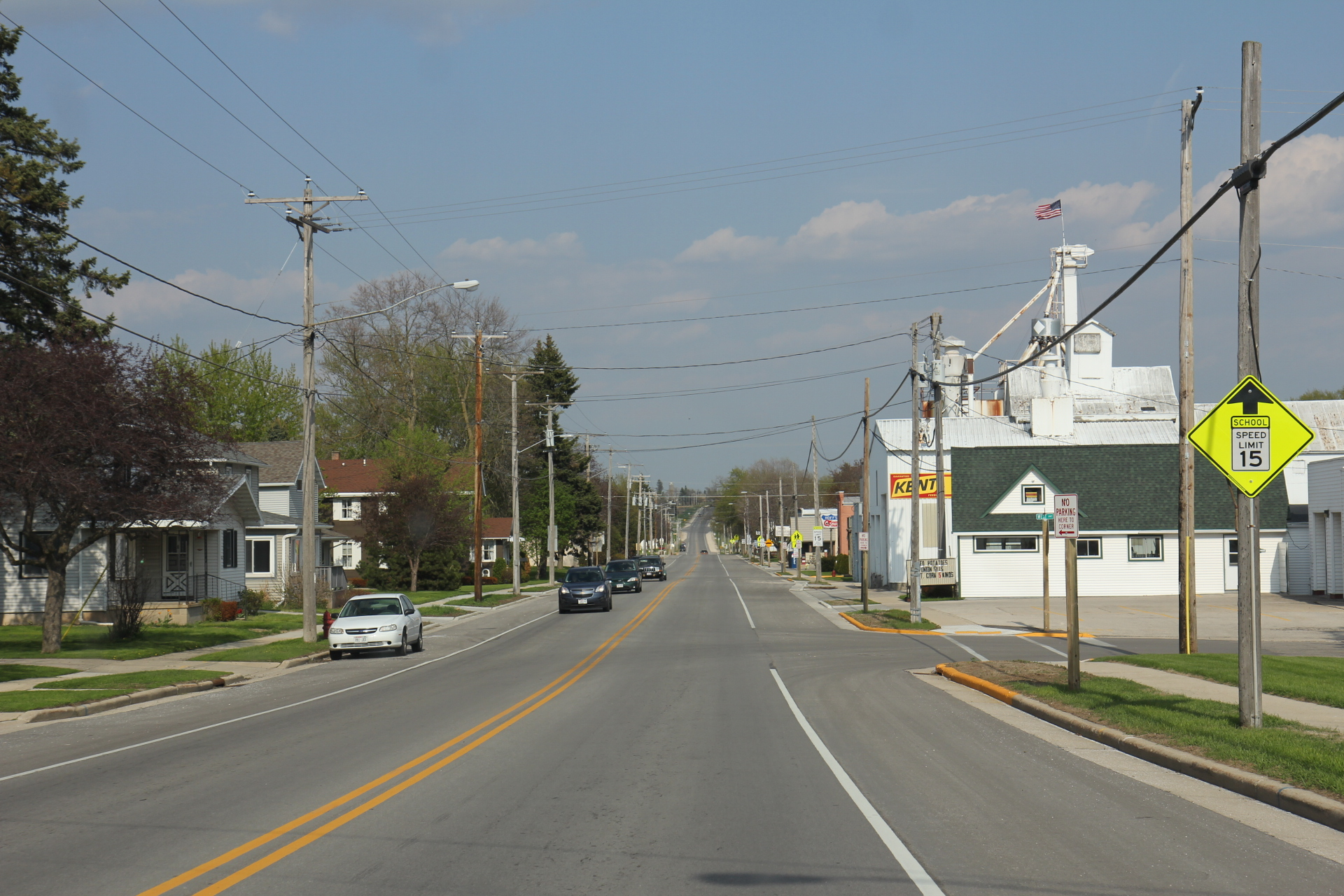
- Looking east in Brownsville on Wisconsin Highway 49

- Location of Brownsville in Dodge County, Wisconsin.
- Coordinates: 43°36′59″N 88°29′26″W
- Country: United States
- State: Wisconsin
- County: Dodge

Area
  - Total: 0.61 sq mi (1.59 km^{2})
  - Land: 0.61 sq mi (1.59 km^{2})
  - Water: 0 sq mi (0.00 km^{2})
- Elevation: 997 ft (304 m)

Population (2020)
  - Total: 598
  - Density: 976/sq mi (376.7/km^{2})
- Time zone: UTC-6 (Central (CST))
  - Summer (DST): UTC-5 (CDT)
- Postal code: 53006
- Area code: 920
- FIPS code: 55-10450
- GNIS feature ID: 1562277
- Website: www.villageofbrownsvilletoday.com

Brownsville is a village in Dodge County, Wisconsin, United States. The population was 598 at the 2020 census.

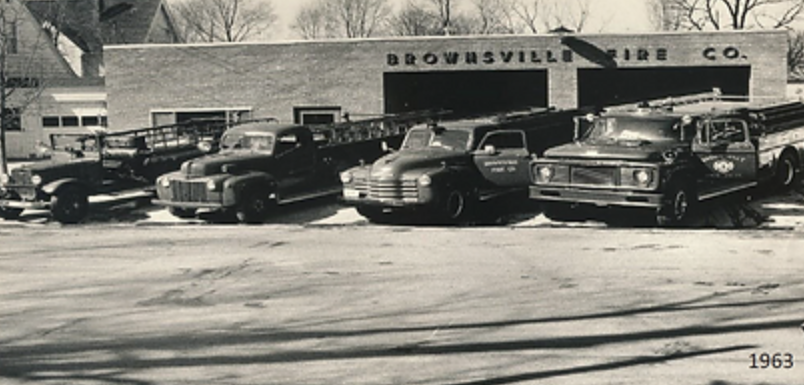
Brownsville Fire Company station and equipment, c. 1963

== History ==
The Village of Brownsville was first known as Thetis Station and had a narrow gauge railroad connection to Fond du Lac and Iron Ridge. In April 1878 the village was officially renamed to its current name, which was taken in honor of Alfred D. Brown, an English immigrant and pioneer farmer who in 1850 had settled an 80-acre farm on the edge of the village and became one of the first merchants there as well. The village remained unincorporated until it gained official status as an incorpated village on December 23, 1952. 1878 can therefore be regarded as the village's founding, with 1952 being its start as a proper municipality. As the town became more established towards the turn of the 20th Century, additional businesses and agricultural infrastructure were built, including crop storage bins and a grain elevator. In 1902 a small factory was built in town where it was used in local cheese production by various owners until the building was purchased by Michels Corporation in 1965, and demolished in 1973.

The Brownsville Fire Company, the local fire department, was organized in 1891 and originally consisted of 13 members and hook-and-ladder wagon with a hand-operated water pump. It was reorganized in October 1912. The first mechanical fire truck was purchased in 1931, a Studebaker pump truck which remains preserved today in local private ownership. The fire department today operates modern equipment, and responds to local and surrounding emergencies in collaboration with the emergency services of other towns in Dodge and Fond du Lac counties.

The local Lutheran church, Saint Paul's Lutheran Church, began in 1885 when 15 local families from the congregation in Lomira (bearing the same name) were released to begin meeting as their own congregation. They built their first church building in 1887, which was located on Main Street next to the current cemetery until it was destroyed by a fire on September 6, 1909. The same year as the construction of the first church, the congregation elected a local Mr. Gottmanshausen as its first pastor, who accepted the call of the community. Reverend Gottmanshausen was installed on June 25, 1887. The current church, located a block away from the cemetery, was constructed in June 1915. It was completed in November later that year, and still stands in use today.

On August 28, 2018, an EF1 tornado caused major damage in the village. The tornado uprooted trees, tore siding off from buildings, damaged roofs, and downed power lines, among other destruction. The village was put under a state of emergency, with residents only being allowed in days after the tornado.

== Geography ==
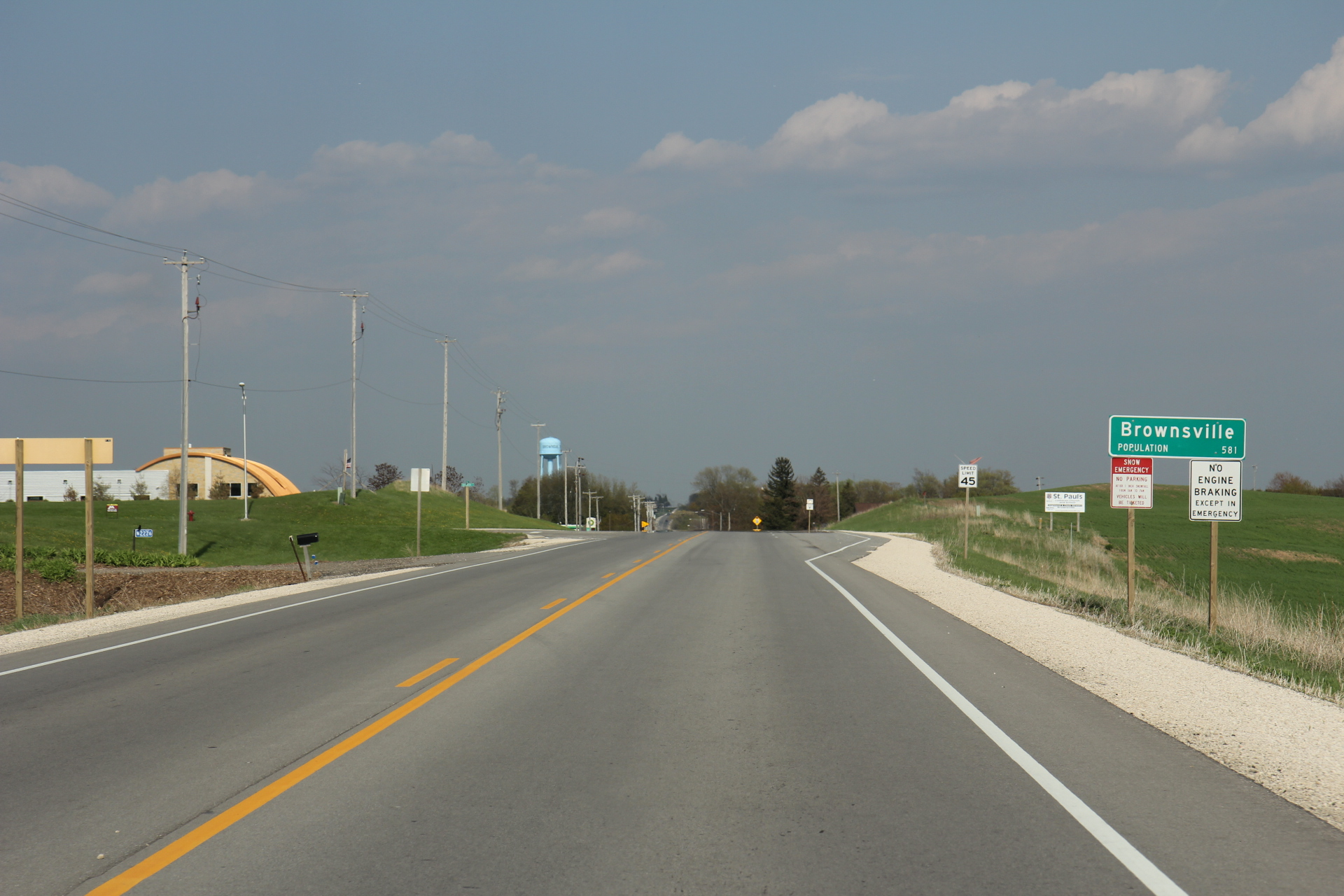
Sign for Brownsville

Brownsville is located two miles from US Hwy 41 and Wisconsin Highway 175. Wisconsin Highway 49 runs through the village.

Kummel Creek, a tributary of the Rock River, begins just north of the village, through which it flows, and the Horicon Marsh sits approximately five miles west of the town.

According to the United States Census Bureau, the village has a total area of 0.52 square miles (1.35 km^{2}), all land.

== Demographics ==
Historical population
Census	Pop.	Note	%±
1960	276		—
1970	374		35.5%
1980	433		15.8%
1990	415		−4.2%
2000	570		37.3%
2010	581		1.9%
2020	598		2.9%
U.S. Decennial Census

=== Racial and ethnic composition ===
Brownsville village, Wisconsin – Racial and ethnic composition Note: the US Census treats Hispanic/Latino as an ethnic category. This table excludes Latinos from the racial categories and assigns them to a separate category. Hispanics/Latinos may be of any race.
Race / Ethnicity (NH = Non-Hispanic)	Pop 2000	Pop 2010	Pop 2020	% 2000	% 2010	% 2020
White alone (NH)	565	570	556	99.12%	98.11%	92.98%
Black or African American alone (NH)	0	2	3	0.00%	0.34%	0.50%
Native American or Alaska Native alone (NH)	0	2	0	0.00%	0.34%	0.00%
Asian alone (NH)	0	2	0	0.00%	0.34%	0.00%
Native Hawaiian or Pacific Islander alone (NH)	0	2	0	0.00%	0.34%	0.00%
Other race alone (NH)	0	0	0	0.00%	0.00%	0.00%
Mixed race or Multiracial (NH)	3	0	12	0.53%	0.00%	2.01%
Hispanic or Latino (any race)	2	3	27	0.35%	0.52%	4.52%
Total	570	581	598	100.00%	100.00%	100.00%

=== 2010 census ===
As of the census of 2010, there were 581 people, 221 households, and 175 families living in the village. The population density was 1,117.3 inhabitants per square mile (431.4/km^{2}). There were 233 housing units at an average density of 448.1 per square mile (173.0/km^{2}). The racial makeup of the village was 98.6% White, 0.3% African American, 0.3% Native American, 0.3% Asian, and 0.3% Pacific Islander. Hispanic or Latino of any race were 0.5% of the population.

There were 221 households, of which 37.6% had children under the age of 18 living with them, 70.1% were married couples living together, 7.2% had a female householder with no husband present, 1.8% had a male householder with no wife present, and 20.8% were non-families. 18.6% of all households were made up of individuals, and 5.9% had someone living alone who was 65 years of age or older. The average household size was 2.63 and the average family size was 2.99.

The median age in the village was 40.1 years. 25% of residents were under the age of 18; 7.9% were between the ages of 18 and 24; 25.4% were from 25 to 44; 30.6% were from 45 to 64; and 11% were 65 years of age or older. The gender makeup of the village was 50.6% male and 49.4% female.

=== 2000 census ===
As of the census of 2000, there were 570 people, 209 households, and 166 families living in the village. The population density was 1,467.3 people per square mile (564.3/km^{2}). There were 213 housing units at an average density of 548.3 per square mile (210.9/km^{2}). The racial makeup of the village was 99.30% White, 0.18% from other races, and 0.53% from two or more races. Hispanic or Latino of any race were 0.35% of the population.

There were 209 households, out of which 37.8% had children under the age of 18 living with them, 73.2% were married couples living together, 4.3% had a female householder with no husband present, and 20.1% were non-families. 17.7% of all households were made up of individuals, and 7.2% had someone living alone who was 65 years of age or older. The average household size was 2.73 and the average family size was 3.11.

In the village, the population was spread out, with 26.7% under the age of 18, 7.5% from 18 to 24, 33.7% from 25 to 44, 20.9% from 45 to 64, and 11.2% who were 65 years of age or older. The median age was 36 years. For every 100 females, there were 104.3 males. For every 100 females age 18 and over, there were 100.0 males.

The median income for a household in the village was $62,679, and the median income for a family was $65,441. Males had a median income of $40,625 versus $26,071 for females. The per capita income for the village was $22,452. None of the population or families were below the poverty line.

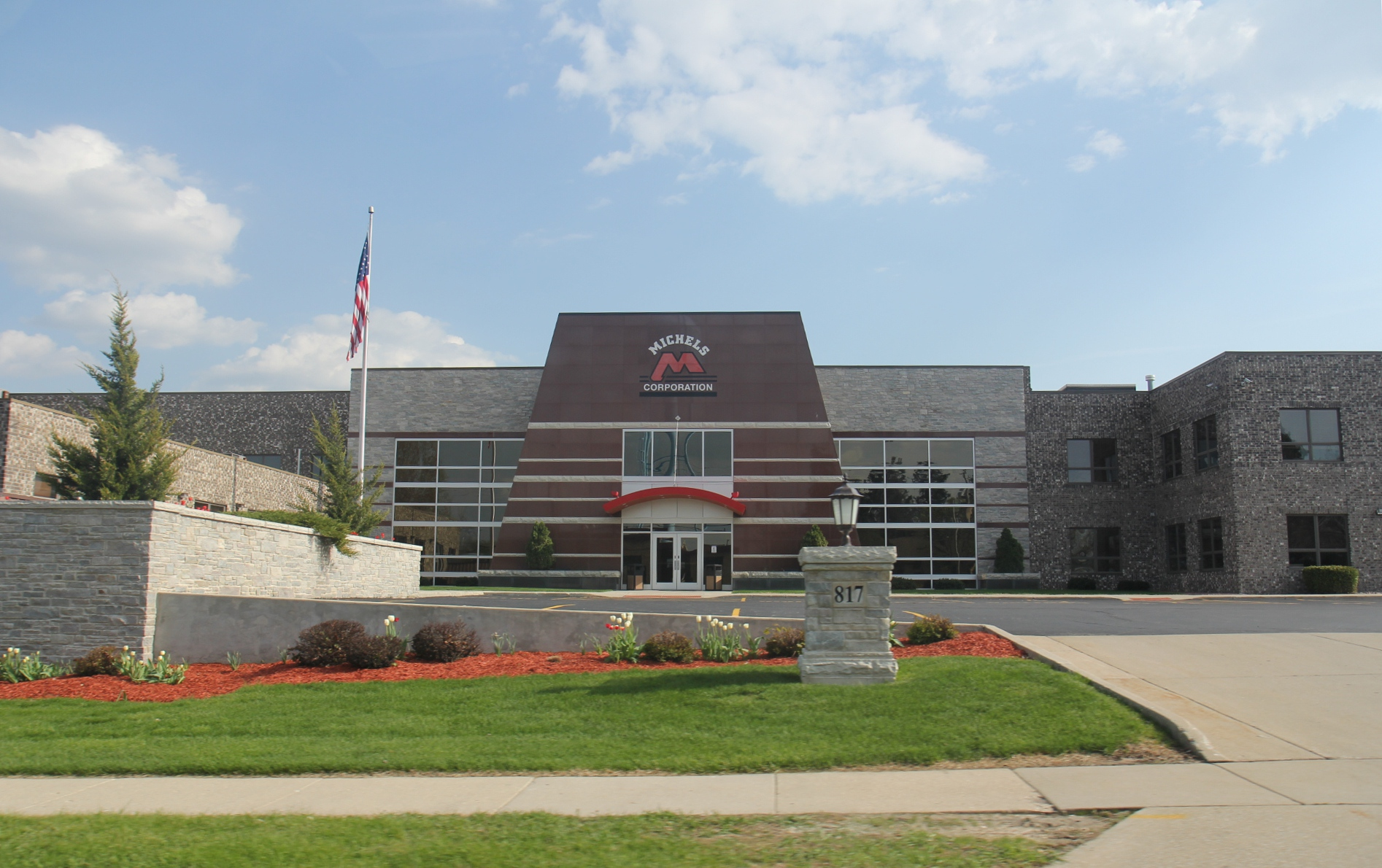
Michels Corporation

== Amenities ==
Brownsville contains a variety of businesses, including a bowling alley, a bar and grill, an apple orchard, a bank, a gas station, a dentist, and a medical clinic affiliated with SSM Health and Saint Agnes Hospital in Fond du Lac. The corporate headquarters of Michels Corporation is located in Brownsville. Public amenities include the local public library, two parks, baseball/softball diamonds and soccer fields, and a community center that functions both as a hub for community events as well as a rentable space for private events.

Civil service in the village includes the local fire department, a public works department, a police department consisting of one officer, and a post office. The interior of the local post office notably features photos of local residents who currently serve, or have previously served, in the United States Armed Forces. The village manages a water tower and a sewage disposal facility.
