= Michels Corporation =

American construction company

- Type: Family owned and operated
- Industry: Energy, infrastructure, engineering, design and construction contractor
- Founded: 1959, Brownsville, Wisconsin (as Michels Pipeline Construction)
- Founder: Dale Michels
- Headquarters: Brownsville, Wisconsin; United States
- Key people: Pat Michels, President; Tim Michels, Vice-President; Kevin Michels, Vice President
- Number of employees: 8,000
- Website: www.michels.us

Michels Corporation is an American construction company headquartered in Brownsville, Wisconsin. It was founded in 1959. It operates in multiple countries.

== History ==
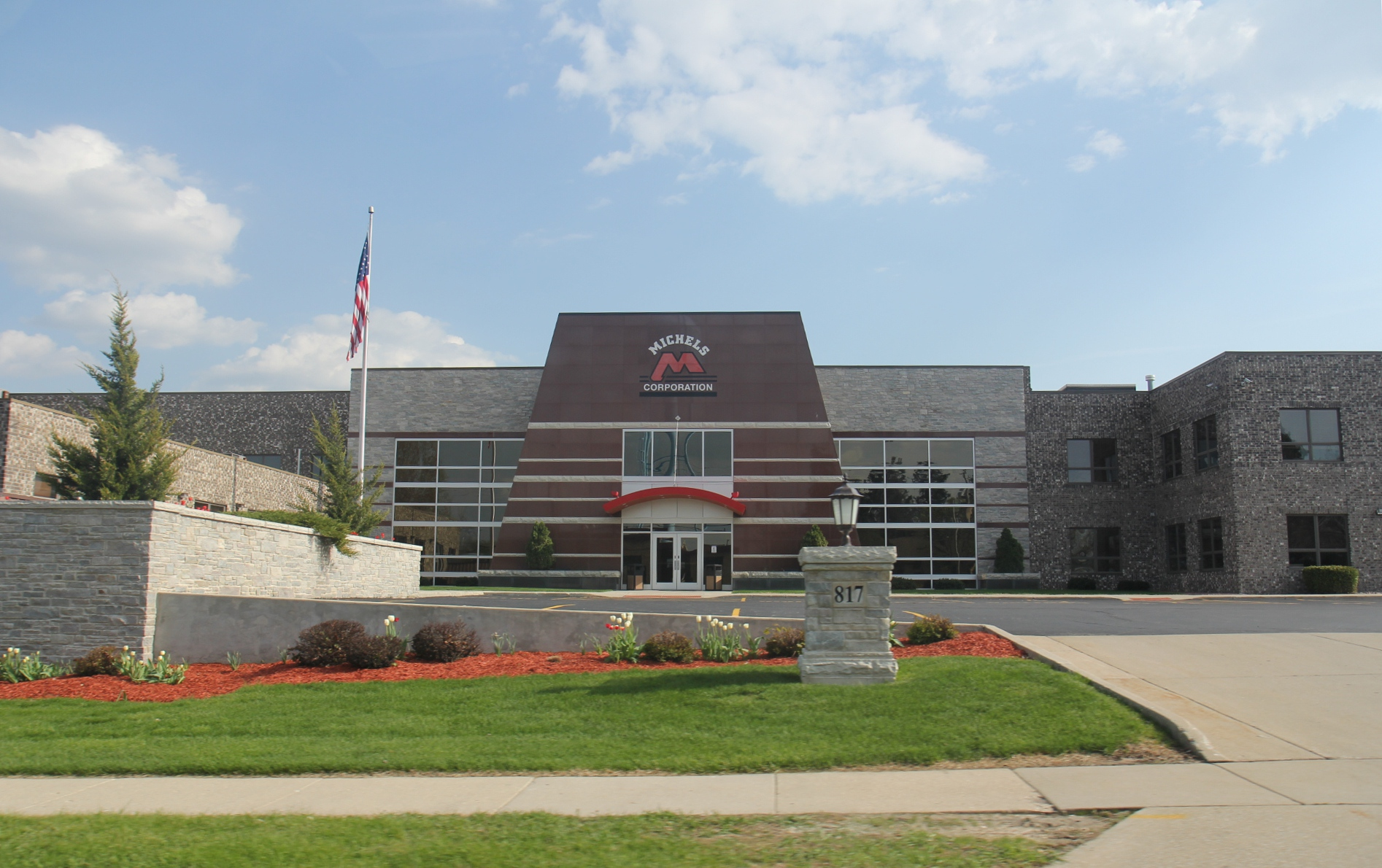
Corporate headquarters in Brownsville, Wisconsin, 2014

Michels was founded in 1959 by Dale Michels as Michels Pipeline Construction Inc., a regional gas pipeline construction company. The services provided by the company expanded rapidly in the first year of its development. One of the company's first projects was outside of plant construction and involved installation of buried cables for a regional telephone company in Wisconsin. The next decades brought expansions of infrastructure-related services, including sewer, water, tunneling and fiber-optic communication networks.

In 1988, Michels became a pioneer in trenchless construction by mastering the new technology of horizontal directional drilling. To this day, Michels is an award-winner and record-holder in many techniques used for the trenchless installation and rehabilitation of utility lines.

Dale Michels was joined in business by his wife, Ruth Michels, and his sons, Pat Michels, Tim Michels and Kevin Michels. When Dale Michels died in 1998, Ruth Michels became CEO and eventually chairwoman of the board until her death in 2020. Presently, Dale and Ruth Michels’ sons continue to lead the company; Pat Michels is president and CEO, and Tim Michels and Kevin Michels are vice presidents. Several members of the third generation of the Michels family also have active roles in business operations.

In 2001, the company's name was changed from Michels Pipeline Construction to Michels Corporation to better reflect its spectrum of energy and infrastructure services. In subsequent years, Michels has expanded operations throughout North America. In addition to performing work as Michels Corporation, several wholly owned companies provide targeted services as part of the Michels family of companies.

== Controversy ==
As a nationally leading petroleum contractor, building large oil and gas pipeline projects, Michels Corporation was a subcontractor of TC Energy, the Calgary-based company building the Keystone XL pipeline. The controversial project, representative of many similar oil and gas pipeline projects Michels Corporation completes, has been applauded for job creation, but has also been called "dangerous" for local communities and a major contributor to climate change by creating substantial greenhouse gas and carbon emissions through the burning of fossil fuels. After former U.S. President Donald Trump approved a permit for the Keystone Pipeline in 2017, the project was halted by the United States federal government under Joe Biden's White House administration on June 9, 2021. "Opponents of the line fought its construction for years, saying it was unnecessary and would hamper the U.S. transition to cleaner fuels."

== Accolades ==
28th – ENR Top 400 Contractors (2021)

5th – ENR Top Petroleum Contractors (2021)

20th – ENR Top 50 Contractors Working Abroad (2021)

25th – ENR Top 100 Contractors by New Contracts (2021)

== Affiliates and operating groups ==
In addition to performing work as Michels Corporation, several wholly owned companies provide specific services as part of the Michels family of companies. All companies share the same operating principles and core values.

=== Michels Canada ===
Established in 1996, Michels Canada constructs energy and infrastructure projects throughout Canada. The company serves the energy, electrical power, water and wastewater, and transportation industries. Michels Canada has completed many high-profile, award-winning projects individually and as part of joint ventures.

=== Michels Pacific Energy, Inc. ===
Michels Pacific Energy, Inc. builds, maintains and updates power and energy infrastructure in California and parts of the West Coast. Michels Pacific Energy works with engineering partners on Engineering-Procurement-Construction and Design-Build delivery method contracts.

=== Michels Pipeline, Inc. ===
Michels Pipeline, Inc. is a full-service mainline pipeline, facilities, and maintenance and repair contractor. Services include pipe fabrication; oil, gas, and water pipeline installation; compressor and pumping station construction; and integrity, maintenance, and emergency repairs. Michels Pipeline has completed some of the most significant pipeline projects in recent history. Michels Pipeline is known for its industry-leading safety culture.

=== Michels Power, Inc. ===
Michels Power, Inc. is one of the largest private power utility electrical contractors in the United States. The company provides overhead power line and underground utility transmission and distribution, substation, communication and storm restoration services from coast to coast. Michels Power also supports renewable energy, including battery energy storage, solar and wind power.

=== Michels Utility Services, Inc. ===
Michels Utility Services, Inc. is a leading contractor constructing and maintaining natural gas distribution systems and other utilities throughout the United States. Michels Utility Services works in urban and rural areas to build, improve and upgrade gas utility services and to complete joint trench installations.

=== Construction materials ===
Michels owns and operates approximately 100 pits and quarries in Wisconsin to mine and produce aggregates, U.S. Army Corps of Engineers-approved armor stone and granite. The company owns one of the largest fleets of completely mobile crushing spreads, wash plants and power screen plants in the United States.

=== Foundations ===
Michels foundation capabilities are focused on the deep foundation, ground improvement, earth retention and marine disciplines. In-house design-build capabilities result in cost-effective, engineered solutions for a wide variety of projects. Michels has performed work to support energy, transportation and building trade project.

=== Transportation ===
In the transportation industry, Michels construction services span the United States, from New York to Seattle, including road building, tunneling, railways, bridges and aviation. Michels has been honored for improving safety and quality of transportation on interstate highways and at airports. Specialized equipment includes concrete paving machines, batch plants and mobile recycle crushing spreads.

=== Trenchless ===
Michels uses a variety of techniques to install and rehabilitate utility lines with minimal surface disturbances. Over several decades, Michels has won awards and set records for its work throughout North America. New installation techniques include: Direct Pipe, horizontal directional drilling, microtunneling, pipe assistance and auger boring. Rehabilitation techniques include cured-in-place pipe (CIPP), spray-in-place pipe (SIPP), sliplining, pipe bursting and chemical grouting.

== Project examples ==
Bakken Missouri River Crossing

Michels completed a 2.5-mile Horizontal Directional Drill in the Bakken region of North Dakota. The directional drill project beneath the Missouri River and the Lake Sakakawea Reservoir was part of 10 miles of 20-inch diameter pipeline construction.

Nexus Pipeline

Michels built 177 miles of 36-inch natural gas transmission pipeline, three meter and two compressor stations, both with 29,700 HP single turbine engines. The project included 224 road bores, 88 crews and 12 Horizontal Directional Drills.

Mill Basin Bridge

The Mill Basin Bridge in Brooklyn was part of the $700 million Belt Parkway reconstruction project connecting highways in Brooklyn and Queens. The Belt Parkway reconstruction project received the 2018-2019 Construction Achievement Project of the Year Award from the American Society of Civil Engineers (ASCE) Metropolitan Section and the 2019 Project of the Year Award from the New York State Society of Professional Engineers (NYSSPE).
