= Calumet, Wisconsin =

- Town
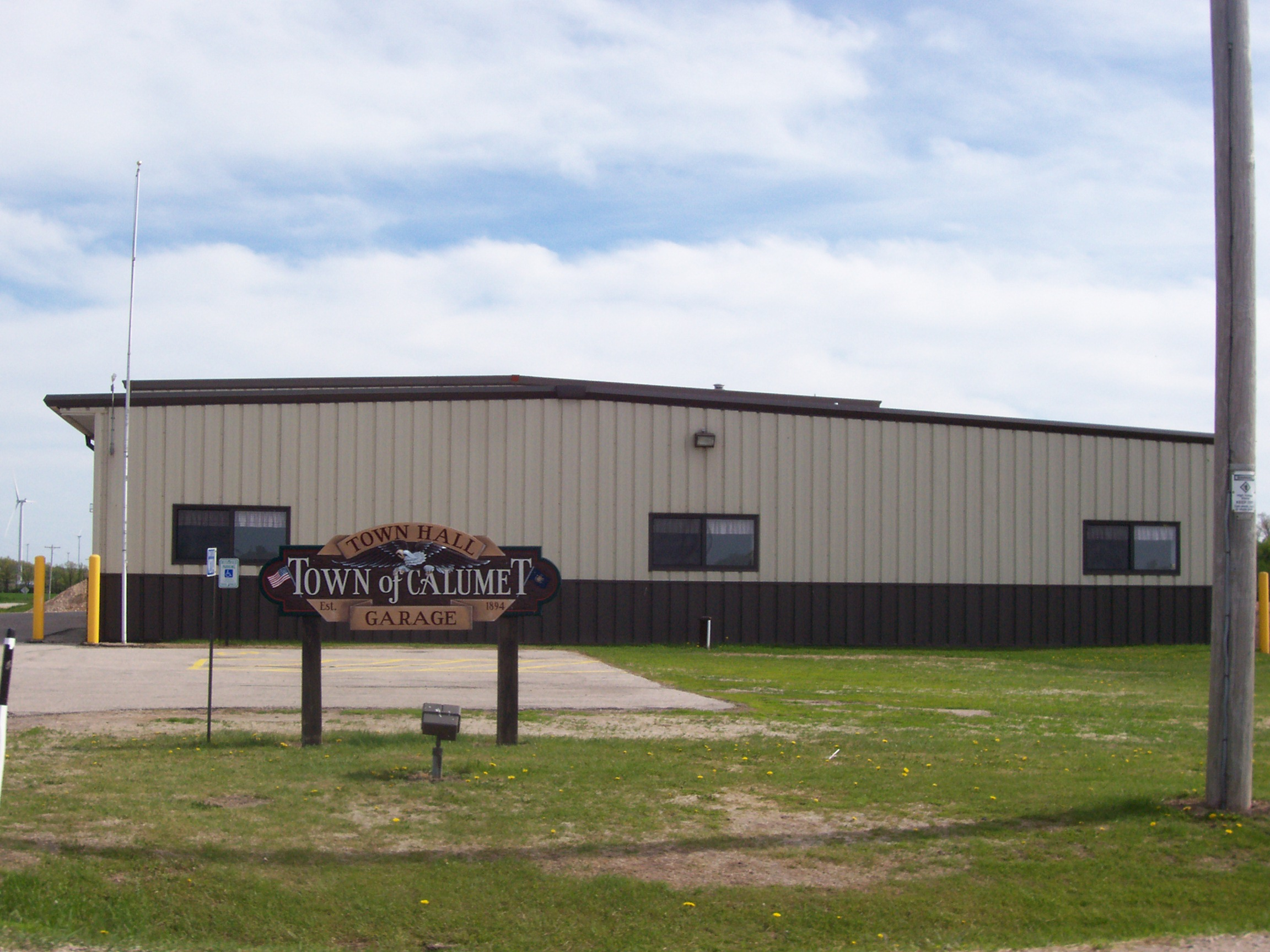
- Town hall

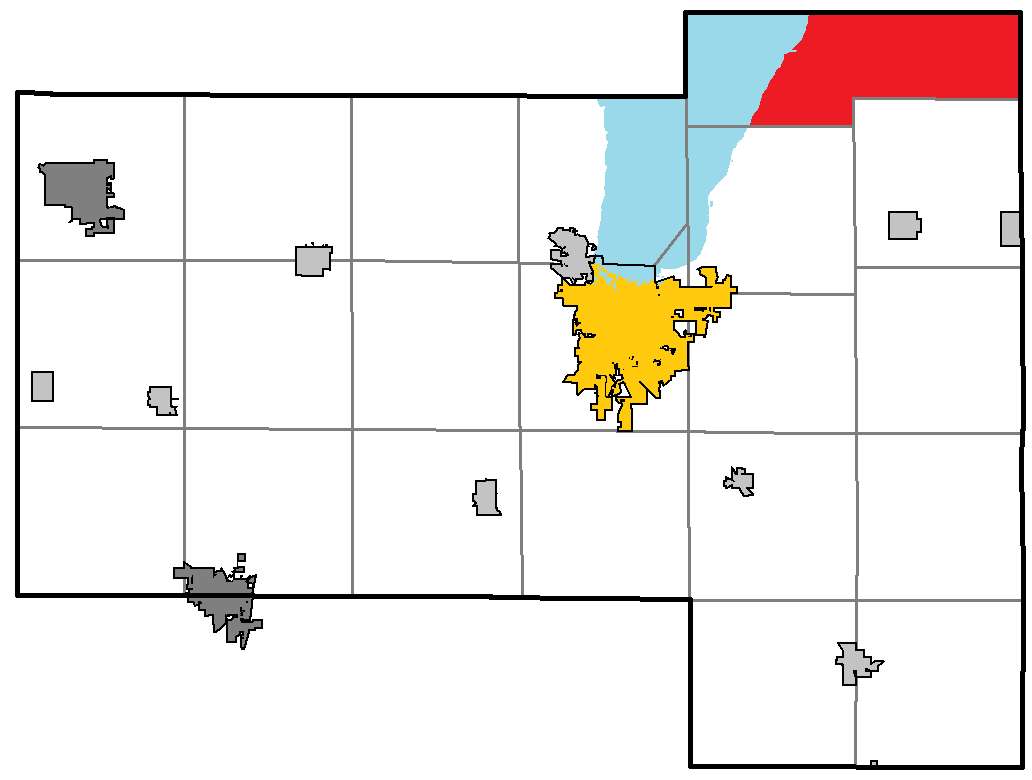
- Location of Calumet, within Fond du Lac County
- Coordinates: 43°54′44″N 88°16′25″W
- Country: United States
- State: Wisconsin
- County: Fond du Lac

Area
  - Total: 44.1 sq mi (114.2 km^{2})
  - Land: 30.2 sq mi (78.2 km^{2})
  - Water: 13.9 sq mi (36.0 km^{2})
- Elevation: 846 ft (258 m)

Population (2020)
  - Total: 1,412
  - Density: 46.8/sq mi (18.1/km^{2})
- Time zone: UTC-6 (Central (CST))
  - Summer (DST): UTC-5 (CDT)
- Area code: 920
- FIPS code: 55-12075
- GNIS feature ID: 1582907

There is also a county in Wisconsin called Calumet County, Wisconsin which is adjacent to the town.

Calumet is a town in Fond du Lac County, Wisconsin, United States. The population was 1,412 at the 2020 census. The unincorporated communities of Artesia Beach, Calumet Harbor, Garnet, Highland Park, Johnsburg, Laudolff Beach, Marytown, Pipe, Pukwana Beach, Winnebago Heights, and Winnebago Park are located within the town. The unincorporated community of Calumetville is located partially in the town.

== History ==
The town was first surveyed in 1834 and 1835. The first settlement was near Pipe in 1837. The town was organized March 8, 1839, then reorganized in 1842. A flour mill was constructed near Pipe in 1854.

== Geography ==
According to the United States Census Bureau, the town has a total area of 44.1 square miles (114.2 km^{2}), of which 30.2 square miles (78.2 km^{2}) is land and 13.9 square miles (36.0 km^{2}) (31.55%) is water.

== Demographics ==
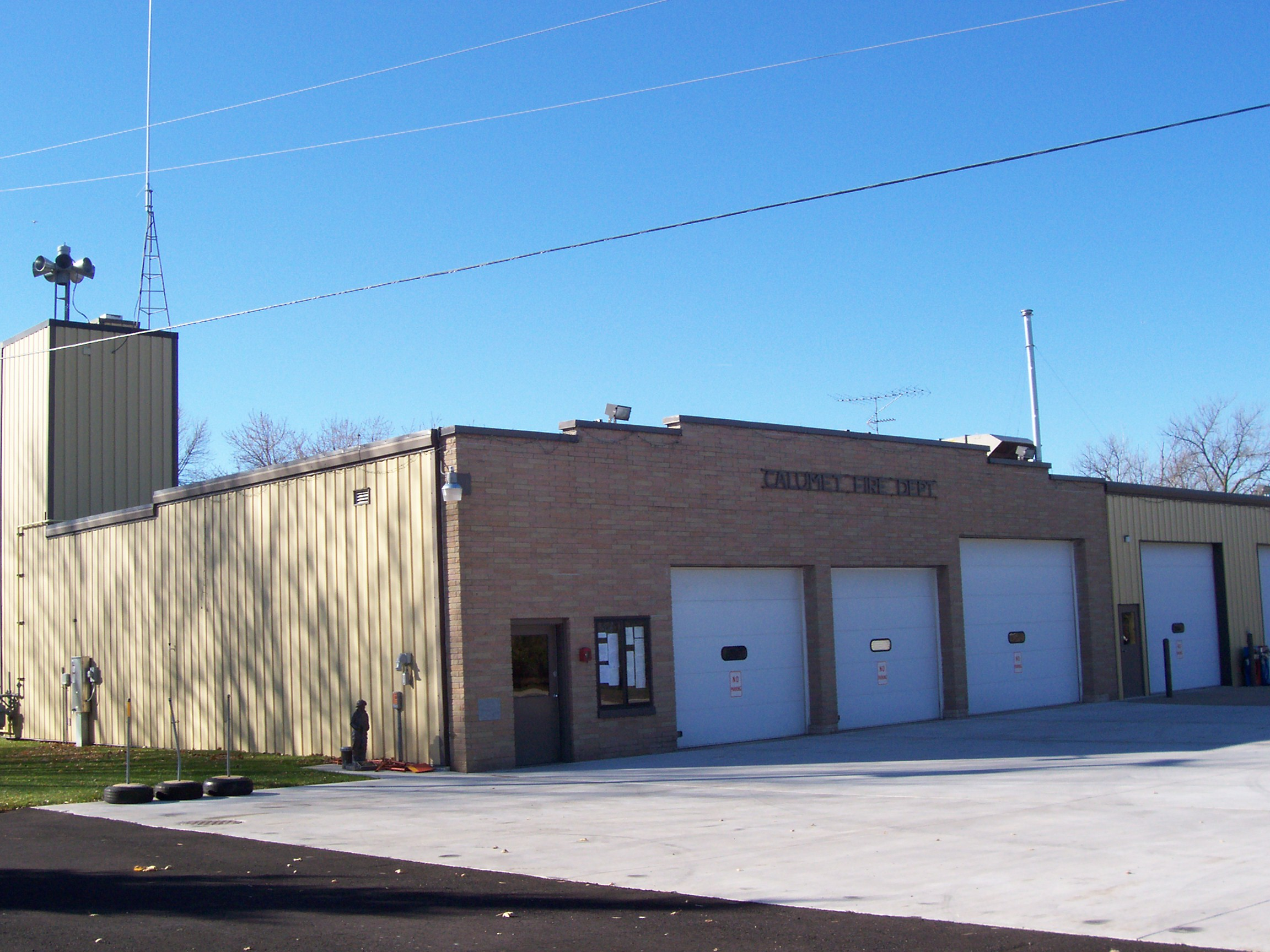
Fire station for the town's volunteer fire department

As of the census of 2000, there were 1,514 people, 562 households, and 423 families residing in the town. The population density was 50.2 people per square mile (19.4/km^{2}). There were 774 housing units at an average density of 25.6 per square mile (9.9/km^{2}). The racial makeup of the town was 98.35% White, 0.13% African American, 0.73% Native American, 0.20% Asian, 0.07% from other races, and 0.53% from two or more races. Hispanic or Latino of any race were 0.99% of the population.

There were 562 households, out of which 29.9% had children under the age of 18 living with them, 67.3% were married couples living together, 4.1% had a female householder with no husband present, and 24.6% were non-families. 20.6% of all households were made up of individuals, and 8.0% had someone living alone who was 65 years of age or older. The average household size was 2.61 and the average family size was 3.03.

In the town, the population was spread out, with 22.9% under the age of 18, 9.4% from 18 to 24, 24.8% from 25 to 44, 27.2% from 45 to 64, and 15.8% who were 65 years of age or older. The median age was 41 years. For every 100 females, there were 109.7 males. For every 100 females age 18 and over, there were 114.3 males.

The median income for a household in the town was $45,789, and the median income for a family was $51,823. Males had a median income of $34,712 versus $22,400 for females. The per capita income for the town was $19,707. About 1.4% of families and 5.4% of the population were below the poverty line, including 3.8% of those under age 18 and 4.0% of those age 65 or over.

== Economy ==
The Blue Sky Green Field Wind Farm was constructed throughout the town in 2007 and opened in May 2008.
