= Blue Sky Green Field Wind Energy Center =

Wind farm in Wisconsin, US

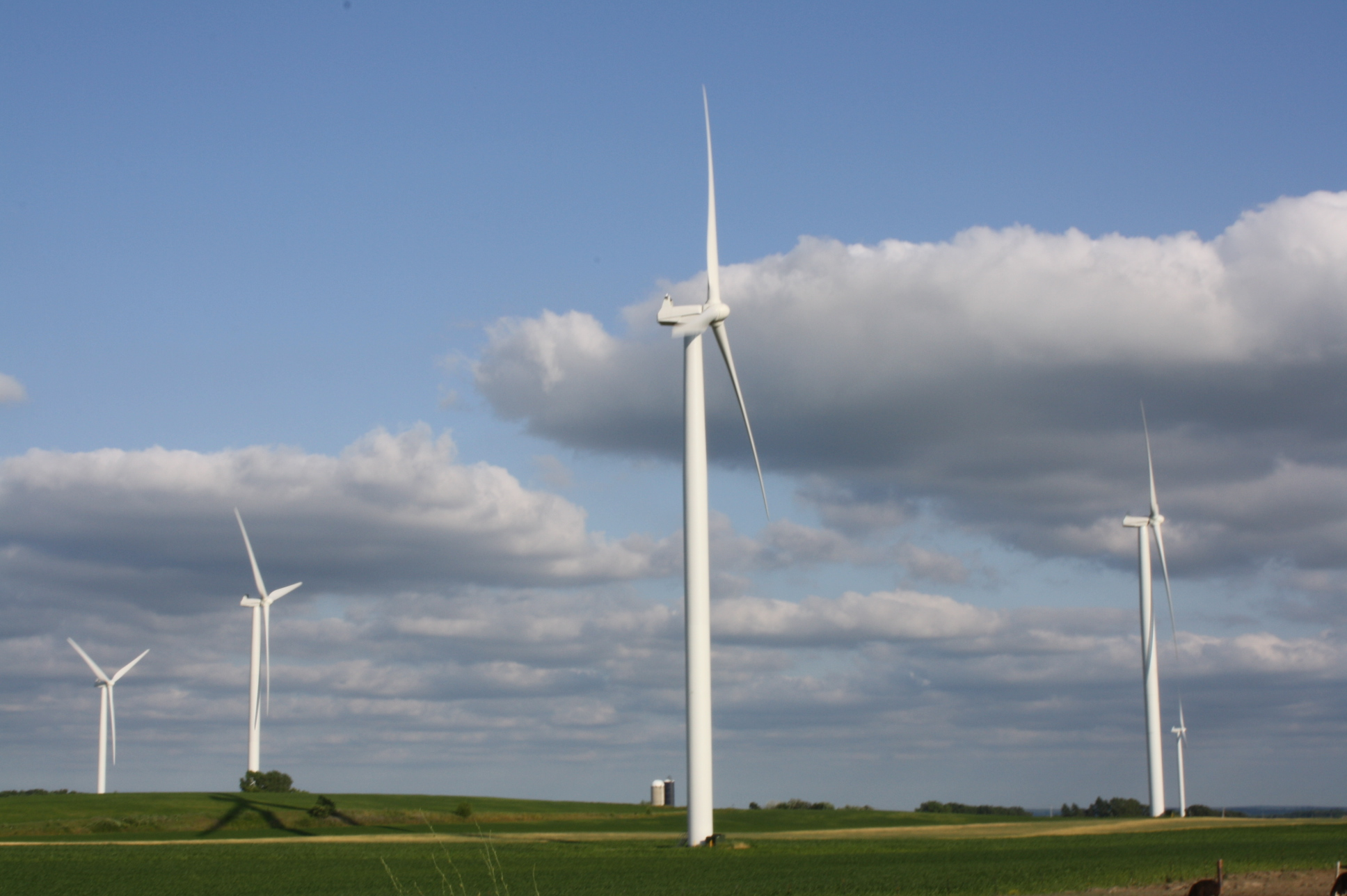
- Turbines east of Johnsburg
- Country: United States
- Location: Fond du Lac County, Wisconsin
- Coordinates: 43°52′46″N 88°16′15″W
- Status: Operational
- Construction began: June 2007
- Commission date: May 2008
- Construction cost: $300 million
- Owner: We Energies

Wind farm
- Type: Onshore

Power generation
- Units operational: 88 turbines
- Make and model: Vestas V82-1.65 MW
- Nameplate capacity: 145.2 MW
- Capacity factor: 26.8% (average 2009-2017)
- Annual net output: 341 GW·h

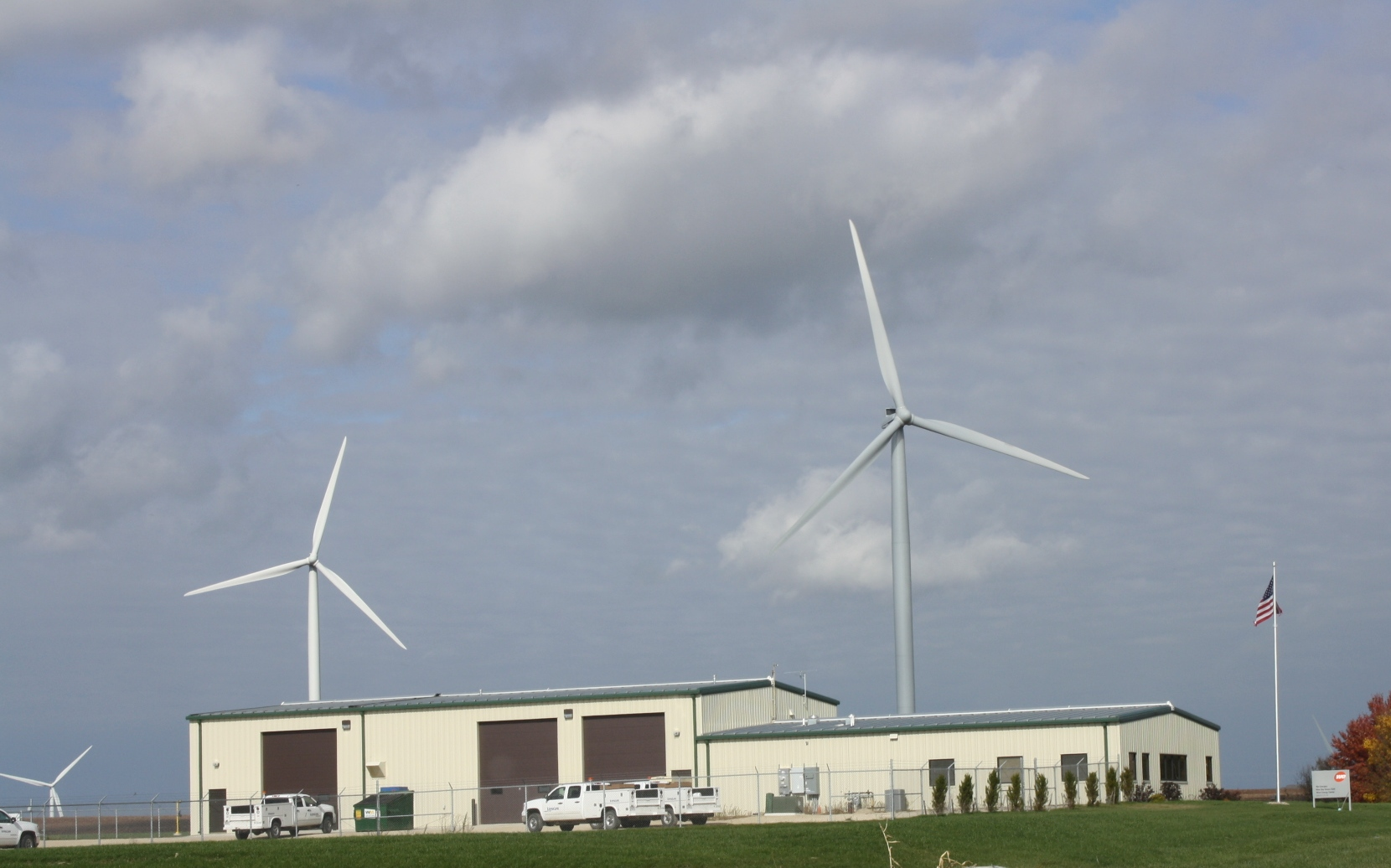
Wind Farm Headquarters

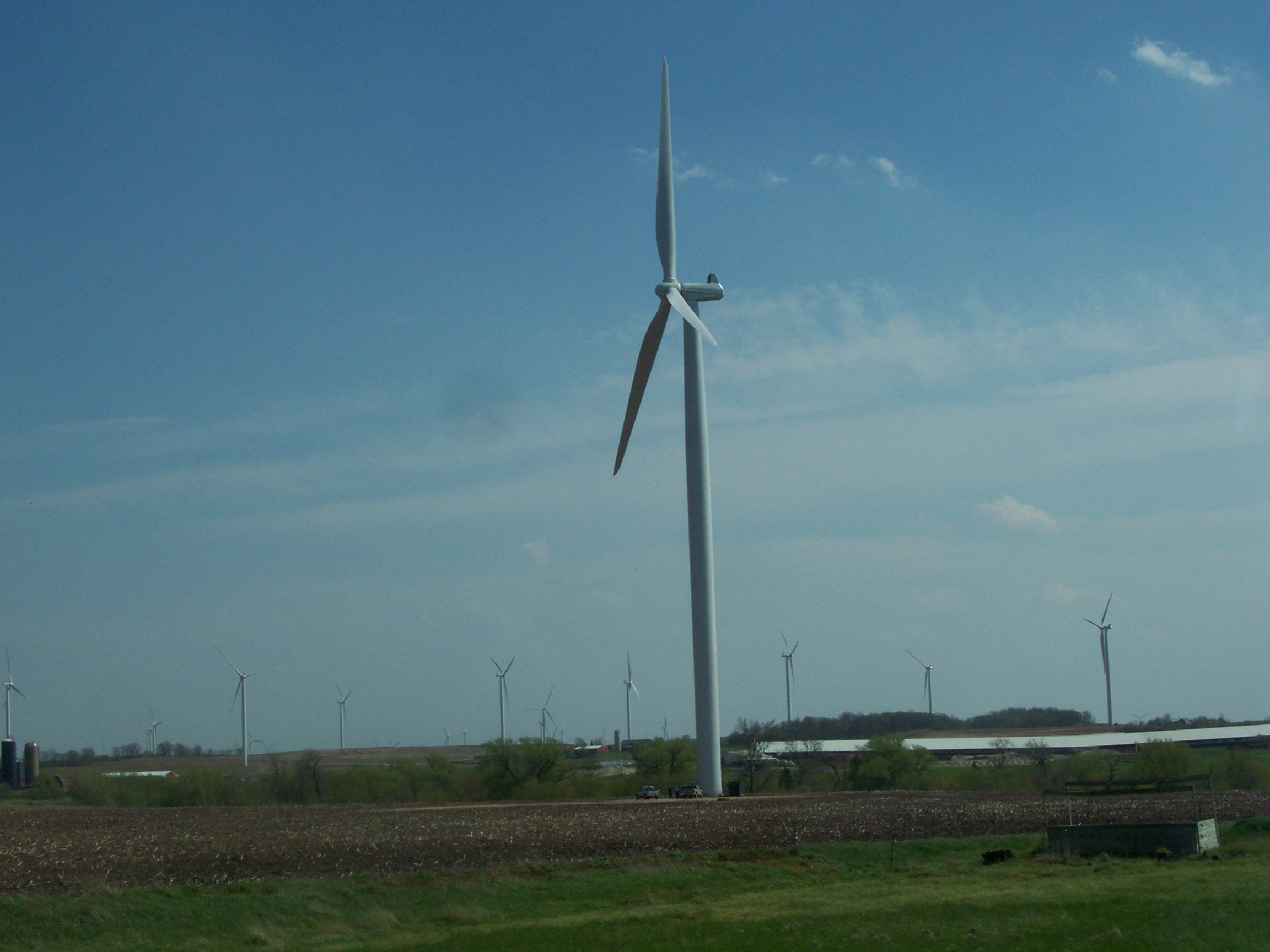
Looking south at the Blue Sky Green Field Wind Farm

Blue Sky Green Field Wind Energy Center is a wind farm in northeast Fond du Lac County, Wisconsin. The 10,600-acre (4,300 ha) facility is located in the towns of Calumet and Marshfield. Owned by We Energies, it became the largest operating installation using wind power in Wisconsin when it came online in 2008.

== History ==
An application for authorization to construct the Blue Sky Green Field Wind Farm was filed with the Public Service Commission of Wisconsin (PSCW) on March 17, 2006. On February 1, 2007, the PSCW issued the certificate of public convenience and necessity authorizing the project.

Construction on the farm began in June 2007 by Alliant Wind Connect at a cost of $300 million. Testing began in 2008, and the farm was placed in service on May 19, 2008.

== Capacity ==
The wind farm consists of 88 Vestas Wind Systems V82 turbines, which have a capacity to produce 145 megawatts of power. They are expected to generate 328 million kilowatt hours annually, which is enough to power 36,000 homes. Each turbine is capable of production 1.65 megawatts of electricity. The turbines are approximately 262 feet (80 m) tall, and reach 397 feet (121 m) tall when the 134-foot (41 m) blade is faced upwards.

== Electricity production ==
Generation (MW-h) and Capacity Factor of Blue Sky Green Field Wind Power Plant
Year	Jan	Feb	Mar	Apr	May	Jun	Jul	Aug	Sep	Oct	Nov	Dec	Annual (Total)	Capacity Factor (%)
2008					10,935	22,359	17,141	11,761	18,874	36,395	37,939	49,403	204,807	24.1
2009	34,387	37,553	37,958	34,667	35,225	18,776	15,705	20,249	10,784	28,808	28,101	34,007	336,220	26.4
2010	35,701	16,398	20,538	42,946	27,707	17,372	17,132	20,030	29,306	28,282	39,369	32,099	326,880	25.7
2011	22,687	38,156	29,611	35,870	36,401	24,716	14,984	11,899	22,338	31,541	37,917	31,406	337,526	26.5
2012	42,962	31,342	39,692	27,517	27,248	20,617	13,388	15,485	21,969	35,923	30,814	29,258	336,215	26.4
2013	45,786	32,111	29,735	41,994	28,185	14,936	8,987	12,774	19,463	28,270	44,133	32,356	338,730	26.6
2014	48,829	37,230	34,245	38,544	24,996	21,458	19,023	9,830	19,468	33,584	37,186	26,551	350,944	27.6
2015	36,089	31,125	36,200	36,885	32,583	15,262	15,783	21,307	18,669	38,716	43,168	39,029	364,816	28.7
2016	33,058	35,105	26,157	30,833	26,495	20,595	17,568	11,880	23,564	26,254	31,819	50,141	333,469	26.2
2017	33,035	35,075	36,815	35,889	30,451	25,764	12,980	11,522	14,733	33,237	36,643	36,308	342,453	26.9
2018	41,293	30,018	33,846	27,015	22,977	15,855	13,264	14,339	16,110	29,070	27,645	30,307	301,738	23.7
2019	34,235	29,738	33,300	36,102	25,423	22,517	14,479	12,577	18,973	29,288	27,988	36,996	321,616	25.3
2020	31,794	35,220	33,320	30,604	26,553	19,508	12,262	11,487	25,786	33,576	44,581	31,930	336,621	26.5
2021	21,276	27,874	41,318	24,986	23,731	18,610	10,895	11,180	21,773	19,886	39,710	38,392	299,631	23.5
2022	34,854	37,287	38,060	43,002	24,514	20,718	13,391	8,977	12,834	19,570	33,558	32,392	319,157	
2023	21,727	40,792	31,397	39,932	21,464	11,537	3,869	14,407	16,899					

== See also ==
- Wind power in Wisconsin
- List of wind farms in the United States
