= Solar power in Wisconsin =

Overview of solar power in the U.S. state of Wisconsin

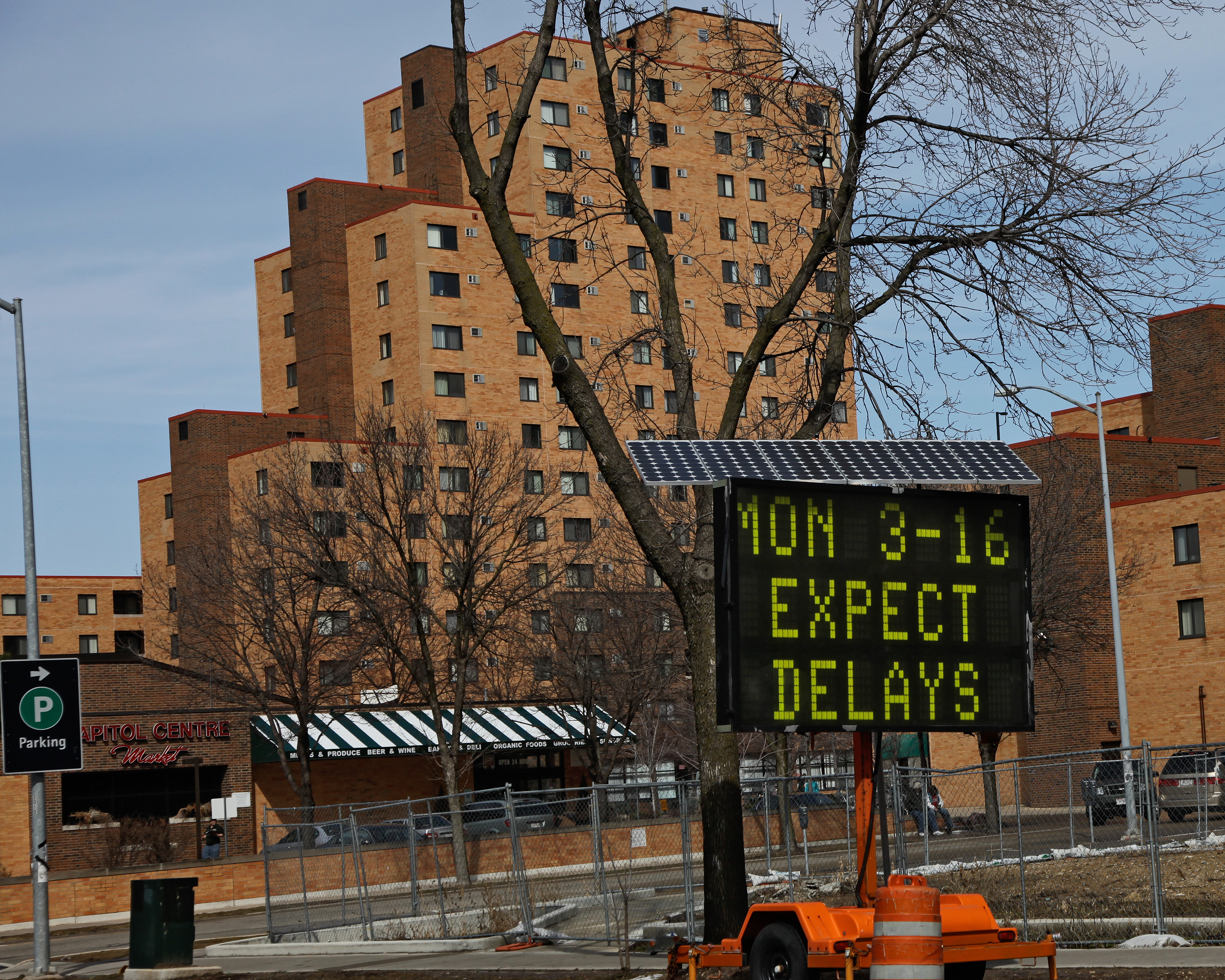
Solar-powered road sign

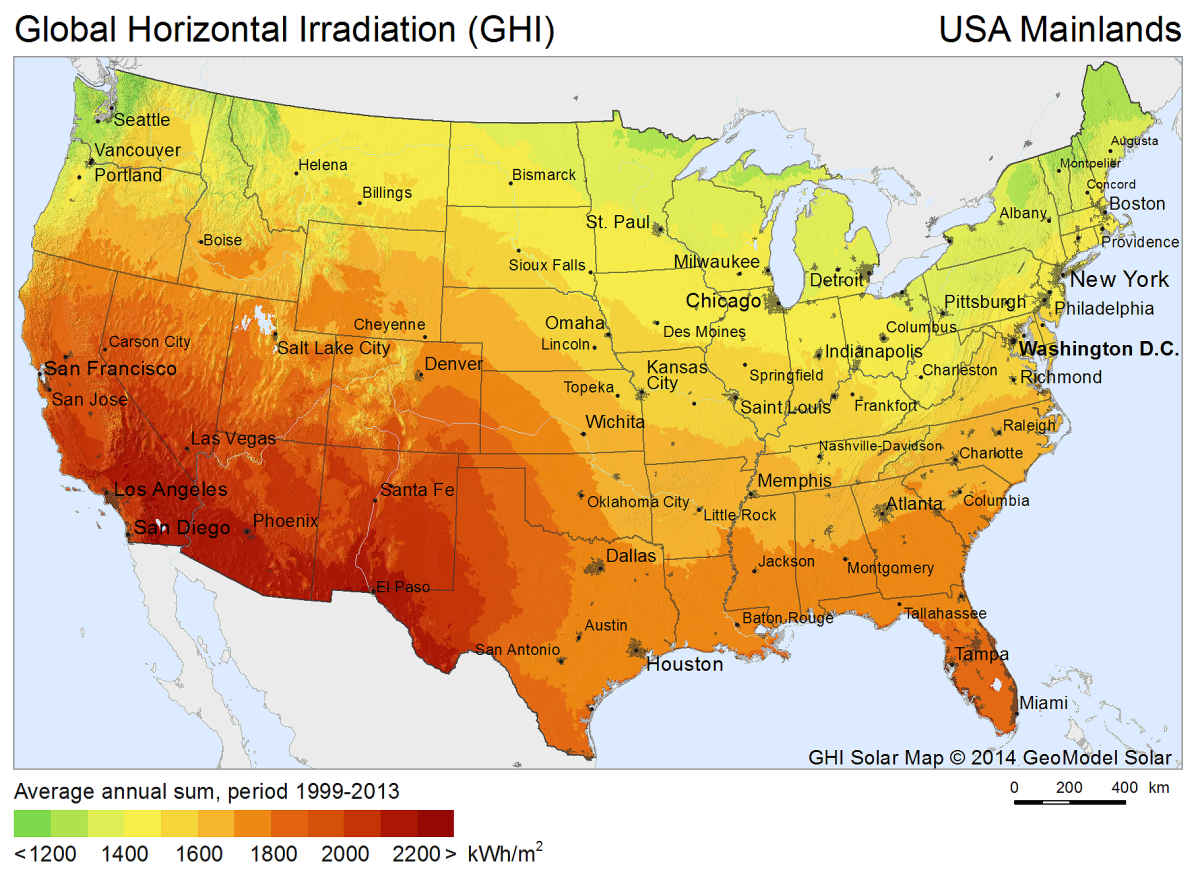
Average solar insolation

Solar power in Wisconsin on rooftops is estimated to be able to provide 40.1% of the electricity used in Wisconsin, using 23,600 MW of solar panels. Net metering is available for systems up to at least 20 kW, and excess generation is credited at retail rate to customers' next bill. Some utilities allow net metering up to 100 kW. For Xcel customers, kilowatt credits are rolled over monthly and are reconciled annually at avoided cost. Best practices recommend no limits, either individually or aggregate, and perpetual rollover of kilowatt credits.

A 2016 estimate indicated that a typical 5 kW solar array installed in Wisconsin would pay for itself in 13 years, and go on to provide an additional profit of $18,860 during its 25-year life. Wisconsin's renewable portfolio standard required 10% renewable sources for electricity by 2015.

== Implications ==
In 2007, Wisconsin's largest solar array was the 44.4 kW array on the Urban Ecology Center in Milwaukee.

In 2011, the largest array was the 360 kW parking lot array in Verona owned by Epic, which is being expanded to 2.2 MW. A 3.177 MW array is planned for a distribution center in Oconomowoc.

In June 2016, the 2.3 MW Rock River solar project near Beloit became the largest solar farm in the state.

The KI convention center located in Green Bay currently (as of 2013) has the largest solar PV installation in Northeastern Wisconsin. The new 115-kilowatt array comprises 480 PV solar panels.

As of May 2014, there are about 2,250 homes powered by solar energy in Wisconsin.

Wisconsin ranks 24th in the nation for the number of solar jobs. Between 2012 and 2014, the state added 800 jobs in the solar industry.

=== Water treatment facilities ===
In Superior, the city's wastewater treatment plant has installed four So-larBee units to provide adequate aeration without the use of the city's 75-hp units. After this installation, the 75-hp blower units can be completely shut off during no-flow periods. As a result, the city of Superior saved $18,000 per month.

== Statistics ==
Wisconsin photovoltaics capacity (MWp)
Year	Capacity	Installed	% change
2007	1.4	0.6	75%
2008	3.1	1.7	121%
2009	5.3	2.1	71%
2010	8.7	3.5	64%
2011	12.9	4.2	48%
2012	21.1	8.2	64%
2013	22.5	1.4	7%
2014	20	2	11%
2015	25	5	25%
2016	30	5	20%
2017	150.2	120.2	400%
2018	165.2	15	9%
2019	209.2	44	26%
2020	442	232.8	111%
2021	837	395	%
2022	1,205	368	%

Source: NREL

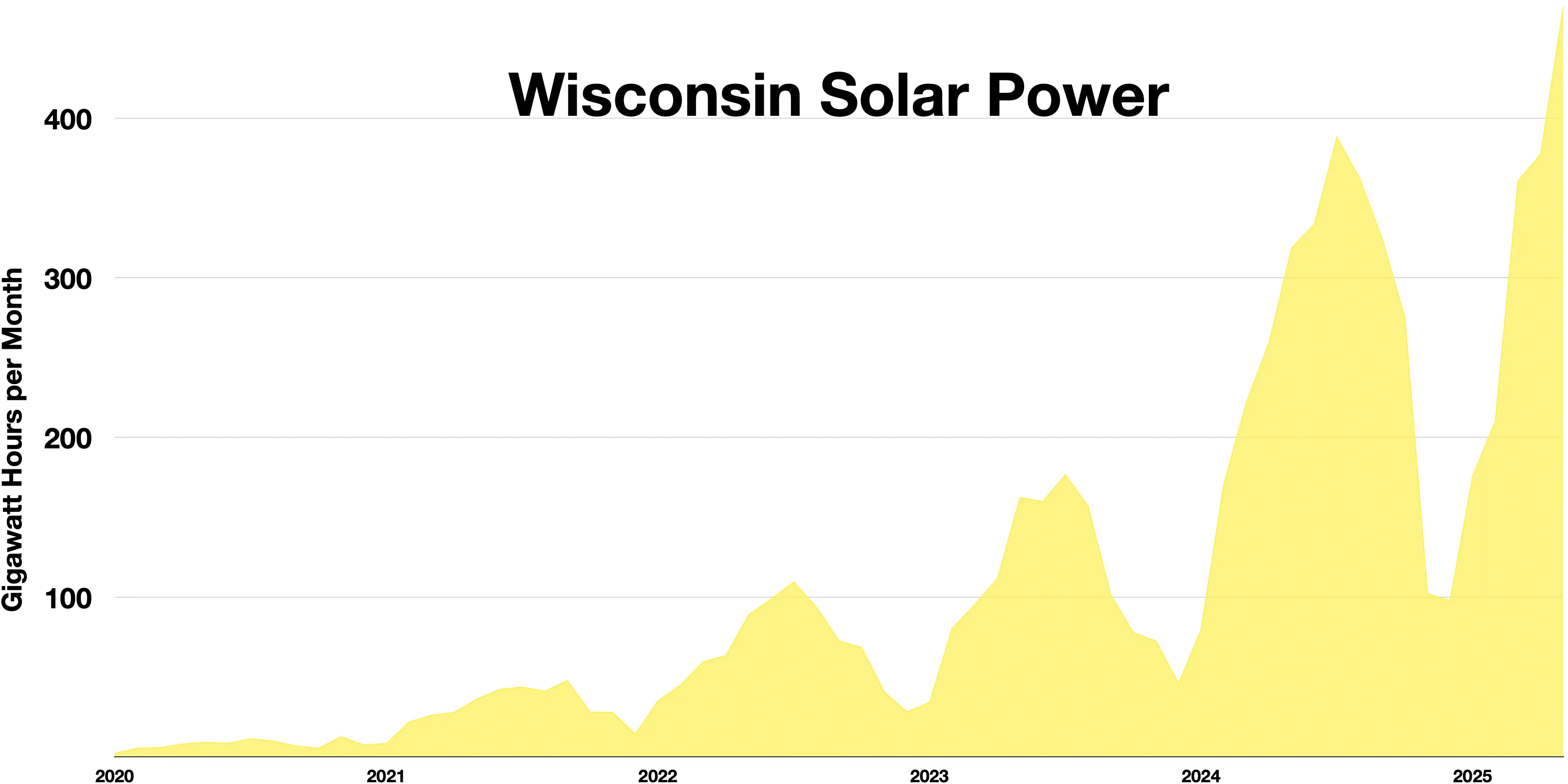
Wisconsin solar power

Utility-scale solar generation in Wisconsin (GWh)
Year	Total	Jan	Feb	Mar	Apr	May	Jun	Jul	Aug	Sep	Oct	Nov	Dec
2017	21	0	1	1	1	2	3	3	3	3	2	1	1
2018	39	2	1	4	4	5	5	5	4	4	3	1	1
2019	37	1	2	3	3	3	4	5	4	4	4	2	2
2020	96	4	5	6	8	9	8	10	9	7	6	14	10
2021	391	11	22	27	29	40	43	44	41	49	33	32	20
2022	147	38	47	62									

== Policies ==
As of 2026, Wisconsin does not have any laws that permit Community solar or Plug-in solar. A bill for community solar was introduced in 2025, but did not become law.

== See also ==
- Wind power in Wisconsin
- Solar power in the United States
- Renewable energy in the United States
