= Jericho, Wisconsin =

Jericho, Wisconsin may refer to the following places in the U.S. state of Wisconsin:

- Jericho, Calumet County, Wisconsin, an unincorporated community
- Jericho, Waukesha County, Wisconsin, an unincorporated community
