= Thomas Commuck =

American composer and historian

Thomas Commuck (January 18, 1804 – November 25, 1855) was an American composer and historian. His 1845 collection Indian Melodies has been described as the first published musical work by a Native American.

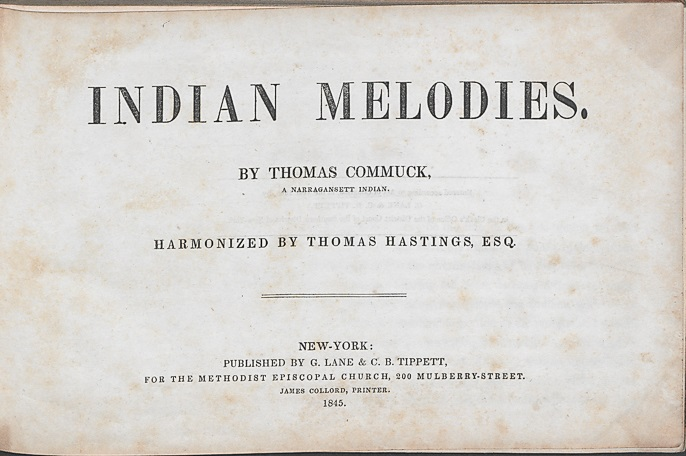
Indian Melodies, 1845

A member of the Narragansett tribe, Commuck was born in Charlestown, Rhode Island. In 1811 he began attending a school sponsored by the Society for Propagating the Gospel among Indians and Others in North America, continuing in attendance off and on through 1814. As a young man he moved to Oneida County, New York, where he joined the community of Mohegans and Pequots later to become known as the Brothertown Indians. In 1831 he married a Pequot woman, Hanna Abner, and with the rest of the Brothertown community moved to Calumet County, Wisconsin. He published a book of original compositions, Indian Melodies, in 1845; the melodies were harmonized by Thomas Hastings. Among the songs in the collection is one which later became known under the title "Lone Pilgrim", rearranged by Benjamin Franklin White and published in the 1850 appendix of The Sacred Harp. The book contains 120 Christian hymns whose titles were taken from the names of Indian chiefs, tribes, and places, none of which bear any relationship to the tunes bearing their names; in the introduction to the volume Commuck states that "[t]his has been done merely as a tribute of respect to the memory of some tribes that are now nearly if not quite extinct; also a mark of courtesy to some tribes with whom the author is acquainted." All are written in the shape note style. The book is one of the earliest written by a Native American to deal specifically with Native American culture.

In Wisconsin Commuck, who lived with his wife in Green Bay, came to occupy a number of important positions within the Brothertown community; he acted as the tribe's postmaster, justice of the peace, and historian, and in 1844 was nominated by the Whig Party to stand as a candidate for the Wisconsin House of Representatives. He wrote a "Sketch of the Brothertown Indians" in a letter to Lyman Draper, secretary of the State Historical Society of Wisconsin; this has been anthologized. He drowned after falling through a hole in the ice near his residence, it has been suggested that his death was not accidental. A project is underway to digitize recordings of the melodies and other documents related to their history, under the auspices of the Yale Indian Papers project.

Edward MacDowell incorporated two of Commuck's works into his music; "Old Indian Hymn" appears in the fifth of the Woodland Sketches, while "Shoshonee" is used in the third movement of the Second "Indian" Suite.
