= Brothertown, Wisconsin =

- Town
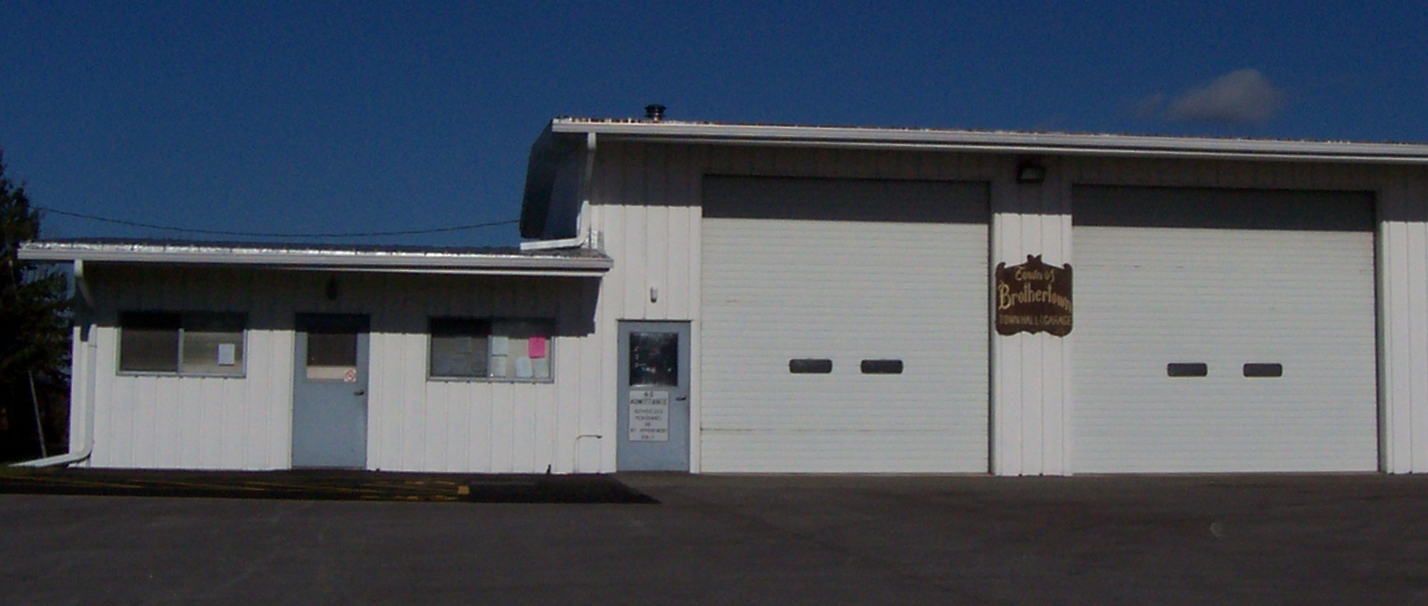
- Town hall

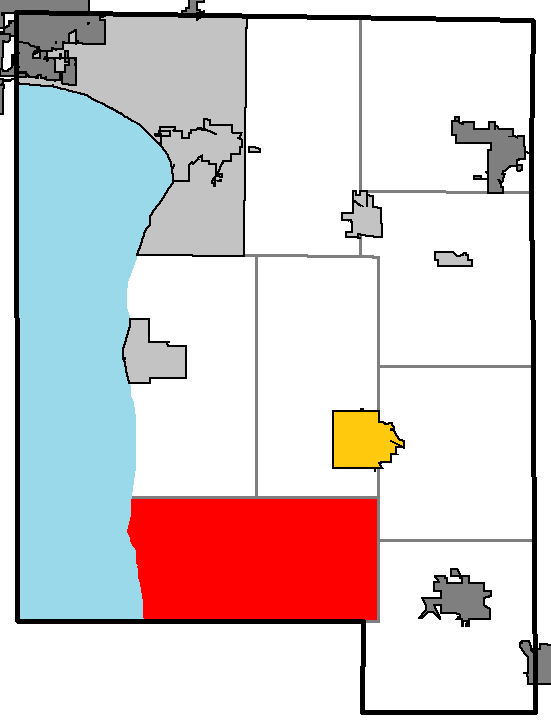
- Location of Brothertown, within Calumet County
- Coordinates: 43°58′28″N 88°15′4″W
- Country: United States
- State: Wisconsin
- County: Calumet

Area
  - Total: 54.5 sq mi (141.2 km^{2})
  - Land: 36.6 sq mi (94.8 km^{2})
  - Water: 17.9 sq mi (46.4 km^{2})
- Elevation: 980 ft (300 m)

Population (2020)
  - Total: 1,328
  - Density: 36.3/sq mi (14.0/km^{2})
- Time zone: UTC-6 (Central (CST))
  - Summer (DST): UTC-5 (CDT)
- Area code: 920
- FIPS code: 55-10350
- GNIS feature ID: 1582873
- Website: https://townofbrothertown.com/

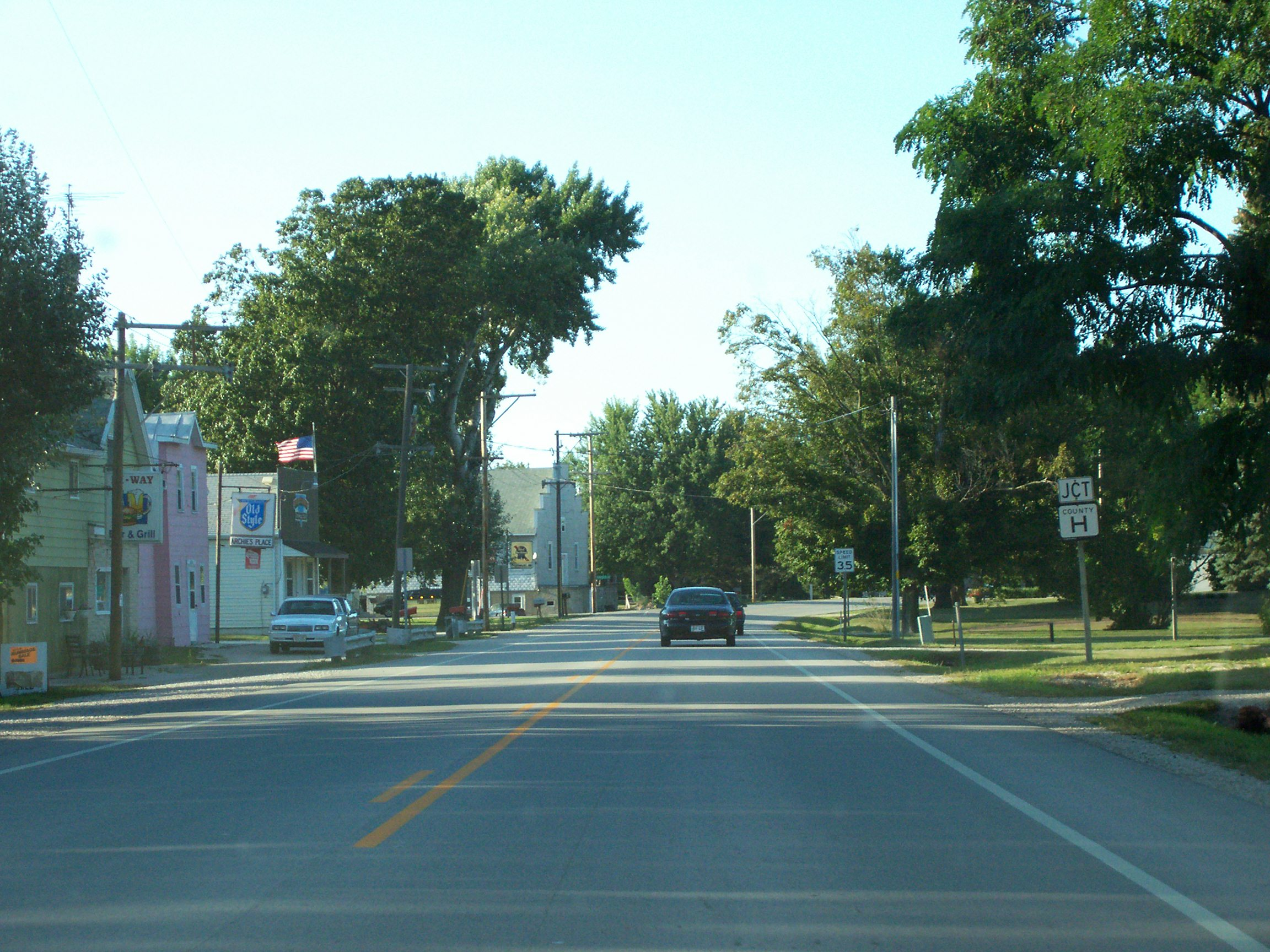
U.S. Route 151 in the unincorporated community of Brothertown, Wisconsin

Brothertown is a town in Calumet County in the U.S. state of Wisconsin. The population was 1,328 at the 2020 census, slightly down from 1,329 at the 2010 census. The unincorporated communities of Brothertown, Charlesburg, Eckers Lakeland, Jericho, and Maple Heights are located in the town. The unincorporated community of Calumetville is also located partially in the town.

== History ==
The town was inhabited by the Brothertown Indians, who moved there from the state of New York from 1831 to 1836. The town was created on March 21, 1843, as "Manchester". There is also record of this town being referred to by name in the early 1850s as Pequot The post office there in 1841 (when the area was still Wisconsin Territory) was called Pequot, and the Pequot post office name still appeared in the 1862 issue of the Wisconsin Blue Book; and "Sequoit". It was renamed "Brothertown" on May 4/May 5, 1857.

== Geography ==
The town occupies the southwest corner of Calumet County, with the western 1/3 of the town in Lake Winnebago. The town is bordered by Winnebago County to the west and Fond du Lac County to the south. U.S. Route 151 crosses the west side of the town, passing through the community of Brothertown. According to the United States Census Bureau, the town has a total area of 54.5 square miles (141.2 km^{2}), of which 36.6 square miles (94.8 km^{2}) is land and 17.9 square miles (46.4 km^{2}), or 32.83%, is water.

== Demographics ==
As of the census of 2000, there were 1,404 people, 523 households, and 380 families residing in the town. The population density was 38.2 people per square mile (14.7/km^{2}). There were 627 housing units at an average density of 17.0 per square mile (6.6/km^{2}). The racial makeup of the town was 99.79% White, 0.07% African American, 0.07% Native American, and 0.07% from two or more races. Hispanic or Latino of any race were 0.36% of the population.

There were 523 households, out of which 33.3% had children under the age of 18 living with them, 63.3% were married couples living together, 4.2% had a female householder with no husband present, and 27.2% were non-families. 23.1% of all households were made up of individuals, and 8.0% had someone living alone who was 65 years of age or older. The average household size was 2.68 and the average family size was 3.19.

In the town, the population was spread out, with 27.3% under the age of 18, 7.7% from 18 to 24, 29.8% from 25 to 44, 23.7% from 45 to 64, and 11.5% who were 65 years of age or older. The median age was 37 years. For every 100 females, there were 109.6 males. For every 100 females age 18 and over, there were 119.1 males.

The median income for a household in the town was $49,861, and the median income for a family was $58,083. Males had a median income of $36,929 versus $25,625 for females. The per capita income for the town was $19,816. About 1.0% of families and 1.6% of the population were below the poverty line, including 1.3% of those under age 18 and 3.9% of those age 65 or over.

== Government ==
As of 2008, the town chairman is Jeanold Puetz.

== Education ==
The town lies in the New Holstein/Moraine Park Technical College and Chilton/Fox Valley Technical College school districts.

== Media ==
The official newspaper of the town is the Chilton Times-Journal. Notices are published at the town hall on St. Charles Road, Pete's Fisherman's Inn in Brothertown and outside the former Roman Catholic Church in Charlesburg.
