= Calumetville, Wisconsin =

- Unincorporated community
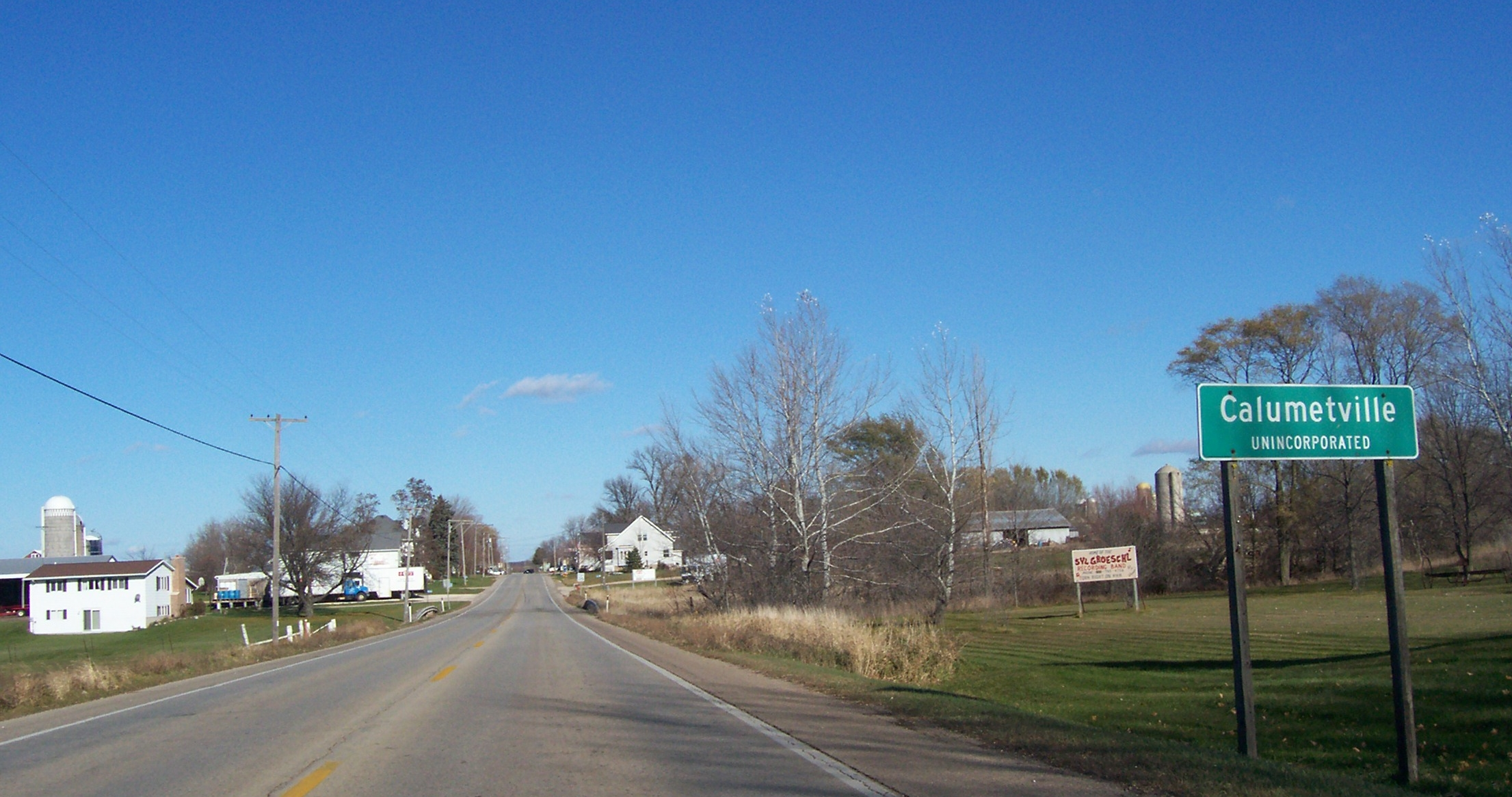
- Looking north at the south side of Calumetville

- Location within Wisconsin Location within the United States
- Coordinates: 43°56′10″N 88°18′12″W
- Country: United States
- State: Wisconsin
- Counties: Fond du Lac, Calumet
- Towns: Calumet, Brothertown
- Elevation: 801 ft (244 m)
- Time zone: UTC-6 (Central (CST))
  - Summer (DST): UTC-5 (CDT)
- Zip codes: 53049, 53014
- Area code: 920
- GNIS feature ID: 1562524

Calumetville is an unincorporated community that straddles the county line between Calumet and Fond du Lac counties in Wisconsin, United States. The main part of the community in Fond du Lac County lies in the town of Calumet, and the section in Calumet County lies in the town of Brothertown.

Calumetville is located at the intersection of U.S. Route 151 and County Highway HHH. Route 151 was once an old military road running from Fond du Lac to Green Bay. Lake Winnebago lies less than one mile to the west. Pipe lies 1.6 miles (2.6 km) to the south, and Brothertown is 2.3 miles (3.7 km) to the north.

== Local attractions ==
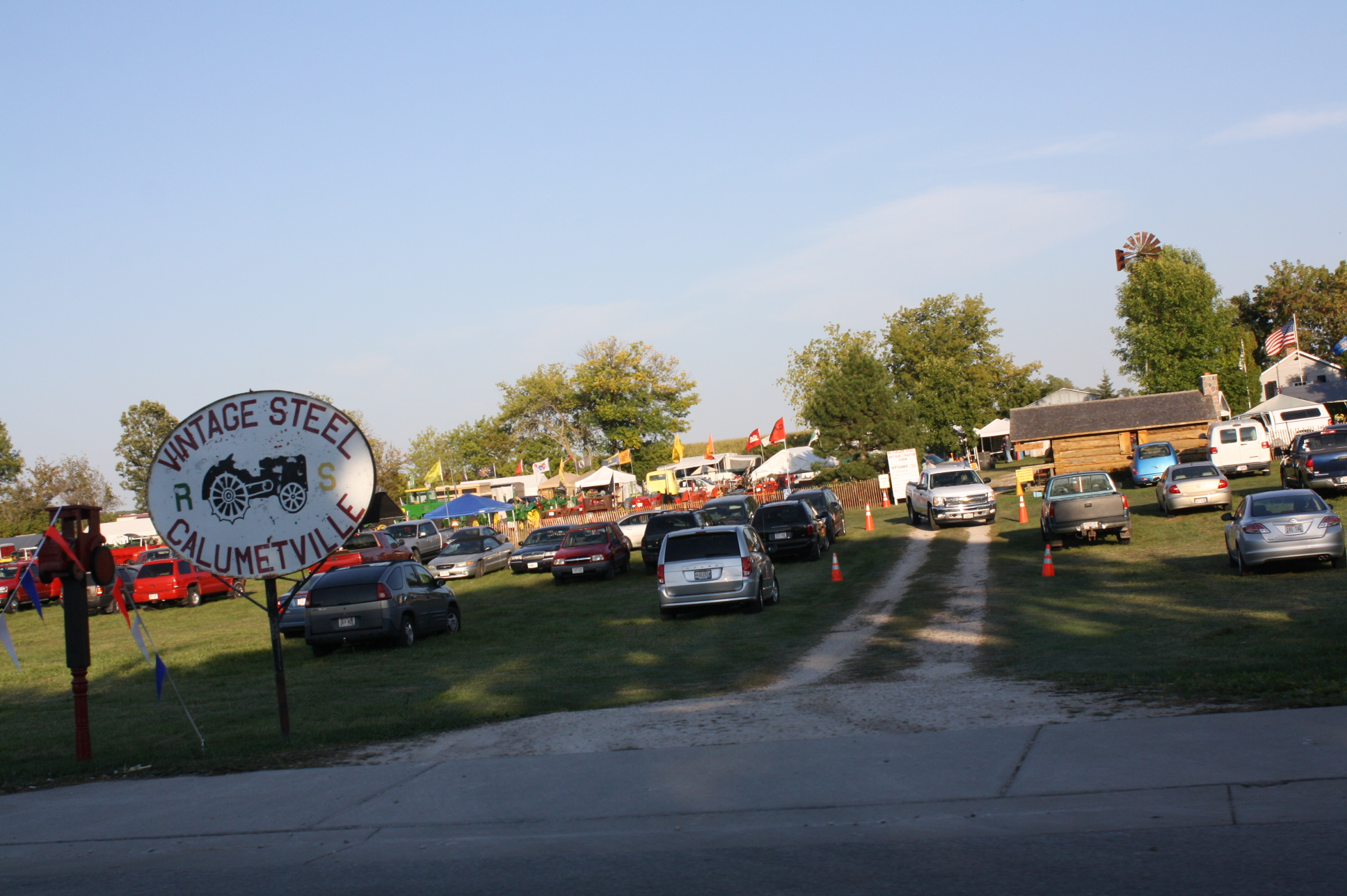
2012 Vintage Steel show

Cedar Lodge is a very popular restaurant which draws customers from the surrounding area.

Calumetville hosts an annual vintage gas and steam engine show which is held at the RS Vintage Steel grounds. The event features rock crushing, threshing, log-sawing, and blacksmithing. Photographs showing the local history of the area are also displayed.

== History ==
The community first settled and platted by George White in 1838. White's home was one of the first three election sites in Fond du Lac County. At its height, Calumetville rivaled Fond du Lac as a commercial center. There had been a butcher, a doctor or two, a reception hall, a post office, a couple harness shops, a couple blacksmiths, a hotel, a Turner Hall, and a school. In the 1950s and 1960s there had been two grocery & hardware stores, two gas stations, and two taverns.

In 2009 during a road construction project on Highway 151 in Calumetville, human bones were found. The bones are of a young adult and are believed to be part of an ancient burial site. Construction was delayed to allow for additional excavation of the burial site.

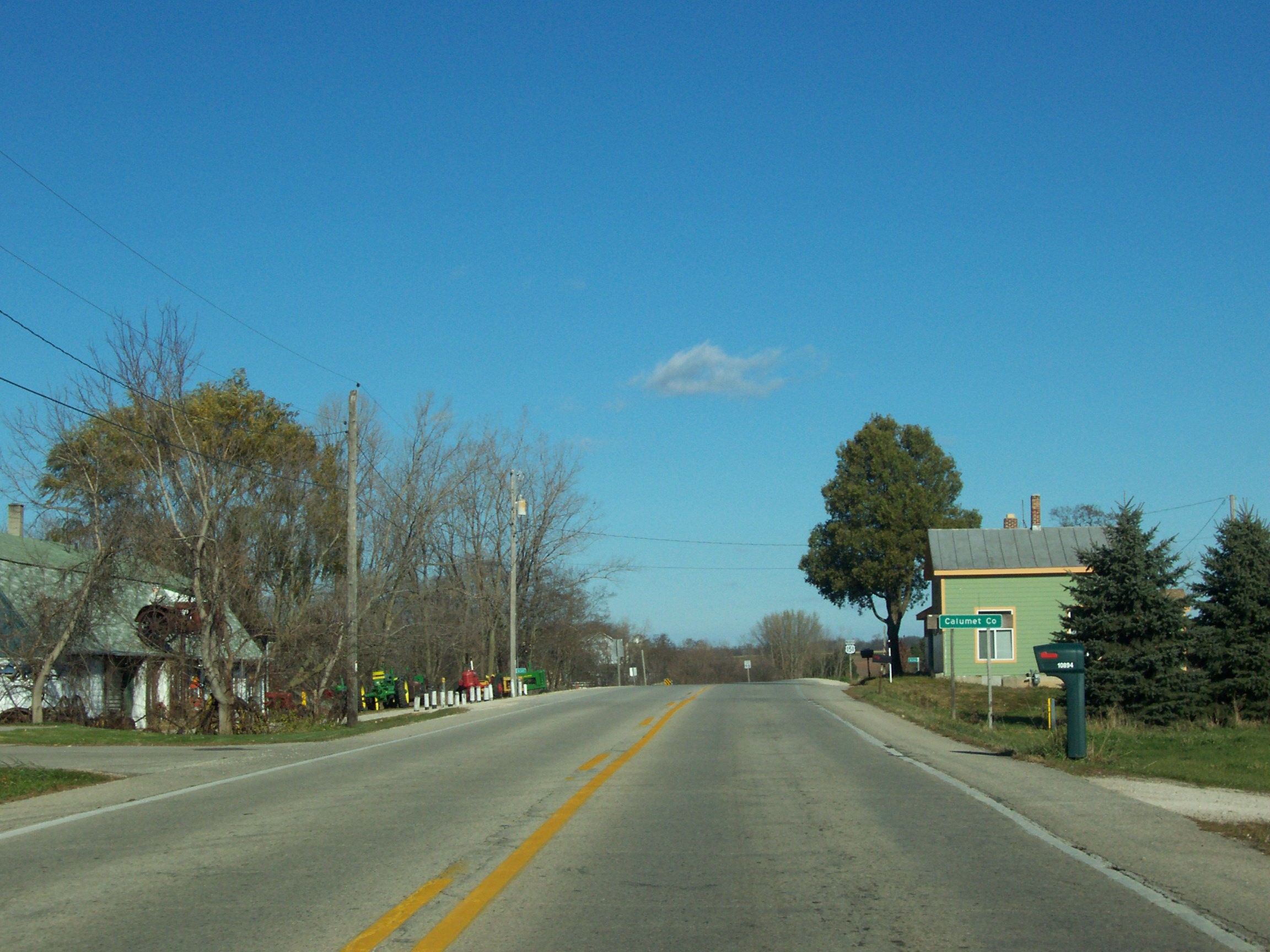
Looking north at the portion in Calumet County
