= Brothertown Indians =

Native American tribe in Wisconsin

- Flag of the Brothertown Indians

Total population
- 4000 enrolled (as of 2013)

Regions with significant populations
- United States, (Wisconsin)

Languages
- English, formerly Mohegan-Pequot language

Religion
- Christianity

Related ethnic groups
- Mohegan, Pequot, Narragansett, Montauk

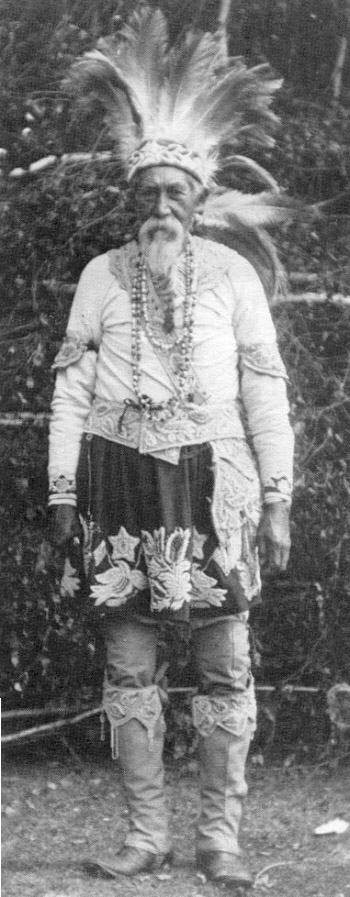
Lester Skeesuk (Brothertown Indian), ca. 1920

The Brothertown Indians (also Brotherton), located in Wisconsin, are a Native American tribe formed in the late 18th century from communities descended from Pequot, Narragansett, Montauk, Tunxis, Niantic, and Mohegan (Algonquian-speaking) tribes of southern New England and eastern Long Island, New York. In the 1780s after the American Revolutionary War, they were forced to migrate from New England into New York state, where they accepted land from the Oneida nation of the Haudenosaunee in Oneida County.

Under pressure from the United States government, the Brothertown Indians, together with the Stockbridge-Munsee and some Oneida, were removed to Wisconsin in the 1830s, mainly walking from New York State, though some also took ships through the Great Lakes. In 1839 they were the first tribe of Native Americans in the United States to accept United States citizenship and allotment of their communal land to individual households, in order to prevent another removal further west and other prosecution. Most of the neighboring Oneida and many of the Lenape (Delaware) were removed to Indian Territory (present-day Oklahoma) in this period.

Seeking to regain federal recognition, the Brothertown Indians filed a documented petition in 2005. The Bureau of Indian Affairs (BIA) notified the tribe in 2009 that the 1839 act granting the Brothertown United States citizenship and dissolving their communal reservation land, had effectively terminated the people as a sovereign tribe. In September 2012, in the final determination on the Brothertown petition, the acting Assistant Secretary determined that the group previously had a relationship with the United States, but had its tribal status terminated by the 1839 act which could only be restored by a new act of Congress. Because Brothertown could not satisfy mandatory criteria for federal acknowledgment, the Department did not look to the other criteria in making its final determination. The Brothertown Indians are continuing to pursue federal recognition.

The Brothertown Indians are one of twelve tribes residing in Wisconsin and the only one that does not have federal recognition. The tribe is estimated to have more than 4,000 members as of 2013.

== History ==
=== Tribe forms in New England ===
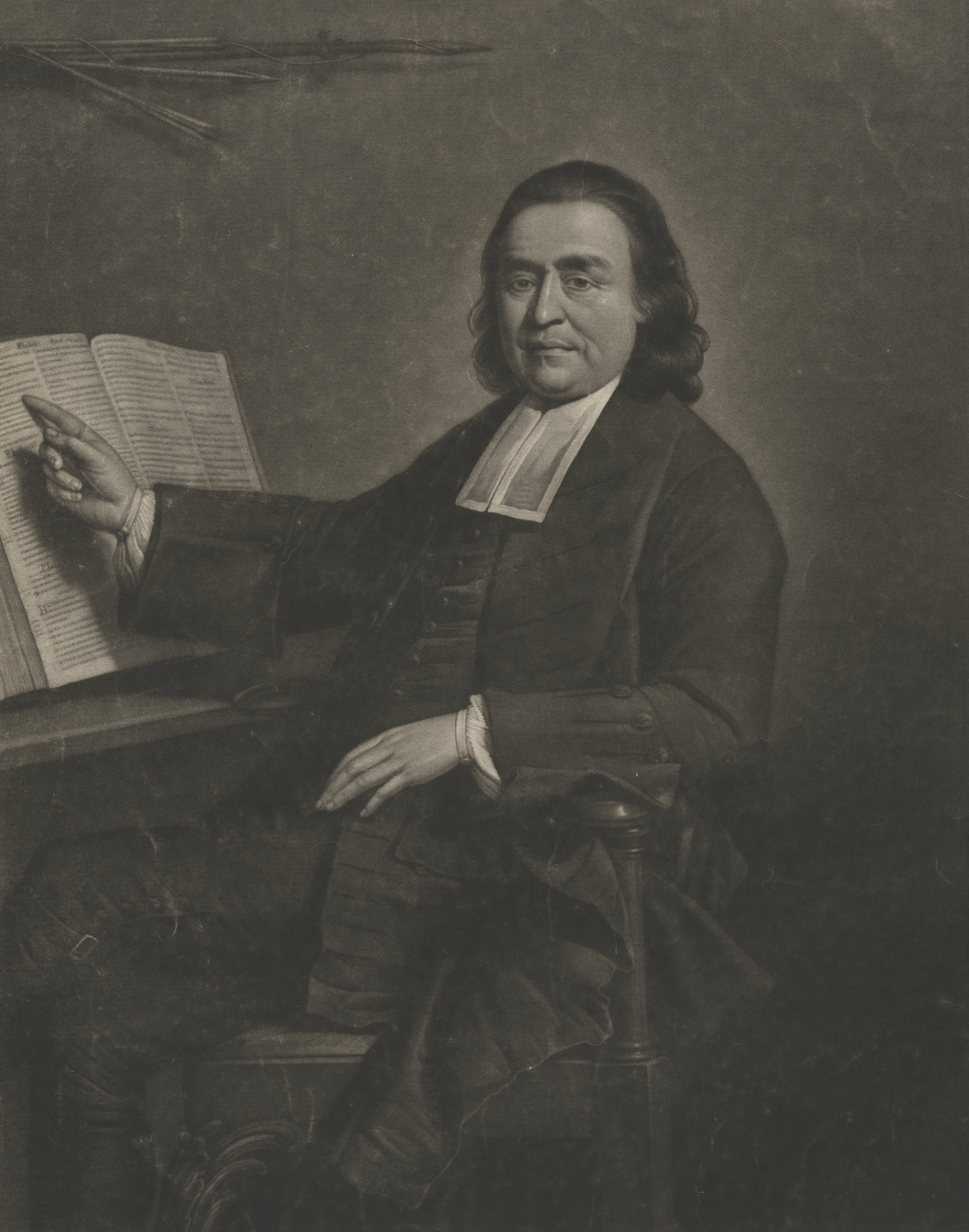
The Reverend Samson Occom, founder of the Brothertown Indian Nation

The Brothertown Indian Nation (Eeyamquittoowauconnuck) was formed by three leaders of the Mohegan and Pequot tribes of New England and eastern Long Island: Samson Occom (Mohegan/Brothertown), a notable Presbyterian minister to New England Indians and fundraiser for Moor's Indian Charity School—although funds Occom raised for this school were used by Wheelock to found Dartmouth College; his son-in-law Joseph Johnson (Mohegan), who was a messenger for General George Washington during the American Revolution; and Occom's brother-in-law David Fowler (Montauk, Pequot). They organized as a new tribe the numerous remnant peoples who had survived the disruption of disease, colonialism and warfare, including some Narragansett and Montauk.

After the American Revolutionary War, the tribe formally organized on November 7, 1785 and included members of tribes from Massachusetts, Connecticut, Rhode Island and Long Island, New York. These included people of Mohegan, Pequot at Groton, Connecticut; Pequot at Stonington, Connecticut; Narragansett, Niantic, and Tunxis (Farmington) tribes on New England, and the Montauk (also a Pequot band) of Long Island though other members of these communities chose to remain as intact Nations. Under pressure from the victorious American settlers to move west, they began to migrate in the 1780s to land provided to them by the Oneida Nation of the Haudenosaunee in Marshall, New York (near Waterville, in Oneida County), where they formalized their new status. As allies to the Patriots, the Oneida were allowed to stay in New York on a small reservation. Due to hostilities aroused by four of the Haudenosaunee nations having allied with the British during the war, and continuing land hunger by new settlers, New York and the United States governments pressured the tribes to remove west of the Mississippi River.

By the 1830s, the Brothertown Indian Nation sold its land to the state of New York and purchased land in Wisconsin; where the 4000+ member tribe thrives in twenty-first century America.

=== Treaties to move west ===
In 1818 members of the Brothertown Indian tribe, Isaac Wobby and Jacob Dick, were granted reservations in what is now Delaware County, Indiana by the Treaty with the Delawares made at St. Mary's. They were accompanied to the treaty negotiations by Thomas Dean, a manager of Indian affairs in Oneida County, New York. Dean was attempting to resettle the Brothertown Indians on lands where their presence would be tolerated. However, these reservations were soon owned by Goldsmith Gilbert, business man who founded Muncie, Indiana.

In 1821, numerous New York tribes signed a treaty with the federal government and acquired 860,000 acres (3,500 km^{2}) in Wisconsin. In 1822, another delegation acquired an additional 6,720,000 acres (27,200 km^{2}), which consisted of almost the entire western shore of Lake Michigan. The Brothertown Indians were to receive about 153,000 acres (620 km^{2}) along the southeastern side of the Fox River near present-day Kaukauna and Wrightstown. Some of the other tribes included in the 1821 treaty felt they were misled by the federal government. The treaty was hotly debated for eight years, and was never ratified by the United States Senate.

The federal government mediated a settlement with three treaties signed in 1831 and 1832. The settlement with the Brothertown consisted of exchanging the formerly agreed-upon lands for the 23,040 acres (93 km^{2}) now referred to as the entire town of Brothertown in Calumet County along the east shore of Lake Winnebago.

=== Tribe moves west to Wisconsin ===
The Brothertown leadership led the move west so they could live in peace away from European-American influences. The Brothertown joined their neighbors, some of the Oneida tribe and the Stockbridge-Munsee, in planning the move to Wisconsin. Five groups of Brothertown people arrived in Wisconsin on ships at the port of Green Bay between 1831 and 1836, after having traveled across the Great Lakes. Upon arrival, the Brothertown cleared their communal land and began farming, after building a church near Jericho. They also created a settlement called Eeyamquittoowauconnuck, which they later renamed as Brothertown. Finding that their land was fertile, the federal government soon proposed to move the Brothertown west to Indian Territory in present-day Kansas, as authorized under the Indian Removal Act.

In 1834, the Brothertown Indian Nation requested U.S. citizenship and allotment of land by individual title to tribal members (the land had been considered tribal property) in order to avoid being forced to move west again. On March 3, 1839, Congress passed an act granting the Brothertown Indians U.S. citizenship, making them the first Indians to acquire it formally. One member, William Fowler served in the Territorial Legislative Assembly of the Wisconsin Territory; two others, Alonzo Dick and William H. Dick, served in the Wisconsin State Assembly, the first non-whites to do so. Several tribal members held office in Calumet County, even after the Brothertown ceased to be a majority in that county. Although William H. Dick was elected to the State legislature again in 1871, after that year Brothertown Indians were active in politics only at the local civil township level.

The tribe did not give up their sovereignty for citizenship. The Bureau of Indian Affairs has repeatedly confirmed that U.S. citizenship and sovereignty are not mutually exclusive. All Native Americans are now U.S. citizens, yet the federal government has acknowledged 574 tribes. In 1878, the federal government met with the Brothertown leaders. It proposed that the tribe should release land in the former reservation that had not been allocated to individual households; the federal government intended to sell it to German immigrants settling in Wisconsin.

== Federal recognition status ==
=== Termination policy ===
As part of the Indian termination policy that the US government adopted in the late 1940s and applied into the 1960s, it identified several former New York tribes for termination, with the thought they no longer needed a special relationship with the federal government. A January 21, 1954 memo by the Department of the Interior advised that a bill for termination was being prepared including "about 3,600 members of the Oneida Tribe residing in Wisconsin. Another memo of the Department of the Interior memo, entitled "Indian Claims Commission Awards Over $38.5 Million to Indian Tribes in 1964," states that the so-called Emigrant Indians of New York are "now known as the Oneidas, Stockbridge-Munsee, and Brotherton Indians of Wisconsin".

In an effort to fight termination and force the government into recognizing their outstanding land claims from New York, the three tribes began filing litigation in the 1950s. As a result of a claim filed with the Indian Claims Commission, the group was awarded a settlement of $1,313,472.65 on August 11, 1964. To distribute the funds, Congress passed Public Law 90-93 81 Stat. 229 Emigrant New York Indians of Wisconsin Judgment Act, and prepared separate rolls of persons in each of the three groups to determine which tribal members had at least one-quarter "Emigrant New York Indian blood." It directed tribal governing bodies of the Oneida and Stockbridge-Munsee to apply to the Secretary of the Interior for approval of fund distributions, thereby ending termination efforts for these tribes. With regard to the Brothertown Indians, however, though the law did not specifically state they were terminated, it authorized all payments to be made directly to each enrollee, with special provisions for minors to be handled by the Secretary, though the payments were not subject to state or federal taxes. Part of the settlement required each of the tribes to update their membership rolls.

=== Restoration ===
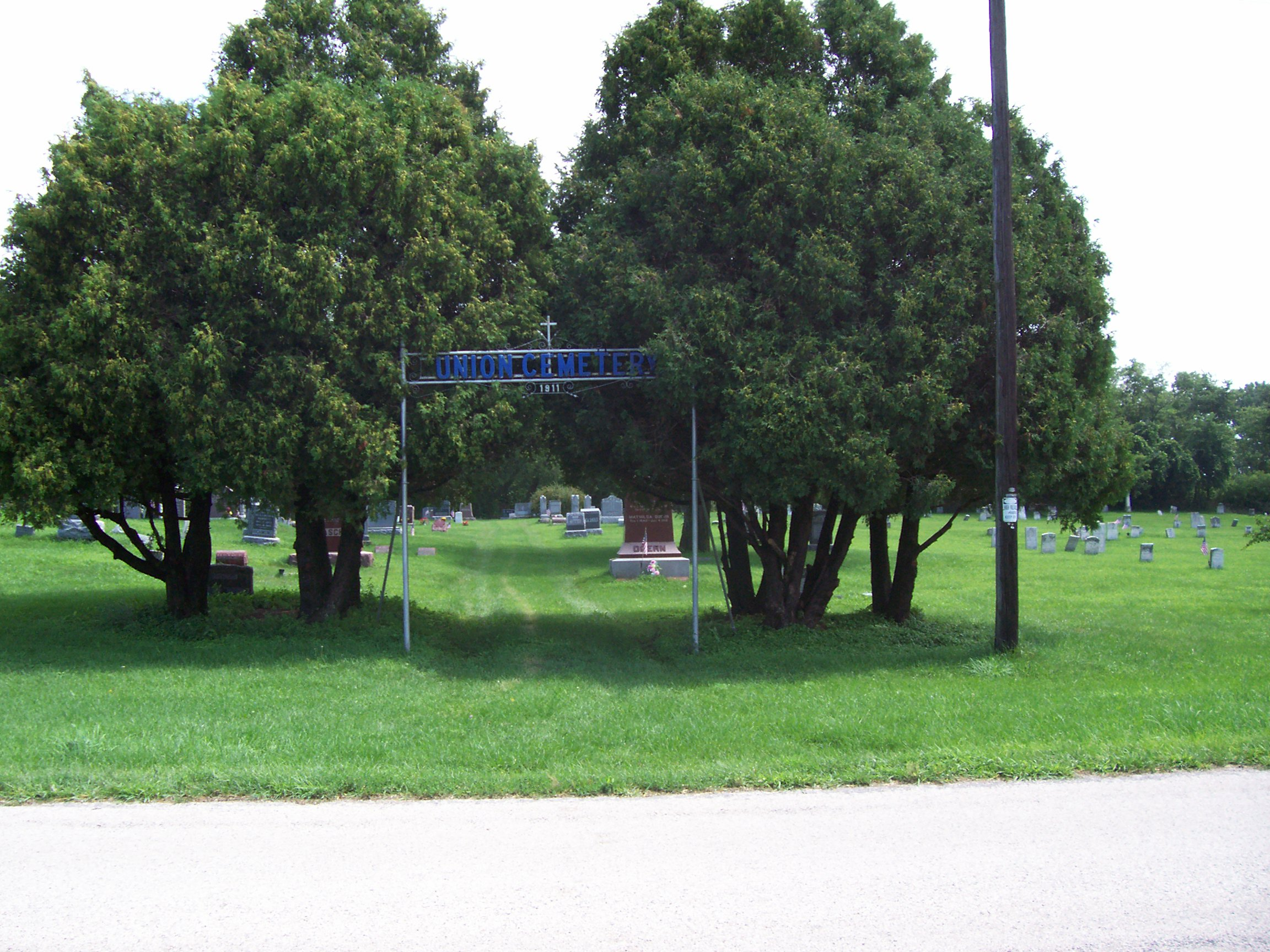
Union Cemetery, in the town of Brothertown, Wisconsin

In 1978, the federal government developed guidelines for tribes who lost recognition under the termination policy in order to allow them to regain federal recognition. The Brothertown submitted its first petition of intent that year to gain federal recognition as a tribe, in order to be able to provide for people who live away from their small reservation, as well as to have status among federally recognized tribes. They want to establish historical records for their people as well. They contend they have maintained cultural identity and continuity, as well as political government.

In 1993 the Bureau of Indian Affairs (BIA) acknowledged that the Brothertown Indians had been recognized as a sovereign tribe by the federal government in provisos to treaties of 1831 and 1832, and in the 1839 act granting them citizenship and allocation of lands in Wisconsin. The Office of the Solicitor of the Department of Interior confirmed in writing to the tribe that the Brothertown Indian Nation was eligible to petition the BIA for federal recognition, a process that the tribe has been pursuing. Had Congress's granting of citizenship status stripped the Brothertown Indian Nation of its federal acknowledgment in 1839, the tribe would have been deemed ineligible for the BIA's federal acknowledgment process (25 CFR sec. 83), and only an act of Congress could give the tribe federal acknowledgment. Based on the BIA's ruling, the Brothertown Indians spent several years compiling the data required to petition for federal recognition from the Department of Interior's BIA and submitted a detailed petition in 2005.

In 2009, the Brothertown Indians were notified by the BIA of the preliminary finding that they did not satisfy five of the seven criteria for recognition. More importantly, the BIA reinterpreted its 1993 policy memo, and said in a press release that the tribe lost its federal status by the 1839 Congressional act:

Congress, in the act of 1839, brought federal recognition of the relationship with the Brothertown Indian tribe of Wisconsin to an end. By expressly denying the Brothertown of Wisconsin any federal recognition of a right to act as a tribal political entity, Congress has forbidden the federal government from acknowledging the Brothertown as a government and from having a government-to-government relationship with the Brothertown as an Indian tribe.

In September 2012, in the final determination on the Brothertown petition, the acting Assistant Secretary determined that the group previously had a relationship with the United States, but had its tribal status terminated by an 1839 Act of Congress. Because Brothertown could not satisfy one of the seven mandatory criteria for federal acknowledgment, the Department did not look to the other criteria in making its final determination. The acting Assistant Secretary noted that only Congress may restore the tribal status of Brothertown and thus its government-to-government relationship with the United States.

The Brothertown Council and Recognition/Restoration committee have developed a strategic plan to lobby politicians from the local town level up through Congress to regain tribal status. In an ongoing effort to regain recognition, the tribe asked the Town Board of Brothertown, Wisconsin for support. In a vote held on December 27, 2013, the town refused to endorse a plan to seek Congressional approval.

== Governance ==
Enrolled members of the Brothertown Indian Nation elect tribal officers, and its tribal council meets monthly. They have bought back a small portion of their former reservation in Wisconsin and function with some degree of self-government in the state of Wisconsin. As individual Native Americans, members who satisfy federal blood quantum rules have certain rights and may gain some federal assistance, such as scholarships available to some Native Americans. The lack of federal recognition reduces their access to certain programs.

== Culture ==
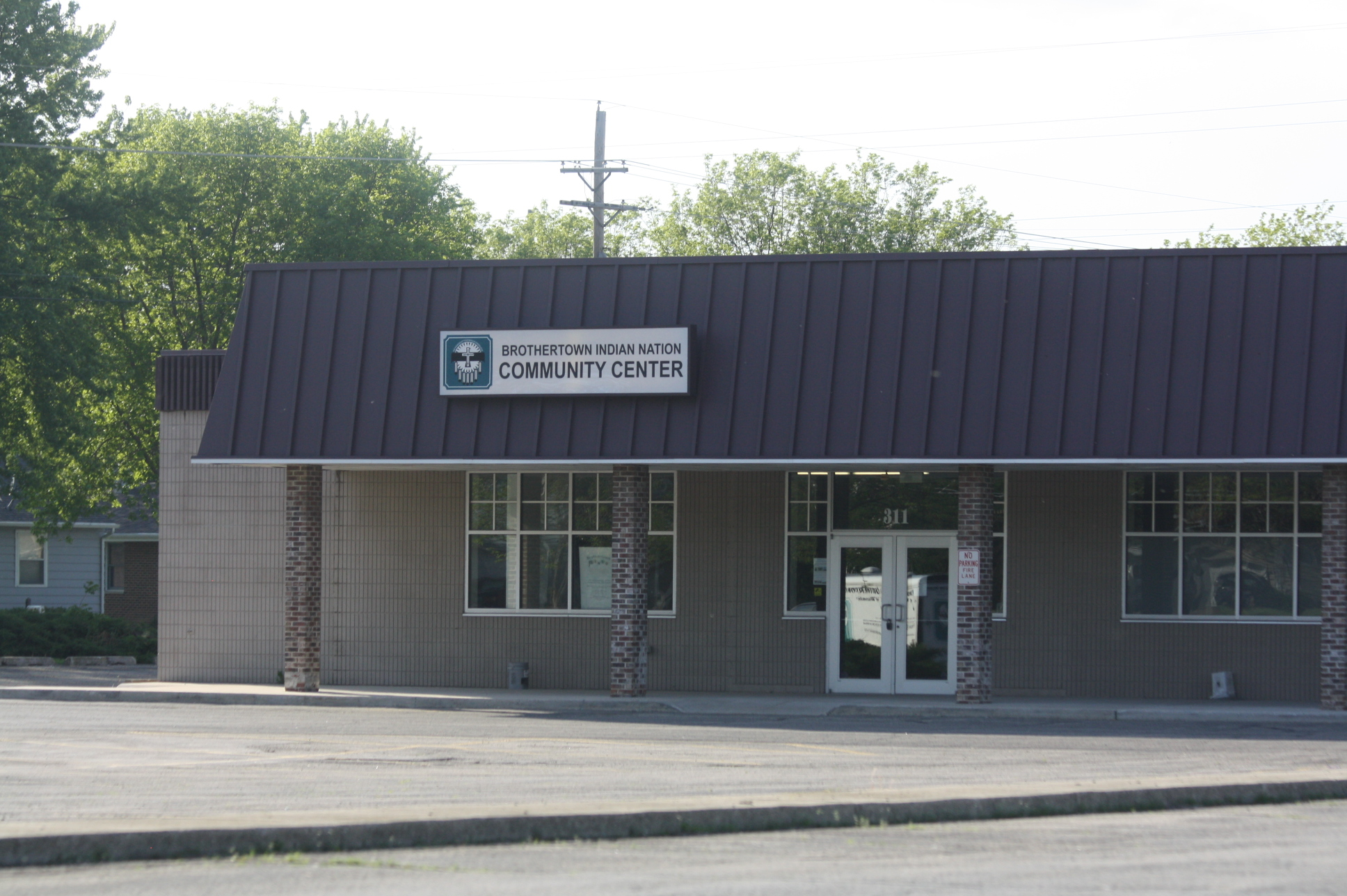
Community center in Fond du Lac

The Brothertown Indian Nation remain a culturally distinct Indian community, with the largest concentration residing in the Fond du Lac, Wisconsin area. In 1999 the nation had about 2400 enrolled members. Tribe councilwoman Dr. Faith Ottery estimates that, as of 2013, there are approximately 4000 members enrolled in the tribe. She estimated about 1,800 reside in Wisconsin with 50% within 50 miles (80 km) of the original reservation and about 80% within about 80 miles (130 km). Some tribe members own land within the 1842–45 original reservation boundaries.

Brothertown members hold their Annual Powwow the first Saturday in April as well as a picnic in July and their Homecoming gathering the third Saturday in October. Many Brothertown Indians have been buried at Union Cemetery in the town of Brothertown, and Quinney Cemetery located just outside the former reservation boundary. Brothertowners return to these grave sites yearly to honor their ancestors and tend to the burial sites. The tribe recently purchased a renovated one-room school house on a plot of land located near existing Brothertown, Wisconsin. The Brothertown Indian Nation Cultural Center is located at N1866 US-151, Chilton, WI 53014.

=== Archaeological project ===
In 2007, the Brothertown Indian Nation supported the archaeologist Craig Cipolla of the University of Pennsylvania to begin an archaeological survey and excavation on historic Brothertown sites in Wisconsin. He is conducting outreach to gain community involvement by Brothertown members and local landowners. The goal of the project is to locate, map and explore sites in need of preservation.

== Notable members ==
- Thomas Commuck (1804-1855), whose 1845 collection Indian Melodies has been described as the first published musical work by a Native American.
