= Charlesburg, Wisconsin =

- Unincorporated community
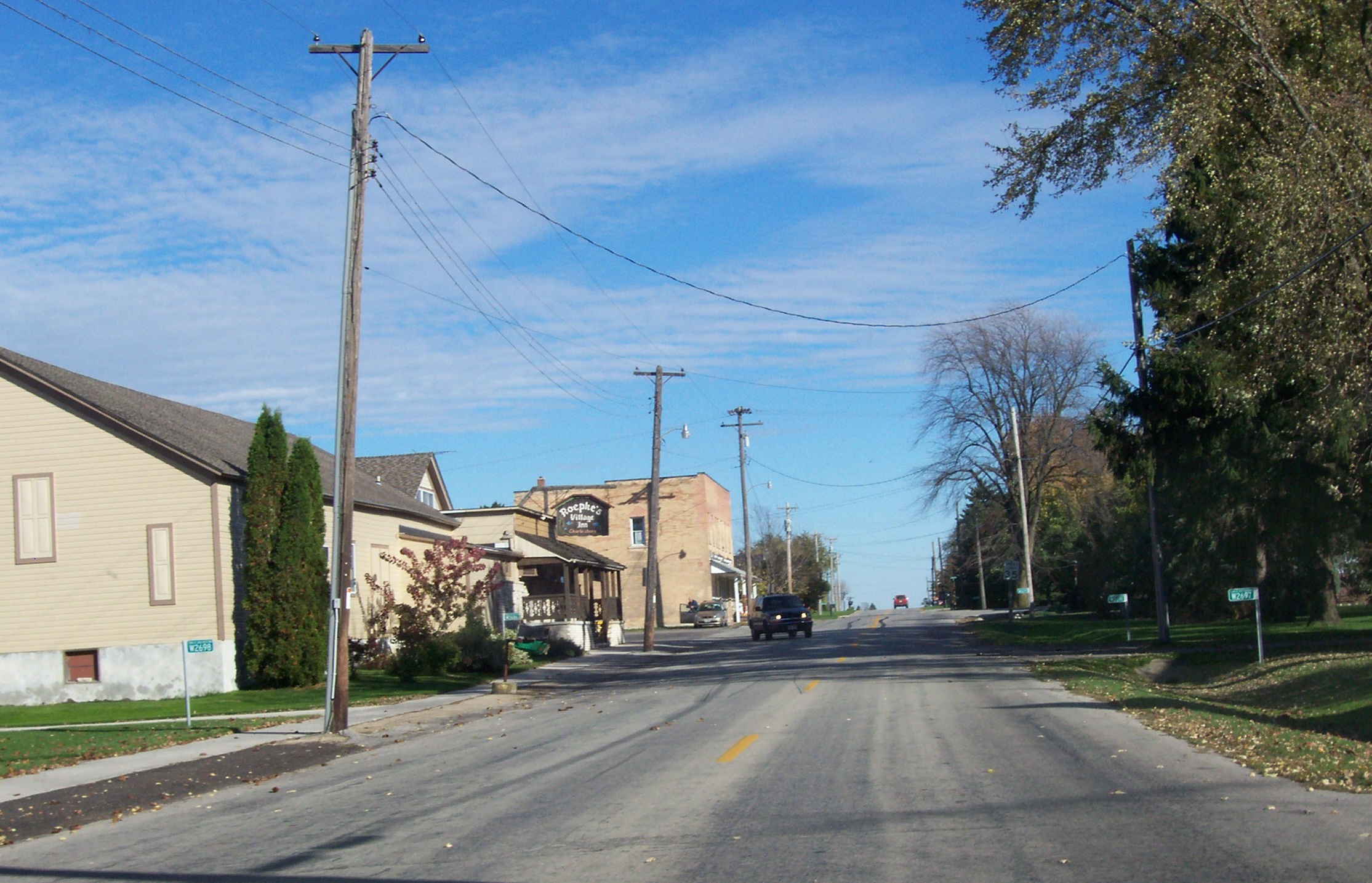
- Downtown Charlesburg

- Location within the state of Wisconsin
- Coordinates: 43°58′11″N 88°10′12″W
- Country: United States
- State: Wisconsin
- County: Calumet
- Town: Brothertown
- Established: 1855
- Time zone: UTC-6 (Central (CST))
  - Summer (DST): UTC-5 (CDT)
- Area code: 920

Charlesburg (also Charlesburgh) is an unincorporated community in the town of Brothertown in Calumet County, Wisconsin, United States.

== History ==
Charlesburg was settled in 1855. The first settler was probably Anton Reinl, an immigrant from Bohemia which was then part of Austrian Empire. Other early settlers were Raymond Lodes, Joseph Nadler, and Joseph Fisher. They spoke a dialect of German.

One of the landmarks in the community is its Catholic Church, called St. Charles Church. It opened in 1866 and closed in 2005.

== Location ==
Charlesburg is located on St. Charles Road at its intersection with Washington Road. It is considered part of the Holyland region in southern Calumet County.

== Notable residents ==
- Aloysius Leitner, military
- William Morgan, Wisconsin Attorney General

== Images ==
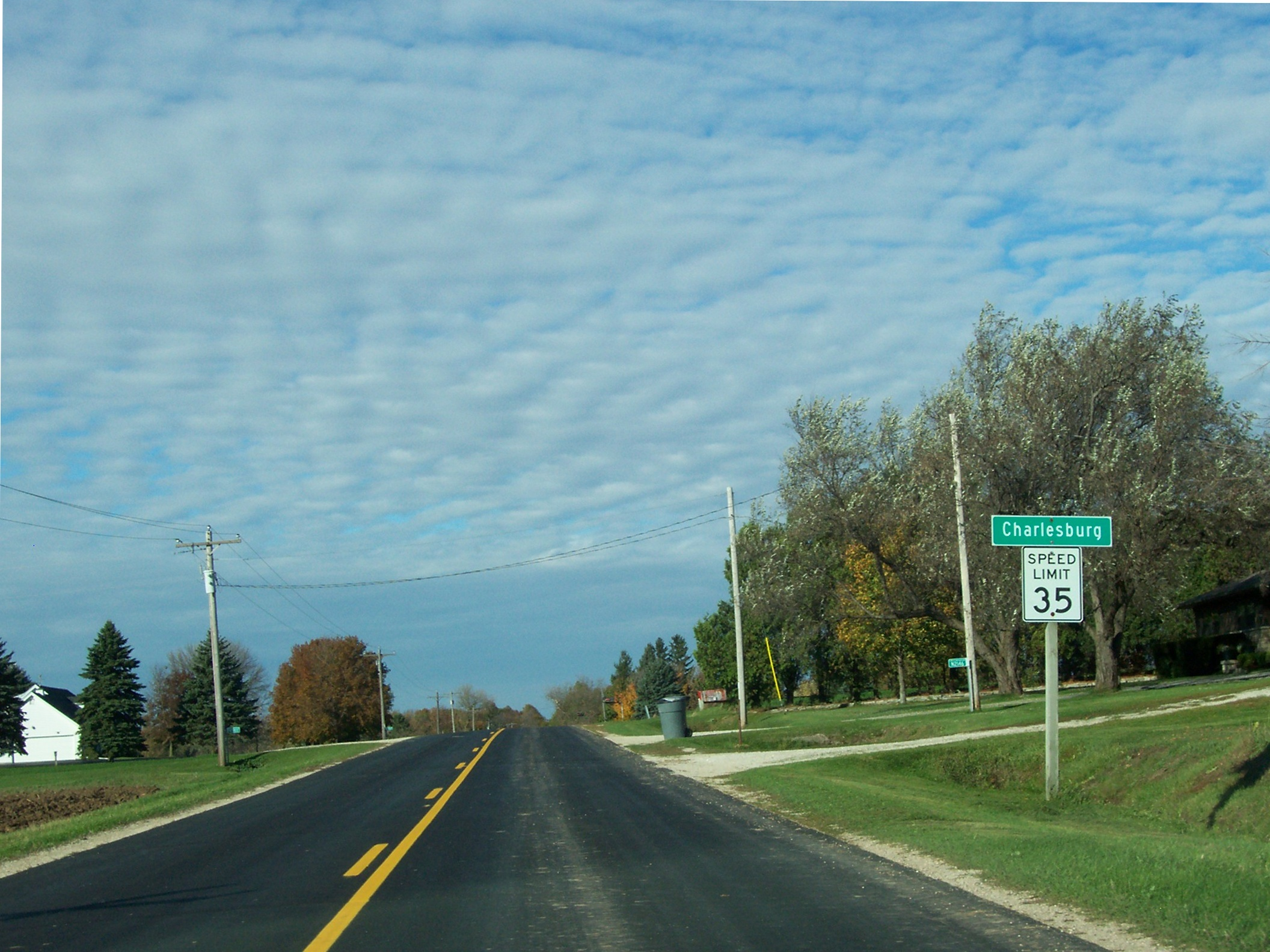
Looking north at the entrance sign to Charlesburg

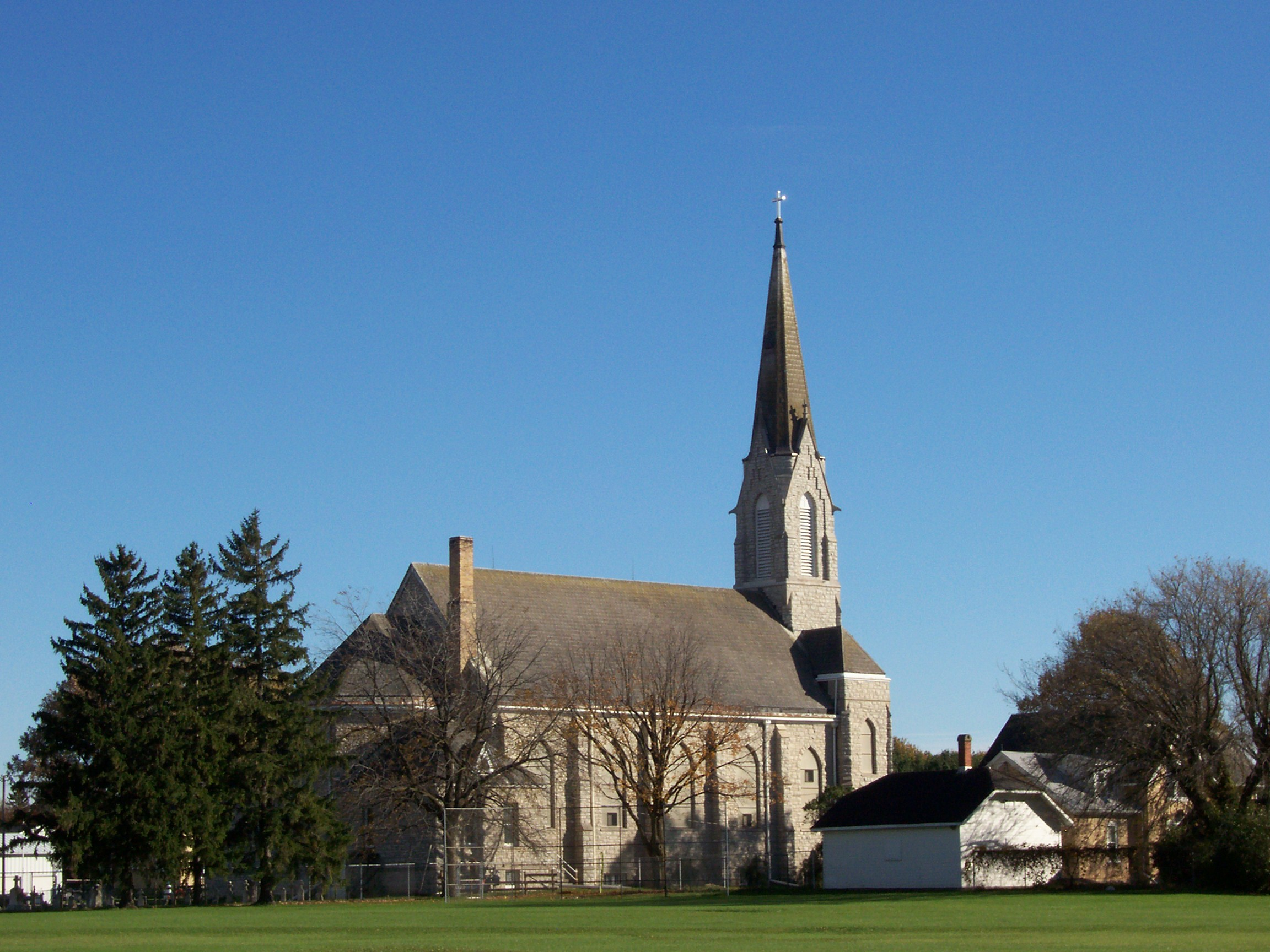
St. Charles Church
