= Harrison (ghost town), Calumet County, Wisconsin =

Harrison, Wisconsin
- Ghost town
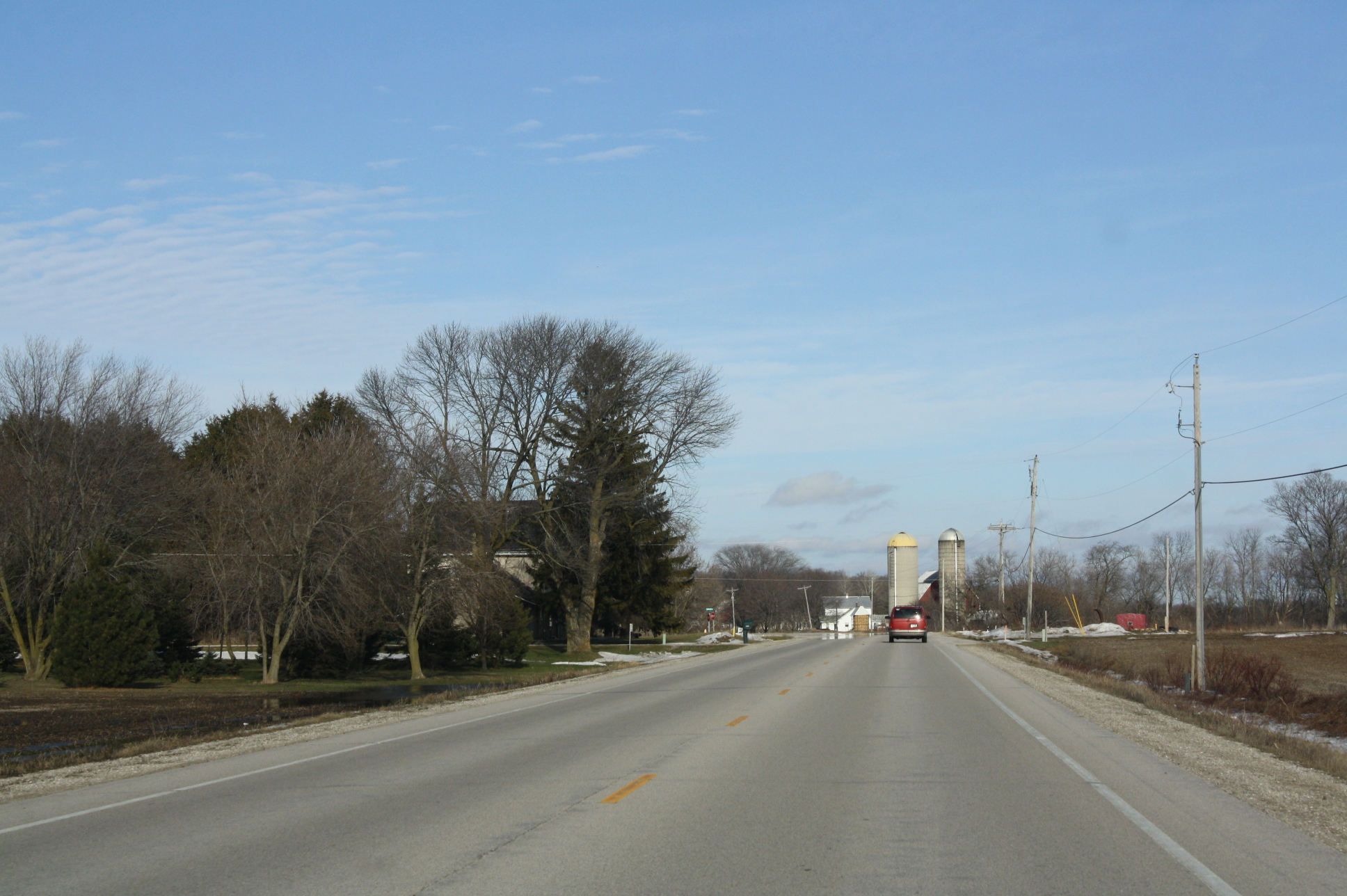
- Looking north at the intersection with Harrison Road from WIS 55

- Location within Wisconsin
- Coordinates: 44°08′03″N 88°17′30″W
- Country: United States
- State: Wisconsin
- County: Calumet
- Town: Harrison
- Established: 1870s
- Elevation: 988 ft (301 m)
- Time zone: UTC-6 (Central (CST))
  - Summer (DST): UTC-5 (CDT)
- Area code: 920
- GNIS feature ID: 1577629

Harrison is a former community in the town of Harrison, Calumet County, Wisconsin, United States.

== History ==
Harrison was settled in the 1870s around a Catholic church and school between Stockbridge and Sherwood. The church's first priest was Rev. John Adt. The original community has been a ghost town since before the 1970s and the only remnant of that community is the church's cemetery.
