= Chilton Times-Journal =

American newspaper (1857–2017)

- Type: Weekly newspaper (Thursday)
- Format: Broadsheet
- Owner(s): Calumet Press Inc.
- Publisher: James Moran
- Editor: Ben Rodgers
- Founded: 1857
- Ceased publication: 2017
- Headquarters: 19 East Main Street; Chilton, Wisconsin 53014; United States
- Circulation: 4,400 (as of 2007)
- Website: chiltontimesjournal.com

The Chilton Times-Journal was a weekly newspaper published in Chilton, Wisconsin, from 1857 to 2017. The Thursday paper was primarily distributed in Calumet County, Wisconsin. It had a circulation in 2007 of approximately 4,400. The newspaper was owned by Calumet Press, Inc.

The newspaper served Chilton, Hilbert, Stockbridge, and other parts of Calumet County.

== History ==
The Chilton Times was started in 1857. C. W. Fitch was the first editor/publisher, and John P. Hume was the printer/manager. Fitch sold the newspaper to Hume eight months later, and Hume became the editor. The newspaper was 100% Democratic. William J. McHale bought the Times in 1932, and it was combined with the Journal. Numerous people owned the newspaper between 1932 and 1979. The Times Journal added the Calumet County Shopper and Badger Sportsman to its lineup during that period. The paper was purchased by Gary Vercauteren in 1979, and he sold it to its current owner James Moran in August 2001. The last editor was Ben Rodgers.

The paper ceased in March 2017.
