= Aloysius Leitner =

American Marine corp

- Born: 1893; Charlesburg, Wisconsin, U.S.
- Died: June 12, 1918 (aged 24–25)
- Military career
- Allegiance: United States
- Branch: United States Navy
- Unit: United States Marine Corps
- Conflicts: First World War

Aloysius Leitner (1893 – June 12, 1918) served in the United States Marine Corps during World War I. He was posthumously awarded the Navy Cross and Distinguished Service Cross.

His Navy Cross citation reads:

The President of the United States of America takes pride in presenting the Navy Cross (Posthumously) to Private Aloysius Leitner (MCSN: 725545), United States Marine Corps, for extraordinary heroism while serving with the Headquarters Company, 5th Regiment (Marines), 2d Division, A.E.F. in action 12 June 1918, in the attack on Bois-de-Belleau, France. Although seriously wounded, Private Leitner displayed extraordinary heroism in assisting to capture three officers and one hundred sixty-nine men of the enemy forces, after which he continued forward and aided in taking six more prisoners, who were operating a machine gun. The wounds received while performing these valiant deeds proved fatal.

His Distinguished Service Cross citation reads:

The President of the United States of America, authorized by Act of Congress, July 9, 1918, takes pride in presenting the Distinguished Service Cross (Posthumously) to Private Aloysius Leitner (MCSN: 725545), United States Marine Corps, for extraordinary heroism while serving with the Headquarters Company, Fifth Regiment (Marines), 2d Division, A.E.F., in action 12 June 1918, in the attack on Bois-de-Belleau, France. Although seriously wounded, Private Leitner displayed extraordinary heroism in assisting to capture three officers and one hundred sixty-nine men of the enemy forces, after which he continued forward and aided in taking six more prisoners, who were operating a machine gun. The wounds received while performing these valiant deeds proved fatal.

Leitner was born in Charlesburg, Wisconsin. His home of record was New Holstein, Wisconsin.
