= Jericho, Calumet County, Wisconsin =

- Unincorporated community
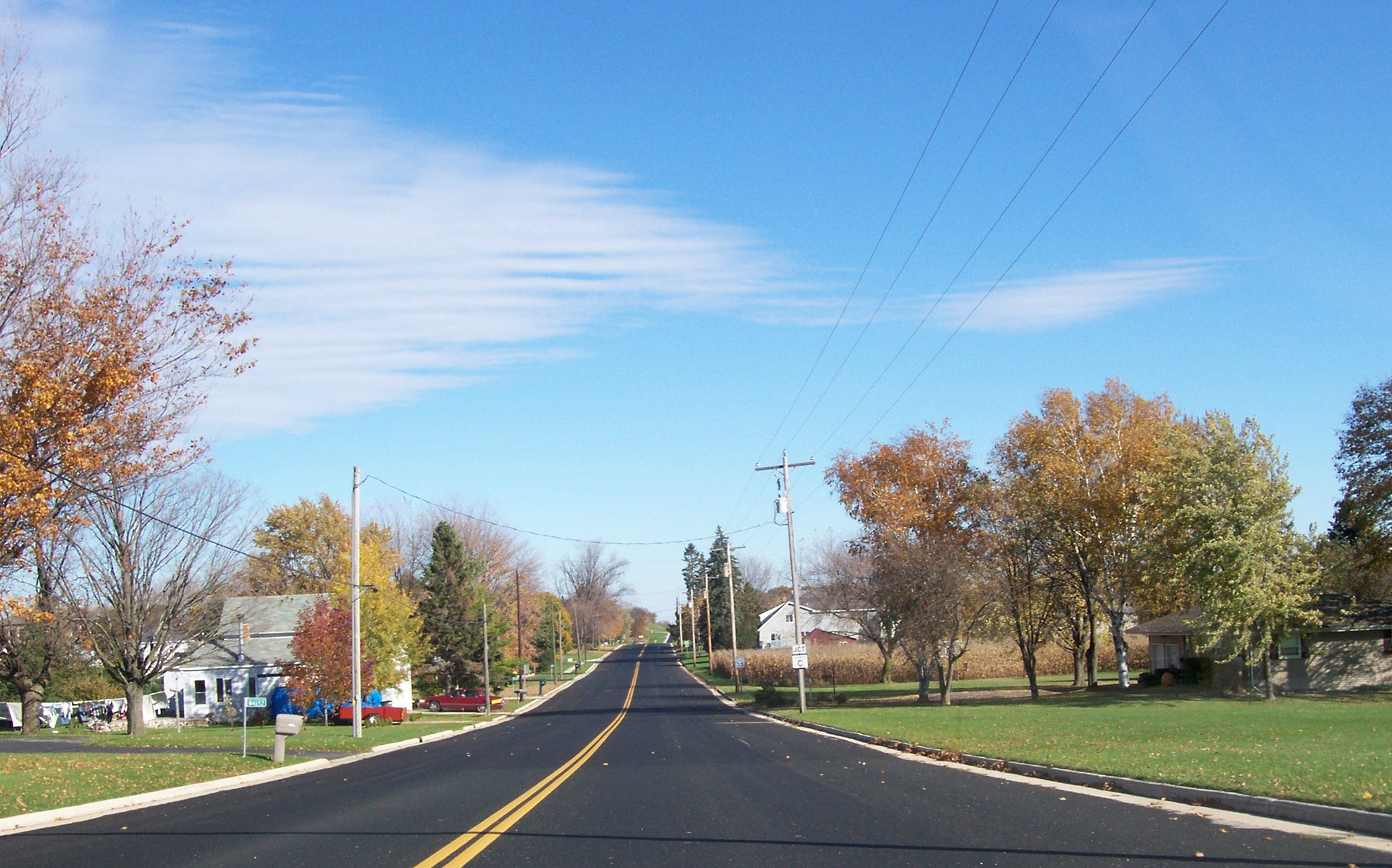
- Looking west at Jericho

- Location in Wisconsin Jericho (the United States)
- Coordinates: 43°58′12″N 88°15′59″W
- Country: United States
- State: Wisconsin
- County: Calumet
- Town: Brothertown
- established: 1855
- Time zone: UTC-6 (Central (CST))
  - Summer (DST): UTC-5 (CDT)
- Area code: 920

Jericho is an unincorporated community in the town of Brothertown in Calumet County, Wisconsin, United States. Jericho is located at the intersection of County highways C & H. Jericho is part of the Holyland region in Wisconsin.

== History ==
Jericho was settled in 1855 as a station on the plank road between Brothertown and Sheboygan. One of its first settlers was J. M. Parkins who constructed Sechter's Inn as one of the community's first buildings.

== Images ==
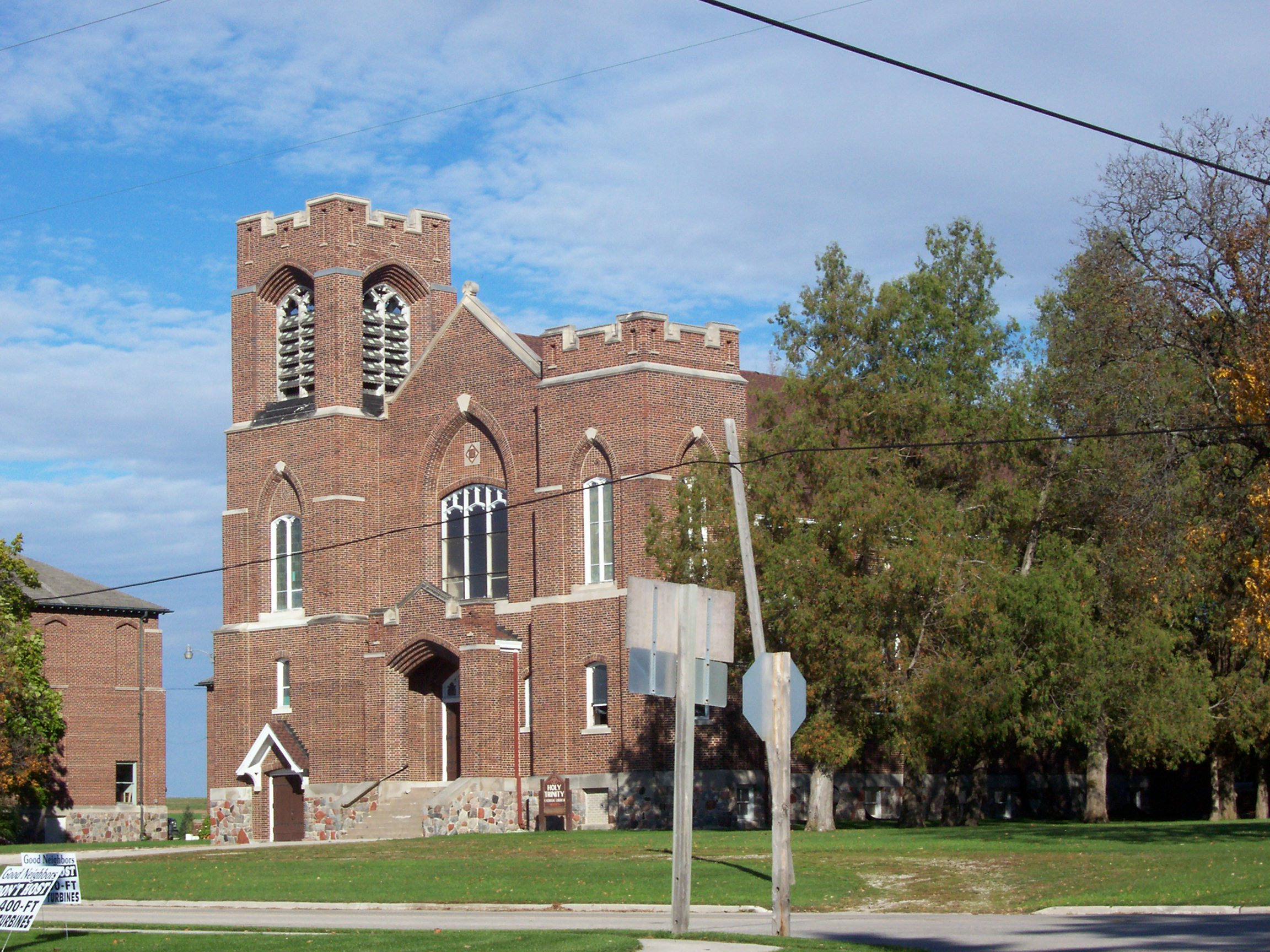
Holy Trinity church

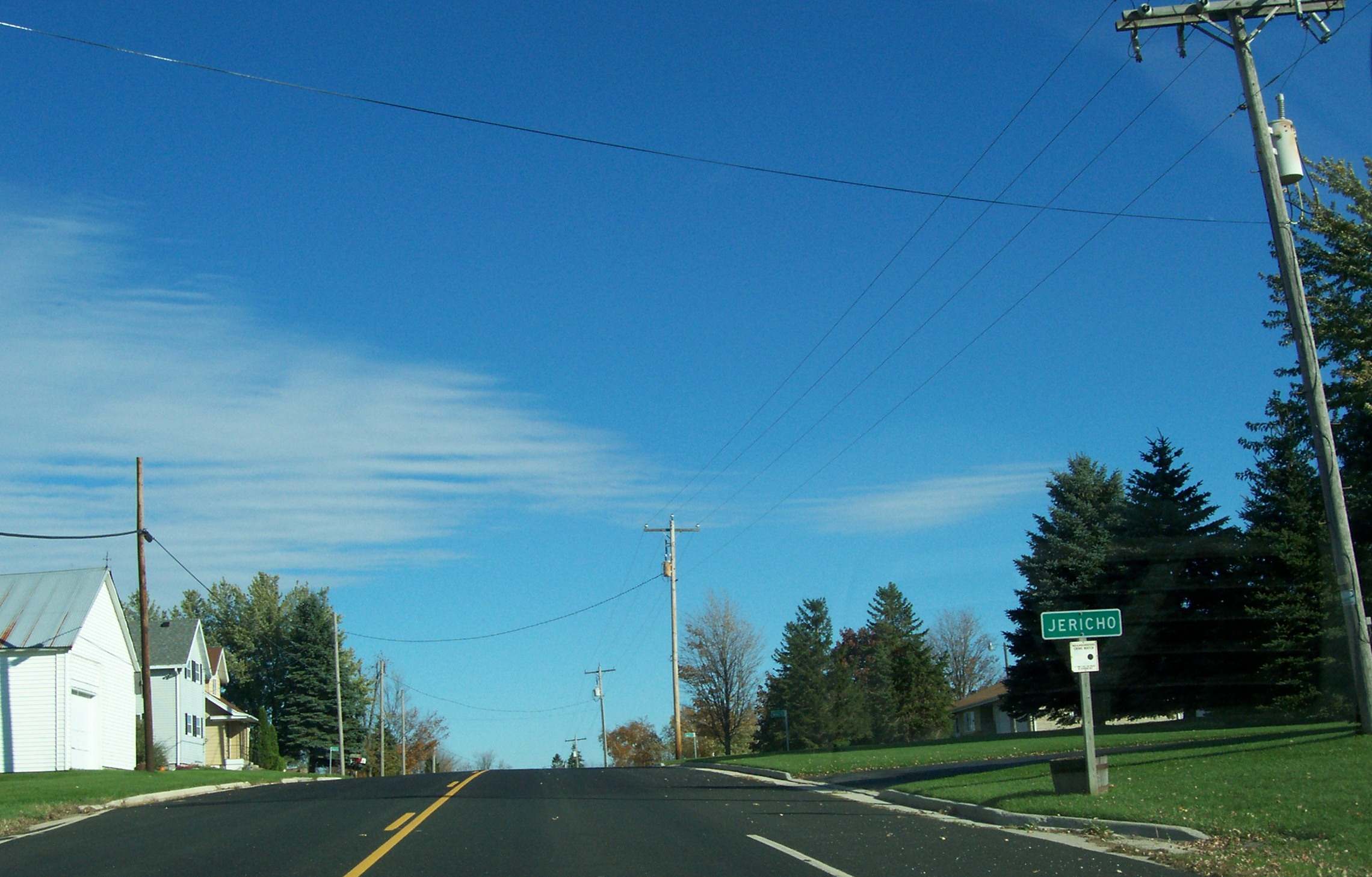
Looking west at Jericho's entrance sign
