= Calumet County, Wisconsin =

County in Wisconsin, United States

- County
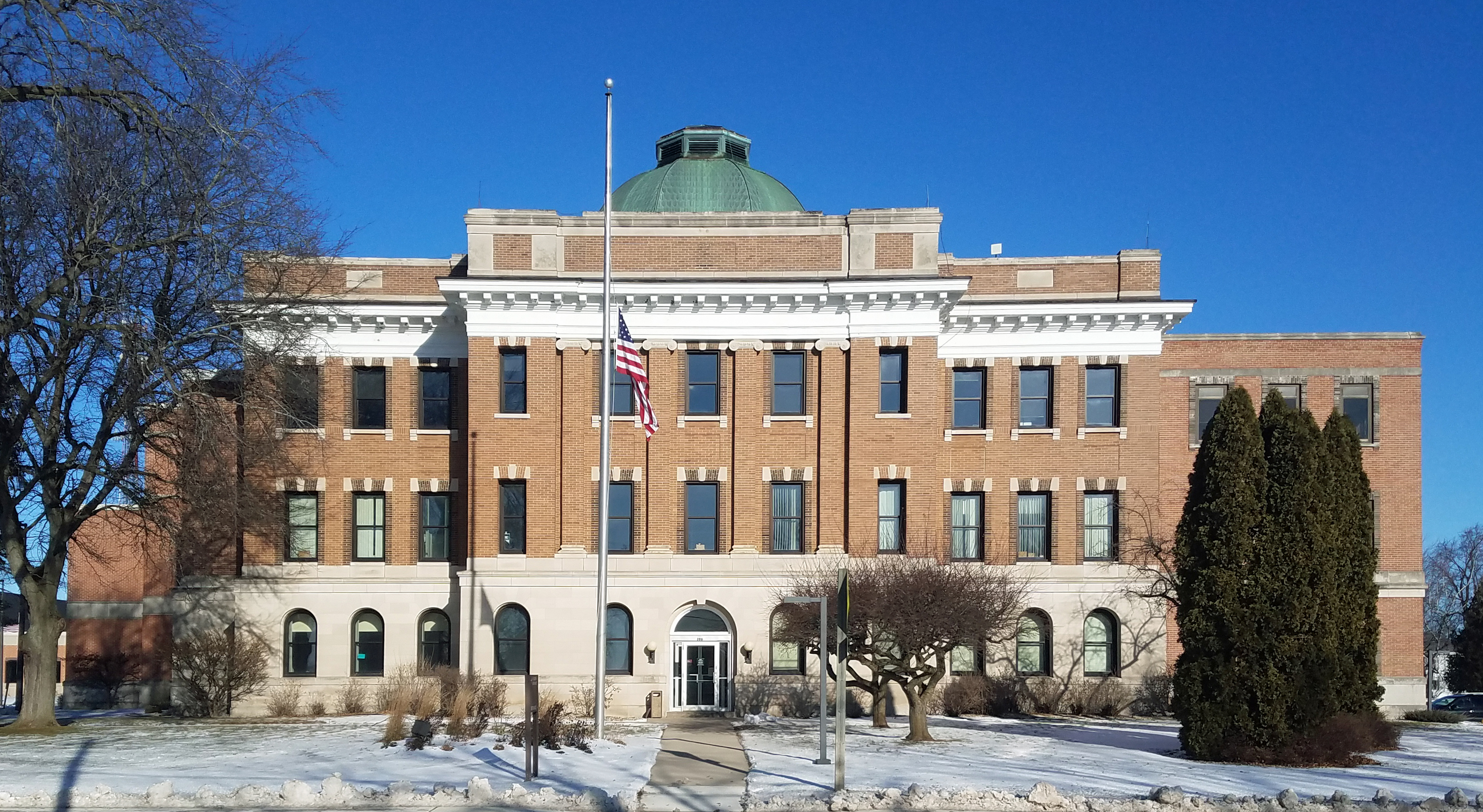
- Calumet County Courthouse

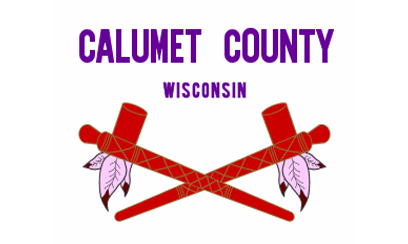
- Flag

- Location within the U.S. state of Wisconsin
- Coordinates: 44°05′N 88°13′W
- Country: United States
- State: Wisconsin
- Founded: 1850
- Seat: Chilton
- Largest city: Chilton

Area
  - Total: 397 sq mi (1,030 km^{2})
  - Land: 318 sq mi (820 km^{2})
  - Water: 79 sq mi (200 km^{2}) 20%

Population (2020)
  - Total: 52,442
  - Estimate (2025): 53,982 ▲
  - Density: 165/sq mi (63.7/km^{2})
- Time zone: UTC−6 (Central)
  - Summer (DST): UTC−5 (CDT)
- Congressional district: 8th
- Website: www.co.calumet.wi.us

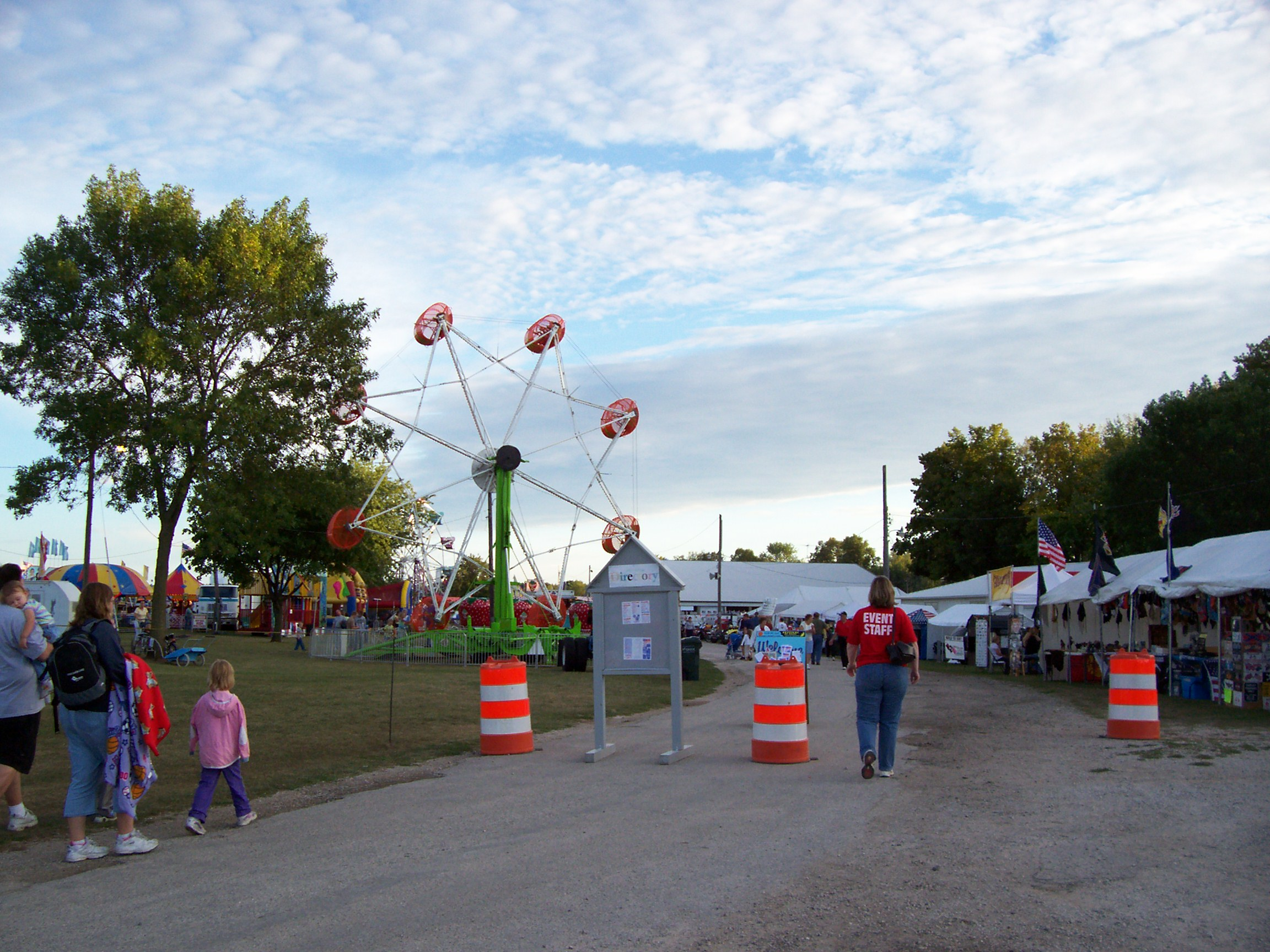
2006 Calumet County Fair

Calumet County is a county located in the U.S. state of Wisconsin. As of the 2020 census, the population was 52,442. The county seat is Chilton. The county was created in 1836 (then in the Wisconsin Territory) and organized in 1850.

Calumet County is included in the Appleton, WI Metropolitan Statistical Area as well as the Appleton-Oshkosh-Neenah, WI Combined Statistical Area.

The Holyland is partially located in southern Calumet County.

== History ==
The county's name originated from the word calumet, the French name for the ceremonial pipes used by Native Americans in councils on the east shore of Lake Winnebago.

In the 1830s, the United States government relocated Native Americans from New York and New England to the southwest part of the county; these included the Brothertown Indians, Oneida Indians, and Stockbridge-Munsee Indians. This was a second migration for the Brothertown and Stockbridge Indians, who had moved to New York after the American Revolutionary War. The Oneida shared land on their reservation with these peoples, who had been displaced by the years of colonization in New England, warfare and disease.

Many of the early European residents in the Holyland region in the southern part of the county were emigrants from the Schleswig-Holstein region in Germany in the 1840s.

The county was legally organized on February 5, 1850, by Chapter 84 Laws of 1850.

Calumet County figures prominently in the 2015 Netflix television series Making a Murderer, which documents the arrests and trials of Manitowoc County resident Steven Avery, which involves from 2005 the Calumet sheriff's department and district attorney's office of Ken Kratz.

== Geography ==
According to the U.S. Census Bureau, the county has a total area of 397 square miles (1,030 km^{2}), of which 318 square miles (820 km^{2}) is land and 79 square miles (200 km^{2}) (20%) is water. It is the fifth-smallest county in Wisconsin by land area and fourth-smallest by total area. The west boundary is largely in Lake Winnebago. The Niagara Escarpment runs north–south several miles east of the western boundary. The topography has been greatly influenced by glaciation.

=== Adjacent counties ===
- Brown County – northeast
- Manitowoc County – east
- Sheboygan County – southeast
- Fond du Lac County – southwest
- Winnebago County – west
- Outagamie County – northwest

== Climate ==
Calumet County

Climate chart (precipitation, max. and min. temperature)
J	F	M	A	M	J	J	A	S	O	N	D
70 −8 −13	76 −6 −12	82 1 −6	132 16 1	116 21 7	127 26 14	104 27 17	104 25 16	83 22 11	125 13 4	76 5 −2	65 −8 −12
- █ Average max. and min. temperatures in °C
- █ Precipitation totals in mm
Imperial conversion
J	F	M	A	M	J	J	A	S	O	N	D
2.8 18 9	3 21 10	3.2 34 21	5.2 61 34	4.6 70 45	5 79 57	4.1 81 63	4.1 77 61	3.3 72 52	4.9 55 39	3 41 28	2.6 18 10
- █ Average max. and min. temperatures in °F
- █ Precipitation totals in inches

== Demographics ==
Historical population
Census	Pop.	Note	%±
1840	275		—
1850	1,743		533.8%
1860	1,895		8.7%
1870	12,335		550.9%
1880	16,632		34.8%
1890	16,639		0.0%
1900	17,078		2.6%
1910	16,701		−2.2%
1920	17,228		3.2%
1930	16,848		−2.2%
1940	17,618		4.6%
1950	18,840		6.9%
1960	22,268		18.2%
1970	27,604		24.0%
1980	30,867		11.8%
1990	34,291		11.1%
2000	40,631		18.5%
2010	48,971		20.5%
2020	52,442		7.1%
2025 (est.)	53,982	▲	2.9%
U.S. Decennial Census; 1790–1960 1900–1990; 1990–2000 2010–2020

=== Racial and ethnic composition ===
Calumet County, Wisconsin – Racial and ethnic composition Note: the US Census treats Hispanic/Latino as an ethnic category. This table excludes Latinos from the racial categories and assigns them to a separate category. Hispanics/Latinos may be of any race.
Race / Ethnicity (NH = Non-Hispanic)	Pop 1980	Pop 1990	Pop 2000	Pop 2010	Pop 2020	% 1980	% 1990	% 2000	% 2010	% 2020
White alone (NH)	30,557	33,798	39,062	45,325	46,056	99.00%	98.56%	96.14%	92.55%	87.82%
Black or African American alone (NH)	9	29	109	236	419	0.03%	0.08%	0.27%	0.48%	0.80%
Native American or Alaska Native alone (NH)	104	144	128	179	189	0.34%	0.42%	0.32%	0.37%	0.36%
Asian alone (NH)	80	170	627	1,027	1,269	0.26%	0.50%	1.54%	2.10%	2.42%
Native Hawaiian or Pacific Islander alone (NH)	x	x	2	14	42	x	x	0.00%	0.03%	0.08%
Other race alone (NH)	12	1	18	24	124	0.04%	0.00%	0.04%	0.05%	0.24%
Mixed race or Multiracial (NH)	x	x	250	476	1,486	x	x	0.62%	0.97%	2.83%
Hispanic or Latino (any race)	105	149	435	1,690	2,857	0.34%	0.43%	1.07%	3.45%	5.45%
Total	30,867	34,291	40,631	48,971	52,442	100.00%	100.00%	100.00%	100.00%	100.00%

=== 2020 census ===
As of the census of 2020, the population was 52,442. The population density was 164.8 people per square mile (63.6 people/km^{2}). There were 21,511 housing units at an average density of 67.6 units per square mile (26.1 units/km^{2}). The racial makeup of the county was 88.7% White, 2.4% Asian, 0.8% Black or African American, 0.5% Native American, 0.1% Pacific Islander, 2.9% from other races, and 4.6% from two or more races. Ethnically, the population was 5.4% Hispanic or Latino of any race.

=== 2000 census ===
2000 Census Age Pyramid for Calumet County

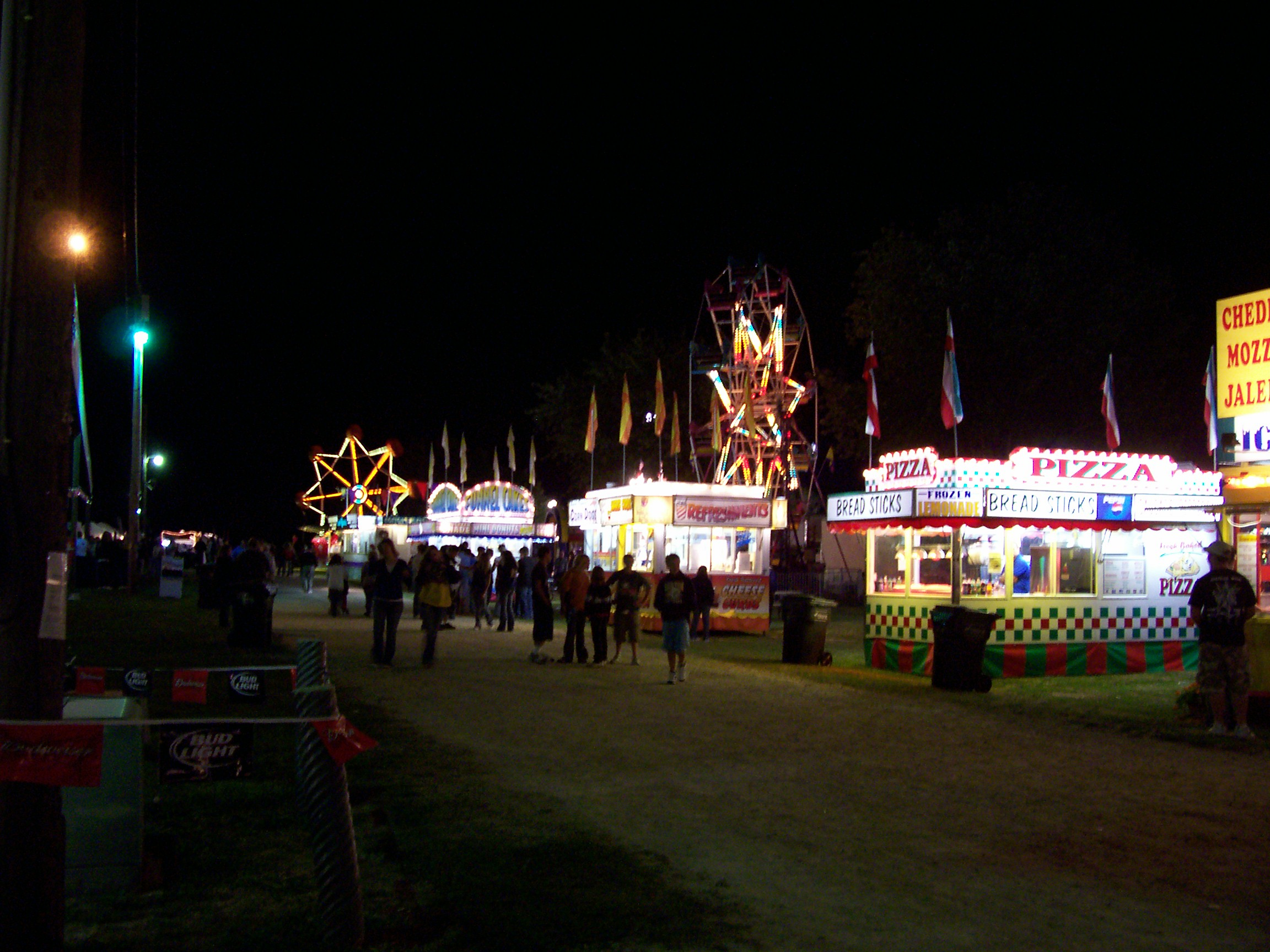
2006 Calumet County Fair at night

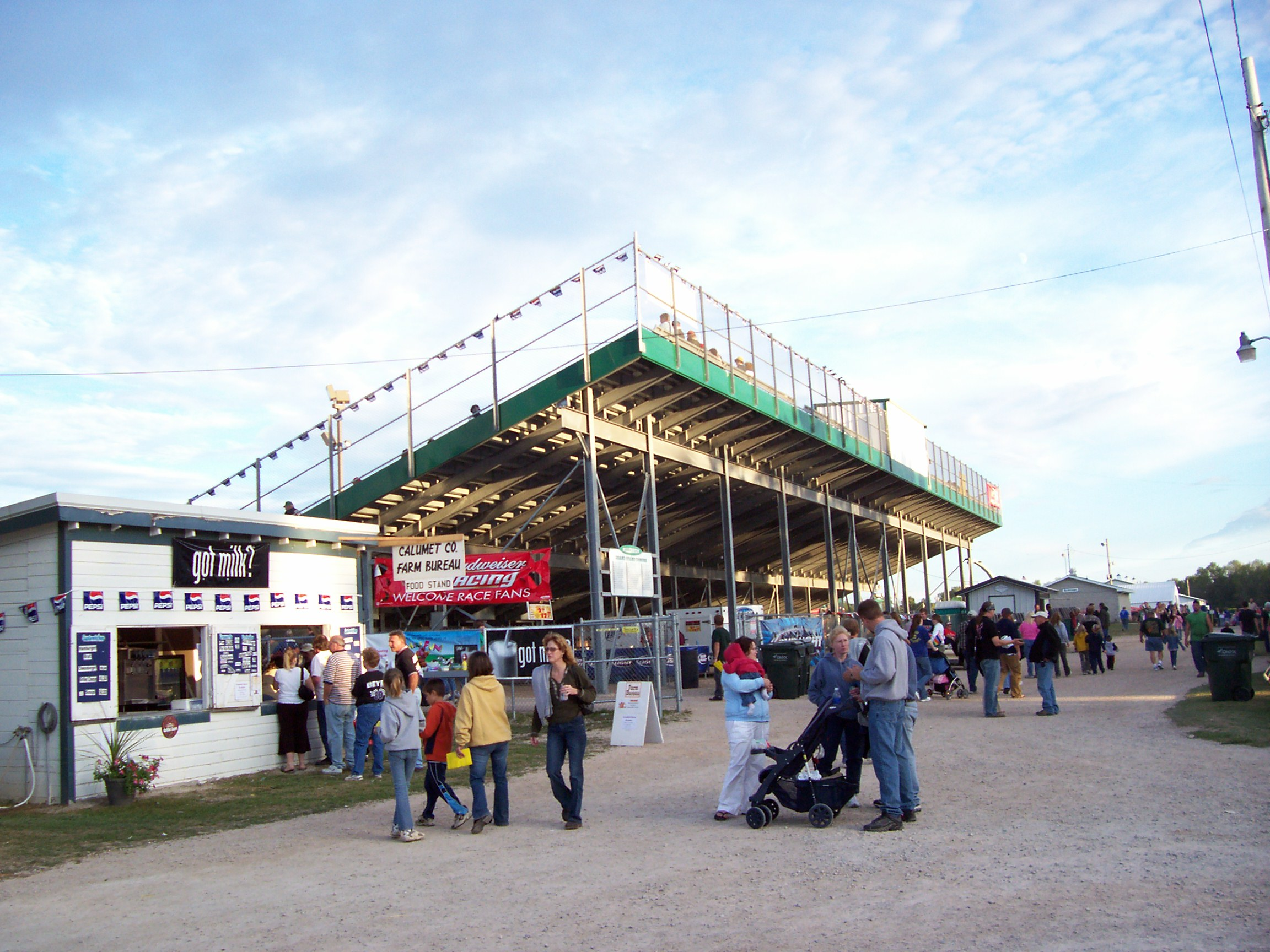
Grandstands during the 2006 Calumet County Fair

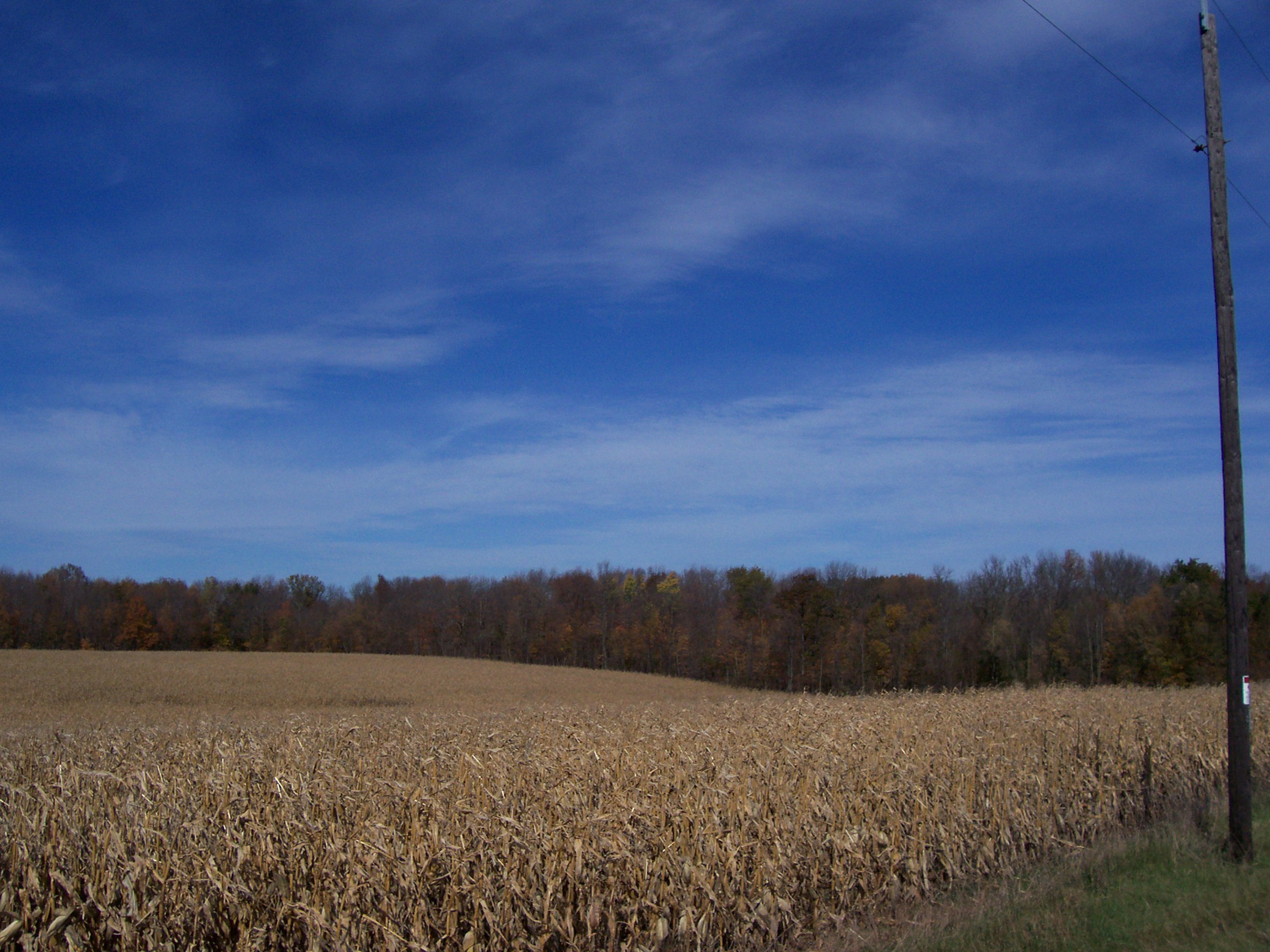
Typical mix of rolling fields and woods in fall

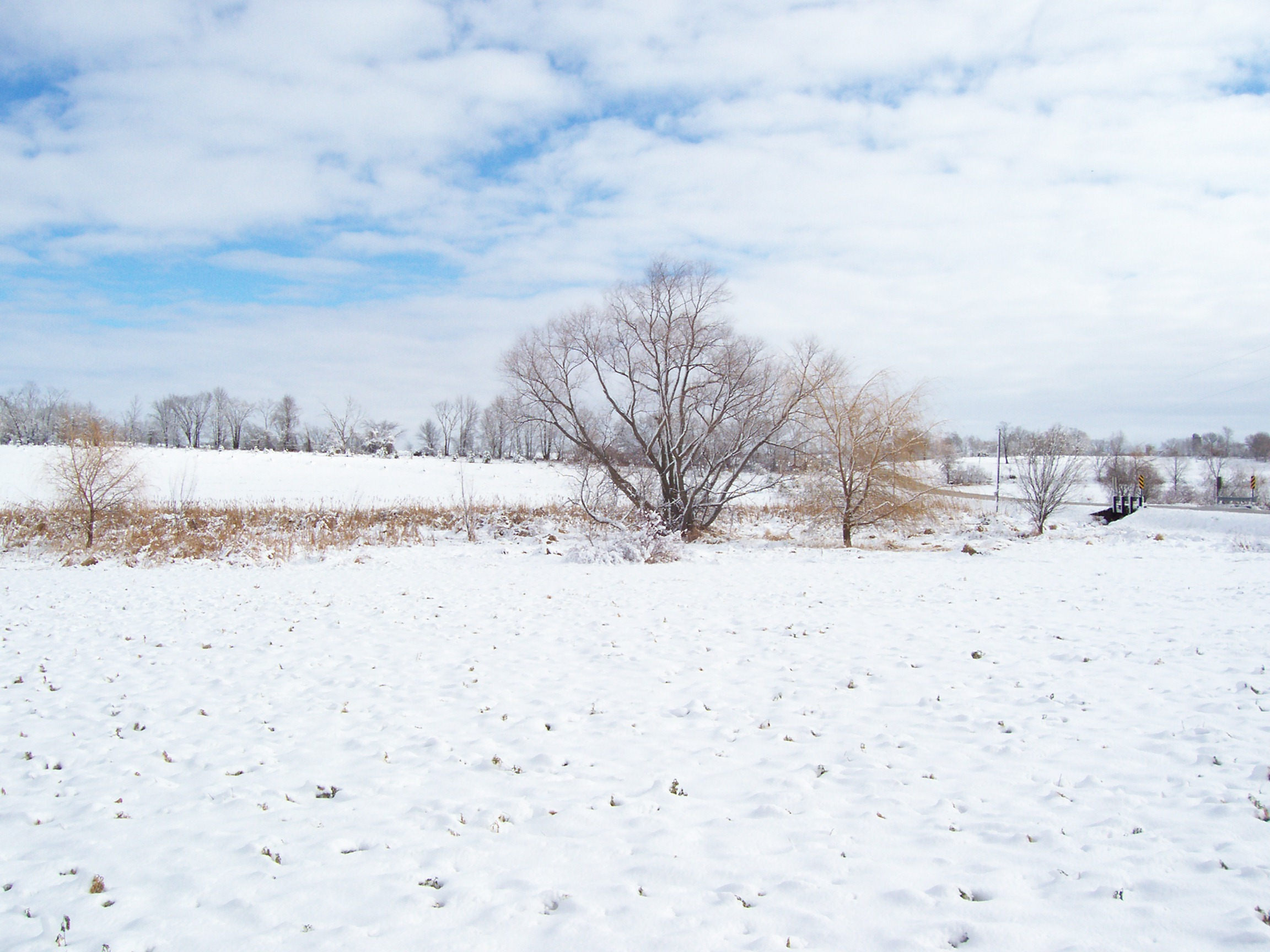
Calumet County in winter

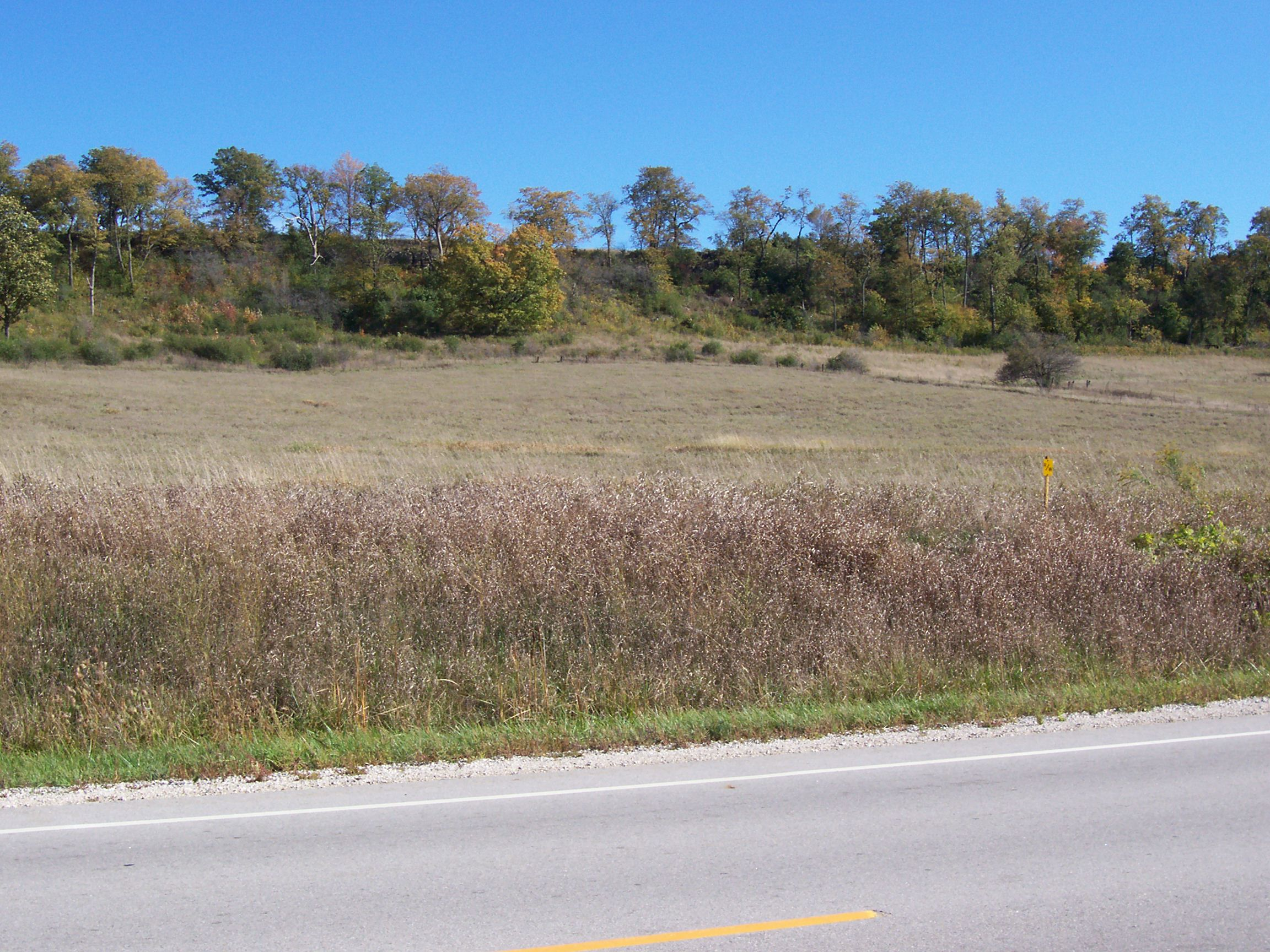
Niagara Escarpment

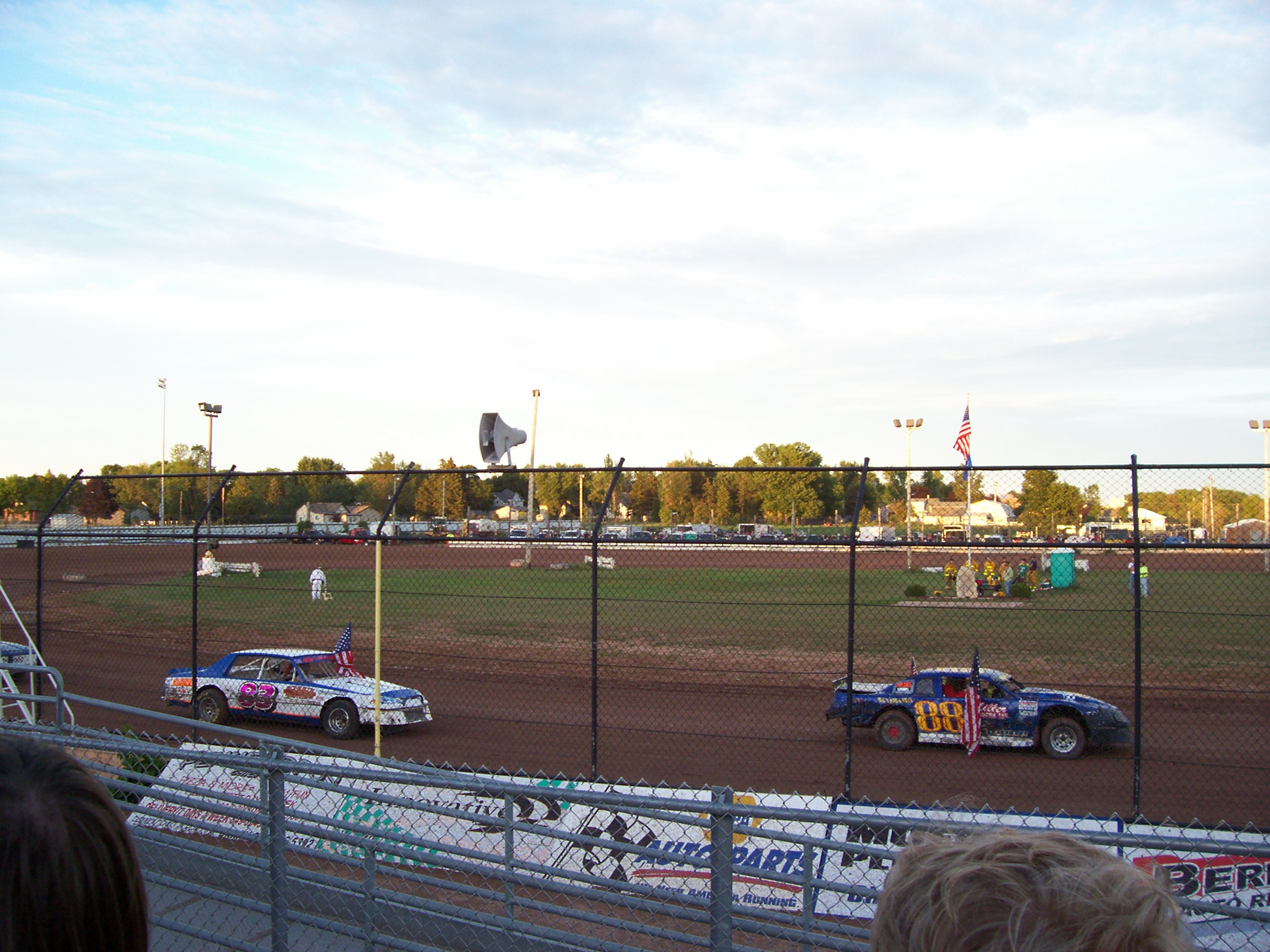
Stock cars at the county fairgrounds

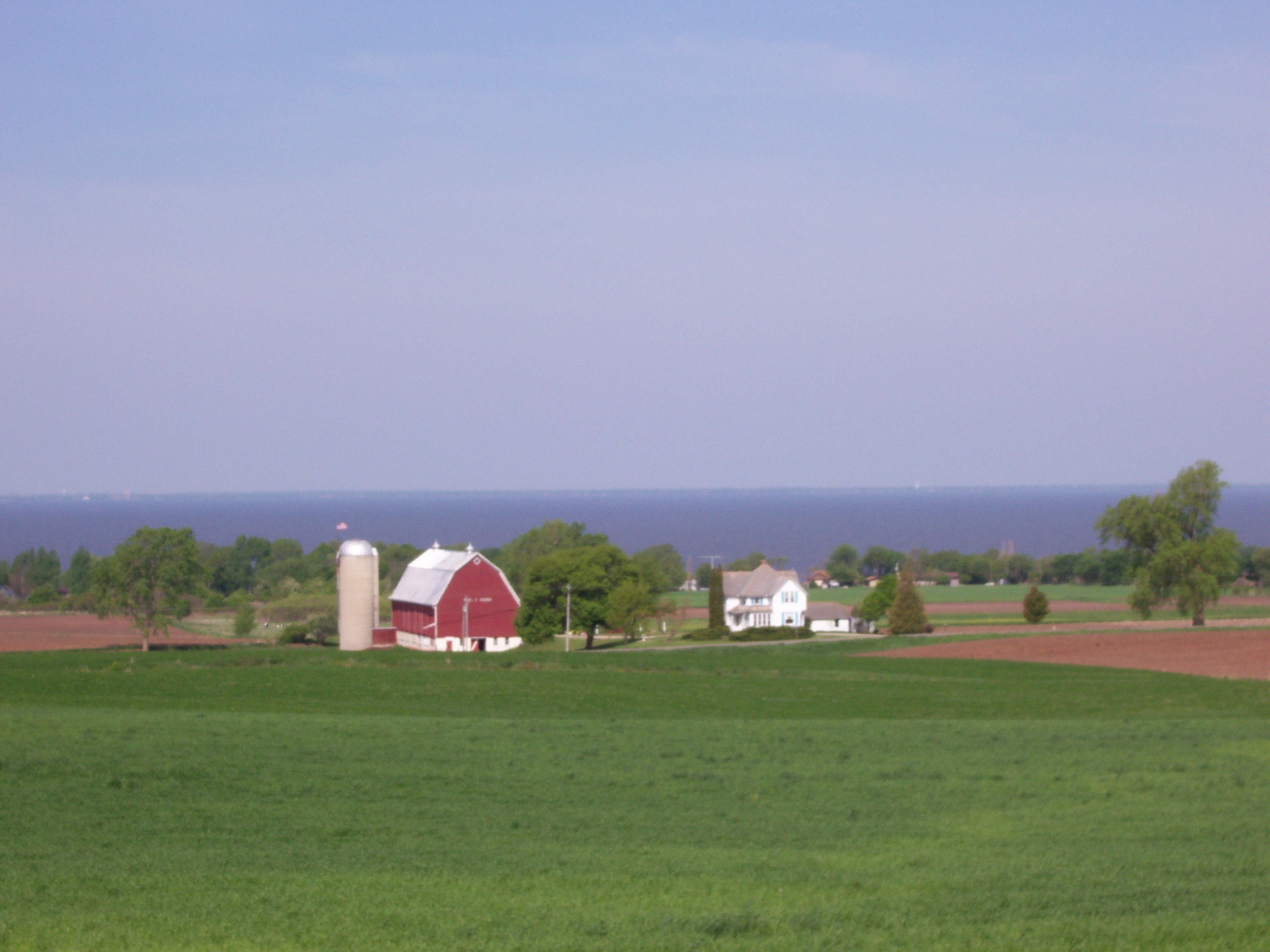
Farmland overlooking Lake Winnebago

As of the census of 2000, there were 40,631 people, 14,910 households, and 11,167 families residing in the county. The population density was 127 people per square mile (49 people/km^{2}). There were 15,758 housing units at an average density of 49 units per square mile (19 units/km^{2}). The racial makeup of the county was 96.68% White, 0.31% Black or African American, 0.34% Native American, 1.55% Asian, 0.01% Pacific Islander, 0.38% from other races, and 0.74% from two or more races. 1.07% of the population were Hispanic or Latino of any race. 63.4% were of German ancestry. 96.0% spoke English, 1.7% Spanish and 1.2% German as their first language.

There were 14,910 households, out of which 38.50% had children under the age of 18 living with them, 65.00% were married couples living together, 6.50% had a female householder with no husband present, and 25.10% were non-families. 20.40% of all households were made up of individuals, and 7.50% had someone living alone who was 65 years of age or older. The average household size was 2.70 and the average family size was 3.15.

In the county, the population was spread out, with 28.60% under the age of 18, 7.20% from 18 to 24, 32.00% from 25 to 44, 21.40% from 45 to 64, and 10.80% who were 65 years of age or older. The median age was 35 years. For every 100 females there were 100.00 males. For every 100 females age 18 and over, there were 99.00 males.

In 2017, there were 478 births, giving a general fertility rate of 52.0 births per 1000 women aged 15–44, the ninth lowest rate out of all 72 Wisconsin counties. Additionally, there were 14 reported induced abortions performed on women of Calumet County residence in 2017.

== Economy ==
The University of Wisconsin–Extension has compiled statistics on Calumet County's dairy industry. Calumet County has more bovines (cattle and calves) than people. As of 2010 there are 28,600 head of dairy cows and 65,000 head of bovine total (that includes dairy cows, beef cattle, and calves.) 73% of land in the county is owned by farmers. 2400 residents are employed in farming. Agriculture results in $338 million in economic activity, and it contributes $68.2 million in income to the county total income (including $7.2 million towards taxes). As of 2007, 99.3% of farms are owned by individuals, families, family partnerships or family corporations. Only 0.7% are owned by non-family corporate entities. As of April 1, 2010, Calumet county had 174 farms with dairy herd licenses.

In 1931, the Wisconsin Department of Agriculture described Calumet County as "one of the most important producers of American cheese among the counties of Wisconsin."

== Transportation ==
=== Major highways ===
- U.S. Highway 10
- U.S. Highway 151
- Highway 32 (Wisconsin)
- Highway 55 (Wisconsin)
- Highway 57 (Wisconsin)
- Highway 114 (Wisconsin)
- Highway 441 (Wisconsin)

No interstate highways run through Calumet County. There are several U.S. routes in the county. U.S. Route 10 runs east–west across the north edge of the county. U.S. Route 151 runs north–south near the west edge of the county, and turns east–west at the middle of the county. North-south state highways include 55 along the west edge, and 32/57 through the center. East-west state highways include 114 at the northwest corner of the county, and the now defunct 149 along the southeast corner. The Tri-County Expressway (WI 441) runs in an east–west to north–south curve in the extreme northwest corner of the county within Appleton city limits.

=== Railroads ===
- Wisconsin and Southern Railroad
- Canadian National

=== Buses ===
- Valley Transit (Wisconsin)

=== Airport ===
New Holstein Municipal Airport (8D1) serves the county and surrounding communities. It is located just west of New Holstein.

=== Water ===
Nearly the entire west boundary of the county is located in Lake Winnebago. The first non-natives to enter the county most likely came in the county from the lake through the Fox River. The Manitowoc River and Sheboygan River both run through the county and flow into Lake Michigan through neighboring counties.

== Recreation ==
=== County Parks ===
Calumet County has three county parks, and two county run harbors.

=== Calumet County Fairgrounds ===
Calumet County celebrated its 150th annual fair in 2006. The fairgrounds held dirt track stockcars races on Friday nights in the summer.

=== Lake Winnebago ===
The west boundary of the county is located almost entirely in Lake Winnebago. Boaters use the lake for recreational boating and fishing in the summer. The lake is the site of ice fishing in the winter, and the Wisconsin Department of Natural Resources manages a sturgeon spearing season in February.

== Communities ==
=== Cities ===
- Appleton (mostly in Outagamie County and Winnebago County)
- Brillion
- Chilton (county seat)
- Kaukauna (mostly in Outagamie County)
- Kiel (mostly in Manitowoc County)
- Menasha (mostly in Winnebago County)
- New Holstein

=== Villages ===
- Harrison (partially in Outagamie County)
- Hilbert
- Potter
- Sherwood
- Stockbridge

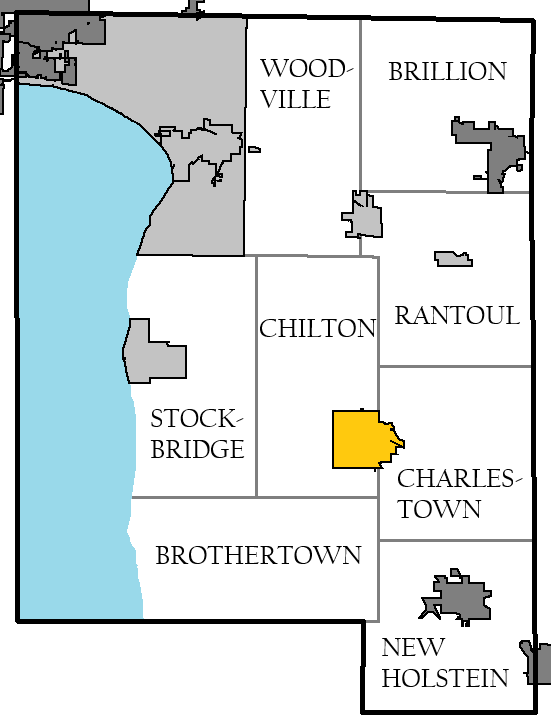
Towns of Calumet County

=== Towns ===
- Brillion
- Brothertown
- Charlestown
- Chilton
- Harrison
- New Holstein
- Rantoul
- Stockbridge
- Woodville

=== Census-designated place ===
- Forest Junction

=== Unincorporated communities ===
- Brant
- Brothertown
- Calumetville (partial)
- Charlesburg
- Dundas
- Eckers Lakeland
- Hayton
- Highland Beach
- Jericho
- Kloten
- Maple Heights
- Meggers (partial)
- Quinney
- Rockaway Beach
- Saint Catherines Bay
- St. Anna (partial)
- St. John
- Utowana Beach
- Waverly Beach (partial)
- Wells (partial)

=== Ghost town/neighborhood ===
- Harrison
- Pequot

== Politics ==
Calumet County has voted Republican in all but two elections since 1936, supporting Lyndon B. Johnson during his 1964 landslide and narrowly supporting Barack Obama in 2008.

United States presidential election results for Calumet County, Wisconsin
Year	Republican		Democratic		Third party(ies)	
Year	No.	%	No.	%	No.	%
1892	909	31.55%	1,863	64.67%	109	3.78%
1896	1,547	44.53%	1,869	53.80%	58	1.67%
1900	1,631	45.11%	1,910	52.82%	75	2.07%
1904	1,736	54.97%	1,258	39.84%	164	5.19%
1908	1,576	46.33%	1,711	50.29%	115	3.38%
1912	931	32.55%	1,366	47.76%	563	19.69%
1916	1,979	57.18%	1,382	39.93%	100	2.89%
1920	3,730	78.26%	586	12.30%	450	9.44%
1924	938	18.59%	569	11.28%	3,539	70.13%
1928	2,405	38.04%	3,871	61.22%	47	0.74%
1932	1,213	17.88%	5,485	80.84%	87	1.28%
1936	1,972	27.72%	4,694	65.99%	447	6.28%
1940	5,327	68.96%	2,324	30.08%	74	0.96%
1944	5,611	73.58%	1,966	25.78%	49	0.64%
1948	4,185	60.57%	2,662	38.53%	62	0.90%
1952	6,640	77.07%	1,970	22.87%	5	0.06%
1956	6,166	74.22%	2,099	25.26%	43	0.52%
1960	5,166	54.46%	4,312	45.46%	8	0.08%
1964	3,905	42.11%	5,356	57.75%	13	0.14%
1968	5,792	56.77%	3,609	35.37%	802	7.86%
1972	6,446	55.85%	4,804	41.62%	292	2.53%
1976	6,589	50.18%	6,241	47.53%	302	2.30%
1980	7,885	55.17%	5,036	35.23%	1,372	9.60%
1984	8,970	64.57%	4,736	34.09%	186	1.34%
1988	8,107	55.12%	6,481	44.06%	120	0.82%
1992	7,541	40.98%	5,701	30.98%	5,159	28.04%
1996	7,049	43.25%	6,940	42.58%	2,310	14.17%
2000	10,837	54.33%	8,202	41.12%	908	4.55%
2004	14,721	58.24%	10,290	40.71%	265	1.05%
2008	12,722	48.05%	13,295	50.22%	457	1.73%
2012	14,539	55.03%	11,489	43.49%	392	1.48%
2016	15,367	57.78%	9,642	36.25%	1,586	5.96%
2020	18,156	59.00%	12,116	39.37%	502	1.63%
2024	19,488	59.21%	12,927	39.27%	501	1.52%

== Notable people ==
- Ken Kratz (born 1960–61), lawyer, former district attorney of Calumet County; law license was suspended for four months after sexting scandal.

== See also ==
- National Register of Historic Places listings in Calumet County, Wisconsin
