= Brothertown (community), Wisconsin =

Brothertown, Wisconsin
- Unincorporated community
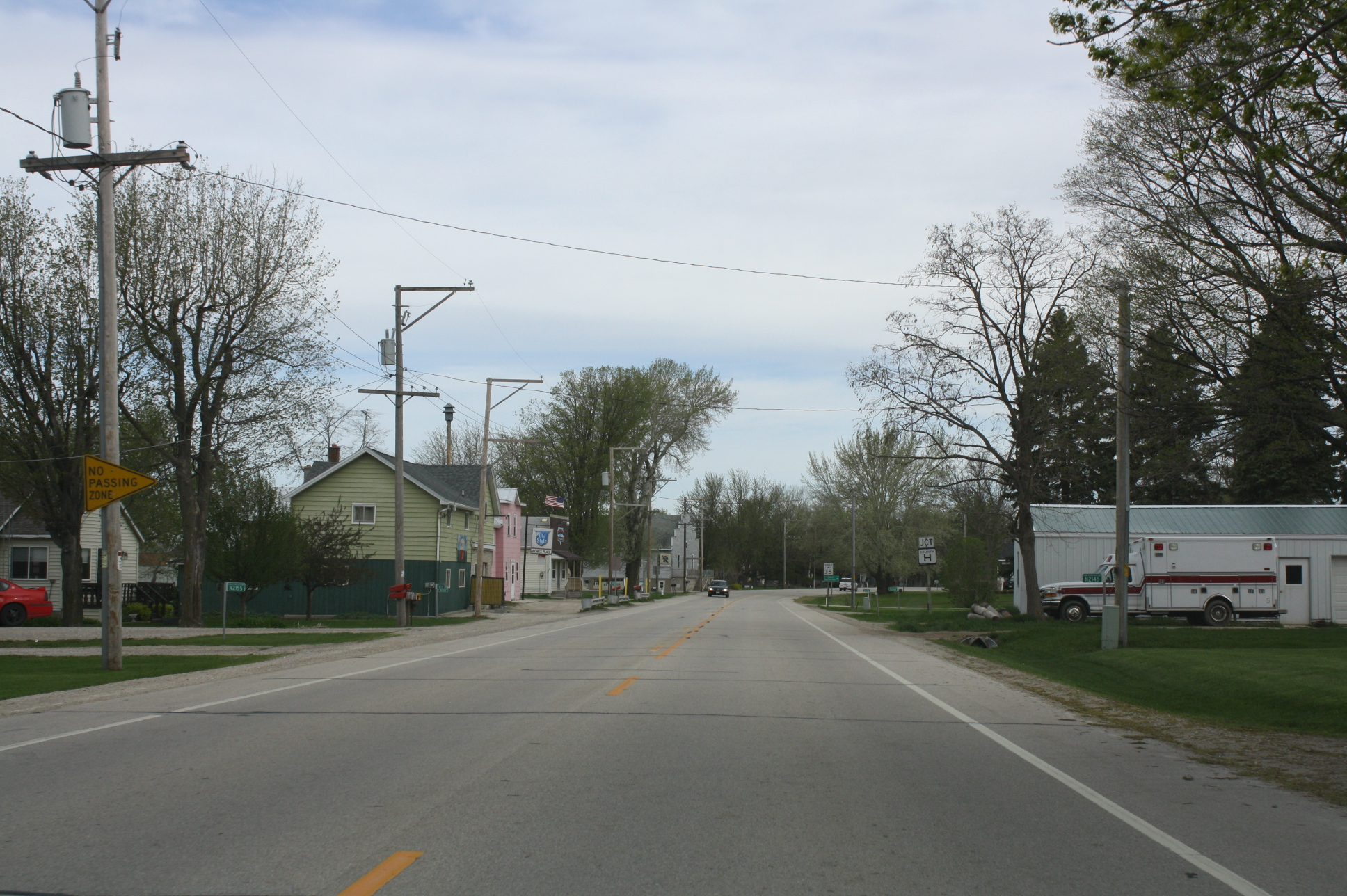
- Looking north in downtown Brothertown

- Location within Wisconsin Location within the United States
- Coordinates: 43°58′05″N 88°18′32″W
- Country: United States
- State: Wisconsin
- County: Calumet
- Town: Brothertown
- Elevation: 810 ft (250 m)
- Time zone: UTC-6 (Central (CST))
  - Summer (DST): UTC-5 (CDT)
- Area code: 920
- GNIS feature ID: 1562251

Brothertown is an unincorporated community located in the town of Brothertown, Calumet County, Wisconsin, United States.

== History ==
It was originally settled by the Brothertown Indians under the name Eeyamquittoowauconnuck. The tribe gave up its federal recognition in order to avoid relocation and much of the land was eventually settled by German immigrants.

== Images ==
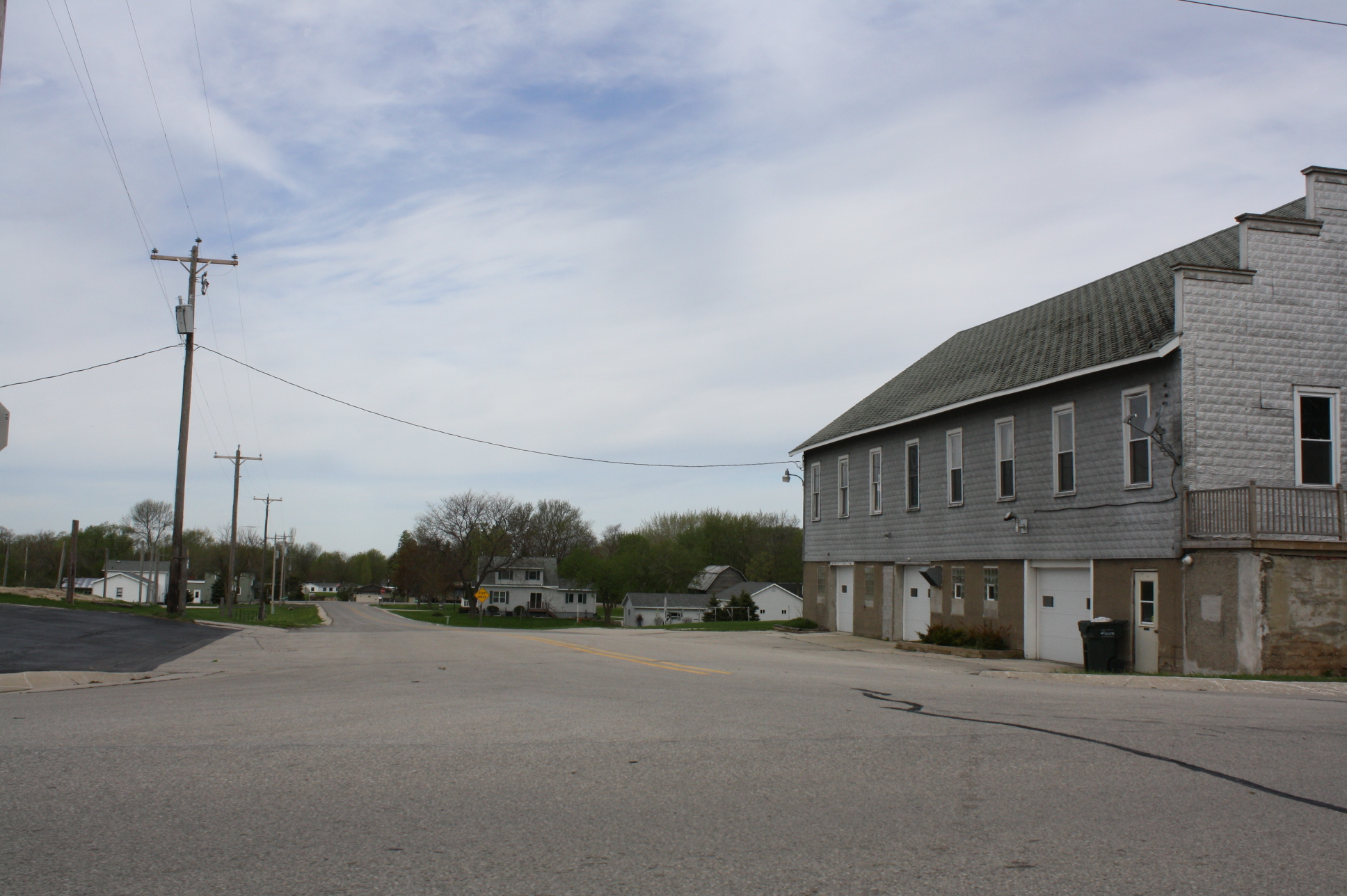
Looking west in Brothertown

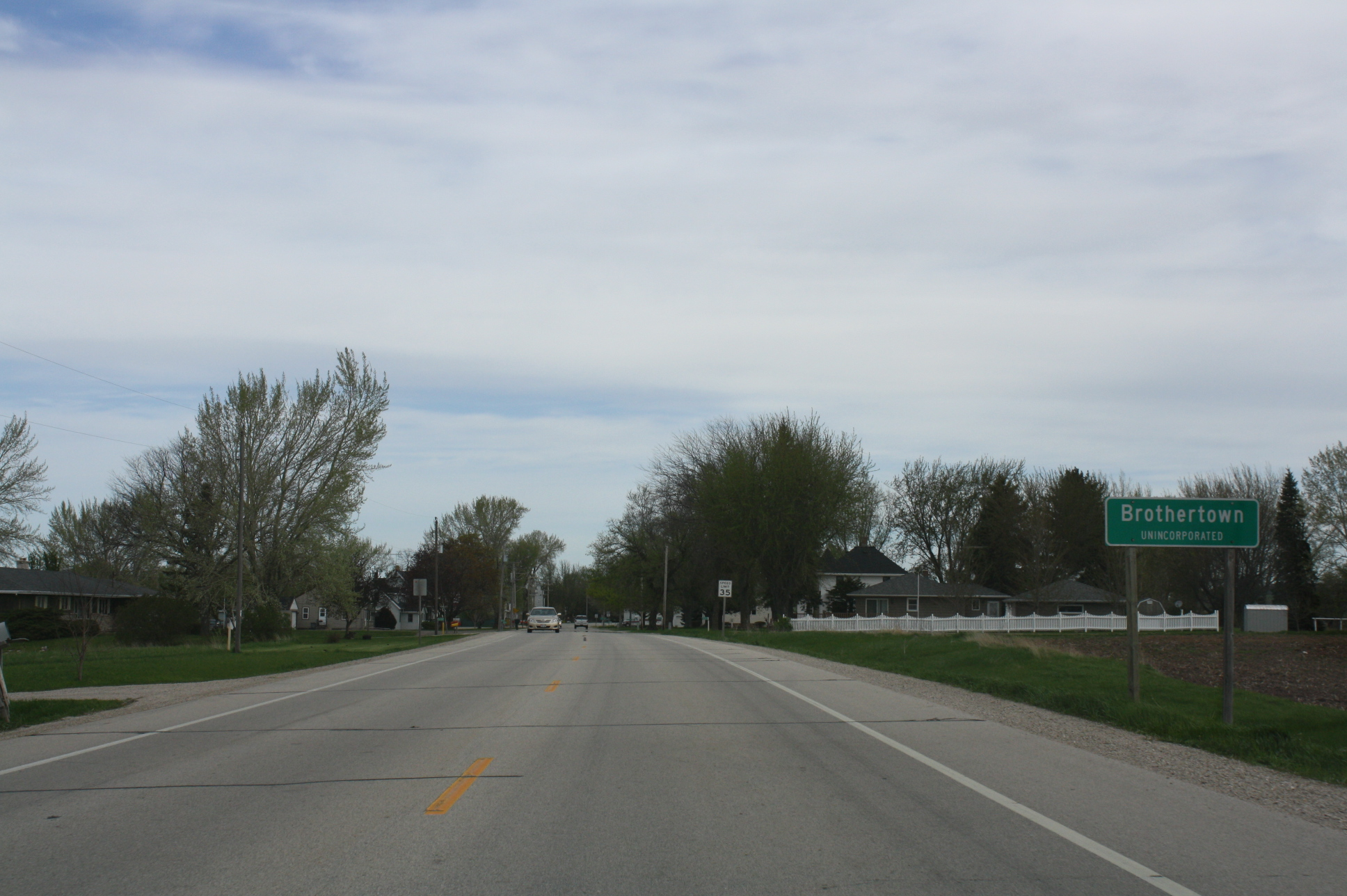
Brothertown sign on U.S. Route 151

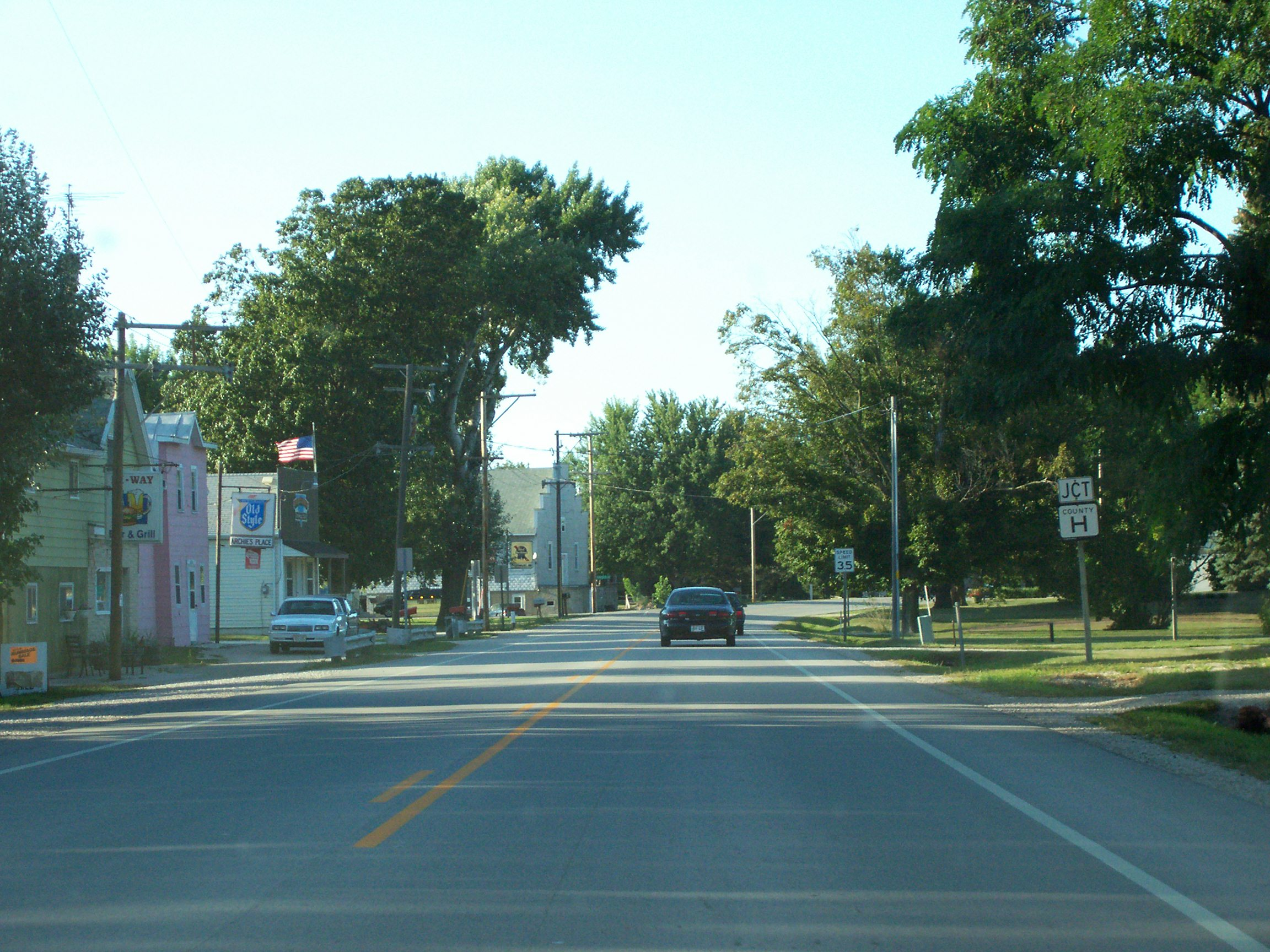
Brothertown in late summer
