= National Register of Historic Places listings in Calumet County, Wisconsin =

Location of Calumet County in Wisconsin

This is a list of the National Register of Historic Places listings in Calumet County, Wisconsin. It is intended to provide a comprehensive listing of entries in the National Register of Historic Places that are located in Calumet County, Wisconsin. The locations of National Register properties for which the latitude and longitude coordinates are included below may be seen in a map.

There are 11 properties and districts listed on the National Register in the county.

This National Park Service list is complete through NPS recent listings posted December 12, 2025.

== Current listings ==
	Name on the Register	Image	Date listed	Location	City or town	Description
1	Aebischer Site (47CT30)	Aebischer Site (47CT30)	October 10, 1985 (#85003136)	Address restricted	Chilton	Four archaeological sites ranging from 9000 BC to 1900 AD, located within the Killsnake Wildlife Area, including a Paleo-Indian site which has produced Clovis-like fluted points.
2	Calumet County Courthouse	Calumet County Courthouse	March 9, 1982 (#82000640)	206 Court St. 44°01′48″N 88°10′07″W	Chilton	Neoclassical courthouse with center dome, built in 1913 and designed by B. Mehner, who designed the similar Taylor County Courthouse.
3	Calumet County Park Group	Calumet County Park Group	December 29, 1997 (#97001551)	Address restricted	Hilbert	Six effigy mounds of panthers or water spirits, on the escarpment overlooking Lake Winnebago.
4	Chilton Post Office	Chilton Post Office	October 24, 2000 (#00001249)	57 E. Main St. 44°01′45″N 88°09′38″W	Chilton	Red-brick Georgian Revival building built by the Public Works Administration in 1938, containing a 1940 mural by Charles W. Thwaites: "Threshing Barley."
5	Haese Memorial Village Historic District	Haese Memorial Village Historic District	March 2, 1982 (#82000641)	Milwaukee and Randolph Sts; 44°12′28″N 88°08′32″W	Forest Junction	Remnant business district of a town that formed where two railroads crossed, then withered as logging faded, as the automobile replaced the train, and as Appleton grew. Structures include the 1884 Haese General Store (pictured), the 1908 Hunt hardware store, a summer kitchen, and the 1908 Haese gas station.
6	High Cliff Mounds	High Cliff Mounds	January 25, 1997 (#96001629)	Address restricted	Sherwood	Effigy mound group on the escarpment at High Cliff State Park, including panther mounds, conical and linear.
7	Ridge Group	Ridge Group	December 8, 1978 (#78000079)	Address restricted	Brothertown	Collection of mounds, enclosures & burial grounds built by Woodland people.
8	Gottlieb and Beata Stanelle Farmhouse		December 27, 2023 (#100009675)	W2020 Schmidt Road; 44°13′38″N 88°08′24″W	Brillion	2-story Italianate-style farmhouse with a cupola on top and a 1-story wing, built in 1887 for the Stanelles, who immigrated from Silesia. Gottlieb was a progressive farmer, who turned early to dairying and who threshed for neighbors with his mechanical threshing machine.
9	Stockbridge Harbor	Stockbridge Harbor	September 3, 1998 (#98001089)	Address restricted	Stockbridge	Site of a palisaded village, possibly built around 1100 CE by a mix of effigy mound and Late Woodland people.
10	Stockbridge Indian Cemetery	Stockbridge Indian Cemetery	October 22, 1980 (#80000111)	N of Stockbridge off WI 55; 44°04′56″N 88°18′03″W	Stockbridge	Small burial ground of a farming community of Stockbridge Indians from around the 1820s to 1856, since moved to Shawano County. Burials include John Quinney.
11	Herman C. Timm House	Herman C. Timm House	July 5, 1996 (#96000727)	1600 Main St. 43°57′00″N 88°05′08″W	New Holstein	The initial modest house built in 1872 was expanded and remodeled in a grand Stick style in 1892. Timm was a German immigrant who built a grain elevator in New Holstein, served as village president, and founded the State Bank. Now a museum.

== See also ==
- List of National Historic Landmarks in Wisconsin
- National Register of Historic Places listings in Wisconsin
- Listings in neighboring counties: Brown, Fond du Lac, Manitowoc, Outagamie, Sheboygan, Winnebago
