= Schildhauer =

Schildhauer is a German surname. Notable people with the surname include:

- Edward Schildhauer (1872–1953), chief engineer on the Panama Canal project
- Ferdinand Schildhauer (1855–1926), German architect
- Johannes Schildhauer (1918–1995), German historian
- Werner Schildhauer (born 1959), German athlete
