= Calumet County Parks =

Parks in Wisconsin, United States

Calumet County, Wisconsin, maintains three county parks Calumet County Park, Becker's Lake Park and Ledge View Nature Center and Brothertown and Stockbridge harbors. The Stockbridge harbor is on the List of Registered Historic Places in Wisconsin. Calumet County Park is under the Calumet County Park Group, an archeological site listed on the National Register of Historic Places. Ledge View Nature Center has a nature center which explains the geology of the area.

== Ledge View Nature Center ==
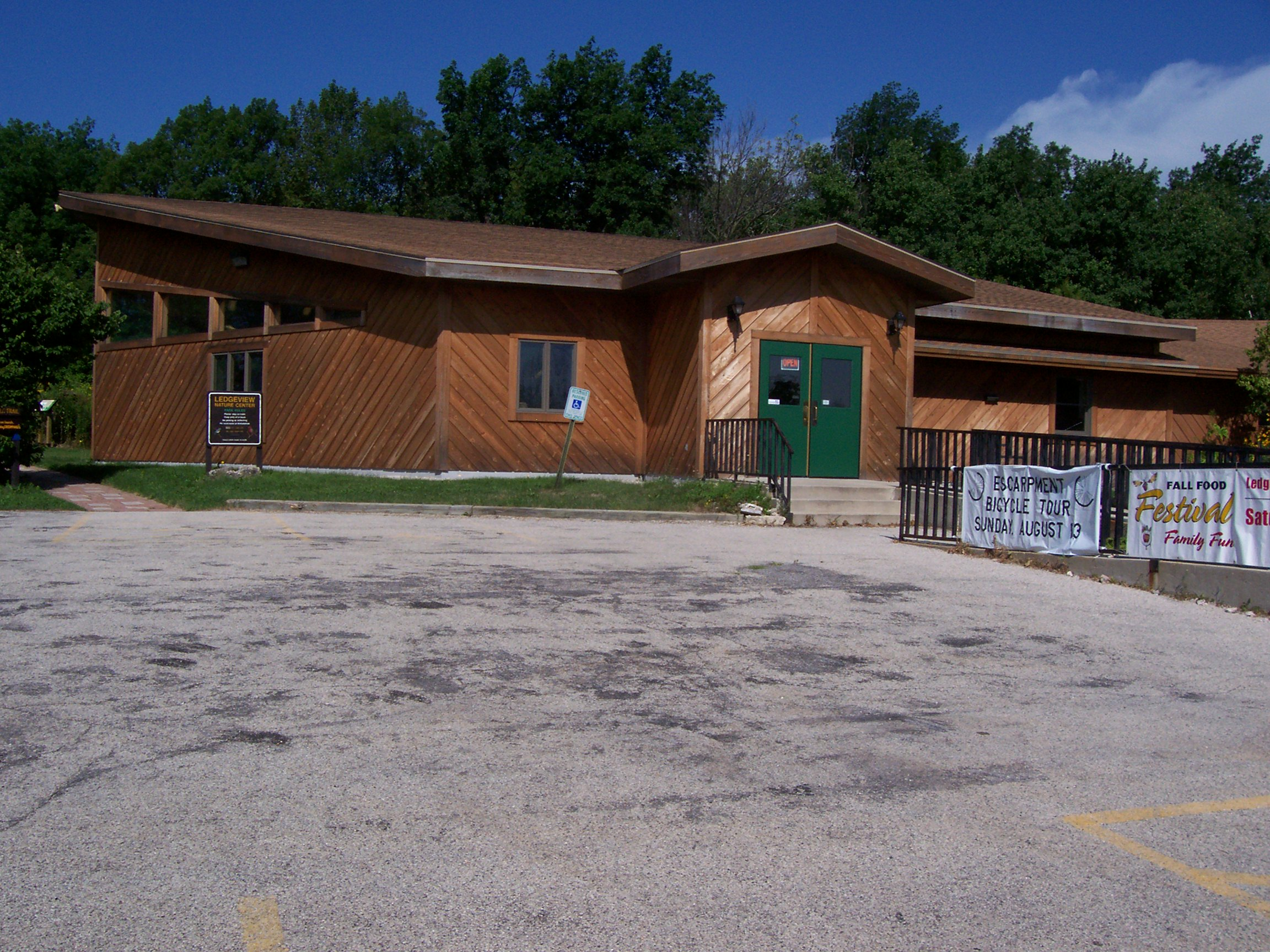
Nature Center at Ledgeview Park

Ledge View Nature Center is located two miles south of Chilton, Wisconsin. The nature center was built in 1981.

Visitors can walk or ski trails, or visit a nature center which explains the geology of the area, including the drumlins, Niagara Escarpment and other post-glacial features. There are several caves that visitors can tour by appointment. There is a tower where visitors can view the countryside and Chilton. The park features three natural solution caves.

== Calumet County Park ==
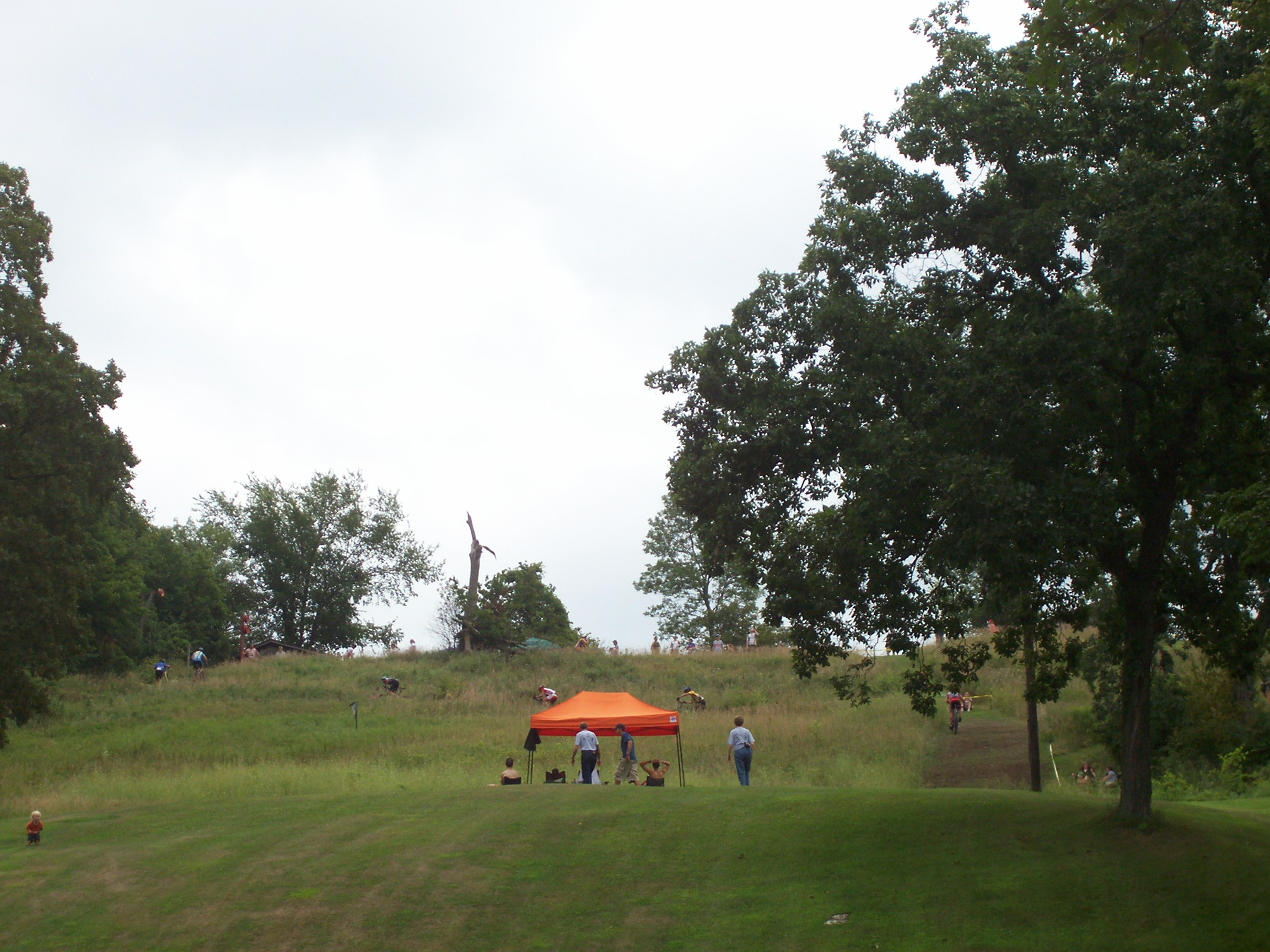
WORS drivers climbing the ski hill at the Calumet County Park

Calumet County Park is located approximately four miles northwest of Stockbridge, Wisconsin along the east shore of Lake Winnebago. Visitors can camp in the summer, walk trails in the summer, and downhill ski in the winter. The Niagara Escarpment is prominent in the park. The park contains a post-Civil War brickyard. There are several Native American effigy mounds in the upper campground portion of the park. It is open all year round.

Based on its name, it seems possible that part or all of Calumet county park group, an archeological site listed on the national register of historic places, is within this or other Calumet County parks. The location of the archeological site is not disclosed.

== Becker's Lake Park ==
Becker's Lake Park is the newest addition to the park system. Prairie grass has been planted, and wetlands have been constructed.

== Brothertown and Stockbridge harbors ==
The harbors are located near the city of Stockbridge, and the town of Brothertown, and both are part of the Calumet County Parks system. The Stockbridge harbor is on the list of registered historic places in Wisconsin.

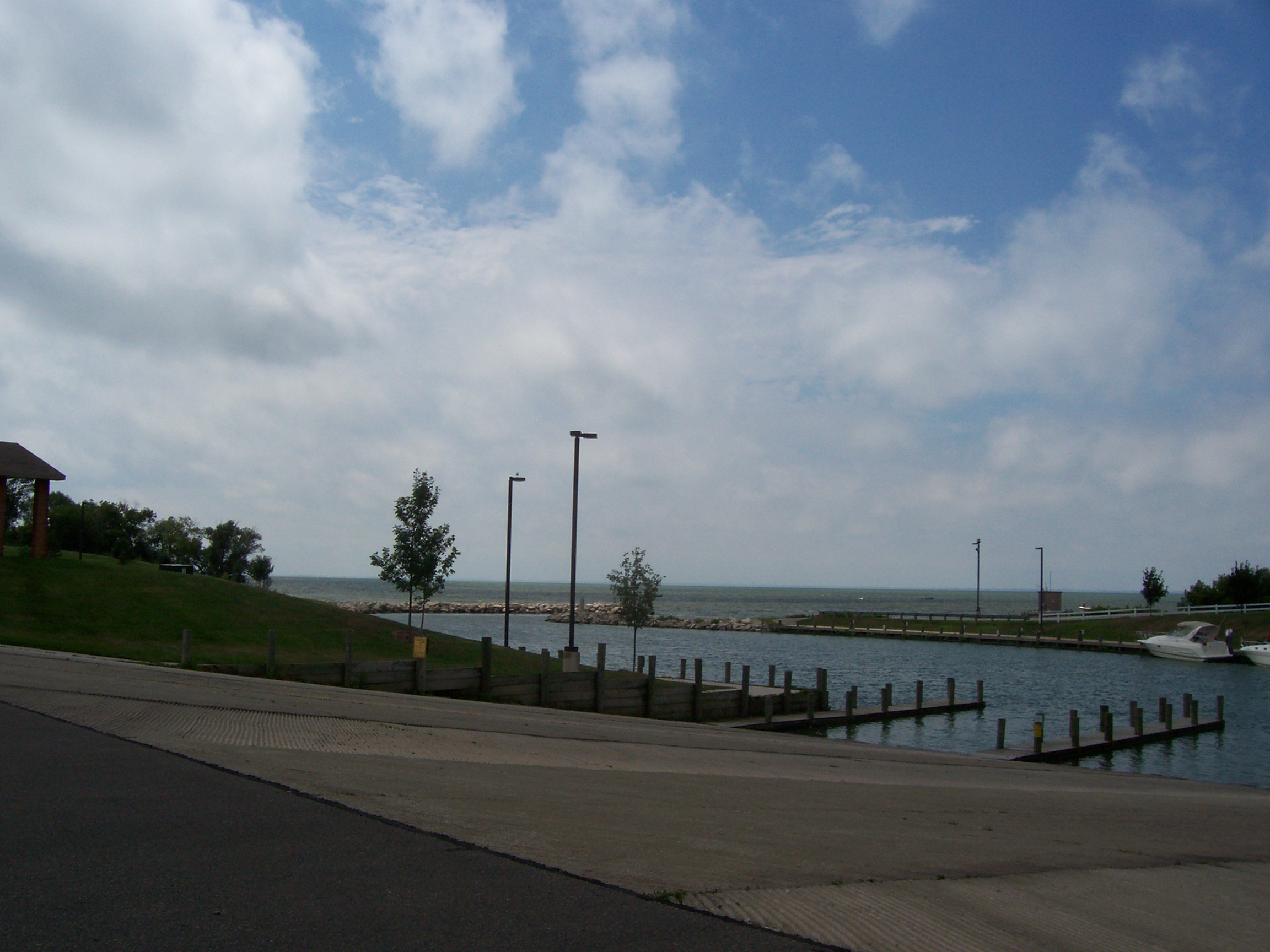
Stockbridge Harbor

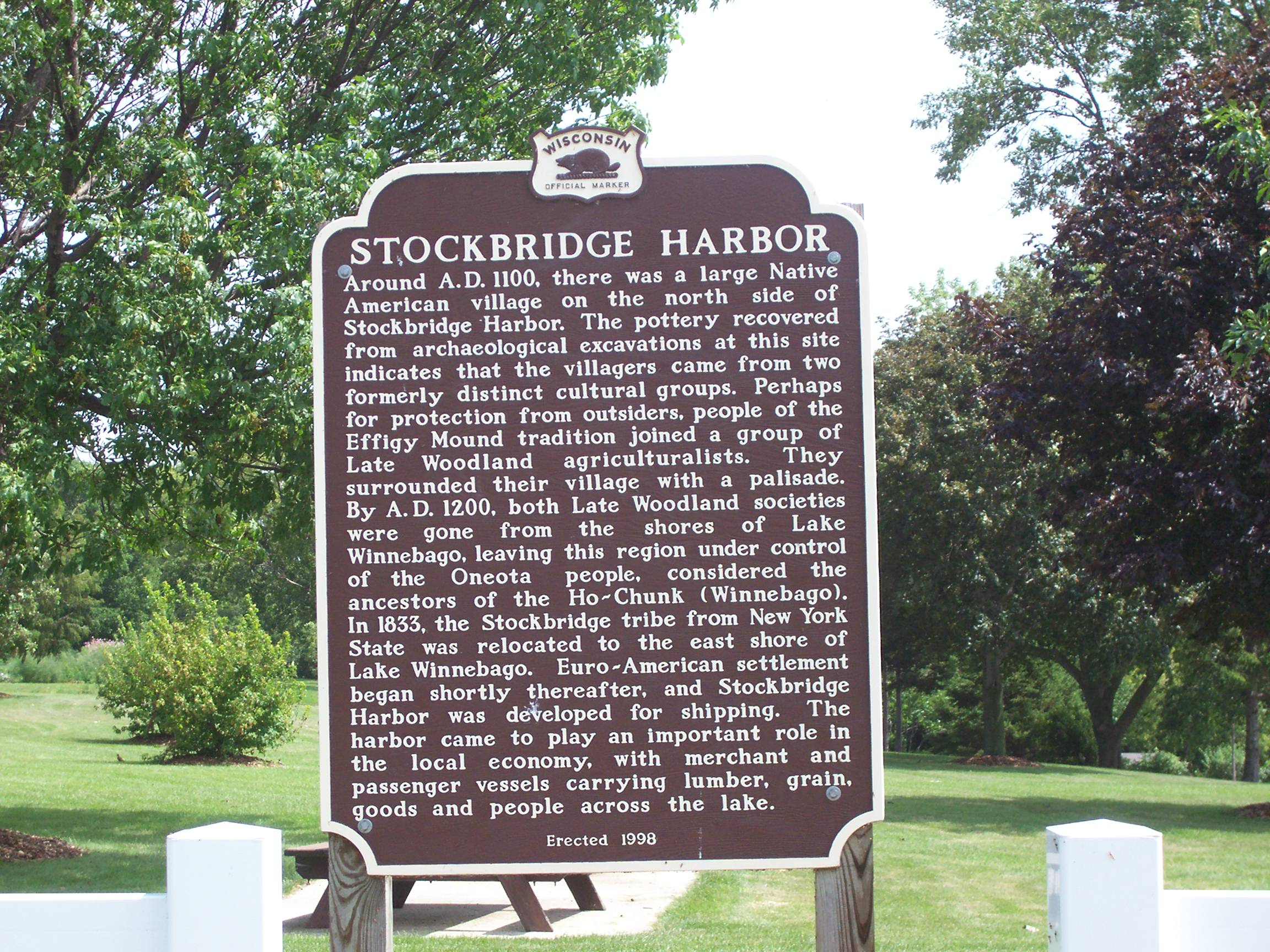
Stockbridge Harbor official marker

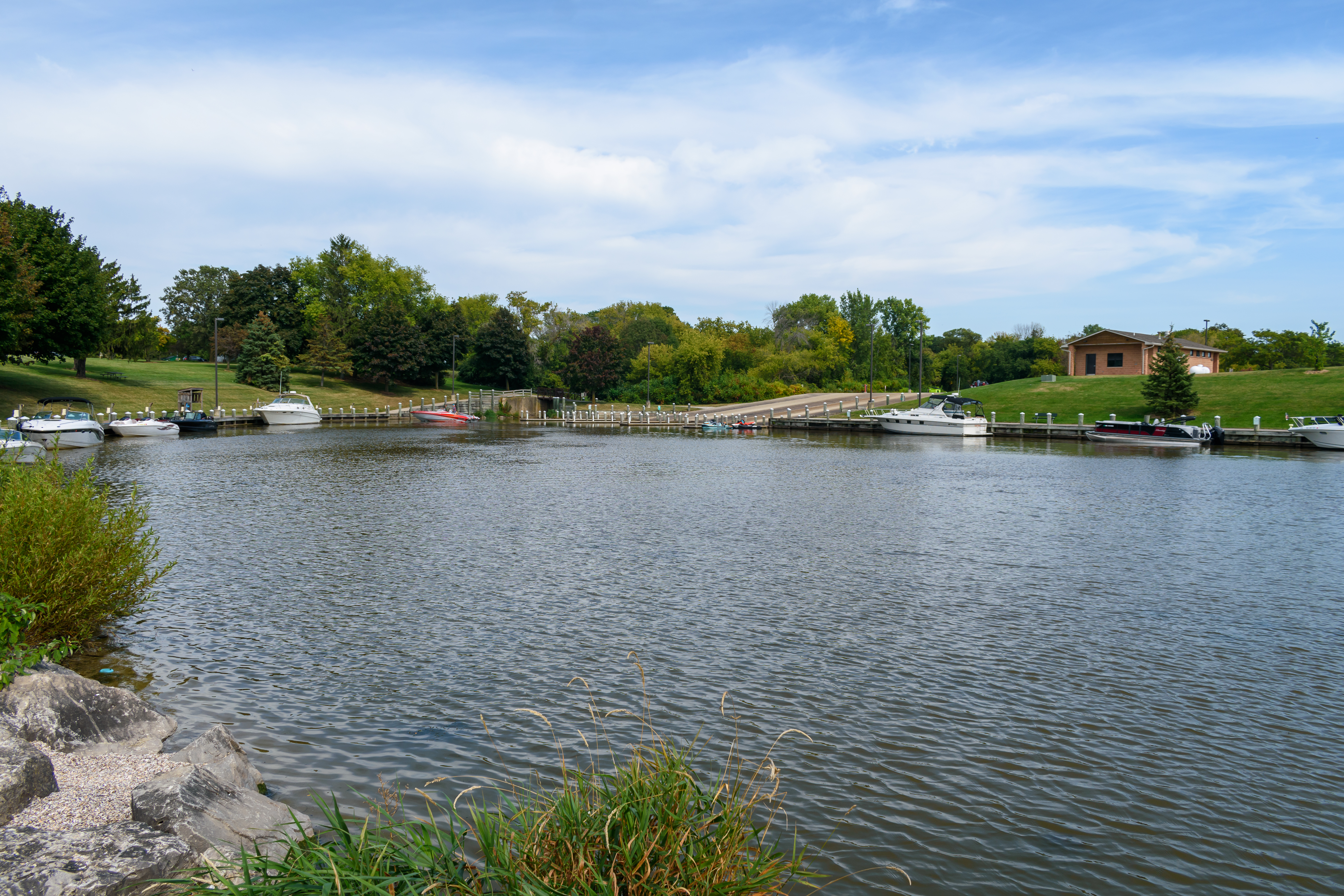
Stockbridge Harbor, September 2024
