= High Cliff State Park =

State Park in Calumet County, Wisconsin

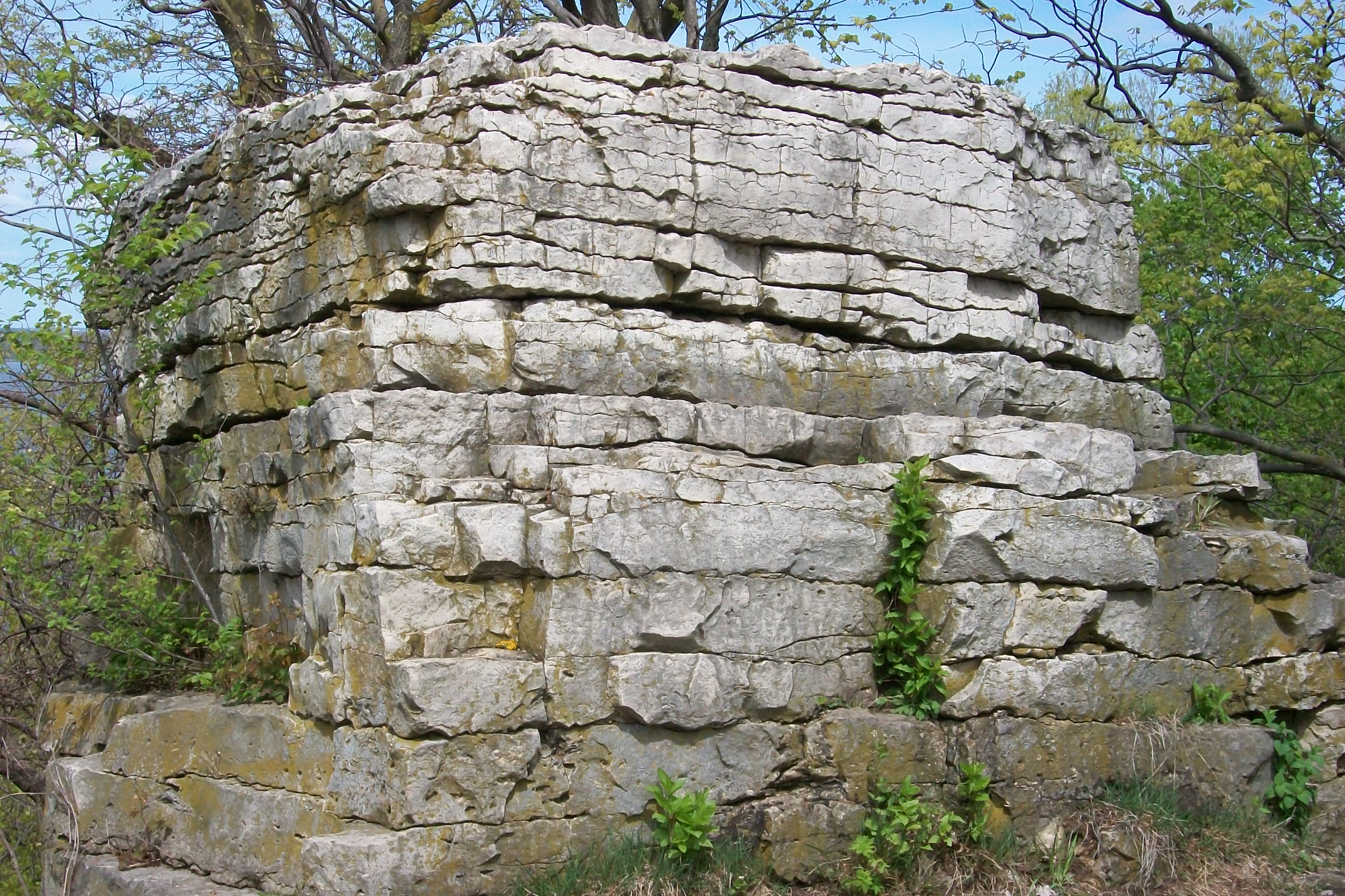
- View of the outcrop on top of the bluff

- Location within Wisconsin Location within the United States
- Interactive map of High Cliff State Park
- Location: Calumet County, Wisconsin, United States
- Nearest city: Appleton
- Coordinates: 44°09′33″N 88°17′22″W
- Area: 1,187 acres (480 ha)
- Established: 1954
- Administrator: Wisconsin Department of Natural Resources
- Website: Official website
Wisconsin State Parks
- High Cliff Mounds
- U.S. National Register of Historic Places
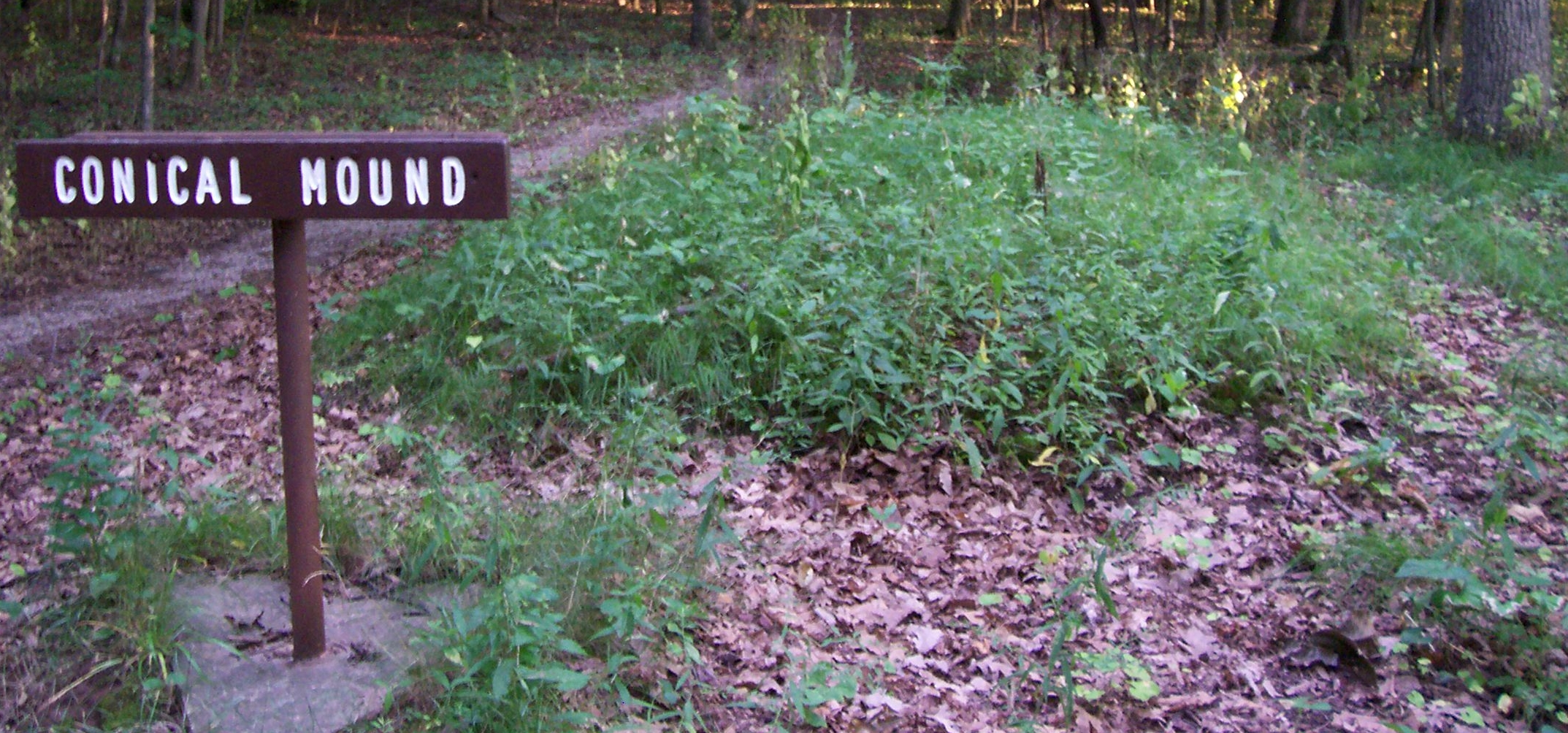
- Location: Calumet County, Wisconsin, USA
- Nearest city: Sherwood
- Built: 500–1500 AD
- NRHP reference No.: 96001629
- Added to NRHP: January 25, 1997

High Cliff State Park is a 1,187-acre (480 ha) Wisconsin state park near Sherwood, Wisconsin. It is the only state-owned recreation area located on Lake Winnebago. The park got its name from cliffs of the Niagara Escarpment, a land formation east of the shore of Lake Winnebago that stretches north through northeast Wisconsin, Upper Michigan, and Ontario to Niagara Falls and New York State.

A new Master Plan for the park created in 2013 aims to nearly double the size of the park, to add new amenities, and expand conservation efforts.

== Features ==
A statue of the Winnebago (Ho-Chunk) leader Red Bird overlooks the northeast end of Lake Winnebago.

The north shoreline of Lake Winnebago can be seen from a 40-foot-tall (12 m) observation tower at the top of the escarpment. Various trails are available for biking, horseback riding, cross-country skiing, snowshoeing, and snowmobiling. Hiking trails include the .6-mile (0.97 km) limestone-surfaced Indian Mound Trail. The park also offers camping, picnicking, boating, swimming, fishing, and hunting.

== Effigy mounds ==
The effigy mounds at the top of the escarpment have led to a small part of the park being added to the National Register of Historic Places, listed as High Cliff Mounds. A trail meanders through six long-tailed mounds and several conical mounds. Out of the original 30 effigy mounds in High Cliff, only nine remain, among them a panther mound that reaches 285 feet in length, as well as mounds presenting a bird and one that was most likely a bear. The mounds are consistent with other mound groups found at the peak of the Niagara Escarpment along the eastern shore of Lake Winnebago, including the Calumet County Park Group.

== Gallery ==
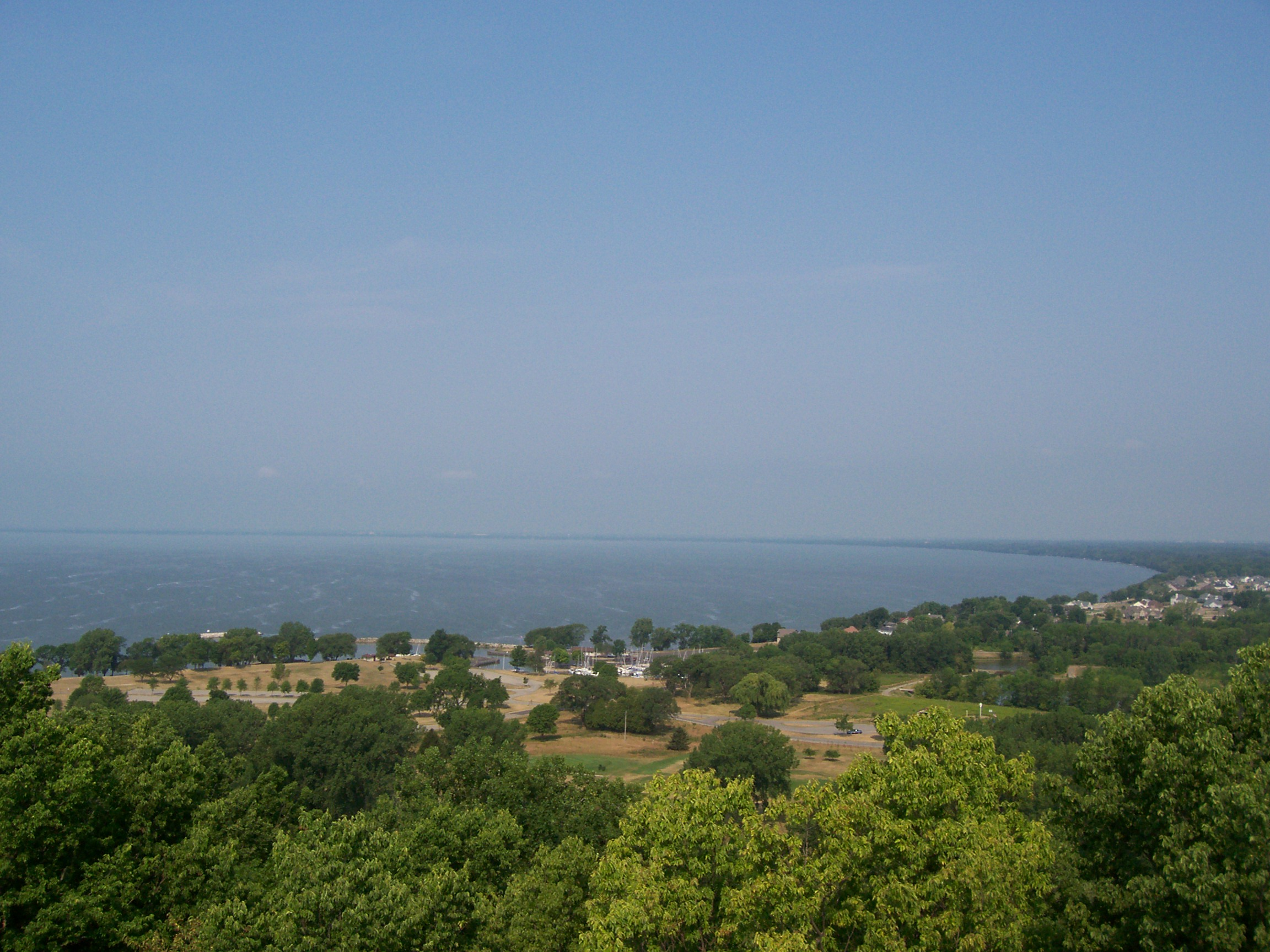
The north end of Lake Winnebago taken from the park's observation tower

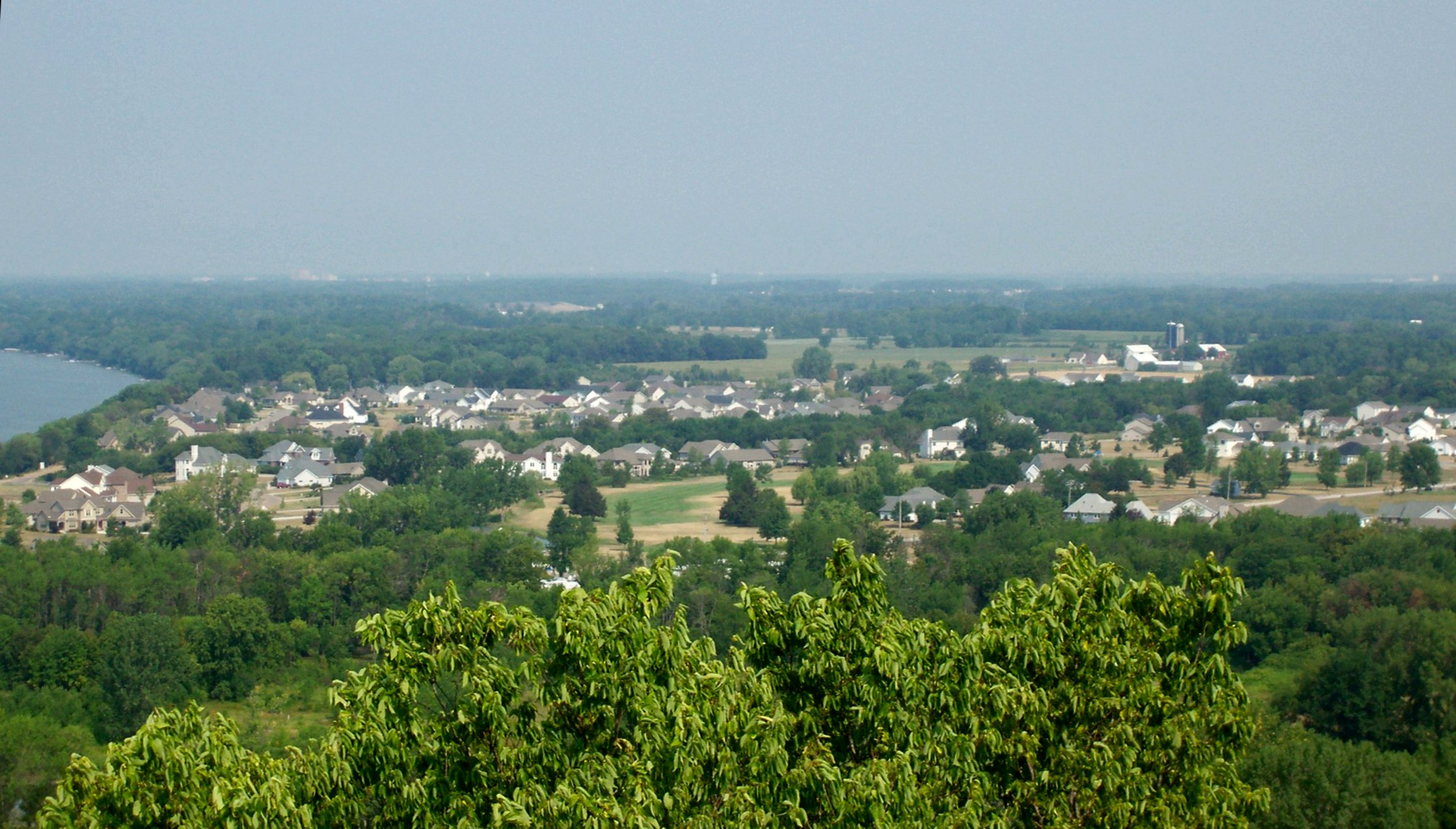
Looking west at the southwest corner of Sherwood, Wisconsin and the north tip of Lake Winnebago taken from the park's observation tower

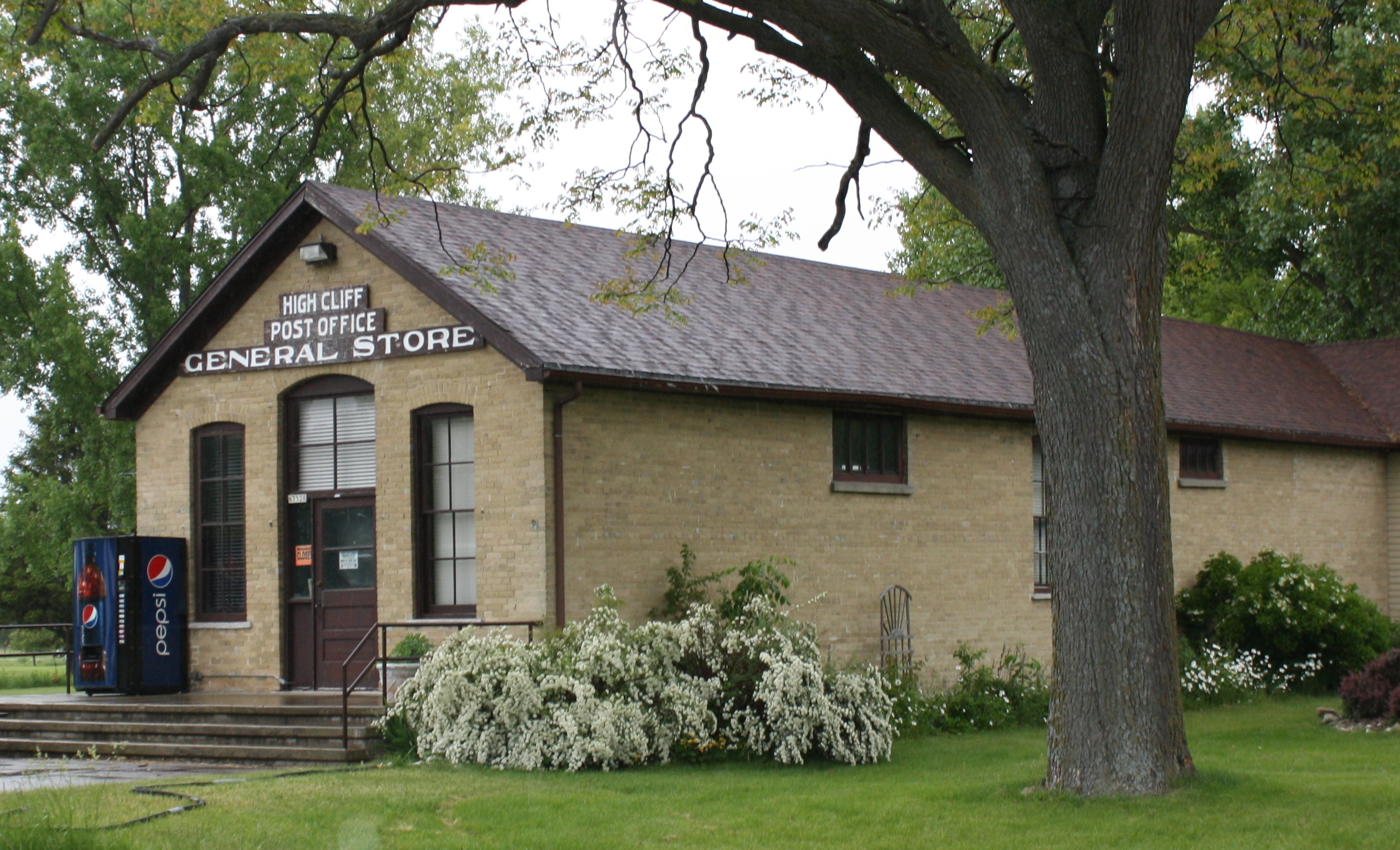
General store and post office

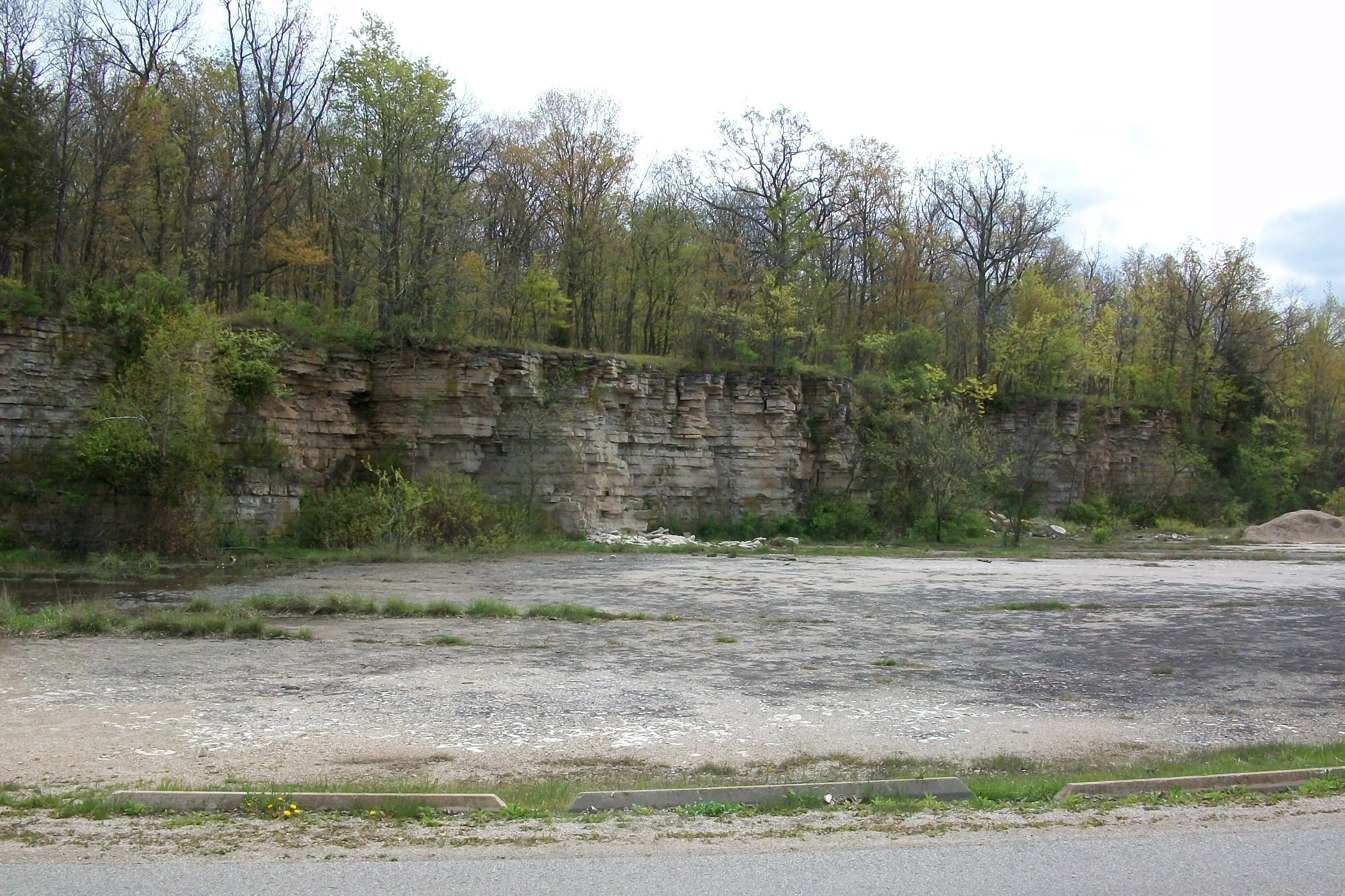
View of the cliff faces

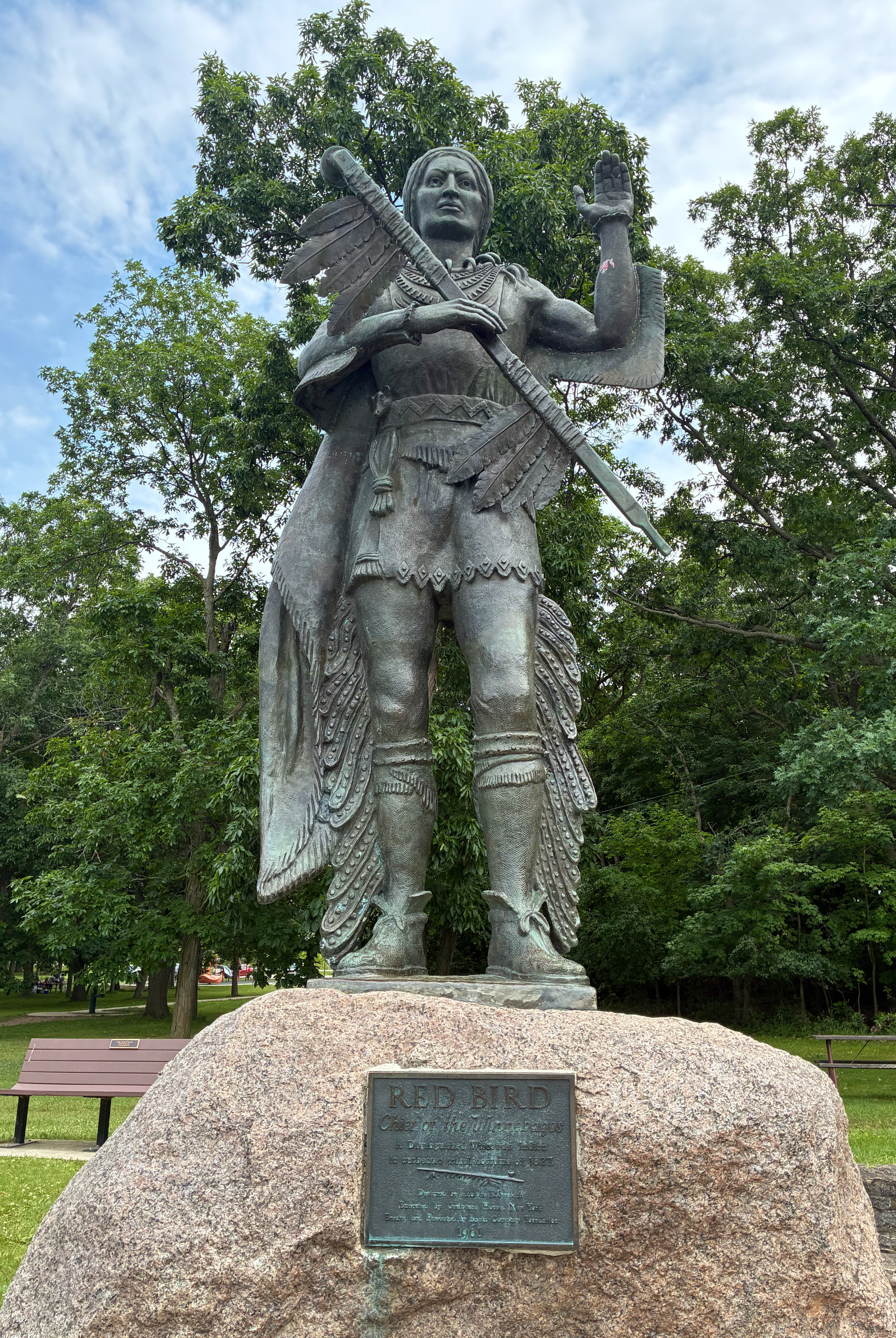
Statue of Red Bird

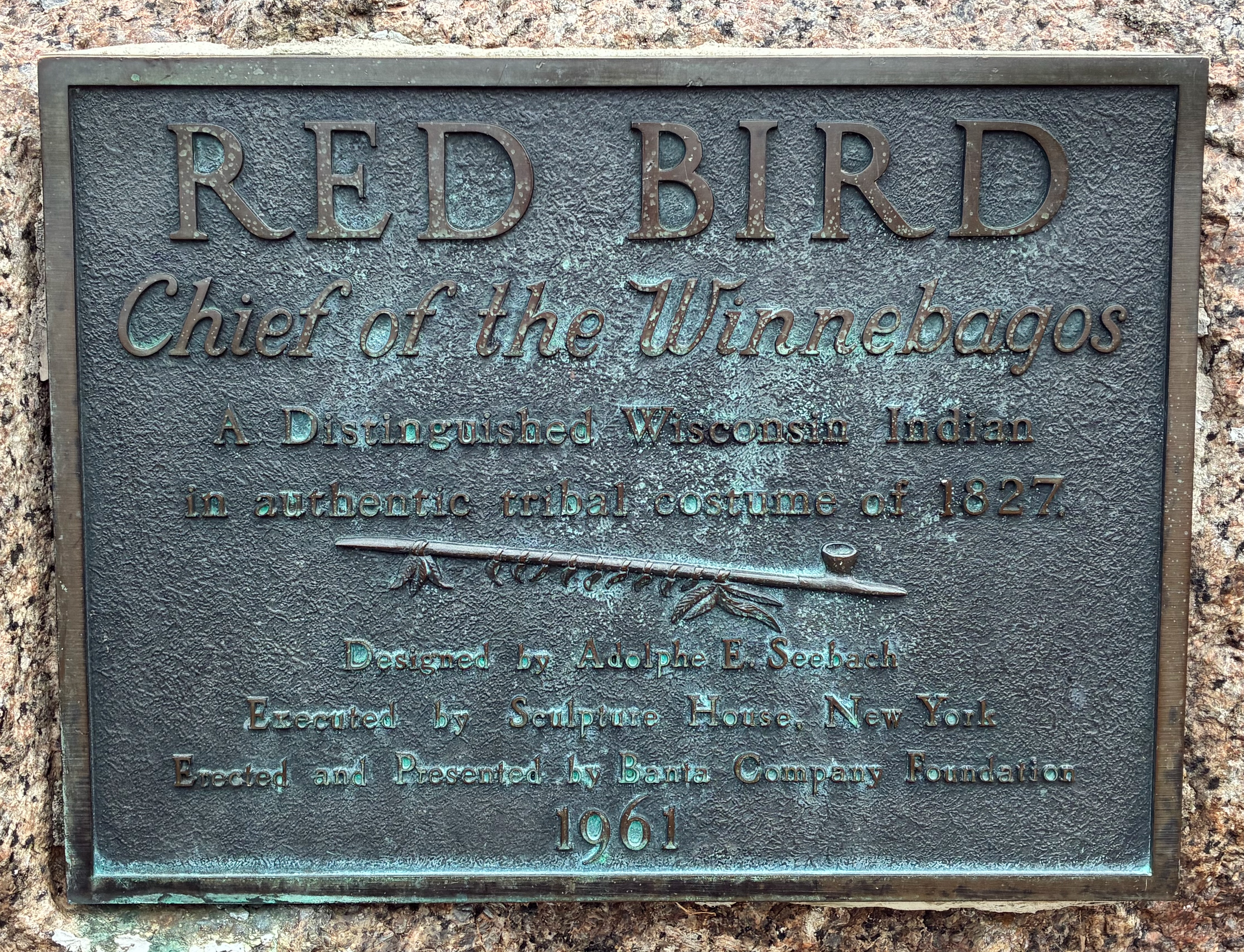
Red Bird statue plaque

== See also ==
- Mound
- Mound builder (people)
- Earthwork (archaeology)
- List of burial mounds in the United States
