= Stick style =

Late-19th-century American architectural style

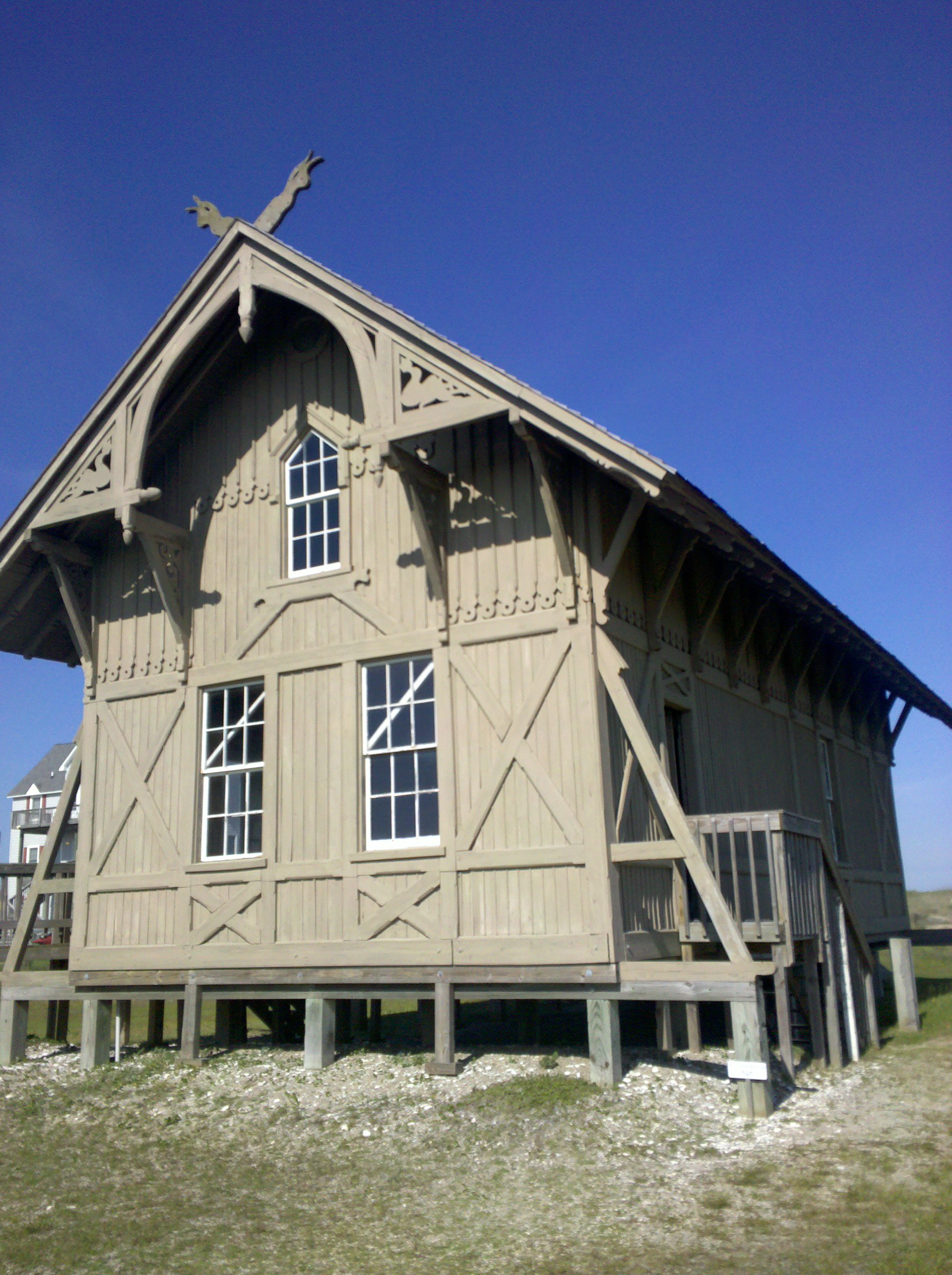
The 1874 Chicamacomico Life-Saving Station, Rodanthe, North Carolina. Note the prominent trussing and visual use of vertical columns.

The Stick style was a late-19th-century American architectural style, transitional between the Carpenter Gothic style of the mid-19th century, and the Queen Anne style that it had evolved into by the 1890s. It is named after its use of linear "stickwork" (overlay board strips) on the outside walls to mimic an exposed half-timbered frame.

== Characteristics ==
The style sought to bring a translation of the balloon framing that had risen in popularity during the middle of the century, by alluding to it through plain trim boards, soffits, aprons, and other decorative features. Stick-style architecture is recognizable by the relatively plain layout, often accented with trusses on the gables or decorative shingles.

The stickwork decoration is not structurally significant, being just narrow planks or thin projections applied over the wall's clapboards. The planks intersect mostly at right angles, and sometimes diagonally as well, resembling the half-timbering of medieval – especially Tudor – buildings.

The style was commonly used in houses, train stations, life-saving stations, and other buildings from the era.

The Stick style did have several characteristics in common with the later Queen Anne style: interpenetrating roof planes with bold panelled brick chimneys, the wrap-around porch, spindle detailing, the "panelled" sectioning of blank wall, radiating spindle details at the gable peaks. Highly stylized and decorative versions of the Stick style are often referred to as Eastlake.

=== Stick–Eastlake ===
Stick–Eastlake is a style term that uses details from the Eastlake movement, started by Charles Eastlake, of decorative arts on stick-style buildings. It is sometimes referred to as Victorian stick, a variation of stick and Eastlake styles. Stick–Eastlake enjoyed modest popularity in the late 19th century, but there are relatively few surviving examples of the style when compared to other more popular styles of Victorian architecture.

== Gallery ==
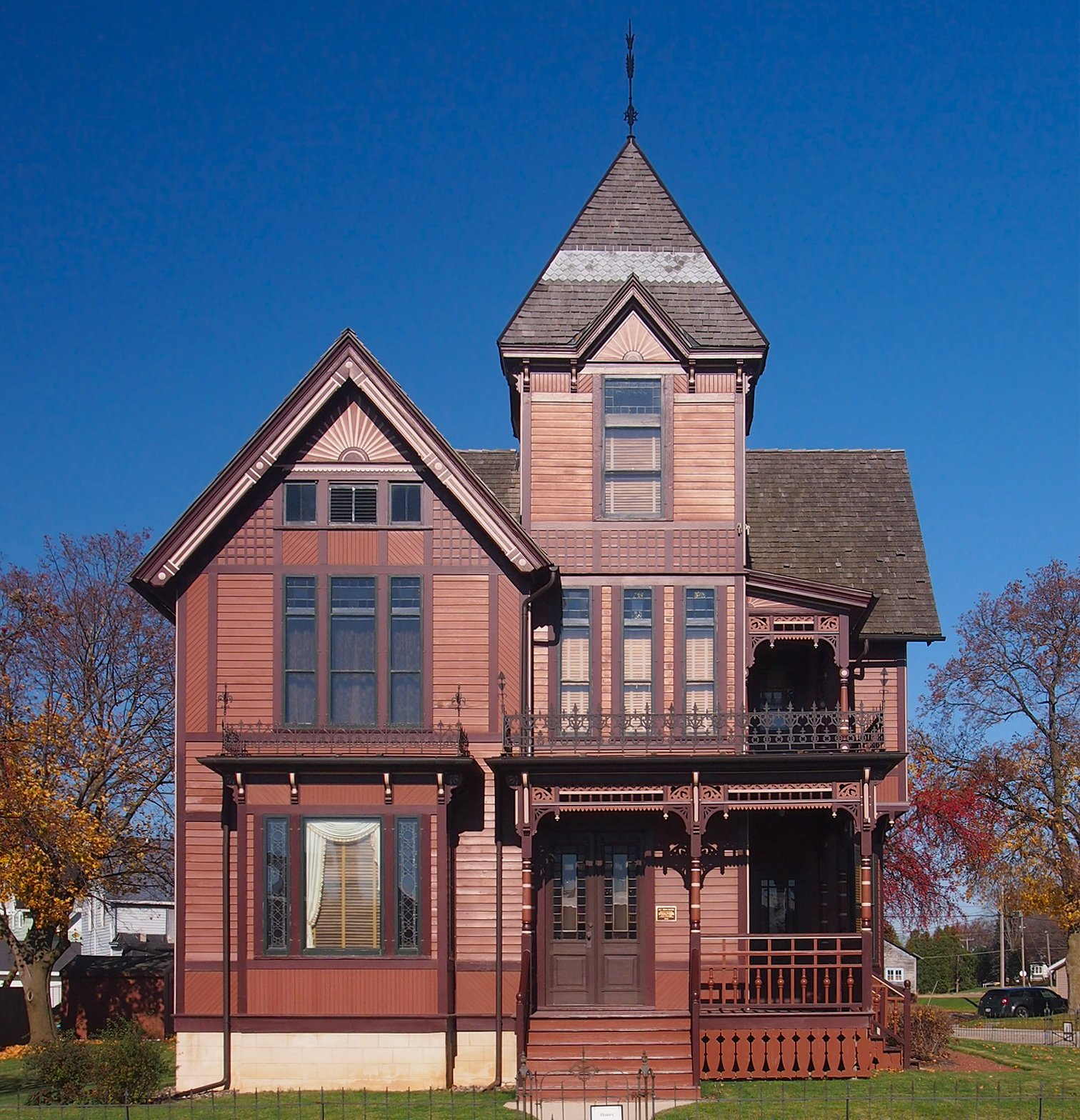
The Herman C. Timm House in New Holstein, Wisconsin, has stickwork painted in a darker brown for contrast.

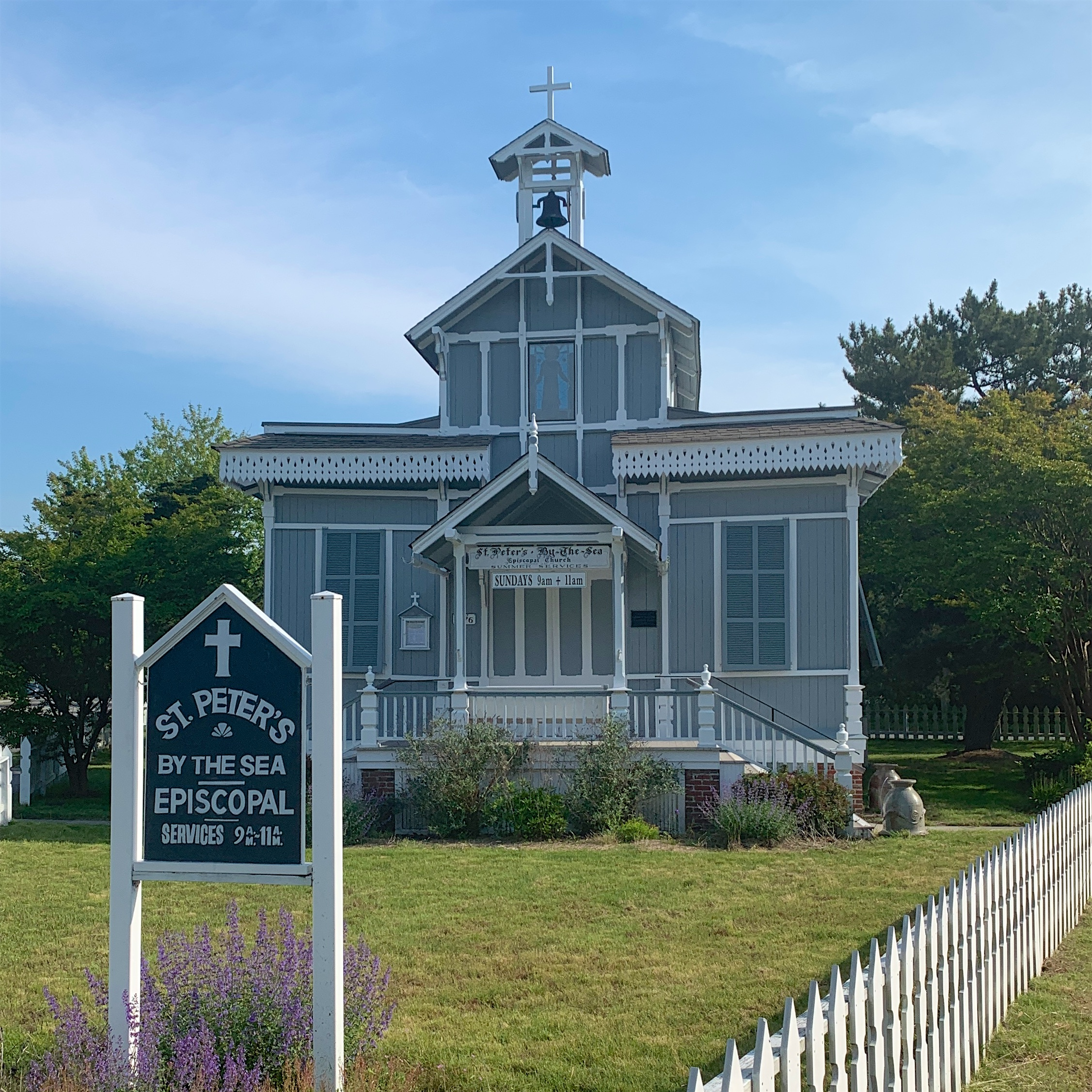
Saint Peter's-By-The-Sea Episcopal Church, Cape May Point, New Jersey, Stick-Eastlake architecture

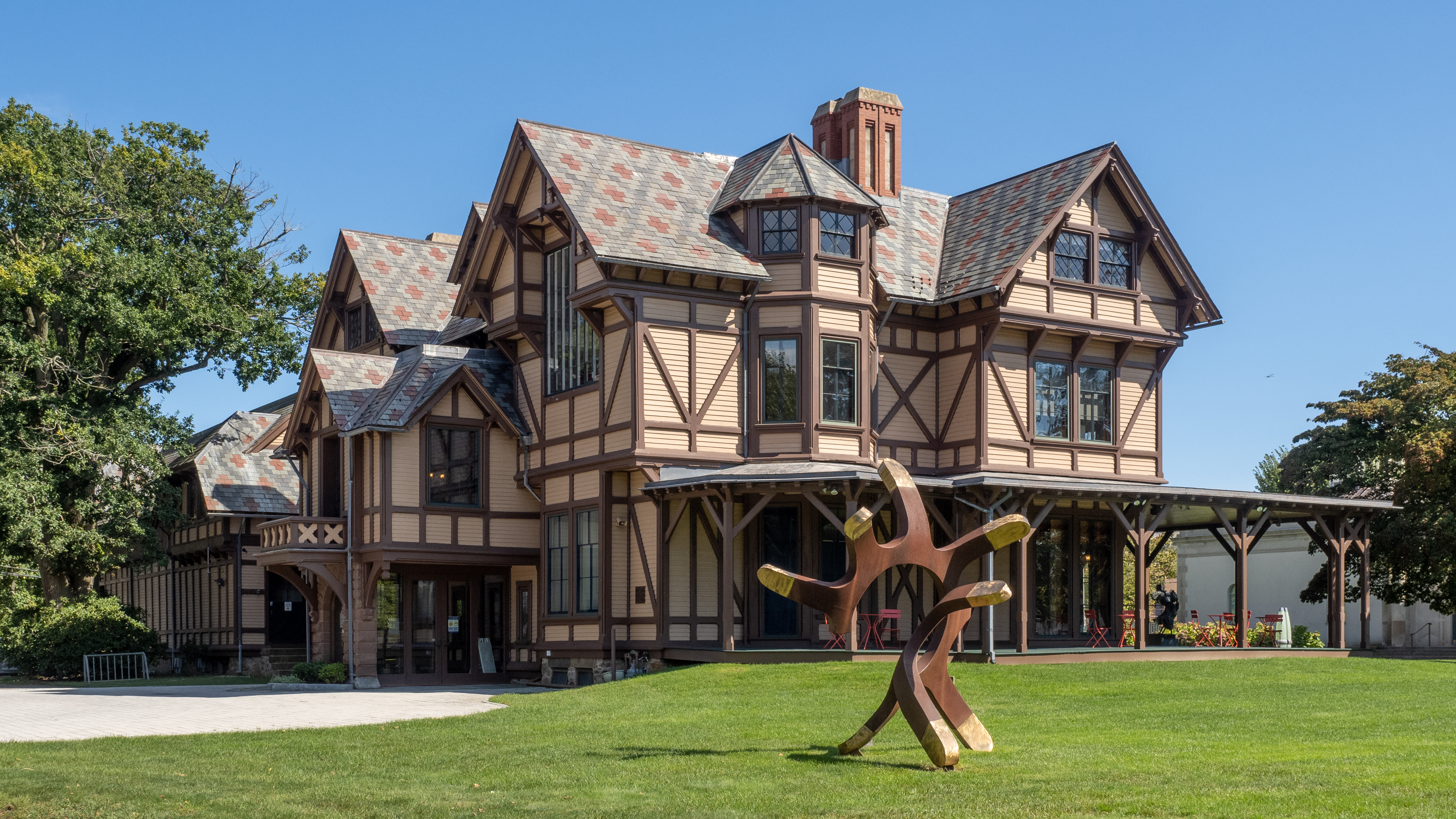
The John N. A. Griswold House in Newport, RI

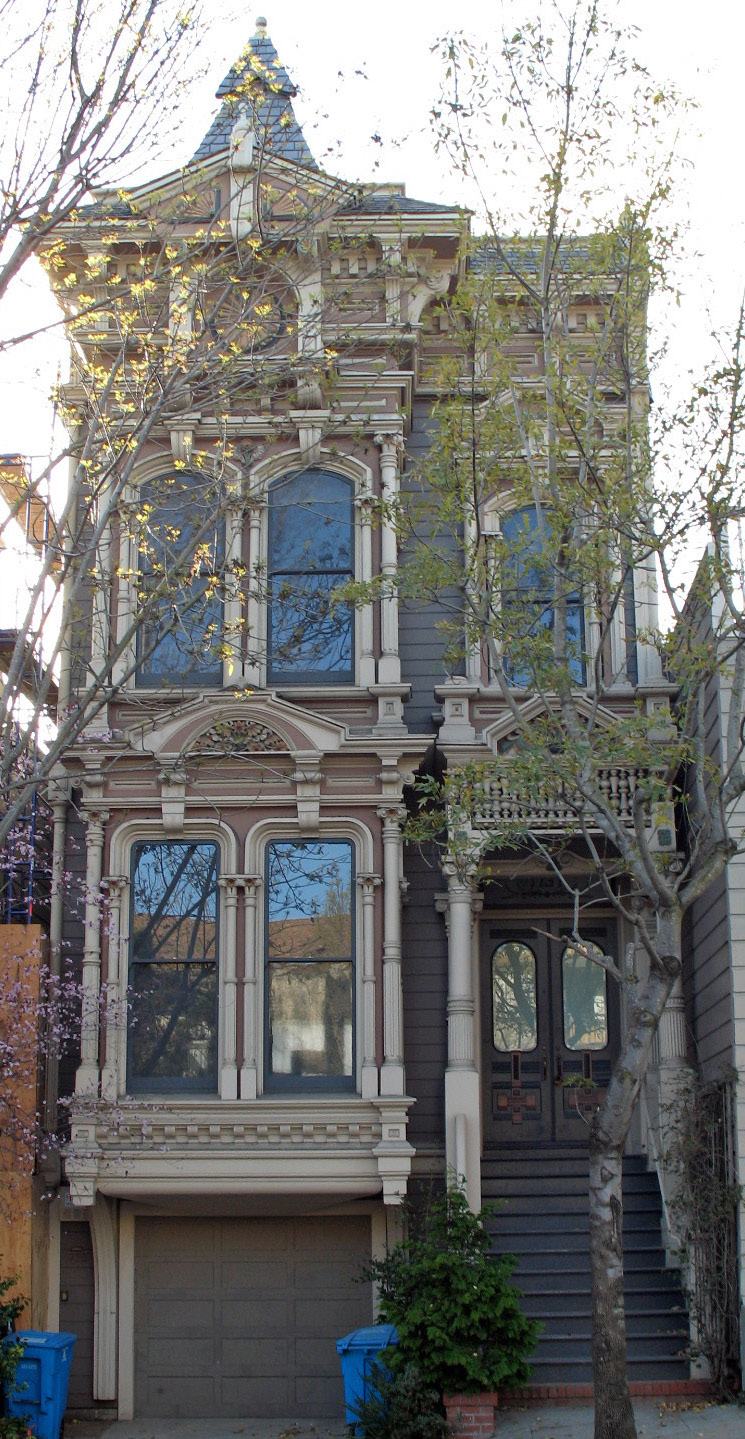
The Vollmer House in San Francisco, CA

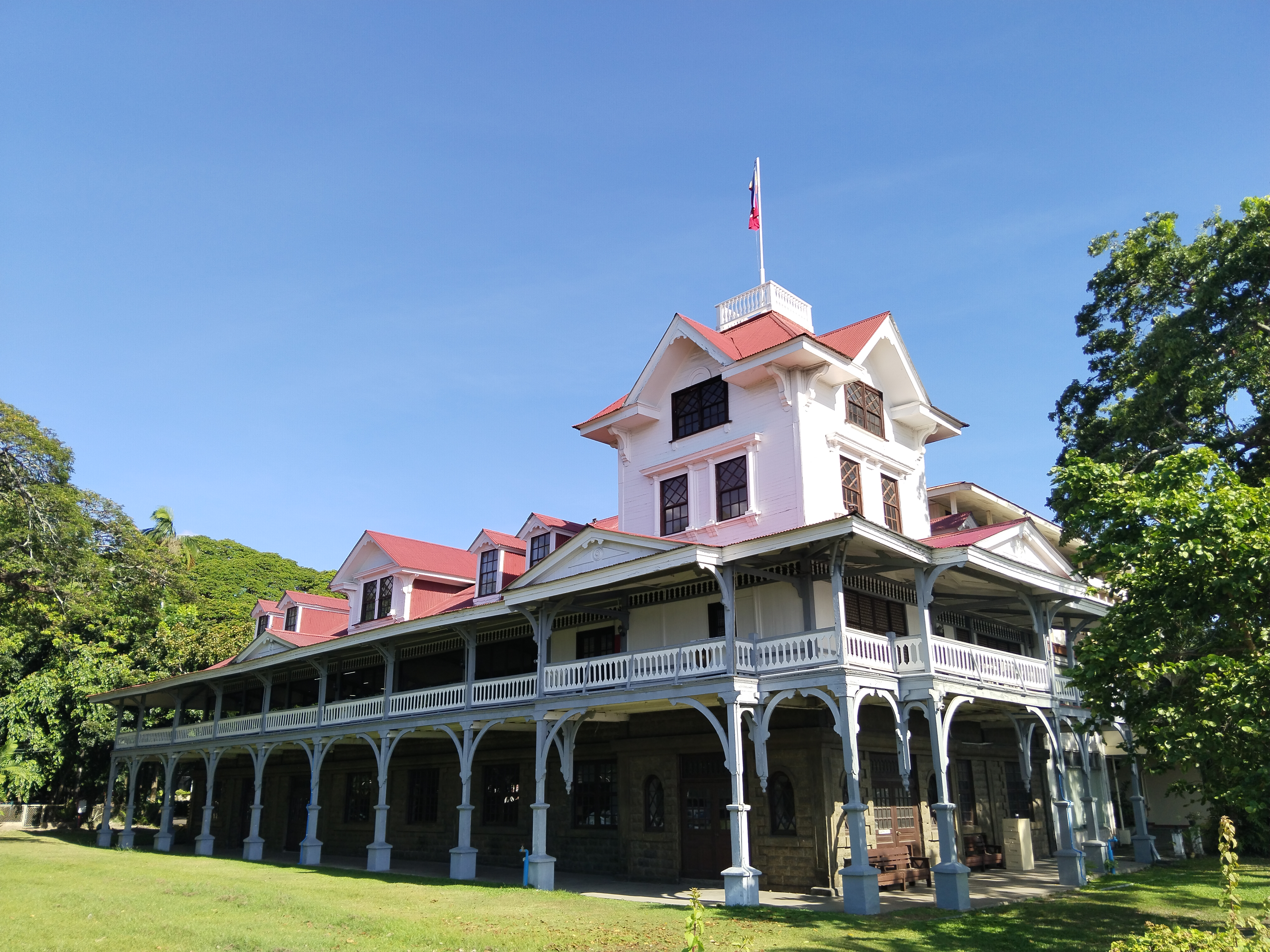
Silliman Hall, at Silliman University, Dumaguete, Philippines

== Examples ==
- Chatham Train Station in Chatham, Massachusetts
- Charles Dietle House in San Francisco, California
- Delaware and Hudson Railroad Passenger Station (Altamont Free Library) in Altamont, New York
- John N. A. Griswold House in Newport, Rhode Island
- Hinds House in Santa Cruz, California
- Orfordville Depot in Orfordville, Wisconsin
- Emlen Physick Estate in Cape May, New Jersey
- John Reichert Farmhouse in Mequon, Wisconsin
- Swampscott Railroad Depot in Swampscott, Massachusetts
- Herman C. Timm House in New Holstein, Wisconsin
- Hereford Inlet lighthouse in North Wildwood, New Jersey
- Point Fermin Lighthouse in San Pedro in Los Angeles, California
- Ladd Carriage House in Portland, Oregon
- Howland Library (Howland Cultural Center) in Beacon, New York
- William J. Clark House in Branford, Connecticut
- Vollmer House in San Francisco, California

== See also ==
- List of architectural styles
