= Herman C. Timm House =

Historic house in Wisconsin, United States

- U.S. National Register of Historic Places
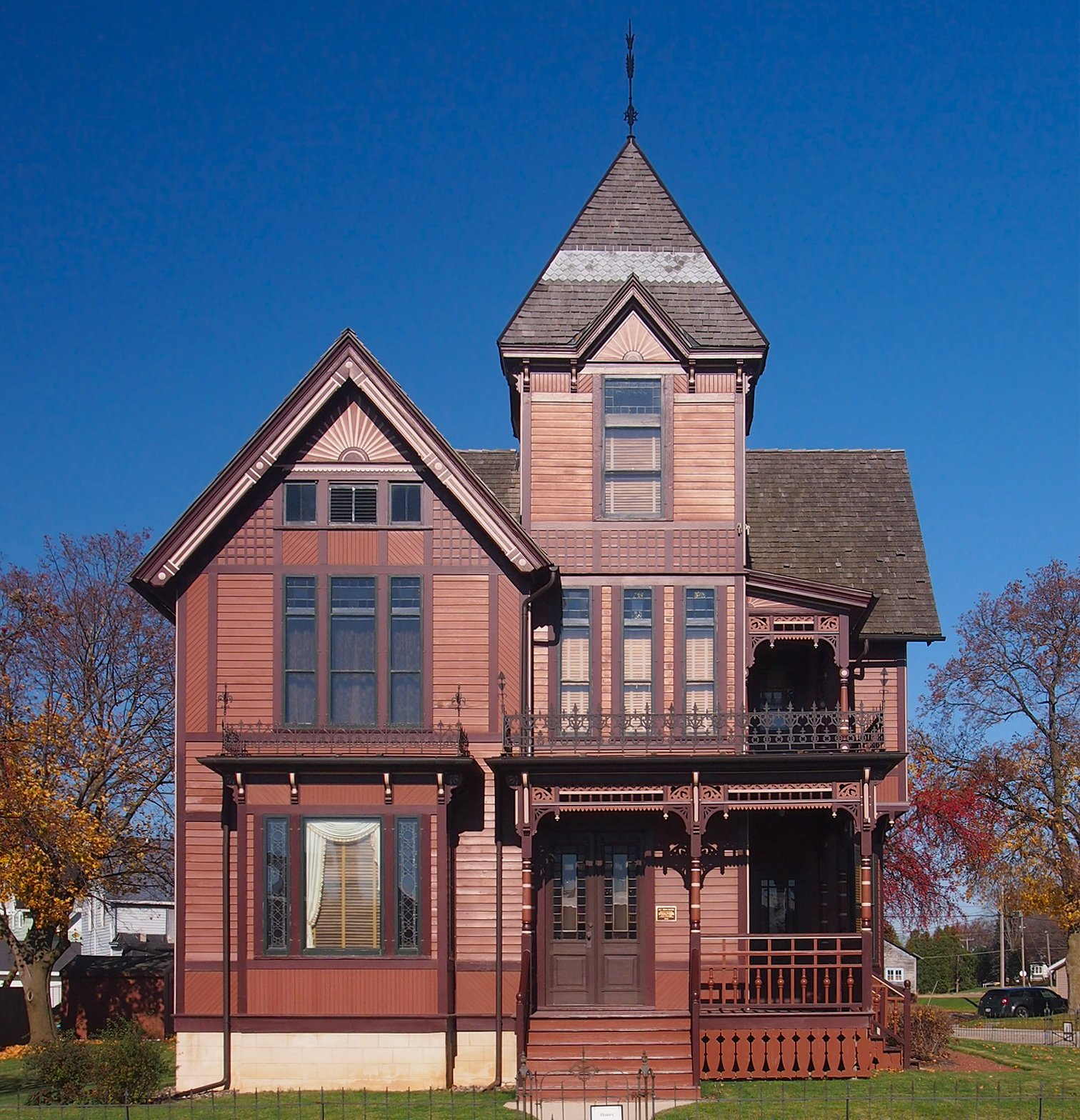
- The Herman C. Timm House from the south

- Location within Wisconsin Location within the United States
- Interactive map showing the location of Herman C. Timm House
- Location: 1600 Main Street, New Holstein, Wisconsin
- Coordinates: 43°57′0″N 88°5′8″W
- Built: 1872
- Architect: August F. Neuman
- Architectural style: Greek Revival, Stick/Eastlake
- NRHP reference No.: 96000727
- Added to NRHP: July 05, 1996

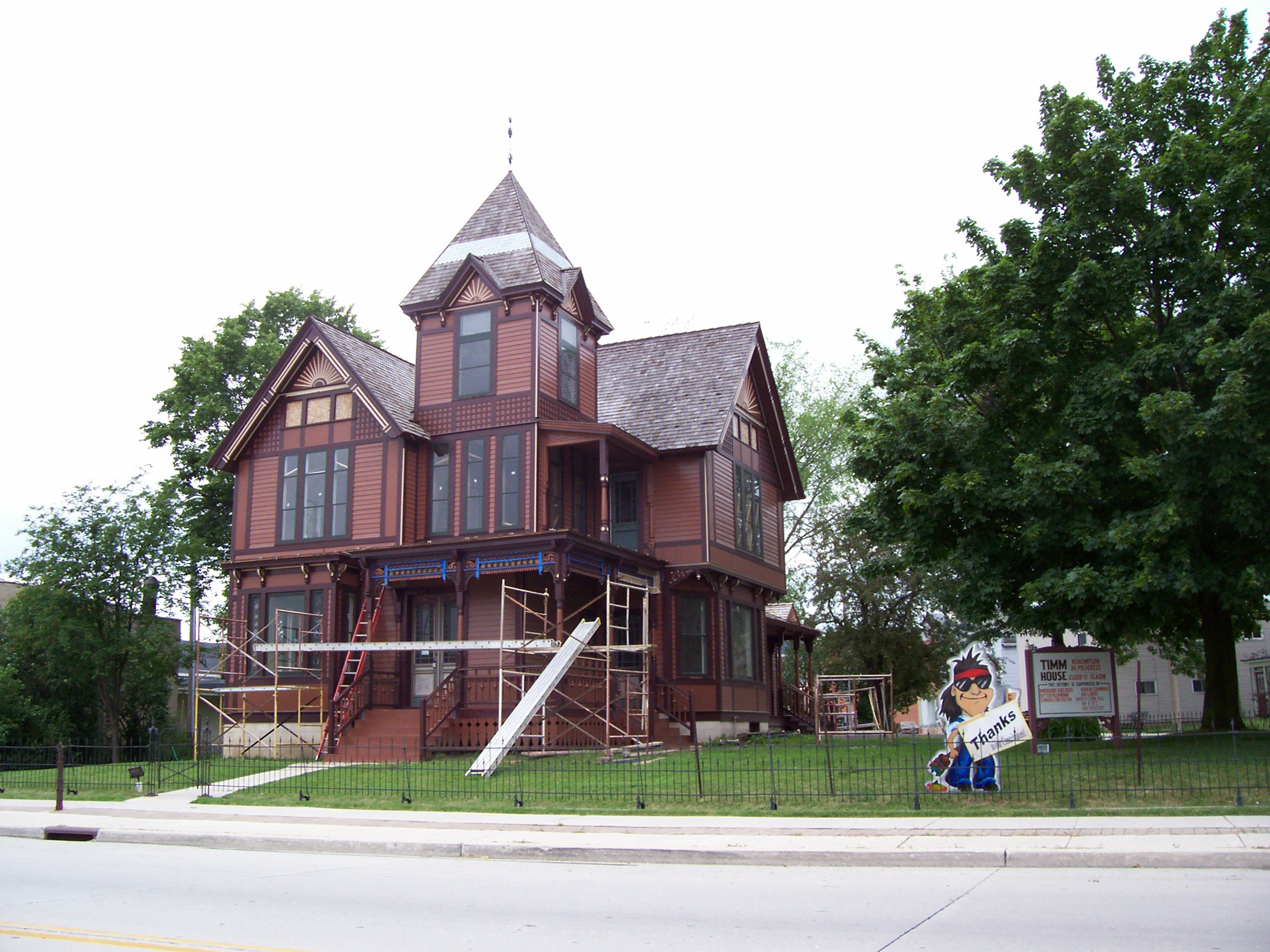
H. C. Timm House during 2006 reconstruction

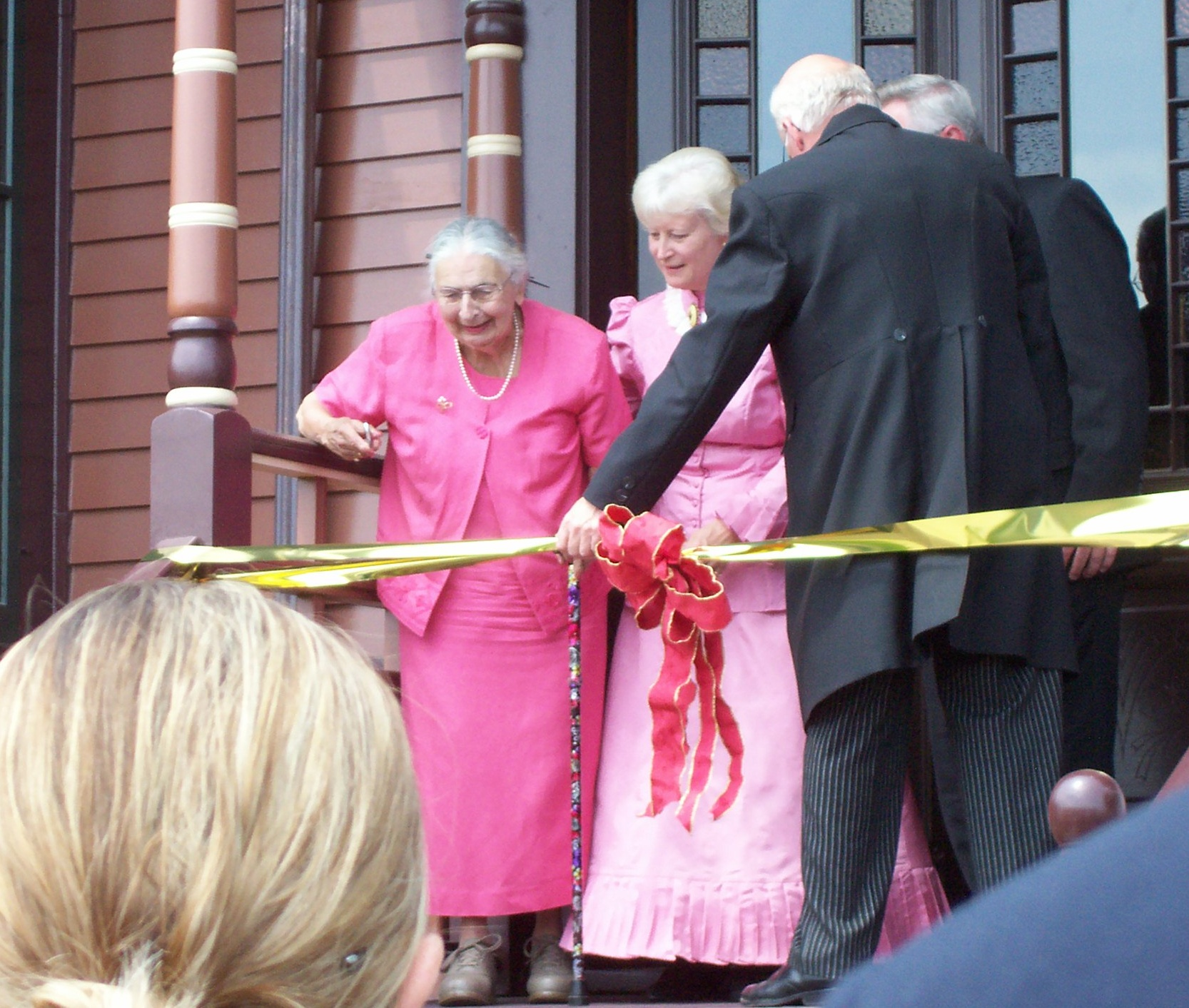
Ribbon cutting at the rededication

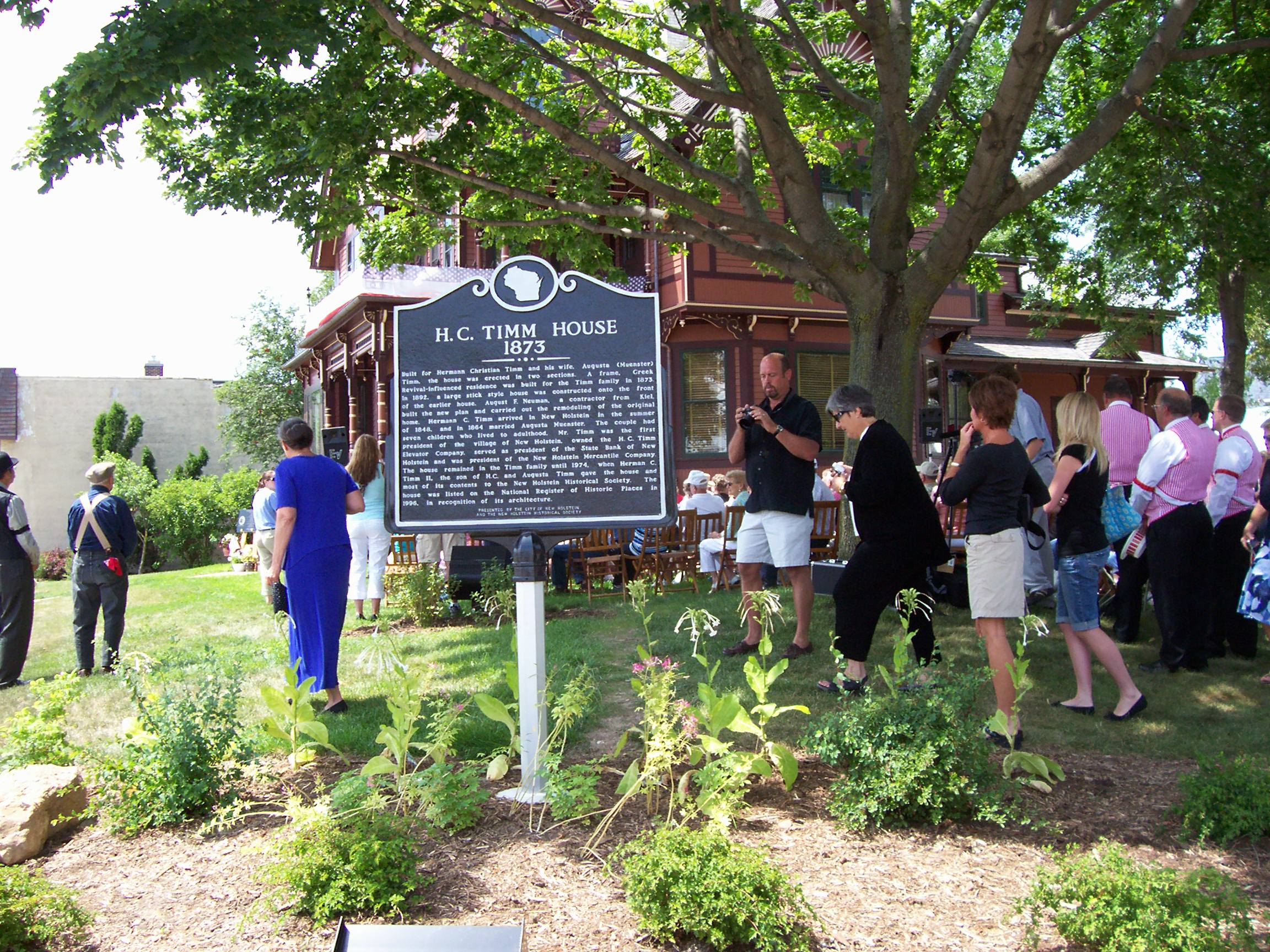
Road sign and rededication crowd

The Herman C. Timm House is a house listed on the National Register of Historic Places in New Holstein, Wisconsin. The house is a significant example of Stick style architecture, a rather rare predecessor of Queen Anne style architecture in the United States. The house was the home of an original settler and prominent citizen, Herman C. Timm.

== Namesake ==
Timm came to New Holstein in 1848 from Marne, Germany, at age 14. He made his money operating a feed mill called Calumet Feeds at the north end of the block the house is on. He started a bank and was the first president of the village.

== History ==
The home was built in 1873 in a Greek Revival style by Kiel contractor August F. Neumann. It consisted of a current upstairs bedroom and first floor kitchen / dining room. The original home became the rear of the home during an addition in 1891. The addition was done in what was later called "stick style" architecture. The stick style was an 1860-1890 trend where carpentry and woodworking technology allowed for much trim detail. Timm's unmarried children took over the home after his death. They turned the upstairs into a rental unit, and in 1954 upstairs and downstairs were both rented out. The home was donated by H. C. Timm II to the New Holstein Historic Society in 1974.

Local volunteers worked on restoring the house. The house's Grand Opening occurred on May 31, 1976, as part of the United States Bicentennial celebration. The New Holstein Historical Museum featured an "Early Photos of New Holstein" exhibit as part of the celebration. The home was added to the National Register of Historic Places in 1996. The society operated the home as a house museum.

== Disasters ==
The house had a major roof leak that forced an end to the house tours in 1998. An architectural assessment was performed on the house and the cost to reconstruct the house was estimated between $116,020 and $126,220. Before the roof was repaired, there was a broken pipe in the dining room. The break happened in January 1999. It dumped 500,000 gallons of water through the first floor and into the basement. The rising basement waters extinguished the furnace, causing the water in the pipes and the radiators to freeze, then burst. City water meters knew there was a problem somewhere in the city, but no one could find the source of the leak. A volunteer at the house discovered the leak. The volunteer arranged for a heating repairman to stop the flooding. When the repairman left, he slammed the door closed. The door frame was so swollen that the volunteer was stuck inside. She had to go upstairs and call for help through a front window.

== Restoration and rededication ==
Only two interior photographs from 1896 exist. The New Holstein Historical Society raised $1.2 million (U.S.D.) for restoration of the Timm House. The Jeffris Foundation of Janesville, Wisconsin, gave the Society a $562,875 grant towards the restoration.

Crown Services from nearby Kiel, Wisconsin, painted the house. It had to start painting in 2007 because winter temperatures came early in 2006. It finished the job by the July 2007 opening. The company nominated the paint job for a national paint award by Zinsser Company, and it was awarded $10,000 and its "Top Job" winner for 2007. The painters had to deal with lead paint, so worker had to have a lead abatement area to lessen lead poisoning. A minimal amount of damaged siding and trim was replaced to maintain the historic nature of the house. When paint was sprayed, it had to be back brushed to keep the hand-painted look. Two coats of chocolate-colored latex paint were applied. The Timm house paint job was featured on the cover of American Painting Contractor's March 2008 issue.

The reconstruction of the house was completed during the summer of 2007, in time for the city's Market Street Days festival. The house was rededicated on July 15, 2007. Congressman Tom Petri and state Senator Joe Leibham spoke at the rededication. The registered historic place plaque was displayed. An information sign was unveiled that is easily visible as motorists turn a corner on Highway 57 / 32. People were able to take tours of the house for the first time in nearly ten years, and the first group to tour included Petri.

== Architecture ==
The house features a tower where he could relax and read newspapers. His wife Augusta sometimes slept on the porch on hot summer days beneath its copper roof. Several windows in the living room and vestibule were made from stained glass.

A 600-gallon water tank was filled in the non-freezing months providing running water for bathing, cleaning and a bathroom. Another amenity that was unusual for the time period was master bedroom on the first floor. The original Quezal Art Glass Company brass chandelier remains in the parlor with its iridescent shades. A lot of the other original furnishings were sold by the family or future tenants so other period pieces were used. Tiny fragments of original wallpaper were found in most rooms during reconstruction and a Swedish company hand-made custom replica wallpaper. The three upstairs bedrooms contain donated historical items like the community's first sewing machine, a bed warmer, and a trunk.

The formal living room ceiling was hand painted and stenciled by Bryan Albert Painting Studio of Wauwatosa. An Arts & Crafts-style chandelier was added to the room when electricity was installed in 1912. The room's hardwood floor was installed diagonally which was expensive at the time. An original Eastlake-style fireplace was brought out of storage during the 1974 reconstruction and two original ceramic dogs were placed on top. Next to the living room is the master bedroom which features a closet which were rare at the time since they were taxed as an additional room.

== See also ==
- National Register of Historic Places listings in Calumet County, Wisconsin
