= New Holstein Municipal Airport =

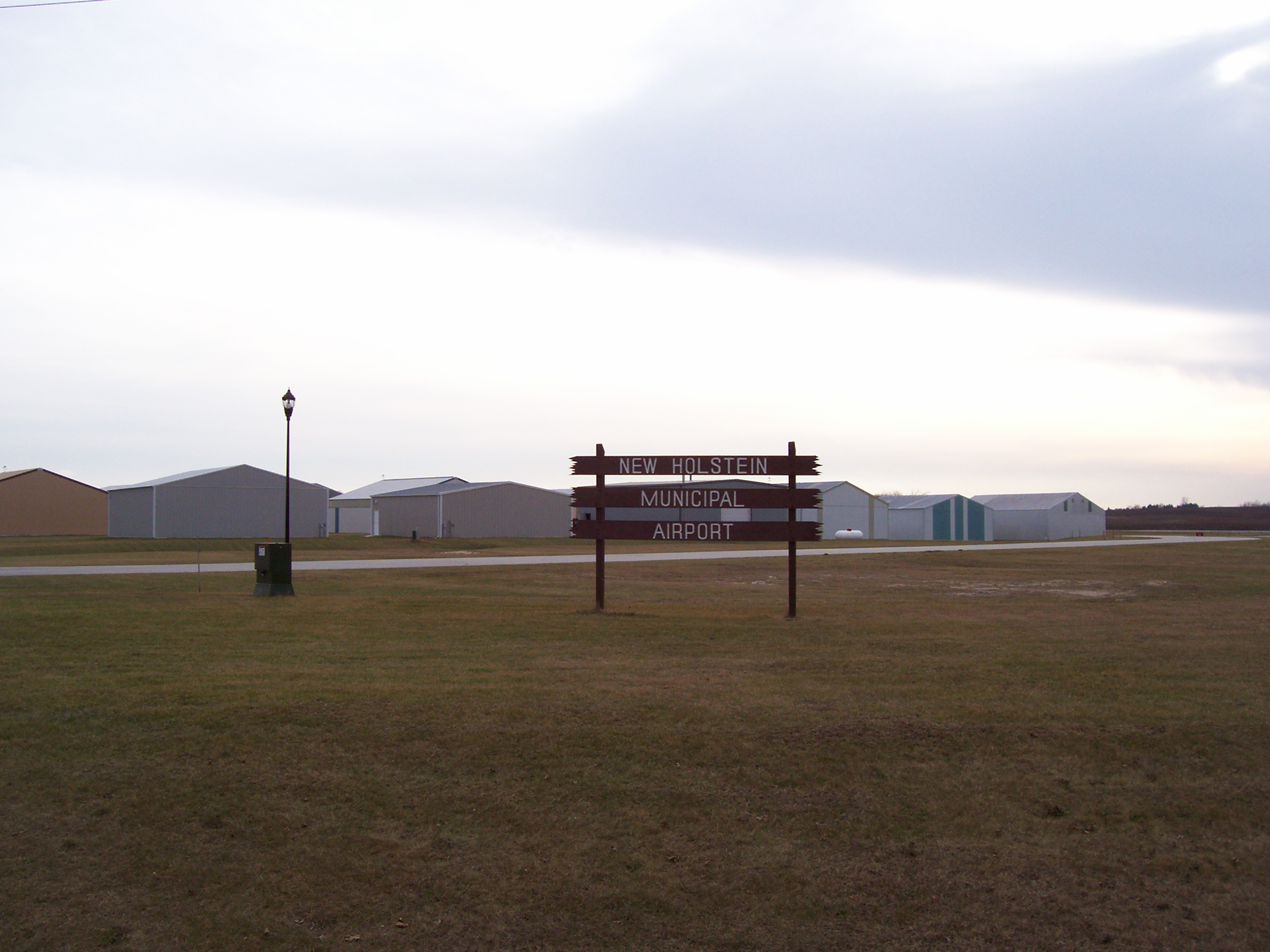
- IATA: none; ICAO: none; FAA LID: 8D1

Summary
- Airport type: Public
- Owner: City of New Holstein
- Serves: New Holstein, Wisconsin
- Opened: September 1958
- Time zone: CST (UTC−06:00)
  - Summer (DST): CDT (UTC−05:00)
- Elevation AMSL: 992 ft / 302 m
- Coordinates: 43°56′39″N 088°06′53″W

Map
- Location of airport in Wisconsin 8D1 (the United States)

Runways
Direction	Length		Surface
Direction	ft	m	Surface
14/32	3,600	1,097	Asphalt
4/22	2,951	899	Turf

Statistics
- Aircraft operations (2023): 7,900
- Based aircraft (2024): 21
- Source: Federal Aviation Administration

New Holstein Municipal Airport (FAA LID: 8D1) is a city-owned public-use airport located one nautical mile (2 km) west of the central business district of New Holstein, a city in Calumet County, Wisconsin, United States. The airport is located on the west edge of the city on County Highway H. It is included in the Federal Aviation Administration (FAA) National Plan of Integrated Airport Systems for 2025–2029, in which it is categorized as a local general aviation facility.

== Facilities and aircraft ==
New Holstein Municipal Airport covers an area of 267 acres (108 ha) at an elevation of 992 feet (302 m) above mean sea level. It has two runways: 14/32 is 3,600 by 75 feet (1,097 x 23 m) with an asphalt surface and 4/22 is 2,951 by 250 feet (899 x 76 m) with a turf surface.

The main runway was paved in 1958.

Welch's Aviation Services is the fixed-base operator.

For the 12-month period ending June 15, 2023, the airport had 7,900 aircraft operations, an average of 22 per day: 94% general aviation, 3% air taxi and 3% military. In July 2024, there were 21 aircraft based at this airport: all 21 single-engine.

The airport was closed while runway 14/32 was reconstructed between August 22, 2017, and November 10, 2017. The runway received new lighting, pavement and a precision approach path indicator guidance system; the project cost $1.65 million.

== See also ==
- List of airports in Wisconsin
