= Gilbert Hipke =

American politician

Gilbert Hipke (July 12, 1898 – September 13, 1977) was a member of the Wisconsin State Assembly.

== Biography ==
Hipke was born on July 12, 1898, in New Holstein, Wisconsin. During World War I, he served as a sergeant in the United States Army. He was a member of the American Legion. On September 14, 1921, Hipke married Brunette Groetzinger. They had three children. He died on September 13, 1977, in Madison, Wisconsin.

== Political career ==
Hipke was elected to the Assembly in 1958 and re-elected in 1960 as a Republican. He had previously been an unsuccessful candidate as an Independent Republican in 1956. Additionally, he was a New Holstein alderman and a member of the Calumet County, Wisconsin Board.
