= Red Bird =

Leader of the Winnebago

- Waanįk Šuuc (Wanig-suchka)
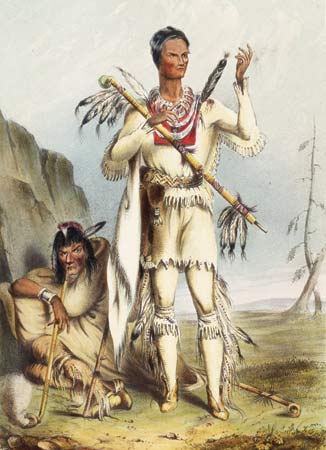
- Red Bird dressed in white buckskin for his surrender to U.S. authorities

Leader of the Winnebago (or Ho-Chunk) leader

Personal details
- Born: c. 1788
- Died: 16 February 1828 (aged roughly 40) Prairie du Chien, Wisconsin
- Known for: Leader in the Winnebago War against the United States

Red Bird (Ho-Chunk: Waanįk Šuuc; c. 1788–16 February 1828) was a leader of the Winnebago (or Ho-Chunk) Native American tribe. He was a leader in the Winnebago War of 1827 against Americans in the United States making intrusions into tribal lands for mining. He was for many years one of the most friendly and trusted of the Wisconsin Native Americans. In the late 1820s Red Bird and his followers began to grow uneasy over the encroachments of lead miners on Ho-Chunk land. The tribe had an uneasy relationship with the dominant culture's legal concepts and often continued to follow tribal practices of justice. This tension resulted in several incidents, including confrontations with Secretary of War, John C. Calhoun. One incident involved the mistaken information channeled to the tribe that two Ho-Chunk executions were conducted at Fort Snelling in 1826 for a murder they did not commit. As white miners continued to extract resources near Winnebago villages on the Rock River, the War Department sought to keep tribes from mining the same minerals, in fear that the land would become contentious. Near Prairie du Chien on June 28, 1827, Red Bird had become increasingly angered by treatment of the tribe. Encroachment on native lands, unfair incarceration, and increasing violence led to escalating tensions. Under pressure from the tribe to defend their interests, Red Bird set off with two others, Chickhonsic (The Little Buffalo) and Wekau (The Sun); eventually meeting a trader, John Lockwood and a former British soldier, Duncan Graham, who advised against violence. Upon arriving at the cabin of Registre Gagnier, the party was met with a friendly welcome and invited in for refreshment. Gagnier, feeling suspicious about the nature of the visit, reached for his rifle, thus setting off the following events. Chickhonsic shot Solomon Lipcap. Wekau attempted to shoot Mrs. Gagnier, but she and her son escaped and gave the alarm in Prairie du Chien.

On June 30, 1827, a band of Ho-Chunk fired on an American keelboat, the Oliver Perry, killing two of the crew and wounding several others. With an Indian war threatening, the militia was mobilized and Federal troops were dispatched to Prairie du Chien from Jefferson Barracks, Missouri. The tribe was generally reluctant to rally to war, despite Red Bird's messages and he and his companions surrendered at Portage on Sept. 2, 1827. Although the chief expected the dignity of being put to death, he was instead taken to Prairie du Chien where he died in prison on Feb. 16, 1828. Several months later the other Indians were pardoned. A dramatic incident in Wisconsin history, the surrender of the proud and handsome chief became the subject of stories, paintings, and plays.

== Notes ==
- "For the story of Red Bird's troubles, see: Snelling (supposed author), Winnebago Outbreak of 1827, Wis. Hist. Colls., V, 143-154. Also: Moses M. Strong, Indian Wars of Wisconsin, Id., VIII, 254-265. Also: Col. Thos. L. McKenny, Winnebago War, Id., V, 178-204. Also: James H. Lockwood, Early Times and Events in Wisconsin, Id., II, 156-168. Also: Ebenezer Childs, Recollections, Id., IV, 172-174."
