= Edward Schildhauer =

American engineer

Edward Schildhauer (August 21, 1872 – May 24, 1953) was a chief electrical and mechanical engineer on the Panama Canal project.

== Early life ==
Edward was born in New Holstein, Wisconsin, the eighth child of German immigrants Joachim and Dorothea (Kuehl) Schildhauer. Edward's father Joachim left Germany in 1852 and visited his family in Brazil. Some people in Brazil told Joachim that Wisconsin was a great place to move to, and Joachim ended up settling in New Holstein.

After being schooled at New Holstein High School, he worked as a helper swinging a 14-pound sledgehammer in 1888. In 1892 he went to Milwaukee to play in an orchestra and worked with covering steam boilers with sheet metal. The job was so hot that worker had to rest every 20 minutes. While resting, he observed a white-collar worker while he operated an electric switchboard and he decided that he wanted to work a less physical job. So in January 1894 he attended college at the University of Wisconsin–Madison. He graduated from college in 1897 with a Bachelor of Science degree in electrical engineering. Edward later obtained a degree in mechanical engineering. He moved to Baltimore doing construction observation. In 1902 Edward married Ruth Burton Crall.

Edward worked at the Commonwealth Edison Co. in Chicago from 1898 to 1906. He worked his way up from a draftsman, then to an assistant electrical engineer, and then to an assistant mechanical engineer. Along the way Edward was credited with several patents including a technique to develop blueprints with arc lights.

== Panama Canal Construction ==
In 1906 he was appointed to the Panama Canal enterprise as a mechanical and electrical engineer and spent nearly a year in Washington D.C. designing plans for the canal. He had to design the canal system from scratch because no other systems of this type had been built at that time. Edward and his wife arrived on the Isthmus of Panama in September 1907 and he was employed on the project until 1914.

He is credited with the complete design of the opening and closing machinery system for the gates on the canal. Schildhauer's system contains 20 foot diameter wheels that are connected by steel arms to 27 hp electric motors that moved the gates on the reduction of gears. He also patented the design for the lock machinery and electrical locomotive system for towing vessels through the locks. Today his equipment can still be seen working beneath the locks, although the lock system is soon to be replaced.

== Later life ==
During World War I Edward was a munitions firm executive. Edward then took part in the design of aircraft from 1919-1924. From 1924 until his retirement in 1931, Edward was the vice president of the Allied Chemical and Dye Corp.

In 1946 Schildhauer became president of the Los Angeles County Republican Assembly and in 1948 he became the treasurer of the California Republican Assembly. He served as a delegate to the 16th district of California for the 1948 national Republican convention. Edward lived in Los Angeles for 17 years.

Edward Schildhauer died at the age of 80 in Los Angeles, California on May 24, 1953. Edward is buried at the New Holstein City Cemetery in New Holstein, Wisconsin.
