= Wisconsin Off Road Series =

Start of a 2006 WORS event

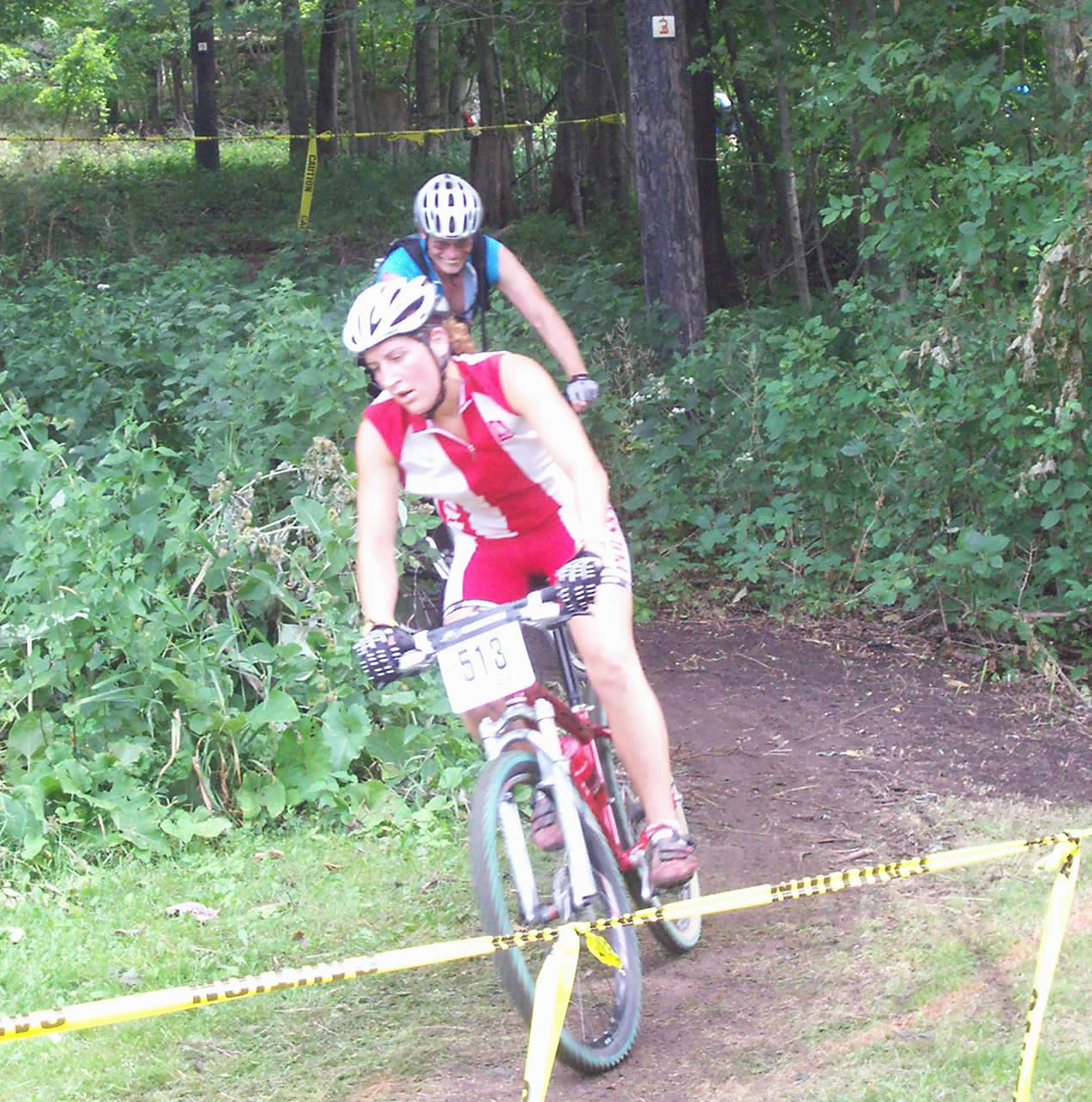
Racing in a variety of terrain

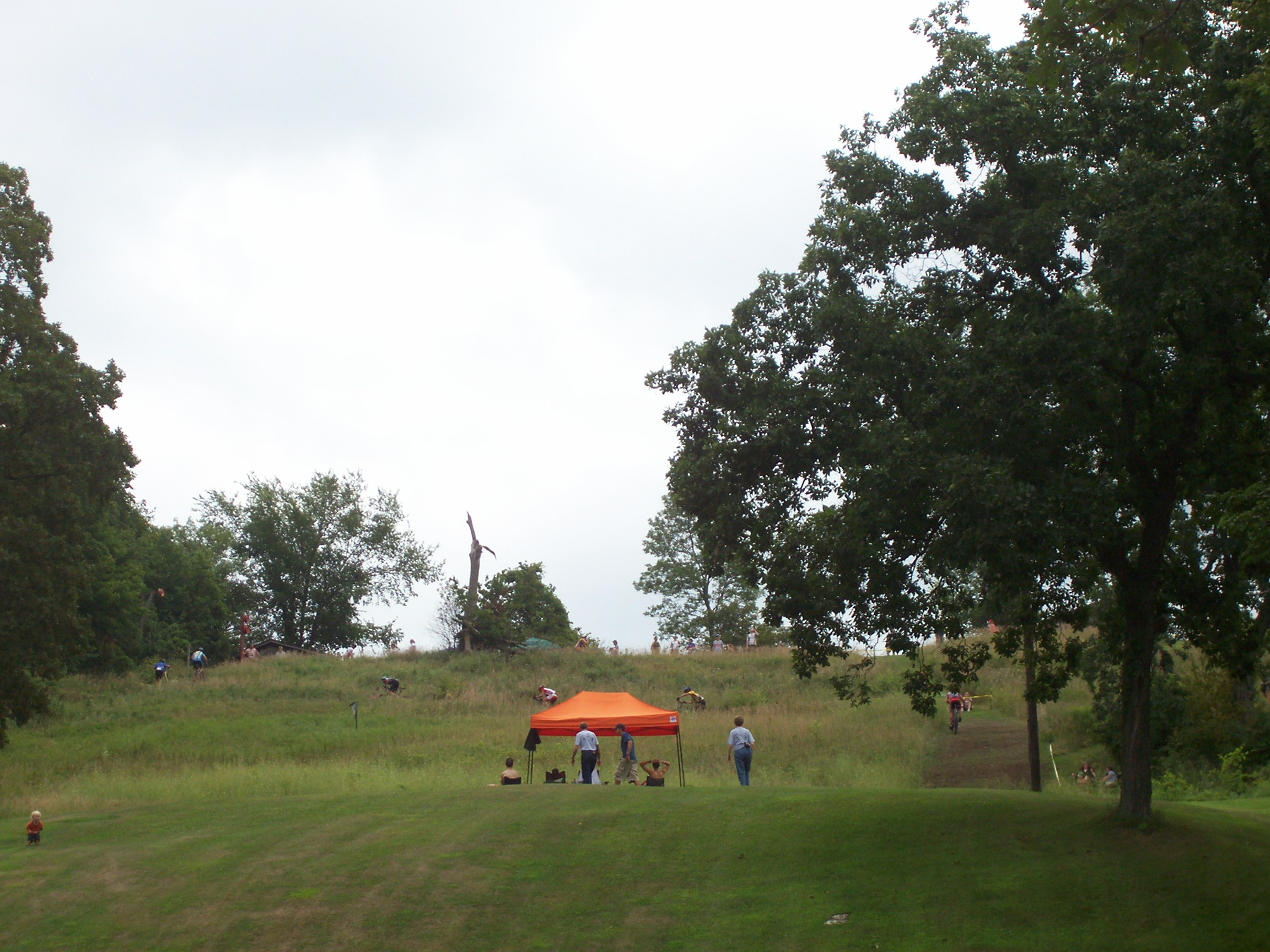
Many events feature hill climbing

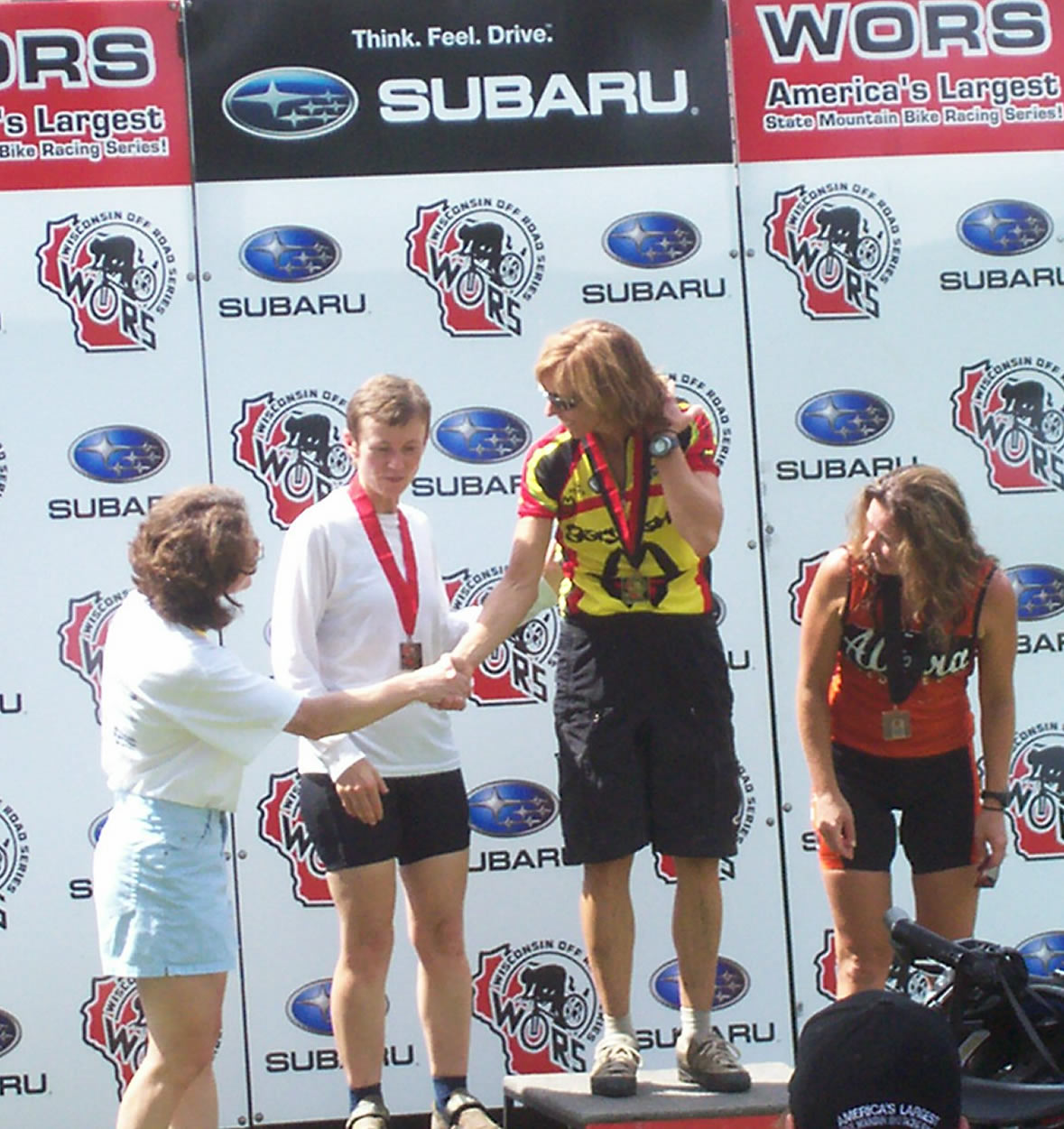
Winners of a 2006 event

The Wisconsin Off Road Series (usually WORS) is an off-road bicycle racing series in Wisconsin, United States. The series is billed as "America's largest state mountain bike racing series."

== History ==
The series began in 1991 as six separate races that were connected by a points system and overall scoring. The series has evolved to a twelve-race season. The series has 17% female participation, which is far above the national average of around 9%.

The series has been sanctioned by the National Off-Road Bicycle Association since 2003, when it averaged over 800 riders per event.

== Classes ==
There are five classes (listed from lowest to highest difficulty level)

- Citizen Youth
- Citizen
- Sport
- Comp
- Elite
