= Calumet County Park Group =

- U.S. National Register of Historic Places
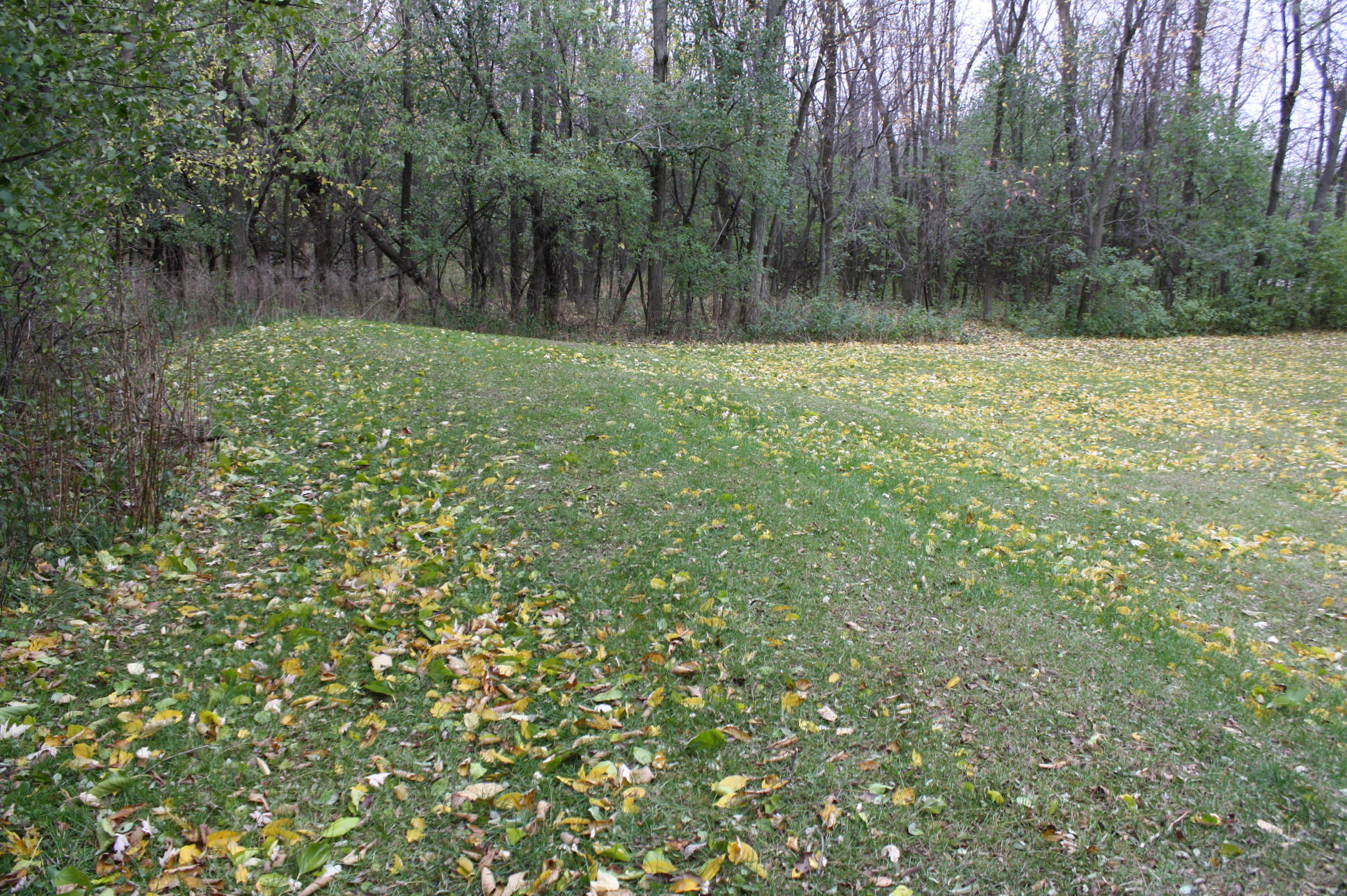
- Location: Address restricted
- Nearest city: Stockbridge, Wisconsin
- NRHP reference No.: 97001551
- Added to NRHP: December 29, 1997

Calumet County Park Group is an archaeological site in Calumet County, Wisconsin, United States. It consists of six effigy mounds of panthers and other water spirits and it is located at the top of the Niagara Escarpment where overlook Lake Winnebago. The group is located within the Calumet County Park approximately 2 miles northwest of Stockbridge. The mounds are consistent with other mound groups found at the peak of the Niagara Escarpment along the eastern shore of Lake Winnebago, including the High Cliff Mounds. It was listed on the National Register of Historic Places in 1997.
