= New Holstein, Wisconsin =

- City
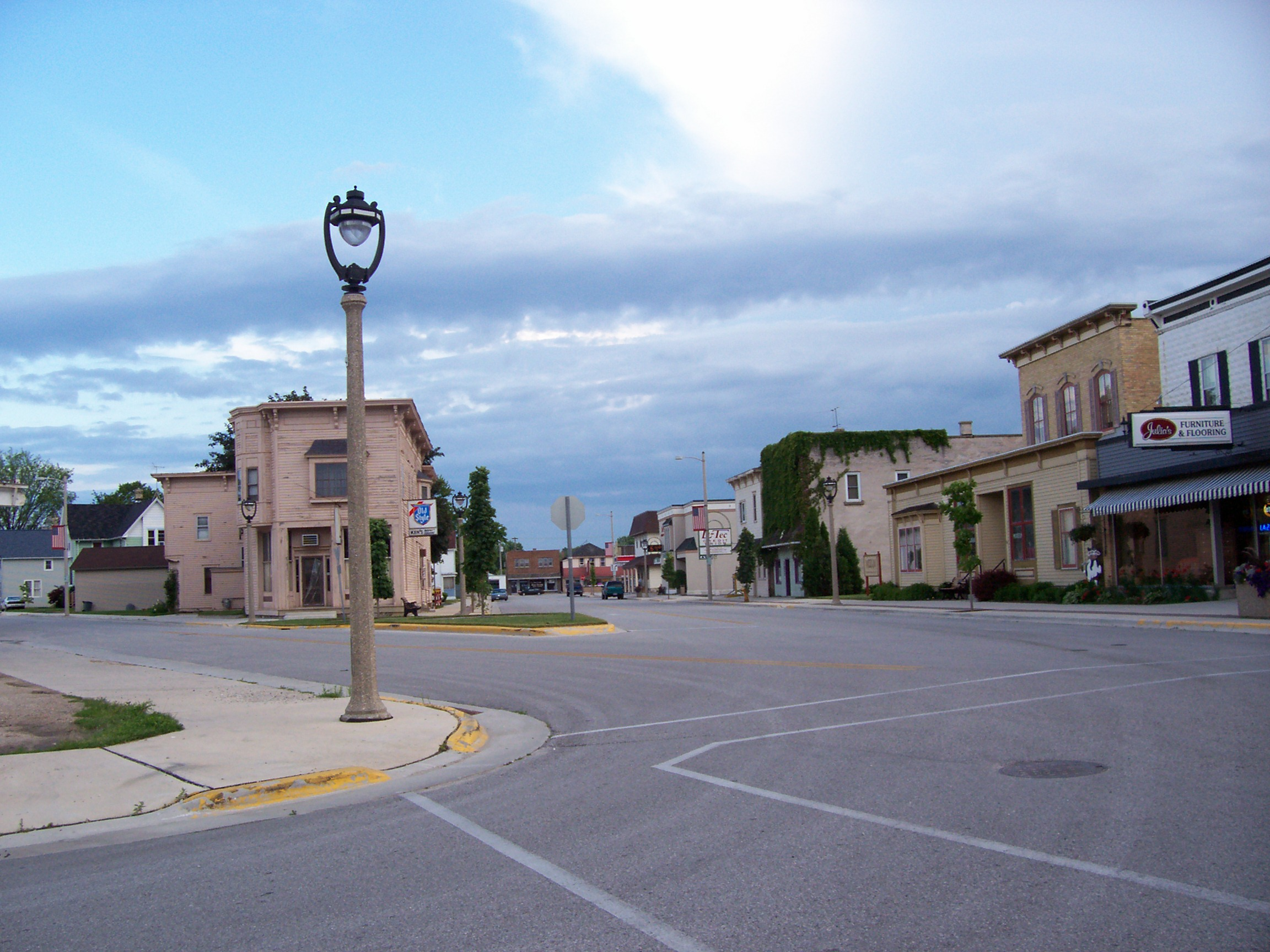
- Main Street in New Holstein

- Location of New Holstein in Calumet County, Wisconsin

- Location within Wisconsin Location within the United States
- Coordinates: 43°56′53″N 88°5′27″W
- Country: United States
- State: Wisconsin
- County: Calumet

Area
  - Total: 2.51 sq mi (6.50 km^{2})
  - Land: 2.51 sq mi (6.49 km^{2})
  - Water: 0.0039 sq mi (0.01 km^{2})
- Elevation: 932 ft (284 m)

Population (2020)
  - Total: 3,195
  - Estimate (2024): 2,891
  - Density: 1,237.0/sq mi (477.61/km^{2})
- Time zone: UTC-6 (Central (CST))
  - Summer (DST): UTC-5 (CDT)
- Area code: 920
- FIPS code: 55-56800
- GNIS feature ID: 1570219
- Website: cityofnewholstein.org

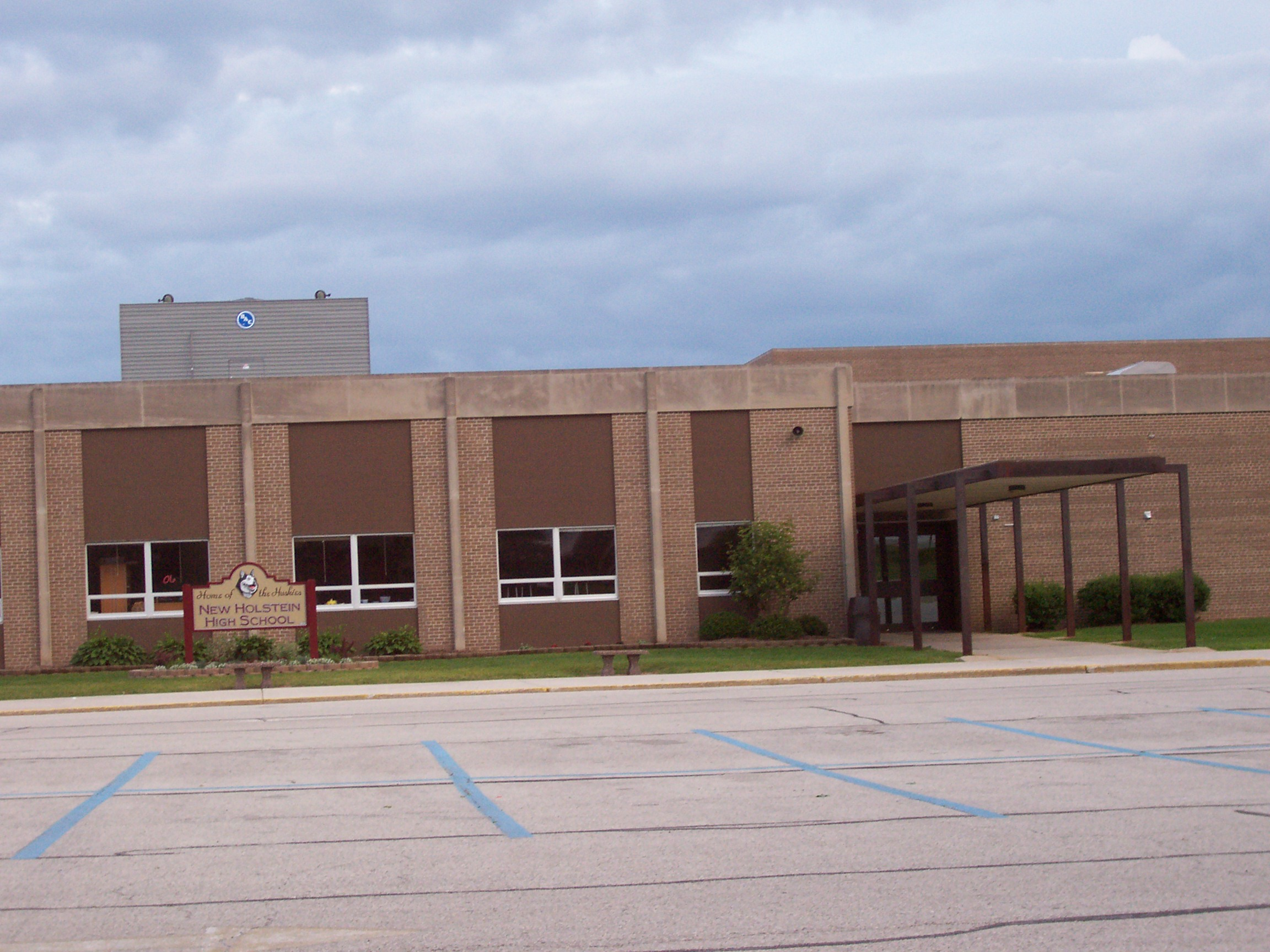
New Holstein High School

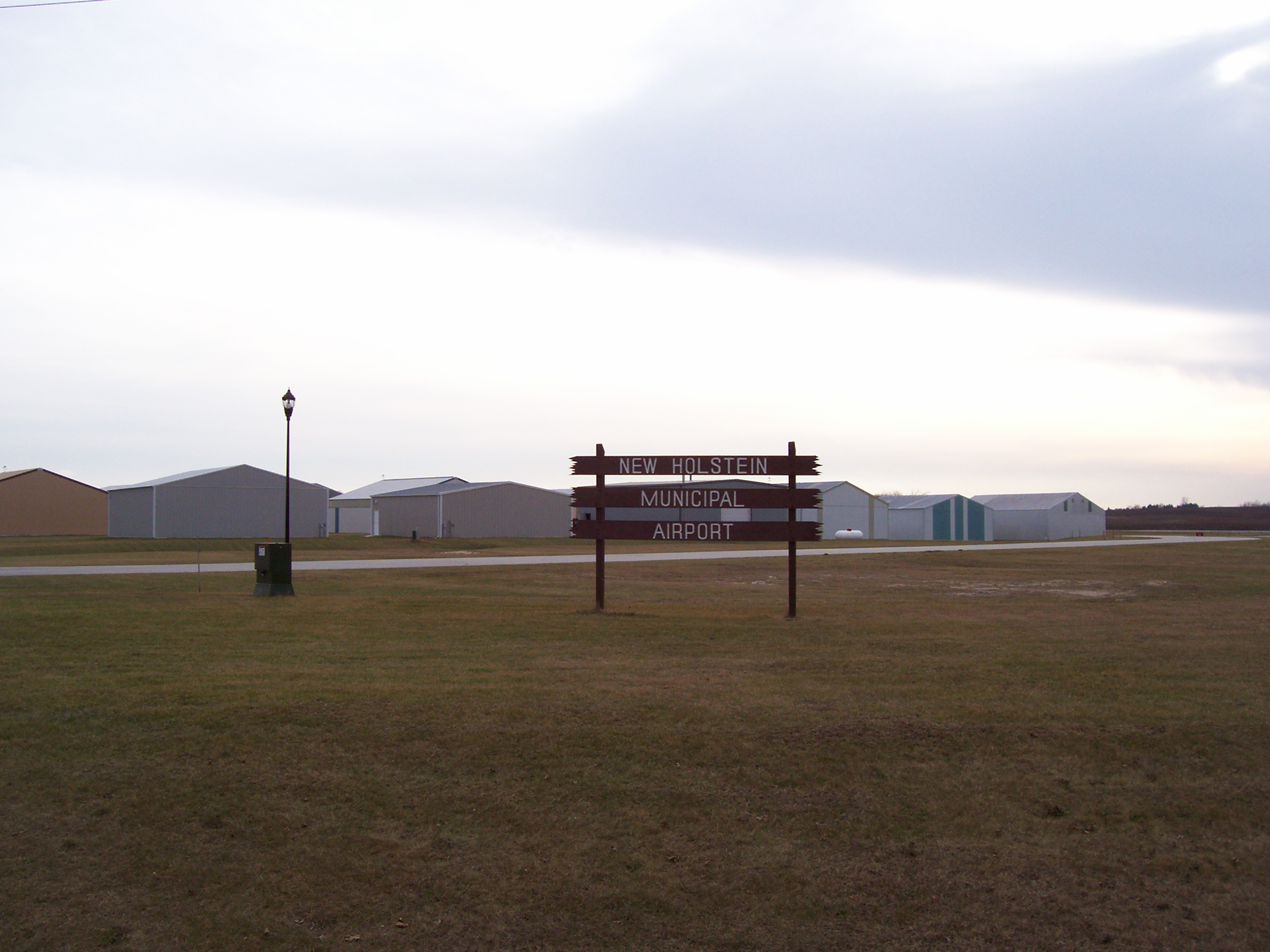
New Holstein Municipal Airport

New Holstein is a city in Calumet County, Wisconsin, United States. The population was 3,098 as of the 2020 census. The city is located within the Town of New Holstein.

== History ==
New Holstein is named after the German duchy of Holstein from which many early settlers emigrated. In 1848, 70 people from Hamburg, Germany emigrated to the New Holstein area, forming the basis of what would become the present city. Many settlers were intellectuals who feared an impending war as a result of competing claims to the territory. Settlers originally named the community Altona after the Altona, the biggest City in Holstein at the time, now Altona, Hamburg, Germany. As the amount of mail received in Altona increased, the United States Post Office wanted Altona to be renamed because the community's name was too close to Altoona in western Wisconsin.

In the early years, settlers traveled for supplies to Calumetville, Wisconsin, a larger neighboring community. Wild game, such as passenger pigeons, was available for food.

The first settlers in the city were Charles Greening and two of his companions. Dr. Charles Bock arrived shortly afterwards. The first postmaster was Monsignor Puchner, a Roman Catholic priest. In 1849 the town was organized, with the first chairman being Greening, who was named county judge in 1855. Settlers continued arriving from Germany throughout the mid-nineteenth century. A drama troupe was organized in 1851.

Railroad service was planned at meetings in 1871. A depot was built and the railroad arrived in 1872. The railroad named the station "New Holstein" after the town. Mail then came to the community on trains instead of via the Pony Express. The first post office was built shortly after rail service started.

By 1881, the community comprised about 400 residents, all of whom were either Germans or of German descent. The village covered over one square mile. That year it had two public halls, three hotels, a fire insurance company, and a cemetery. New Holstein's principal business was a flour mill. Near the railroad depot was a grain elevator owned by Herman Timm.

In 1900 the census reported a population of 569. New Holstein was incorporated as a village the following year. The first lights were installed in the city in 1912.

New Holstein became a city in April 1926. The first city council was: Mayor Edward Funke, City Clerk Harvey C. Hansen, City Council President Peter Hass, Aldermen Gilbert Hipke, Robert Schilling, Louie Schaar, Edgar Lange, W. W. Lauson, Henry Schmitt, and Harry C. Hass, Superintendent of Water Works Henry Aggen, Fire Chief Walter Mathes, Assessor Arthur Roehl, and City Attorney George M. Goggins.

The current mayor is Richard Snelson. The current chief of police is Eric Fisher. The current fire chief is Denis Mayer.

== Geography ==
New Holstein is located at 43°56′53″N 88°5′27″W (43.948185, -88.090931).

According to the United States Census Bureau, the city has a total area of 2.50 square miles (6.47 km^{2}), all of it land.

== Demographics ==
Historical population
Census	Pop.	Note	%±
1890	426		—
1910	839		—
1920	1,373		63.6%
1930	1,274		−7.2%
1940	1,502		17.9%
1950	1,831		21.9%
1960	2,401		31.1%
1970	3,012		25.4%
1980	3,412		13.3%
1990	3,342		−2.1%
2000	3,301		−1.2%
2010	3,236		−2.0%
2020	3,195		−1.3%
2024 (est.)	2,891		−9.5%
U.S. Decennial Census

=== 2010 census ===
As of the census of 2010, there were 3,236 people, 1,394 households, and 887 families residing in the city. The population density was 1,294.4 inhabitants per square mile (499.8/km^{2}). There were 1,520 housing units at an average density of 608.0 per square mile (234.8/km^{2}). The racial makeup of the city was 96.4% White, 0.2% African American, 0.5% Native American, 0.6% Asian, 1.5% from other races, and 0.8% from two or more races. Hispanic or Latino people of any race were 3.2% of the population.

There were 1,394 households, of which 26.2% had children under the age of 18 living with them, 53.2% were married couples living together, 6.6% had a female householder with no husband present, 3.9% had a male householder with no wife present, and 36.4% were non-families. 31.2% of all households were made up of individuals, and 14.7% had someone living alone who was 65 years of age or older. The average household size was 2.25 and the average family size was 2.82.

The median age in the city was 44.7 years. 20.5% of residents were under the age of 18; 7.2% were between the ages of 18 and 24; 22.7% were from 25 to 44; 27.3% were from 45 to 64; and 22.3% were 65 years of age or older. The gender makeup of the city was 50.0% male and 50.0% female.

=== 2000 census ===
As of the census of 2000, there were 3,301 people, 1,329 households, and 886 families residing in the city. The population density was 1,415.9 people per square mile (547.0/km^{2}). There were 1,394 housing units at an average density of 597.9 per square mile (231.0/km^{2}). The racial makeup of the city was 98.49% White, 0.03% Black or African American, 0.24% Native American, 0.24% Asian, 0.09% from other races, and 0.91% from two or more races. 0.58% of the population were Hispanic or Latino of any race.

There were 1,329 households, out of which 29.3% had children under the age of 18 living with them, 55.3% were married couples living together, 8.1% had a female householder with no husband present, and 33.3% were non-families. 29.0% of all households were made up of individuals, and 13.6% had someone living alone who was 65 years of age or older. The average household size was 2.36 and the average family size was 2.88.

In the city, the population was spread out, with 22.7% under the age of 18, 6.5% from 18 to 24, 26.4% from 25 to 44, 23.8% from 45 to 64, and 20.6% who were 65 years of age or older. The median age was 41 years. For every 100 females, there were 92.9 males. For every 100 females age 18 and over, there were 88.7 males.

The median income for a household in the city was $43,180, and the median income for a family was $48,173. Males had a median income of $35,932 versus $23,750 for females. The per capita income for the city was $19,911. About 1.2% of families and 3.0% of the population were below the poverty line, including 2.2% of those under age 18 and 6.2% of those age 65 or over.

== Transportation ==
New Holstein Municipal Airport (8D1) serves the city and surrounding communities.

== Education ==
The city is served by the School District of New Holstein, which includes New Holstein High School, New Holstein Middle School and New Holstein Elementary School.

== Notable people ==
- W. W. Albers, Wisconsin State Senator
- Ken Criter, former National Football League player for the Denver Broncos
- Dan Feyen, Wisconsin State Senator
- Richard J. Greuel, Alaska territorial and state legislator
- Otto Hackbarth, professional golfer
- Hildegarde, cabaret singer
- George H. Hipke, Wisconsin State Senator
- Gilbert Hipke, Wisconsin State Representative
- Alfred A. Laun Jr., Wisconsin State Senator
- Otto Luehrs, Wisconsin State Representative
- Adolph Moeller, Wisconsin State Representative
- Gustave Moeller, painter
- Edward Schildhauer, chief engineer on the Panama Canal project
- Bob Schmitz, former National Football League player. Schmitz played for the Pittsburgh Steelers and the Minnesota Vikings
- Harry Steenbock, biologist
- Wilfrid J. Turba, Wisconsin State Representative

== Landmarks ==
- Herman C. Timm House
