= Wisconsin's Calumet County Assembly district =

Former American legislative district

Wisconsin's Calumet County State Assembly district
- Obsolete
- Notes: 1848–1881; 1888–1972

Wisconsin's Calumet County Assembly district was a district in the Wisconsin State Assembly for most of the history of the state of Wisconsin, up to the legislative redistricting reforms of 1972 which created the current numbered districts. Located in northeast Wisconsin, the district comprised the whole of Calumet County, Wisconsin, and was one of the 66 original Assembly districts defined in Article XIV of the Constitution of Wisconsin.

The district was in use for 117 of the first 124 years of Wisconsin's history, from 1848 to 1881, and then again from 1888 until 1972.

== List of representatives ==
List of representatives from the Calumet County district
Member	Party	Residence	Term start	Term end	Leg.
District created
Lemuel Goodell	Dem.	Stockbridge	June 5, 1848	January 1, 1849	1st
Alonzo D. Dick	Whig	Manchester	January 1, 1849	January 7, 1850	2nd
David E. Wood	Whig	Manchester	January 7, 1850	January 6, 1851	3rd
William H. Dick	Dem.	Brothertown	January 6, 1851	January 5, 1852	4th
James Cramond	Dem.	Manchester	January 5, 1852	January 3, 1853	5th
James Robinson	Dem.	Chilton	January 3, 1853	January 2, 1854	6th
Alexander H. Hart	Dem.	Lima	January 2, 1854	January 1, 1855	7th
Almond Merrill	Rep.	Charlestown	January 1, 1855	January 7, 1856	8th
James Cramond	Dem.	Manchester	January 7, 1856	January 5, 1857	9th
George A. Jenkins	Rep.	Charlestown	January 5, 1857	January 4, 1858	10th
James Robinson	Dem.	Chilton	January 4, 1858	January 3, 1859	11th
Harrison Carroll Hobart	Dem.	Chilton	January 3, 1859	January 2, 1860	12th
Asaph Green	Dem.	Chilton	January 2, 1860	January 7, 1861	13th
Le Roy Graves	Rep.	Gravesville	January 7, 1861	January 6, 1862	14th
William Frisbie Watrous	Dem.	Charlestown	January 6, 1862	January 5, 1863	15th
James Robinson	Dem.	Chilton	January 5, 1863	January 4, 1864	16th
Thomas McLean	Dem.	Stockbridge	January 4, 1864	January 2, 1865	17th
Hector McLean	Dem.	Stockbridge	January 2, 1865	January 1, 1866	18th
George Baldwin	Dem.	Chilton	January 1, 1866	January 7, 1867	19th
Randolph J. Needham	Rep.	Stockbridge	January 7, 1867	January 6, 1868	20th
Casper H. M. Petersen	Dem.	New Holstein	January 6, 1868	January 3, 1870	21st 22nd
James Robinson	Dem.	Chilton	January 3, 1870	January 2, 1871	23rd
William H. Dick	Dem.	Brothertown	January 2, 1871	January 1, 1872	24th
Casper H. M. Petersen	Dem.	New Holstein	January 1, 1872	January 6, 1873	25th
Thomas Lynch	Dem.	Chilton	January 6, 1873	January 5, 1874	26th
Benjamin F. Carter	Dem.	Harrison	January 5, 1874	January 4, 1875	27th
John Harsh	Rep.	Stockbridge	January 4, 1875	January 3, 1876	28th
Henry Horst	Dem.	Hayton	January 3, 1876	January 1, 1877	29th
Benjamin F. Carter	Dem.	Harrison	January 1, 1877	January 7, 1878	30th
J. Hayward Haight	Gbk.	Brothertown	January 7, 1878	January 6, 1879	31st
Joseph B. Reynolds	Gbk.	Chilton	January 6, 1879	January 5, 1880	32nd
James Parkinson	Dem.	Brothertown	January 5, 1880	January 3, 1881	33rd
Casper H. M. Petersen	Dem.	New Holstein	January 3, 1881	January 2, 1882	34th
Adolph Moeller	Rep.	New Holstein	January 2, 1882	January 1, 1883	35th
District abolished by 1882 Wisconsin Act 242; Calumet County divided into the Calumet–Outagamie 3rd and Calumet–Outagamie 4th districts
District re-established by 1887 Wisconsin Act 461
William V. McMullen	Dem.	Brillion	January 7, 1889	January 2, 1893	39th 40th
James Parkinson	Dem.	Brothertown	January 2, 1893	January 7, 1895	41st
Joseph Wolfinger	Dem.	Woodville	January 7, 1895	January 2, 1899	42nd 43rd
Jeremiah Wallace Baldock	Rep.	Chilton	January 2, 1899	January 7, 1901	44th
Isaac N. McComb	Dem.	Brillion	January 7, 1901	January 5, 1903	45th
Lewis Rupp	Dem.		January 5, 1903	January 2, 1905	46th
Daniel R. Curtin	Rep.	Woodville	January 2, 1905	January 7, 1907	47th
Henry Rollmann	Dem.	Chilton	January 7, 1907	January 2, 1911	48th 49th
Lewis Rupp	Dem.	Charlestown	January 2, 1911	January 6, 1913	50th
August T. Dorn	Dem.	Harrison	January 6, 1913	January 4, 1915	51st
Henry W. Hoffman	Dem.	Stockbridge	January 4, 1915	January 1, 1917	52nd
Otto Luehrs	Rep.	Charlestown	January 1, 1917	January 6, 1919	53rd
Otto Lerche	Soc.	Rantoul	January 6, 1919	January 3, 1921	54th
George J. Schwalbach	Dem.	Harrison	January 3, 1921	January 1, 1923	55th
Carl Hillmann	Rep.	Rantoul; Brillion	January 1, 1923	January 7, 1929	56th 57th 58th
Charles A. Barnard	Rep.	Brillion	January 7, 1929	January 5, 1931	59th
Jerome F. Fox	Dem.	Chilton	January 5, 1931	January 7, 1935	60th 61st
John W. Short	Dem.	Chilton	January 7, 1935	January 4, 1937	62nd
Henry W. Hupfauf	Dem.	Harrison	January 4, 1937	January 2, 1939	63rd
Carl J. Peik	Prog.	Chilton	January 2, 1939	January 6, 1941	64th
Charles R. Barnard	Rep.	Brillion	January 6, 1941	January 3, 1949	65th 66th 67th 68th
Henry M. Peters	Rep.	Menasha	January 3, 1949	January 5, 1959	69th 70th 71st 72nd 73rd
Gilbert Hipke	Rep.	New Holstein	January 5, 1959	January 7, 1963	74th 75th
Wilmer H. Struebing	Rep.	Brillion	January 7, 1963	January 2, 1967	76th 77th
Gervase Hephner	Dem.	Chilton	January 2, 1967	January 1, 1973	78th 79th 80th
District abolished by 1971 Wisconsin Act 304; Calumet County became part of the 6th Assembly district
