= Thomas Lynch (Wisconsin politician) =

American lawyer and politician (1844–1898)

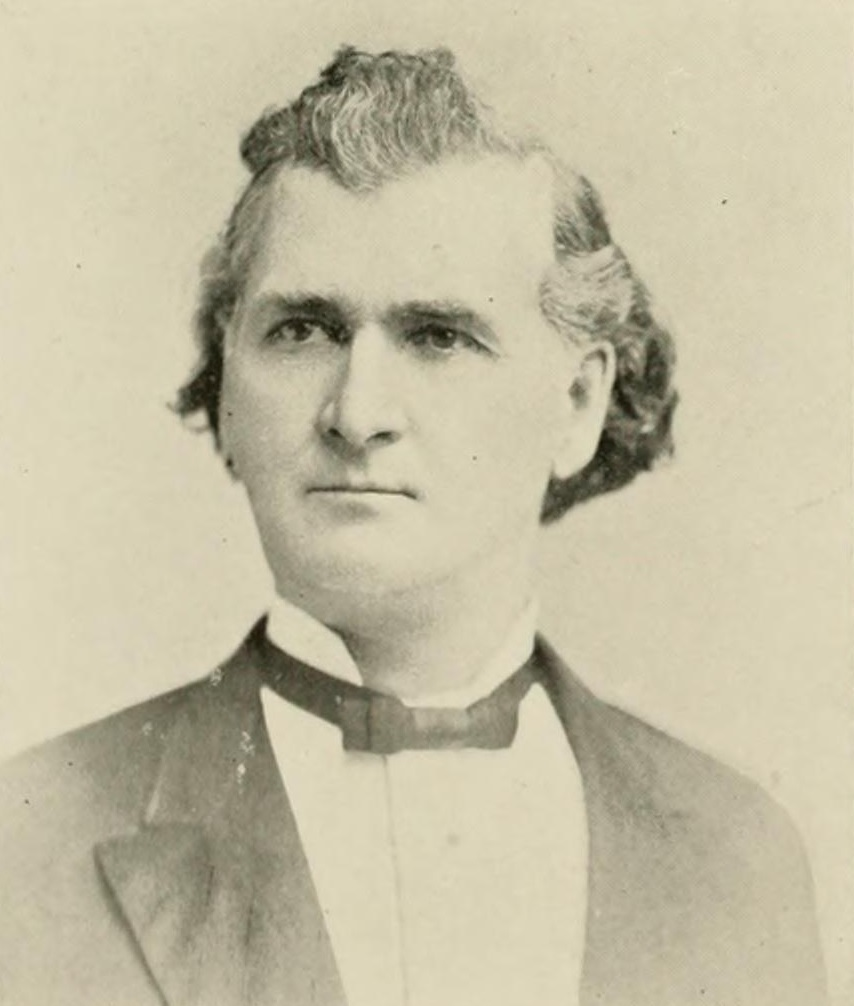
- From History of Langlade County, Wisconsin (1922)

Member of the U.S. House of Representatives from Wisconsin's 9th district
- In office March 4, 1891 – March 3, 1895
- Preceded by: Myron H. McCord
- Succeeded by: Alexander Stewart

1st & 4th Mayor of Antigo, Wisconsin
- In office April 1888 – April 1889
- Preceded by: Daniel W. Keen
- Succeeded by: J. F. Doyle
- In office April 1885 – April 1886
- Preceded by: Position established
- Succeeded by: Munson M. Ross

Member of the Wisconsin State Assembly from the Calumet district
- In office January 1, 1883 – January 5, 1885
- Preceded by: Adolph Moeller
- Succeeded by: Leopold Strasser
- In office January 6, 1873 – January 5, 1874
- Preceded by: Casper Petersen
- Succeeded by: Benjamin F. Carter

District Attorney of Calumet County, Wisconsin
- In office January 6, 1879 – January 1, 1883
- Preceded by: John E. McMullen
- Succeeded by: A. A. Hugent

Personal details
- Born: November 21, 1844 Granville, Wisconsin Territory
- Died: May 4, 1898 (aged 53) Pelican Lake, Wisconsin, U.S.
- Resting place: Queen of Peace Catholic Cemetery, Antigo, Wisconsin
- Party: Democratic
- Spouse: Winnifred Finucane (m. 1867–1898)
- Children: at least 10; 7 died in childhood
- Education: University of Wisconsin Law School
- Profession: Lawyer

Other notable people share this name. See Thomas Lynch (disambiguation).

Thomas Lynch (November 21, 1844 – May 4, 1898) was an American lawyer and Democratic politician from the U.S. state of Wisconsin. He served two terms in the United States House of Representatives, representing Wisconsin's 9th congressional district. He was also the first mayor of Antigo, Wisconsin, and served two terms in the Wisconsin State Assembly.

== Biography ==
Thomas Lynch was born on November 21, 1844, in the town of Granville, Milwaukee County, in the Wisconsin Territory. He was educated in the common schools in Milwaukee County, then moved to the town of Chilton, Wisconsin, in Calumet County, in 1864, and purchased a farm.

In the Spring of 1867 he was elected to the town board of supervisor—winning his election by just 1 vote. The next year he was elected chairman of the town board; he was then re-elected in that office in 1869 and 1870. In 1871, he began teaching school while studying law.

In 1872, he was elected to his first term in the Wisconsin State Assembly, representing all of Calumet County. He was elected running as an Independent candidate, but caucused as a Democrat after joining the 26th Wisconsin Legislature.

After the legislative session, in the spring of 1873, he was elected chairman of both his town board and the Calumet County board of supervisors. In 1874, he attended the University of Wisconsin Law School in Madison, Wisconsin, to complete his legal education. He graduated the following year and was admitted to the bar. He immediately returned to Calumet County and formed a law partnership with Calumet's incumbent district attorney John E. McMullen, known as McMullen & Lynch. In 1878 he was elected as successor to McMillan as district attorney, and served two terms.

In 1882, rather than running for another term as district attorney, he ran for election to the Assembly, and was elected to serve in the 36th Wisconsin Legislature.

After the end of the 1883 legislative session, he moved north to Antigo, Wisconsin, in Langlade County. When Antigo was incorporated as a city, Lynch was elected the first mayor. He was subsequently elected to another term as mayor in 1888.

In 1890, he was chosen as the Democratic Party nominee for United States House of Representatives in Wisconsin's 9th congressional district, which then comprised nearly all of northern Wisconsin—Ashland, Chippewa, Door, Florence, Forest, Langlade, Lincoln, Marathon, Marinette, Oconto, Oneida, Portage, Price, Sawyer, Shawano, Taylor, Waupaca, and Wood counties. At the general election, he defeated incumbent Republican congressman Myron H. McCord. He went on to win re-election in 1892 and served in the Fifty-second and Fifty-third Congresses (March 4, 1891 – March 3, 1895). He was defeated in 1894, running for a third term.

Lynch resumed his legal practice, but suffered from Bright's disease. In May 1898, he died of the disease at his summer home in Pelican Lake, Wisconsin.

== Personal life and family ==
Thomas Lynch married Winnifred Finucane on November 2, 1867. They had at least 10 children, though at least seven of those died in childhood. They were members of the Catholic Church. It's not clear if any of his children survived him.

== Electoral history ==
=== Wisconsin Assembly (1872) ===
Wisconsin Assembly, Calumet District Election, 1872
Party	Candidate	Votes	%	±%
General Election, November 5, 1872
Independent Democrat	Thomas Lynch	1,065	51.01%	
Republican	Samuel C. Beach	915	43.82%	−5.46%
Democratic	Hector McLean	108	5.17%	−45.55%
Plurality		150	7.18%	+5.74%
Total votes		2,088	100.0%	+20.35%
Democratic hold				

=== Wisconsin Assembly (1882) ===
Wisconsin Assembly, Calumet District Election, 1882
Party	Candidate	Votes	%	±%
General Election, November 7, 1882
Democratic	Thomas Lynch	1,029	53.26%	+9.91%
Republican	G. D. Breed	522	27.02%	−19.54%
Greenback	J. W. Baldock	259	13.41%	+3.32%
Prohibition	C. W. Thurston	122	6.31%	
Plurality		507	26.24%	+23.03%
Total votes		1,932	100.0%	-0.05%
Democratic gain from Republican				

=== U.S. House of Representatives (1890, 1892, 1894) ===
Year	Date	Elected				Defeated				Total	Plurality
1890	Nov. 4	Thomas Lynch	Democratic	24,491	54.45%	Myron H. McCord (inc)	Rep.	19,161	42.60%	44,980	5,330
1890	Nov. 4	Thomas Lynch	Democratic	24,491	54.45%	J. H. Vrooman	Proh.	1,290	2.87%	44,980	5,330
1890	Nov. 4	Thomas Lynch	Democratic	24,491	54.45%	George W. Peck (write-in)	Dem.	25	0.06%	44,980	5,330
1892	Nov. 8	Thomas Lynch (inc)	Democratic	19,608	52.18%	Myron H. McCord	Rep.	16,519	43.96%	37,576	3,089
1892	Nov. 8	Thomas Lynch (inc)	Democratic	19,608	52.18%	Adolph D. Pergoli	Peo.	1,423	3.79%	37,576	3,089
1892	Nov. 8	Thomas Lynch (inc)	Democratic	19,608	52.18%	William D. Badger	Proh.	26	0.07%	37,576	3,089
1894	Nov. 6	Alexander Stewart	Republican	22,741	55.98%	Thomas Lynch (inc)	Dem.	14,910	36.70%	40,623	7,831
1894	Nov. 6	Alexander Stewart	Republican	22,741	55.98%	John F. Miles	Peo.	2,187	5.38%	40,623	7,831
1894	Nov. 6	Alexander Stewart	Republican	22,741	55.98%	John J. Sherman	Proh.	785	1.93%	40,623	7,831

Wisconsin State Assembly
Preceded by Casper Petersen	Member of the Wisconsin State Assembly from the Calumet district January 6, 1873 – January 5, 1874	Succeeded by Benjamin F. Carter
Preceded by Adolph Moeller	Member of the Wisconsin State Assembly from the Calumet district January 6, 1, 1883 – January 5, 1885	Succeeded by Leopold Strasser
U.S. House of Representatives
Preceded by Myron H. McCord	Member of the U.S. House of Representatives from Wisconsin's 9th congressional district March 4, 1891 - March 3, 1895	Succeeded by Alexander Stewart
Political offices
New city incorporated	Mayor of Antigo, Wisconsin; April 1885 – April 1886	Succeeded by Munson M. Ross
Preceded by Daniel W. Keen	Mayor of Antigo, Wisconsin; April 1888 – April 1889	Succeeded by J. F. Doyle
Legal offices
Preceded by John E. McMullen	District Attorney of Calumet County, Wisconsin; January 6, 1879 – January 1, 1883	Succeeded by A. A. Hugent
