= Darboy =

Darboy may refer to

- Darboy, Wisconsin, an unincorporated community
- Georges Darboy (1813–1871) French Catholic priest, archbishop of Paris
