= Casper Petersen =

19th century American politician

Casper H. M. Petersen

Member of the Wisconsin State Assembly from the Calumet district
- In office January 3, 1881 – January 2, 1882
- Preceded by: James W. Parkinson
- Succeeded by: Adolph Moeller
- In office January 1, 1872 – January 6, 1873
- Preceded by: William H. Dick
- Succeeded by: Thomas Lynch
- In office January 6, 1868 – January 3, 1870
- Preceded by: Randolph J. Needham
- Succeeded by: James Robinson

Personal details
- Born: March 14, 1826 Jagel, Schleswig, Denmark
- Died: July 16, 1906 (aged 80) Plymouth, Wisconsin, U.S.
- Resting place: New Holstein City Cemetery, New Holstein, Wisconsin
- Party: Democratic; National Democratic (1896)
- Spouses: first wife (died 1856); Auguste Johanna Bodenstab (m. 1859–1906)
- Children: with first wife; Amelia (Hajenga)^{(b. 1853; died 1918)}; Mary (Bruns)^{(b. 1856; died 1932)}; with Auguste Bodenstab; Fred J. Petersen^{(b. 1863; died 1913)}; four others

Military service
- Allegiance: Schleswig-Holstein
- Years of service: 1848–1851
- Battles/wars: First Schleswig War

Casper H. M. Petersen (often spelled Peterson) (March 14, 1826 – July 16, 1906) was an American schoolteacher, businessman and farmer from New Holstein, Wisconsin, who spent four non-consecutive terms as a Democratic member of the Wisconsin State Assembly from Calumet County, Wisconsin.

== Background ==
Peterson was born in Mielberg (a hamlet southwest of Jagel), in the Duchy of Schleswig, on March 14, 1826; was educated at the Teachers' Seminary at Tondern, Schleswig, and worked as a schoolteacher for five years. Peterson joined the military service of Schleswig-Holstein from 1848 to 1851, participating in the First Schleswig War against Denmark.

He came to the United States in 1851, and first settled in Milwaukee, where he was a teacher and organist in the first Lutheran school of that city. He moved to Chicago in 1852 and worked as a clerk; and to Racine in 1855, where he tried his hand as a merchant; and to New Holstein in 1861, where he became a farmer. He was chairman of the town for a member of years and president of the Calumet County Mutual Fire Insurance Co.

== Legislative service ==
Peterson was first a member of the assembly from Calumet County in 1868 (succeeding Randolph Needham of the National Union (Republican) party) and was assigned to the standing committee on roads, bridges and ferries. He was re-elected for the 1869 session, and switched to the committees on the assessment and collection of taxes, and on legislative expenditures

He was not a candidate for re-election, and was succeeded by fellow Democrat and former Assemblyman James Robinson. He was elected again in 1872, succeeding Democrat William Dick, with 880 votes to 855 for Republican John Merrill, and was assigned to the committee on lumber and manufacturing. He was not a candidate for re-election, and the seat was taken by independent candidate Thomas Lynch (who became a Democrat after the election, and would later become a Congressman).

He was once more elected assemblyman in 1880 for a two-year term, receiving 2,037 votes against 1,015 votes for C. W. Thurston (Rep.), and 121 votes for Greenback J. Hayward Haight, who had formerly held the seat (the incumbent, Democrat J. W. Parkinson, was not a candidate). He was assigned to the standing committee on ways and means. He was not a candidate for re-election in 1882, and was succeeded by Republican Adolph Moeller, a fellow Schleswig-Holstein veteran of the First Schleswig War against Denmark. He ran as a candidate for the National Democratic Party in 1896.

== Personal life ==
He moved to Plymouth, Wisconsin in 1892. During the first four or five years of his residence there he was secretary and treasurer of the Schwartz Mfg. Co., after which he retired.

Petersen married for the first time in Schleswig. His first wife died in 1854; from this union two daughters survived. In 1859, while living in Racine, he married Auguste Bodenstab. He died at home on July 16, 1906 after a few weeks' illness, the second wife survived him, along with three sons of that marriage (two daughters had died in infancy). He was buried in the New Holstein City Cemetery.
