= George A. Jenkins =

19th century American politician

Member of the Wisconsin Senate from the 19th district
- In office January 6, 1862 – January 5, 1863
- Preceded by: Benjamin Sweet
- Succeeded by: Joseph Vilas

Member of the Wisconsin State Assembly from the Calumet County district
- In office January 5, 1857 – January 4, 1858
- Preceded by: James Cramond
- Succeeded by: James Robinson

Personal details
- Born: May 19, 1818 Jefferson County, New York, U.S.
- Died: April 27, 1896 (aged 77) Fort Atkinson, Wisconsin, U.S.
- Resting place: Evergreen Cemetery, Fort Atkinson
- Party: Republican
- Spouses: Rachel Battchellor (died 1850); Rachel Marina Wood (before 1896)
- Children: with Rachel Battchellor; Lydia Orinda Jenkins^{(b. 1844; died 1900)}; Agnes O. Jenkins^{(b. 1846; died 1915)}; Emma J. (Alling) (Curtis)^{(b. 1848; died 1906)}; Nina E. Jenkins^{(b. 1850; died 1923)}; with Rachel Wood; Arthur Hartley Jenkins^{(b. 1854; died 1883)}
- Occupation: Farmer

George Averill Jenkins (May 19, 1818 – April 27, 1896) was an American farmer, Republican politician, and Wisconsin pioneer. He served one year in each house of the Wisconsin Legislature, representing Calumet County in the Wisconsin State Assembly in 1857 and the State Senate in 1862. His name was sometimes abbreviated G. A. Jenkins.

== Biography ==
George A. Jenkins was born in Jefferson County, New York, in May 1818. He came to Wisconsin in the 1850s and settled initially in the town of Charlestown, Wisconsin, in Calumet County.

He became active in politics with the Republican Party, and in 1856 he received the Republican nomination for Wisconsin State Assembly in Calumet County. He defeated his Democratic opponent in the general election and went on to serve in the 1857 session. In 1858 and 1859, he served as chairman of the town of Charlestown and was an ex officio member of the county board of supervisors.

In the first year of the American Civil War, 1861, incumbent state senator Benjamin Sweet resigned his office in order to join the Union Army. This created the need for a special election to fill the remaining year of his term. Jenkins was elected in November 1861, running on the Republican Party ticket, and served in the Senate for the 1862 session, representing the 19th Senate district. The district then comprised all of Calumet County and neighboring Manitowoc County. He defeated Democratic candidate Joseph Vilas of Manitowoc. After his term in the Legislature, Jenkins was appointed draft commissioner for Calumet County to supervise conscription for the Union Army in that county.

In the late 1860s, Jenkins moved to Koshkonong, Wisconsin, in Jefferson County. In Jefferson County, he became involved with the Prohibition Party. He ran for State Assembly in Jefferson County's 2nd Assembly district in 1884, but came in a distant third behind the regular Democratic and Republican candidates.

He died at the nearby city of Fort Atkinson, Wisconsin, on April 27, 1896.

== Personal life and family ==
George A. Jenkins was the 5th of seven children born to George Jenkins and his wife Parthenia (née Wood).

George A. Jenkins married twice. With his first wife, Rachel Battchellor, he had four daughters. After her death in 1850, he married his first cousin, Rachel Marina Wood, and had a son.

Jenkins kept extensive diaries for the last forty years of his life, including temperature readings three times per day. His diaries were donated to the Wisconsin Historical Society after his death.

== Electoral history ==
=== Wisconsin Assembly (1884) ===
Wisconsin Assembly, Jefferson 2nd District Election, 1884
Party	Candidate	Votes	%	±%
General Election, November 4, 1884
Democratic	Samuel A. Craig (incumbent)	2,025	49.52%	−4.67%
Republican	John Whittet	1,873	45.81%	
Prohibition	G. A. Jenkins	191	4.67%	
Plurality		152	3.72%	-4.68%
Total votes		4,089	100.0%	+34.07%
Democratic hold				

Wisconsin State Assembly
Preceded by James Cramond	Member of the Wisconsin State Assembly from the Calumet County district January 5, 1857 – January 4, 1858	Succeeded by James Robinson
Wisconsin Senate
Preceded by Benjamin Sweet	Member of the Wisconsin Senate from the 19th district January 6, 1862 – January 5, 1863	Succeeded by Joseph Vilas
