= James Parkinson (Wisconsin politician) =

American politician (1829–1897)

J. W. Parkinson

Member of the Wisconsin State Assembly from the Calumet district
- In office January 2, 1893 – January 7, 1895
- Preceded by: William V. McMullen
- Succeeded by: Joseph Wolfinger
- In office January 5, 1880 – January 3, 1881
- Preceded by: Joseph B. Reynolds
- Succeeded by: Casper Petersen

Personal details
- Born: September 10, 1829 La Fargeville, New York, U.S.
- Died: January 28, 1897 (aged 67) Brothertown, Wisconsin, U.S.
- Resting place: Saint Paul's United Church of Christ Cemetery, Pipe, Wisconsin
- Party: Democratic
- Spouses: Adaline Wadsworth (died 1861); Mary J. Knickerbocker (died 1866); Sarah E. Knickerbocker (m. 1867; died 1877); Amelia Simpich (m. 1879–1897)
- Children: with Adaline Parkinson; Emma J. (Pottle)^{(b. 1855; died 1938)}; Frank Lee Parkinson^{(b. 1857; died 1913)}; Byron Parkinson^{(b. 1860; died ca.1935)}; with Mary Knickerbocker; Jay A. Parkinson^{(b. 1866; died 1933)}; with Sarah Knickerbocker; Jennie L. Parkinson^{(b. 1870; died 1885)}; Walter K. Parkinson^{(b. 1874; died 1936)}; Anna May Parkinson^{(b. 1876; died 1877)}; with Amelia Simpich; Pauline Parkinson^{(b. 1881; died 1895)}; Frederick B. Parkinson^{(b. 1882; died 1956)}; Wilson Nye Parkinson^{(b. 1885; died 1947)}; Robert G. Parkinson^{(b. 1886; died 1973)}; James D. Parkinson^{(b. 1888; died 1974)}

James Watson Parkinson (September 10, 1829 – January 28, 1897) was an American farmer, Democratic politician, and Wisconsin pioneer. He served two terms in the Wisconsin State Assembly, representing Calumet County during the 1880 and 1893 terms. He also served 20 years as chairman of the Calumet County board of supervisors.

== Biography ==
James W. Parkinson was born in Jefferson County, New York, in September 1829. He received a common school education and moved to Wisconsin in 1855. He stayed briefly in Shebyogan, before settling at Brothertown, in Calumet County, in 1856.

He served as town clerk and superintendent of the local schools, and was justice of the peace for 26 years. He served as chairman of the town board for 23 years, and was chairman of the Calumet County board of supervisors for the last 20 years of his life.

In 1892, he was elected to another term in the Assembly, and served in the 1893–1894 session.

He died at his home in Brothertown, in January 1897.

== Personal life and family ==
J. W. Parkinson was a son of Robert Parkinson, one of the founders of the settlement of Spragueville, or Sprague's Corners, in the town of Antwerp, New York. Robert Parkinson's mother was Elizabeth (née Sargent), who escaped the 1781 Indian raid on Bethel, Maine, in which her first husband, Peter Poor, was killed.

J. W. Parkinson was married four times. He had three children with his first wife, Adaline Wadsworth, who died in 1861. He subsequently married Mary Jane Knickerbocker, with whom he had a son, Jay. After Mary's death in 1866, he married her younger sister, Sarah Eliza Knickerbocker, and had three more children, though two died young. The Knickerbocker sisters were daughters of Philip Knickerbocker, the first postmaster at Chilton, Wisconsin. After Sarah Knickerbocker's death in 1877, Parkinson married Amelia Simpich—a German immigrant—with whom he had five more children, with one dying in childhood. His fourth wife survived him.

== Electoral history ==
=== Wisconsin Assembly (1879) ===
Wisconsin Assembly, Calumet District Election, 1879
| Party | Candidate | Votes | % | ±% |
|---|---|---|---|---|
General Election, November 4, 1879
| Democratic | J. W. Parkinson | 1,605 | 64.38% | −3.86% |
| Independent | Henry Arnold | 513 | 20.58% | |
| Republican | Lemuel Goodell | 375 | 15.04% | −16.72% |
| Plurality | | 1,092 | 43.80% | +7.33% |
| Total votes | | 2,493 | 100.0% | -2.24% |
| Democratic gain from Greenback | | | | |

=== Wisconsin Assembly (1892) ===
Wisconsin Assembly, Calumet District Election, 1892
| Party | Candidate | Votes | % | ±% |
|---|---|---|---|---|
General Election, November 8, 1892
| Democratic | J. W. Parkinson | 1,885 | 64.78% | +2.06% |
| Republican | Nic Frank | 934 | 32.10% | −0.21% |
| Populist | George Cressy | 91 | 3.13% | |
| Plurality | | 951 | 32.68% | +2.27% |
| Total votes | | 2,910 | 100.0% | +57.47% |
| Democratic hold | | | | |

Wisconsin State Assembly
| Preceded by Joseph B. Reynolds | Member of the Wisconsin State Assembly from the Calumet district January 5, 1880 – January 3, 1881 | Succeeded by Casper Petersen |
| Preceded by William V. McMullen | Member of the Wisconsin State Assembly from the Calumet district January 2, 1893 – January 7, 1895 | Succeeded by Joseph Wolfinger |
