= Harrison (village), Wisconsin =

Harrison, Wisconsin
- Village
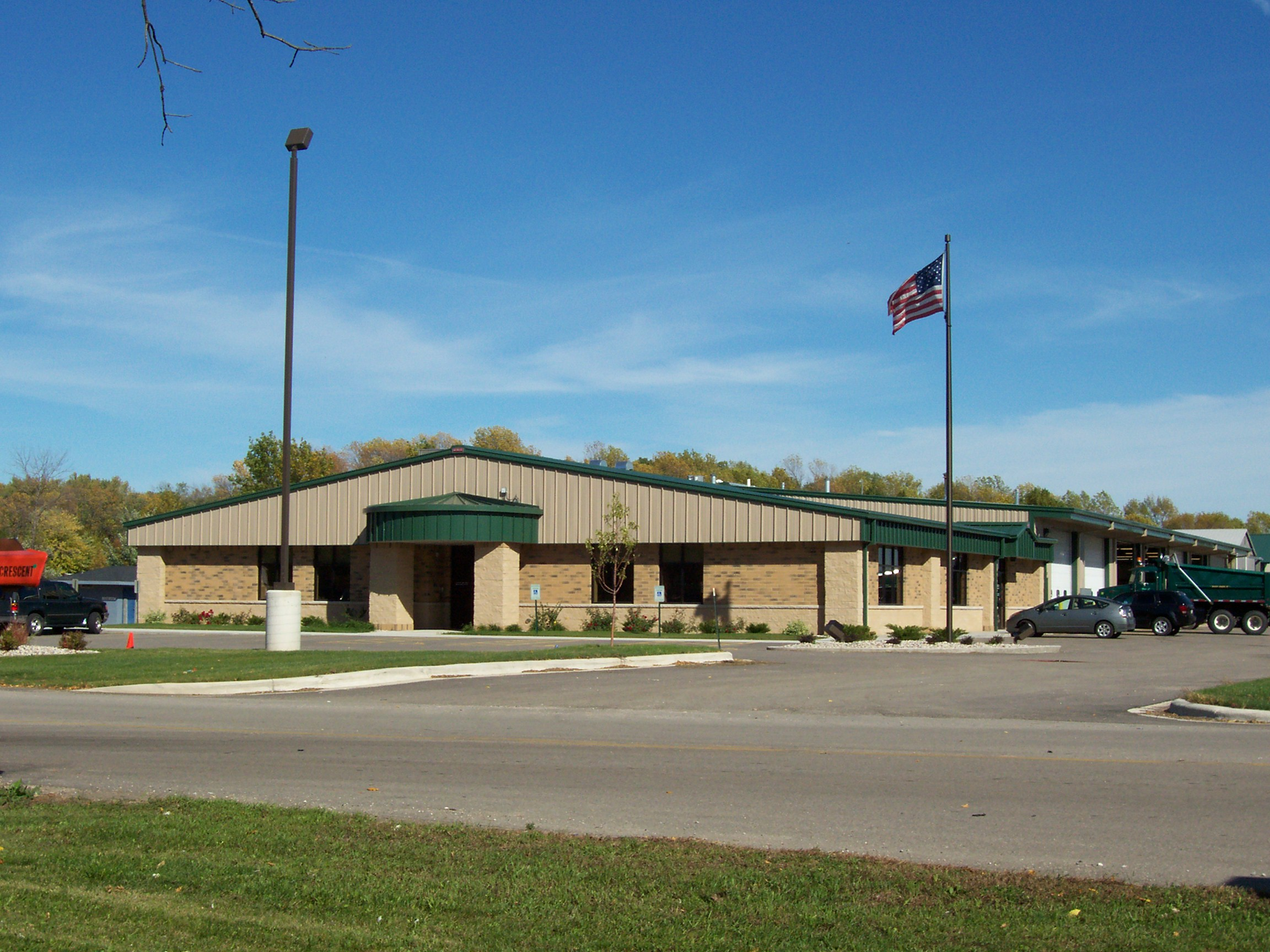
- Village hall

- Location of Harrison in Calumet County, Wisconsin.
- Coordinates: 44°13′36″N 88°20′00″W
- Country: United States
- State: Wisconsin
- Counties: Calumet, Outagamie

Area
  - Total: 31.94 sq mi (82.73 km^{2})
  - Land: 31.87 sq mi (82.55 km^{2})
  - Water: 0.069 sq mi (0.18 km^{2})
- Elevation: 804 ft (245 m)

Population (2020)
  - Total: 12,418
  - Density: 389.6/sq mi (150.4/km^{2})
- Time zone: UTC-6 (Central (CST))
  - Summer (DST): UTC-5 (CDT)
- Area code: 920
- FIPS code: 55-32790
- GNIS feature ID: 2746307
- Website: Village of Harrison

Harrison is a village in Calumet and Outagamie Counties, Wisconsin, United States. It is a part of the Appleton, Wisconsin Metropolitan Statistical Area. The village was created on March 8, 2013, from unincorporated areas of the Town of Harrison and a portion of the Town of Buchanan: the right of way along County Trunk Highway KK in Outagamie County. The village is located in what was the northwestern part of the town of Harrison and borders Appleton and Menasha. As of the 2020 census, it had a population of 12,418, all of which lived in Calumet County.

== History ==
Originally chartered in 1853 as the Town of Lima, Harrison transitioned to become the Town of Harrison in 1858.

The first town meeting took place on the "Pratt farm" south of Sherwood, marking the beginning of Harrison's development.

In 2013, the residents of the town voted to incorporate Harrison into the Village of Harrison, a move certified by Secretary of State Douglas LaFollette on March 8, 2013. Following the incorporation, the Village of Harrison and the Town of Harrison entered into a boundary agreement, reunifying the community under one entity. The incorporation of Harrison into a village marked a significant shift, with some residents resenting the transition from a predominantly rural community to a more suburban one.

== Economy ==
Agriculture remains a significant part of Harrison's economy, with dairy farming, crop production, and livestock raising being primary sources of income for many residents. These farms largely remain in the eastern and southern parts of the community. The village also benefits from its proximity to larger urban centers, providing employment opportunities in various industries.

North Shore Golf Club is a private golf club in Harrison. It is situated along the north shore of Lake Winnebago and was constructed in 1930 largely with the assistance of horses. This 18-hole course was designed by Leonard Macomber.

The Harrison Athletic Association (HAA) provides recreational opportunities through organized sports leagues and events.

== Demographics ==
Historical population
Census	Pop.	Note	%±
2020	12,418		—
U.S. Decennial Census

Harrison has grown significantly in the past decade. It is changing from a rural community to suburban. The majority of the development in Harrison is occurring in the northwestern part of the village with largely residential developments along with several new apartment complexes. This portion of Harrison benefits from its large area of agricultural land and proximity to the greater Fox Valley.

	Population	% Change
1920	1,937	
1930	1,871	-3.41%
1940	2,177	16.35%
1950	2,818	29.44%
1960	2,873	1.95%
1980	3,541	23.25%
1990	3,195	-9.77%
2000	5,756	80.16%
2010	10,839	88.31%
2020	12,439	14.76%

The 2020 U.S. Census estimates the population of Harrison at around 13,179.
