= J. Hayward Haight =

American politician

Joshua Hayward Haight (March 2, 1844 – May 28, 1909) was an American merchant from Brothertown, Wisconsin who served one term as a Greenback Party member of the Wisconsin State Assembly from Calumet County, Wisconsin.

== Background ==
Haight was born in the Town of Laurens, in Otsego County, New York on March 2, 1844; he received a public school education, and became a merchant. He came to Wisconsin in 1855 and settled at Brothertown. During the American Civil War, he enlisted in the 15th Infantry Regiment (United States) on April 28, 1862, and was discharged at Columbus, Kentucky on January 30, 1863, by reason of disability caused by illness.

== Public service ==
Haight was elected town clerk in 1869, re-elected to that post in 1870 and again in 1872 and every year since, at three elections receiving every vote cast. He was elected to the Assembly in 1877 as a Greenback without opposition, receiving 1,601 votes (the incumbent, Democrat Benjamin F. Carter, was not a candidate for re-election), and was assigned to the standing committee on state affairs.

He was not a candidate for re-election the following year, and was succeeded by Joseph B. Reynolds, who ran on both the Greenback and Democratic tickets. Haight sought to return to the seat in the election of 1880 but came in third behind Democratic former Assemblyman Casper Peterson and Republican C. W. Thurston.
