= William Fowler (Brothertown Indian) =

Native American politician (c. 1815–1862)

Member of the House of Representatives of the Wisconsin Territory from the Brown, Calumet, Fond du Lac, Manitowoc, Marquette, Portage, Sheboygan, and Winnebago district
- In office January 6, 1845 – January 5, 1846 Serving with Mason C. Darling and Abraham Brawley
- Preceded by: Albert G. Ellis; Mason C. Darling; David Agry
- Succeeded by: Abraham Brawley; Mason C. Darling; Elisha Morrow

Personal details
- Born: c. 1815 Montauk, New York, U.S.
- Died: October 10, 1862 (aged 46–47) Sulphur Springs, Virginia, C.S.A.
- Cause of death: Wounds received at Battle of Perryville
- Resting place: Camp Nelson National Cemetery, Nicholasville, Kentucky
- Spouse: Mary Brushel
- Children: several

Military service
- Allegiance: United States
- Branch/service: United States Army; Union Army
- Years of service: 1862
- Rank: Sergeant
- Unit: 21st Wis. Vol. Infantry
- Battles/wars: American Civil War: Kentucky Campaign (Sgt., Co. I, 21st Wis.); Battle of Perryville (D.O.W.)

William Fowler (c. 1815 – October 10, 1862) was a Native American politician and the first legislator in Wisconsin of known non-European descent. He served in the 1845 session of the Legislative Assembly of the Wisconsin Territory, representing Calumet County and other northeastern counties, and was later treasurer of Calumet County. During the American Civil War, he volunteered for service in the Union Army and died of wounds he received at the Battle of Perryville in 1862.

== Background ==
William Fowler was born in 1815 into the Brothertown Indians, at a time when his people were living on a small reservation in Oneida County, New York. He was presumably part of one of the five groups of Brothertown people who removed to Wisconsin, arriving on ships at the port of Green Bay between 1831 and 1836, after having traveled across the Great Lakes, when the entire tribe was removed to Wisconsin.

== Tribal affairs ==
Fowler was one of a seven-man committee elected at a civil township town meeting to arrange for the sale of tribally owned saw mill and grist mill(s) to two non-Indians in 1841.

In 1854, Fowler submitted "a memorial of the Brotherton tribe of Indians" to the U.S. Congress advancing a historical claim for $30,000 as compensation for lands allegedly ceded by several treaties. He signed the memorial as the "delegate from the Brotherton Indians" and claimed to be "their legally authorized agent."

== Legislative and other civic offices ==
Fowler served during the 1845 session of the Territorial Assembly ("Third Session of the Fourth Legislative Assembly" January 6-February 24, 1845) as one of three Representatives from a district consisting of Manitowoc, Sheboygan, Brown, Fond du Lac, Marquette, Portage, Calumet, and Winnebago counties. He was identified by a footnote in subsequent Annals of the Legislature as "*Brothertown Indian." (In December 1843, he had been chosen by the Assembly as their fireman for that year's session.)

With Alonzo D. Dick and W. H. Dick, he was one of three Brothertown Indians to serve in Wisconsin's legislature before the Civil War, the only non-white members of that body until the 1908 election of Lucian H. Palmer.

In July 1856, when a Calumet County Agricultural Society was organized, Fowler was elected as one of the vice-presidents. Later that year, he was elected County Treasurer for Calumet County.

== Civil War service and death ==
Fowler enlisted in the United States Army, in the 21st Wisconsin Volunteer Infantry Regiment, during the American Civil War when he was in his late 40s. He was wounded at the Battle of Perryville—his first combat experience—and died of his wounds at Sulphur Springs, Virginia, on October 10, 1862.
