= Brant, Wisconsin =

- Unincorporated community
- Location within Wisconsin Location within the United States
- Coordinates: 44°04′24″N 88°12′13″W
- Country: United States
- State: Wisconsin
- County: Calumet
- Town: Chilton
- Established: 1851
- Elevation: 935 ft (285 m)
- Time zone: UTC-6 (Central (CST))
  - Summer (DST): UTC-5 (CDT)
- Area code: 920
- GNIS feature ID: 1577526

Brant is an unincorporated community in the town of Chilton, Calumet County, Wisconsin, United States.

== History ==
Brant was established in 1851 under the name of Lynn, with Chauncey Vaughn as its first postmaster. It was renamed Brant in 1856. Brant had a post office as of 1876.

== Notable people ==
- Jeremiah Wallace Baldock, Wisconsin State Representative and farmer, lived in Brant.
