= Harrison (town), Calumet County, Wisconsin =

Harrison, Wisconsin
- Town
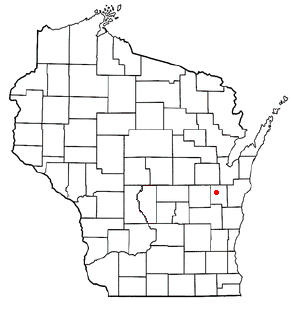
- Location of Harrison, Wisconsin
- Coordinates: 44°12′23″N 88°19′41″W
- Country: United States
- State: Wisconsin
- County: Calumet

Area
  - Total: 59.4 sq mi (153.9 km^{2})
  - Land: 33.5 sq mi (86.8 km^{2})
  - Water: 25.9 sq mi (67.1 km^{2})
- Elevation: 791 ft (241 m)

Population (2020)
  - Total: 0
- Time zone: UTC-6 (Central (CST))
  - Summer (DST): UTC-5 (CDT)
- Area code: 920
- FIPS code: 55-32800
- GNIS feature ID: 1583354

Harrison is a town in Calumet County in the U.S. state of Wisconsin. The population was 10,839 at the 2010 census and 3,471 in 2013 after the incorporation of the Village of Harrison. After continued annexations, the Town of Harrison now consists of 6.2 acres of unpopulated land located off of Oneida Street, which is owned by the City of Menasha. The Village of Harrison and Town of Buchanan are collectively known locally as Darboy. Harrison was originally known as Lima.

On March 8, 2013, the village of Harrison was created from the northwest part of the town.

== Geography ==
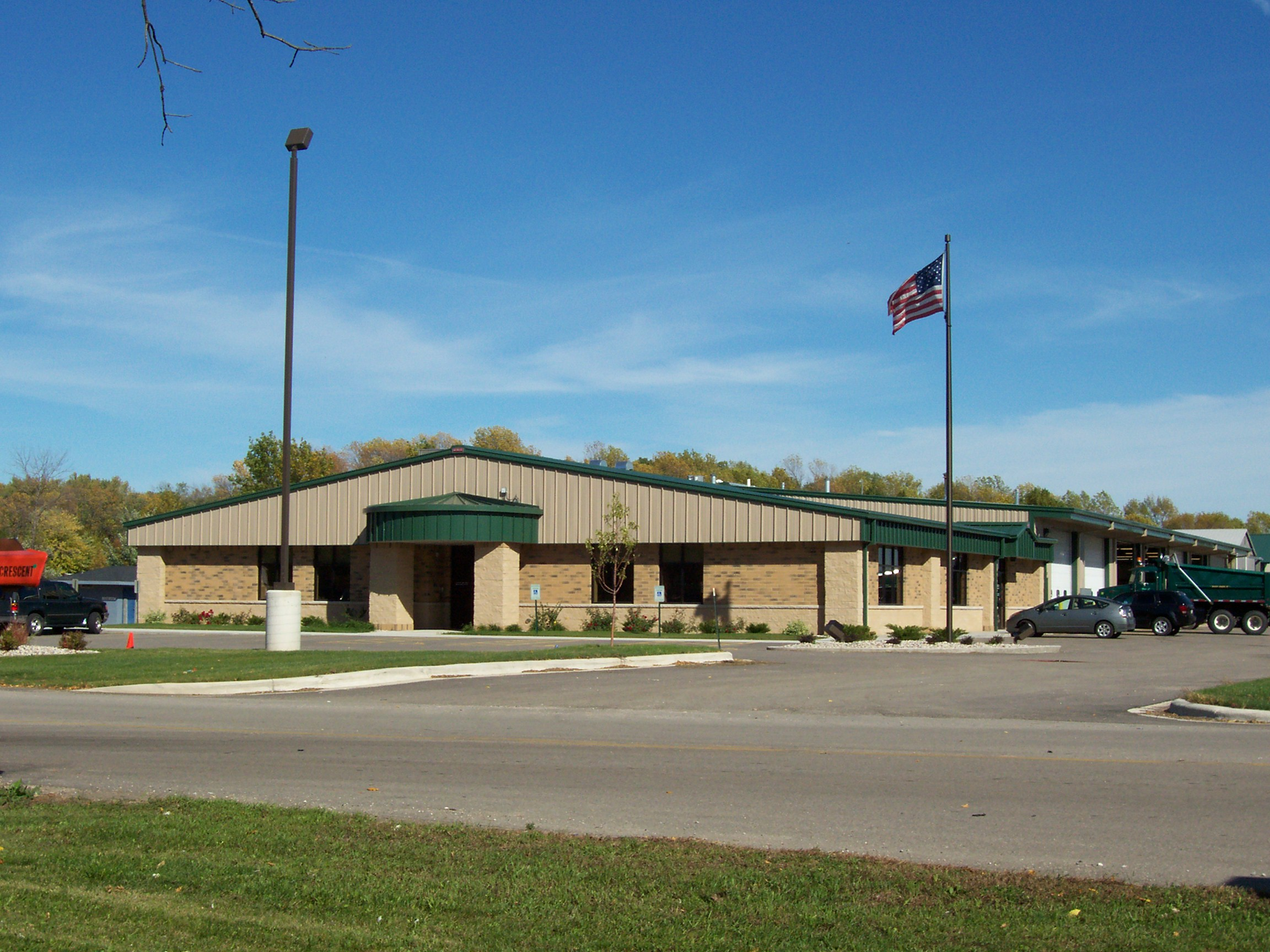
Town Hall

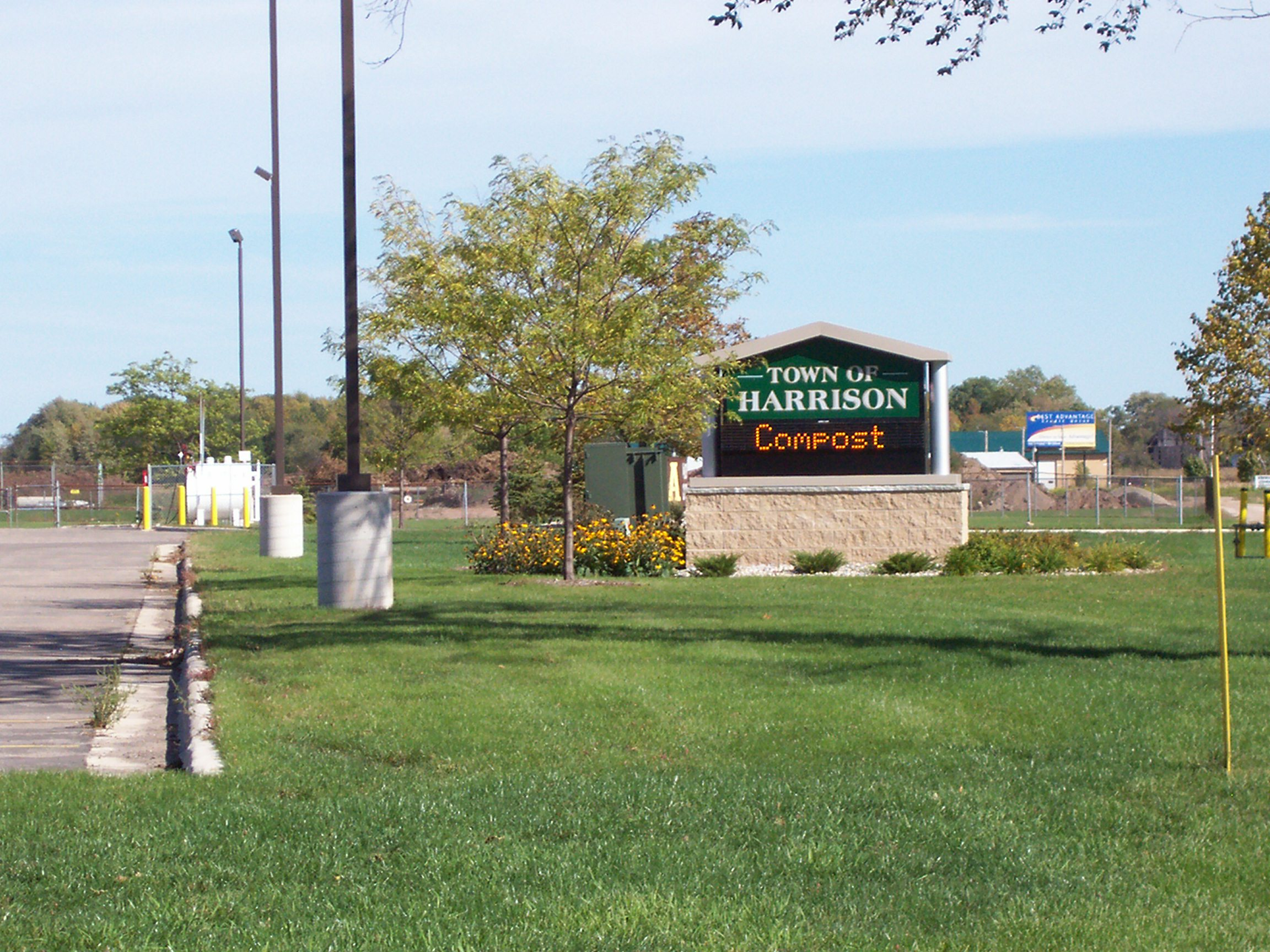
Town Hall sign

According to the United States Census Bureau, the town has a total area of 59.4 square miles (153.9 km^{2}), of which, 33.5 square miles (86.8 km^{2}) of it is land and 25.9 square miles (67.1 km^{2}) of it (43.61%) is water.

== Demographics ==
As of the census of 2000, there were 5,756 people, 1,998 households, and 1,646 families residing in the town. The population density was 171.7 people per square mile (66.3/km^{2}). There were 2,139 housing units at an average density of 63.8 per square mile (24.6/km^{2}). The racial makeup of the town was 98.35% White, 0.40% African American, 0.12% Native American, 0.69% Asian, 0.16% from other races, and 0.28% from two or more races. Hispanic or Latino of any race were 0.59% of the population.

There were 1,998 households, out of which 44.2% had children under the age of 18 living with them, 76.2% were married couples living together, 3.8% had a female householder with no husband present, and 17.6% were non-families. 13.9% of all households were made up of individuals, and 3.4% had someone living alone who was 65 years of age or older. The average household size was 2.88 and the average family size was 3.20.

In the town, the population was spread out, with 31.0% under the age of 18, 4.9% from 18 to 24, 35.8% from 25 to 44, 20.7% from 45 to 64, and 7.6% who were 65 years of age or older. The median age was 35 years. For every 100 females, there were 102.7 males. For every 100 females age 18 and over, there were 102.8 males.

The median income for a household in the town was $66,094, and the median income for a family was $69,729. Males had a median income of $46,268 versus $31,060 for females. The per capita income for the town was $24,690. About 1.4% of families and 1.4% of the population were below the poverty line, including 1.8% of those under age 18 and none of those age 65 or over.

== Intent to incorporate ==
On September 9, 2011, the Town Board of Harrison filled a notice of intent to incorporate as a village. The plan would call for the more densely populated northwestern corner of the town to incorporate into a village of approximately 7,400 residents. On February 19, 2013, there was a referendum approving the incorporation of part of the town as a village. The Wisconsin Secretary of State authorized the new village's incorporation on March 8, 2013. All remaining parts that were still the town of Harrison have been incorporated into the Village of Harrison.

== Notable people ==
- Benjamin F. Carter, Wisconsin State Representative and Senator, farmer and bricklayer, lived in the town
- August T. Dorn, Wisconsin State Representative and farmer, lived in the town
- Henry W. Hupfauf, Wisconsin State Representative, farmer, and businessman, was born in the town
- George J. Schwalbach, Wisconsin State Representative and farmer, was born in the town
