= Jerome F. Fox =

20th century American Democratic politician

Jerome Fox
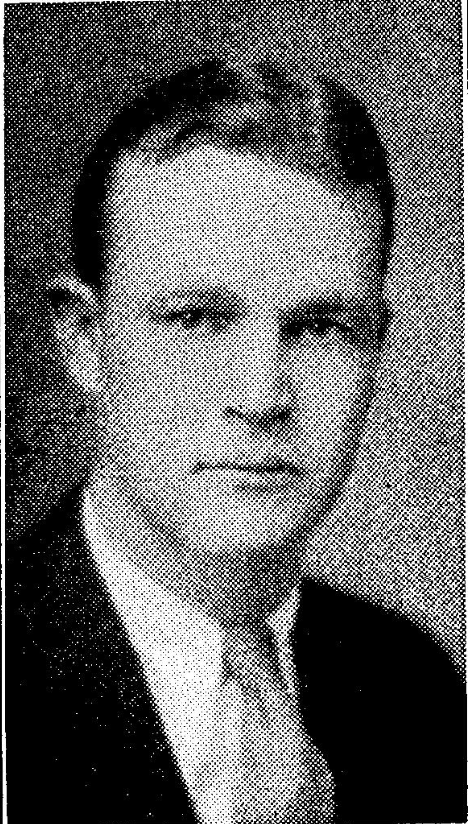
- Photo from the 1931 Wisconsin Blue Book

Chair of the Democratic Party of Wisconsin
- In office October 9, 1948 – October 20, 1951
- Preceded by: Charles P. Greene
- Succeeded by: James E. Doyle

Mayor of Chilton, Wisconsin
- In office April 1946 – April 1952
- Preceded by: John Diedrich
- Succeeded by: Edward Heimann

Member of the Wisconsin State Assembly from the Calumet district
- In office January 5, 1931 – January 7, 1935
- Preceded by: Charles A. Barnard
- Succeeded by: John W. Short

Personal details
- Born: March 26, 1904 Chilton, Wisconsin, U.S.
- Died: September 13, 1957 (aged 53) Chilton, Wisconsin, U.S.
- Resting place: Saint Augustine Cemetery, Chilton, Wisconsin
- Party: Democratic
- Spouse: Rosemary E. Bachhuber (m. 1942–1957)
- Children: 7
- Education: University of Notre Dame
- Profession: Lawyer, politician

Military service
- Allegiance: United States
- Branch/service: United States Navy; U.S. Naval Air Corps
- Rank: Lieutenant
- Battles/wars: World War II

Jerome Francis Fox (March 26, 1904 – September 13, 1957) was an American lawyer and Democratic politician from Calumet County, Wisconsin. He served 3 years as chairman of the Democratic Party of Wisconsin (1948–1951), and in those same years served as mayor of Chilton, Wisconsin. Earlier, he served two terms in the Wisconsin State Assembly, representing Calumet County from 1931 to 1935.

== Biography ==
Born in Chilton, Wisconsin, Fox attended Chilton High School. He received a bachelor's degree from the University of Notre Dame in 1924. He taught and coached at Trinity College, Sioux City, Iowa from 1924 to 1926 and then attended Marquette University Law School. He received a law degree from the University of Wisconsin in 1930, after which he practiced law in Chilton. Fox served in the Wisconsin State Assembly from 1931 to 1935, where he was the Democratic floor leader. He was the legal officer for the Home Owners Loan Corporation until 1938, when he ran for the Democratic nomination for Governor of Wisconsin. Fox served in the United States Navy during World War II. From 1946 to 1952, he was mayor of Chilton. He also served on the Calumet County Board of Supervisors. In 1948, Fox became the chairman of the Wisconsin State Democratic Party. He died of a heart attack at his home in Chilton.

Party political offices
Preceded by Charles P. Greene	Chair of the Democratic Party of Wisconsin; October 9, 1948 – October 20, 1951	Succeeded by James E. Doyle
Wisconsin State Assembly
Preceded by Charles A. Barnard	Member of the Wisconsin State Assembly from the Calumet district January 5, 1931 – January 7, 1935	Succeeded by John W. Short
Political offices
Preceded by John Diedrich	Mayor of Chilton, Wisconsin; April 1946 – April 1952	Succeeded by Edward Heimann
