= Dundas, Wisconsin =

- Unincorporated community
- Location within Wisconsin Location within the United States
- Coordinates: 44°14′03″N 88°11′54″W
- Country: United States
- State: Wisconsin
- County: Calumet
- Town: Woodville
- Elevation: 810 ft (250 m)
- Time zone: UTC-6 (Central (CST))
  - Summer (DST): UTC-5 (CDT)
- Area code: 920
- GNIS feature ID: 1564178

Dundas is an unincorporated community located in the town of Woodville, Calumet County, Wisconsin, United States.

== History ==
A post office called Dundas was first established in 1846. The community was supposedly named by an early settler who had returned from the island of Dundas off the east coast of Africa. The community may also have been named by the first postmaster, David H. Halsted, for William H. Dundas who was the chief clerk of the Post Office Department at the time.

== Notable people ==
- Walter F. Truettner (1881-1967), Michigan Senate member, born in Dundas
- Joseph Wolfinger, Wisconsin State Representative, businessman, and inventor, lived in Dundas.
