= Darboy, Wisconsin =

- Unincorporated community
- Location within Wisconsin Location within the United States
- Coordinates: 44°15′56″N 088°24′06″W
- Country: United States
- State: Wisconsin
- County: Outagamie
- Settled: 1830s
- Post Office Establishment: 1877-1901
- Elevation: 791 ft (241 m)

Population (2005)
  - Unincorporated community: 14,114 (Total of Buchanan and Harrison- Sanitary District slightly less)
  - Metro: 360,000 (Fox Valley)
- Time zone: UTC-6 (CST)
  - Summer (DST): UTC-5 (CDT)
- ZIP Code: 54915
- Area code: 920
- Website: http://www.townofbuchanan.org/

Darboy is an unincorporated community in Outagamie County in the Fox Cities area of the U.S. state of Wisconsin. Located in the town of Buchanan, Darboy extends from the Calumet County line on the south, Highway CE on the north, State Park Road on the east, and Highway 441 on the west. Prior to 2013, Darboy extended south in Calumet County to Manitowoc Road in the town of Harrison; however, this part of Darboy became part of the village of Harrison upon its incorporation.

== History ==
In the pioneer age of Wisconsin, French fur traders and Native Americans frequently traveled through the area now known as Darboy. The first wave of German settlers arrived in the area around 1842 and settled near Old Plank Road, then the only road in the area, running from Lake Winnebago to Kaukauna. A wave of Dutch settlers arrived in 1848, the same year that Wisconsin became a state. They were associated with a group that Father Gothard led to settle at nearby Hollandtown.

The community was named after Catholic Archbishop Georges Darboy, who was martyred during the Franco-Prussian War. A post office was established in 1877, but was discontinued in 1901. In the early 1900s, many businesses sprouted up in Darboy: Van Vorst's Hall (now the Silver Spur), Darboy Butter and Cheese Company, Les Stumpf Ford, Lamers Dairy, Darboy Refrigeration Sales and Service, a cobbler shop, a blacksmith shop, and George Mader Hall.

The History of Holy Angels and the Darboy Community, a book published for the 150th anniversary of Holy Angels Church, says "Our ancestors worked hard, but they always enjoyed a good time." Several bands and singing groups are part of Darboy's history, as well as baseball teams; taverns; and 4-H, Boy Scout, and Girl Scout troops.

Music is also a rich part of Darboy's history. Several singing groups and bands have formed over the years, including the Darboy Orchestra, the Ken Schmalz Band, the Mader singing group, Building Permit, and various groups that sang at Holy Angels Church throughout the years.

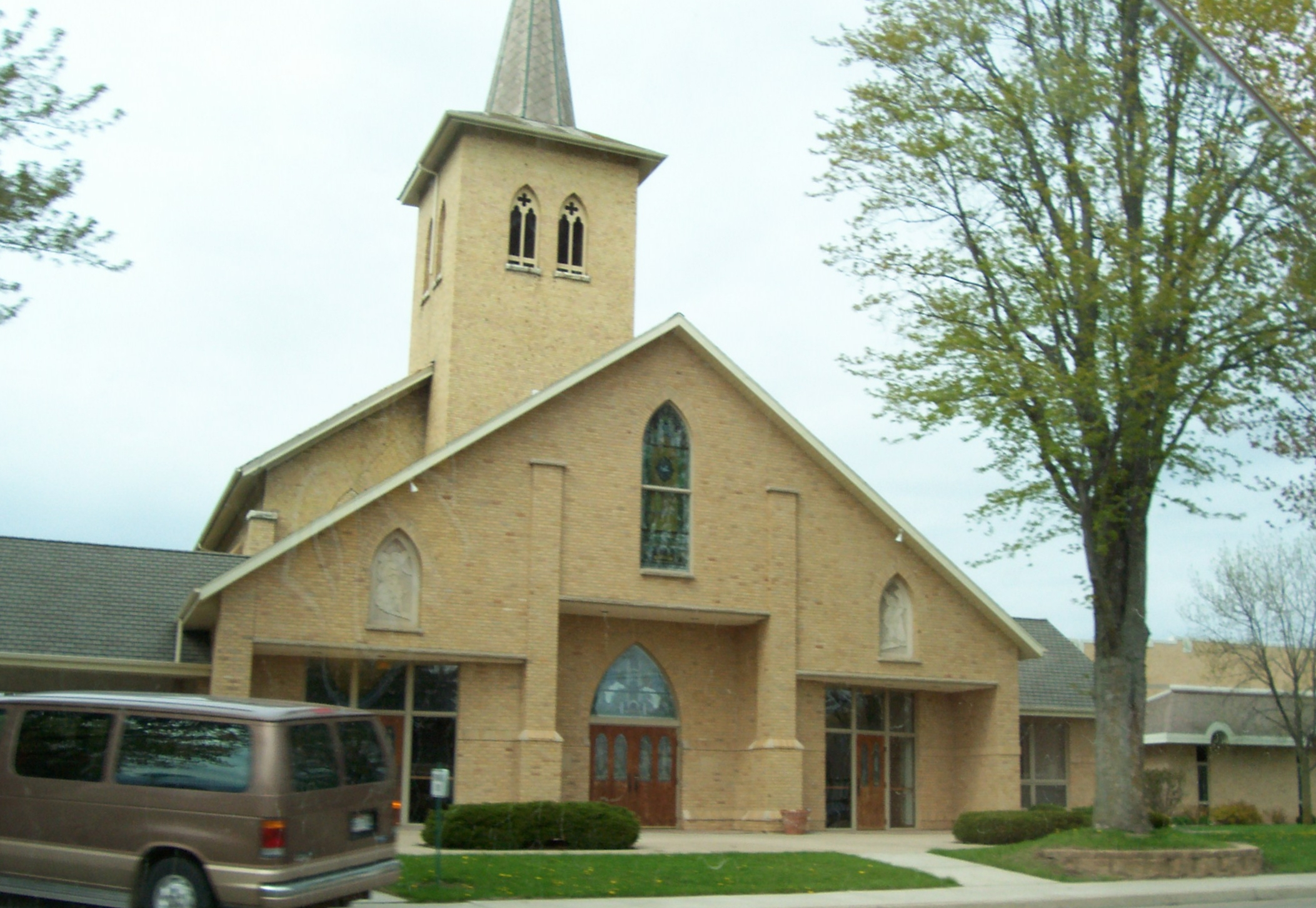
Holy Angels Catholic Church - Holy Spirit Parish

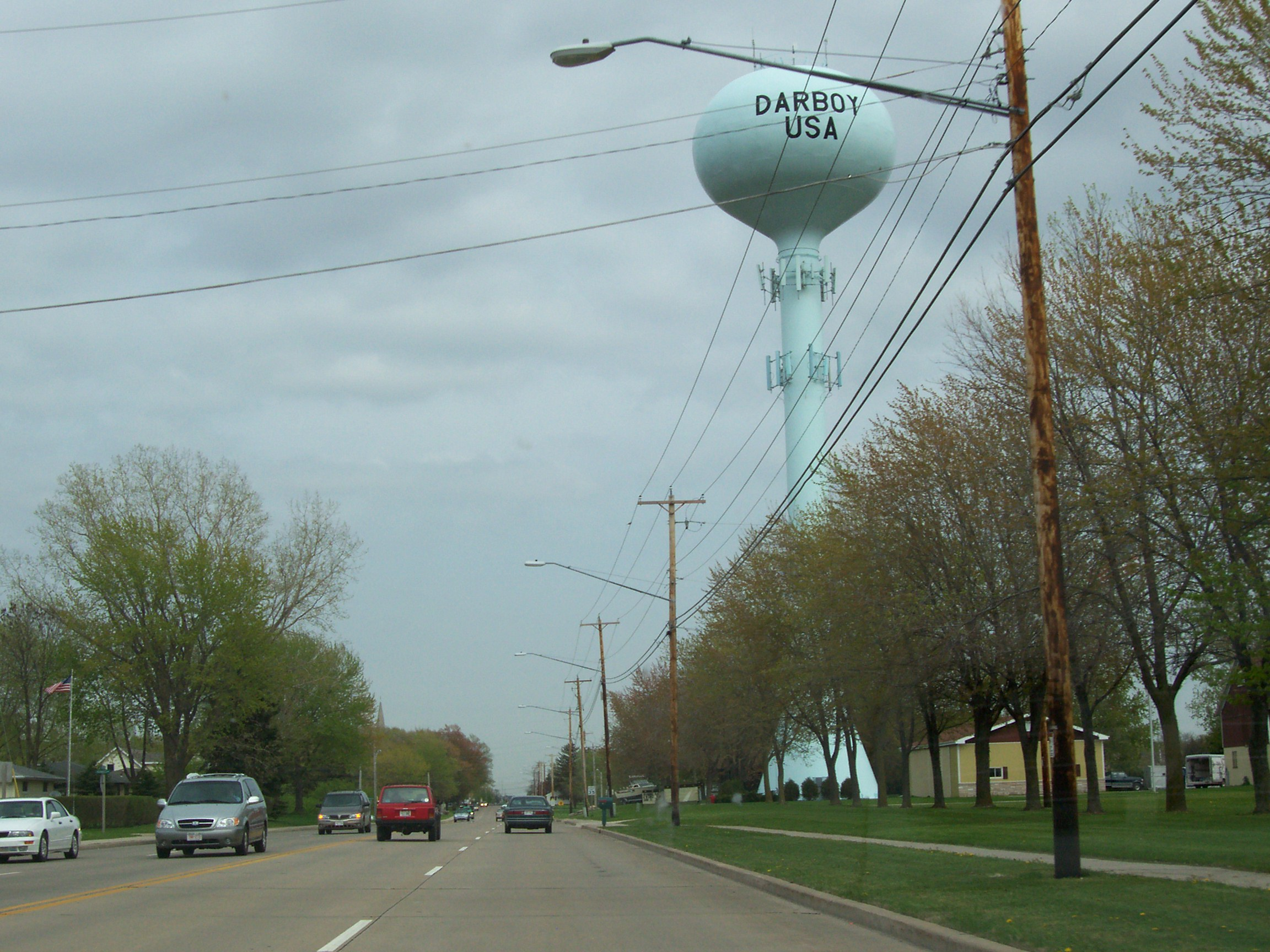
Water tower in Darboy

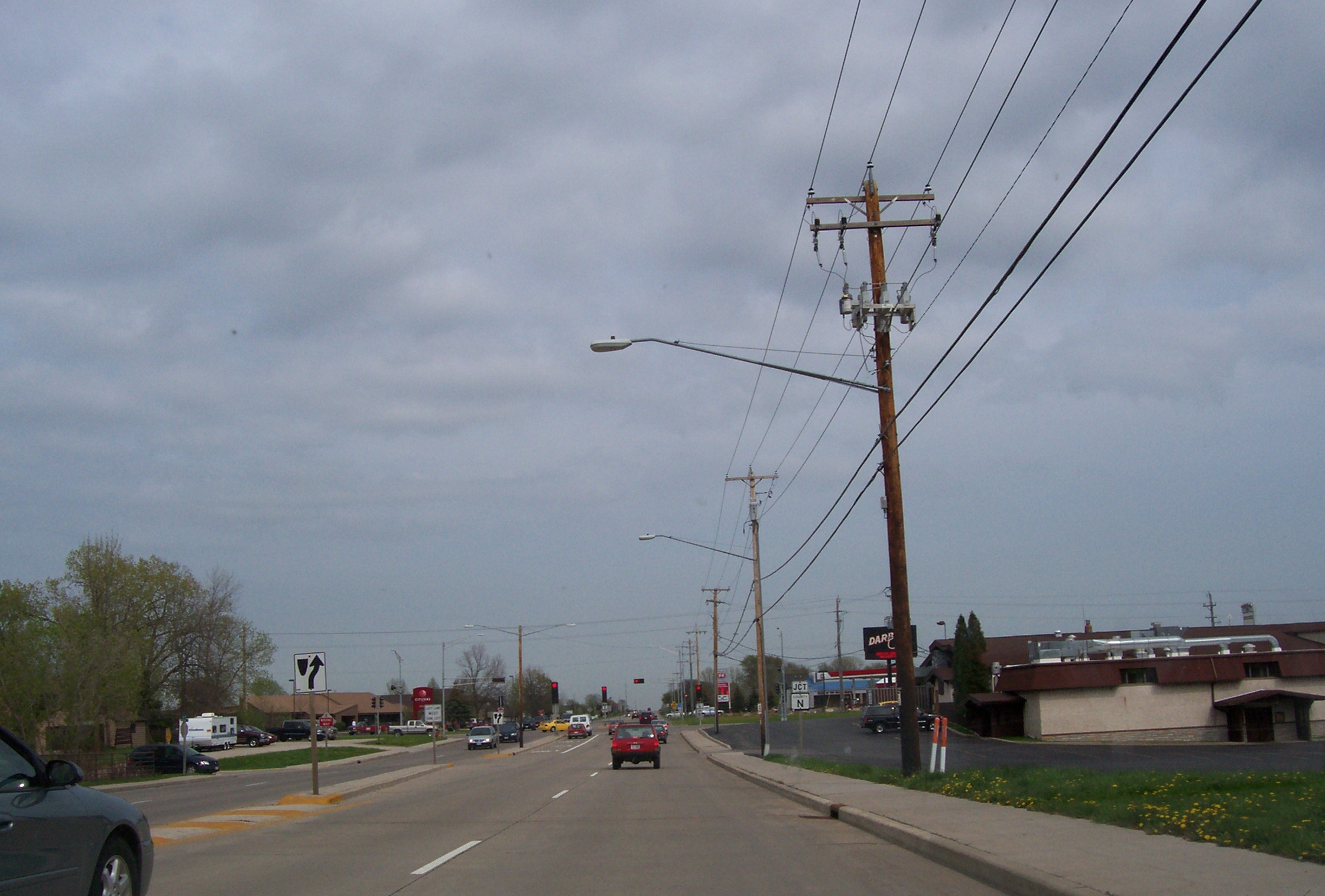
Downtown Darboy

The most historic building in Darboy is Holy Angels Catholic Church, originally called St. Martin's of Manhattan Church. The first Mass held there was in 1839. The Orth family donated a 5-acre (20,000 m^{2}) parcel of land to the parish in 1850, on which a church was built in 1855. The parish was renamed to honor the Guardian Angels in 1857. The present church was built in 1874 on County KK. A Catholic school was built in 1883.

Both the church and school are still operational today. Holy Angels Catholic Parish, however, recently merged with Holy Name of Jesus Parish of Kimberly, and is now called Holy Spirit Parish. The Catholic school was renovated in 1996.

=== Recent history ===
The area was stagnant for most of the twentieth century until the 1970s, when a group of farmers, concerned about the area's future, petitioned for a sanitary district. Construction began in the early 1980s, and was completed in 1984. New houses began to sprout up. "This little crossroads has always been a good place to raise cows and eat chicken, but in recent years hundreds of people have also decided that it is a fine place to build a house," noted an Appleton Post-Crescent article on Sunday, July 1, 1990. Farmers in the Darboy area, which traditionally had been a farming community, turned into developers and sold land to families who could hook up their houses to the new sanitary district. With the completion of State Trunk Highway 441 in 1993, the area gained easier access to the rest of the Fox Cities. This accelerated housing development in Darboy.

The Kimberly School District, which encompasses most of Darboy, erected Sunrise Elementary School on the south side of Darboy off of County Highway N in 1996. This fueled even more growth, as the sanitary district continued to expand. Another public school, Woodland School (containing both Woodland Elementary and a Woodland Intermediate), was built on the south side of Darboy in the Town of Harrison in 2006. More subdivisions were developed near the school, and as a Post-Crescent article says, "Rows of houses began to replace rows of corn" in this traditional farming community.

== Business ==
Commercial business began to move in after the increase in population. The first commercial development took place on the corner of County Highways N and KK in the center of Darboy, when the Darboy Plaza was developed. Larger stores and businesses began to move in on the west side of Darboy as well, on the edge of Appleton. This growth was fueled by the completion of Wisconsin Highway 441 in September 1993. Running along the western border of the Towns of Harrison and Buchanan, the highway provided an easy link from west Appleton, Neenah, Menasha, Kimberly, and Grand Chute, turning the area close to the highway into valuable commercial land. However, soon after the growth of these new businesses Appleton annexed a large portion of the Town of Harrison. Darboy now has a thriving commercial district, which includes seven large stores, eight banks, shops, convenience stores, and other small businesses. In 2019, the Darboy Club, a large banquet hall at the southwest corner of Hwys. N and KK, closed after 57 years of operation.

== Culture ==
Two of Darboy's signature events are the Holy Angels Church Picnic and Chickenfest. The Holy Angels Church Picnic is an annual event that has been a Darboy staple since 1885. Every summer on the third Sunday of August, the community gathers to celebrate its town and parish's heritage with a day of fun, food, and raising money for their parish. There is often live music, games, bingo, an auction, and many other activities. Though Holy Angels has now merged with Holy Name Parish of Kimberly (forming Holy Spirit Parish), the picnic continues to be an annual event because of its immense popularity with the community.

Chickenfest takes place every summer at the Darboy Community Park in the town of Harrison, behind Sunrise Elementary School. Chicken, games, and fireworks help celebrate the history of Darboy. This festival was introduced in 2003 to celebrate the Town of Harrison's sesquicentennial, and is sponsored and operated primarily by the Darboy Kiwanis. Sadly, Chickenfest was celebrated for the final time in the summer of 2017. Kiwanis pulled the plug on Chickenfest for several reasons, most notably due to a lack of volunteers.

== Communications ==
Area news sources include The Post-Crescent (Appleton), The Times-Villager (Kaukauna), and Around Town (Darboy and Sherwood).

== Notable people ==
- Henry W. Hupfauf, farmer, businessman, and Wisconsin State Representative, owned a general store and tavern in Darboy.
