= Walter F. Truettner =

American politician

Walter Frederick Truettner (July 24, 1881 – 1967) was a member of the Michigan Senate.

Truettner was born in Dundas, Wisconsin. He died in Grayling, Michigan.

== Career ==
Truettner served in the Senate from 1923 to 1928. He was also a member of the Michigan Republican State Committee.

He was president of the Bessemer National Bank until 1927, later becoming vice-president of the National Bank of Detroit, and from 1947 to 1955 he held the presidency of the Grayling Bank.
