= Lewis Rupp =

American politician

Lewis Rupp (May 11, 1858 – January 23, 1946; first name often misspelled Louis) was a member of the Wisconsin State Assembly.

== Biography ==
Rupp was born on May 11, 1858, in Fond du Lac County, Wisconsin. Later, he moved to Calumet County, Wisconsin.

== Career ==
Rupp was elected to the Assembly in 1902. Previously, he served as Chairman of the Calumet County Board and a town supervisor and chairman. He was a Democrat.
