= Leopold Strasser =

American politician

Leopold Strasser was a member of the Wisconsin State Assembly.

== Biography ==
Strasser was born on September 19, 1843, in the Austrian Empire. In 1867, he moved to Stockbridge, Wisconsin. He was a merchant by trade. Strasser died on June 25, 1908, in Manhattan. He was a member of the Assembly during the 1885 session. He was a Democrat.
