= James Robinson (Wisconsin politician) =

19th century American politician

Member of the Wisconsin State Assembly from the Calumet district
- In office January 3, 1870 – January 2, 1871
- Preceded by: Casper Petersen
- Succeeded by: William H. Dick
- In office January 5, 1863 – January 4, 1864
- Preceded by: William F. Watrous
- Succeeded by: Thomas McLean
- In office January 4, 1858 – January 3, 1859
- Preceded by: George A. Jenkins
- Succeeded by: Harrison Carroll Hobart
- In office January 3, 1853 – January 2, 1854
- Preceded by: James Cramond
- Succeeded by: Alexander H. Hart

Personal details
- Born: January 5, 1828 New York City, U.S.
- Died: April 8, 1878 (aged 50) Colton, California, U.S.
- Resting place: Agua Mansa Cemetery, Colton, California
- Party: Democratic
- Spouse: Eleanor Mangan (m. 1850; died 1878)
- Children: Andrew Robinson; Mary J. Robinson; Frank Robinson^{(b. 1849; died 1923)}; Eugene Robinson^{(b. 1851)}; William T. Robinson^{(b. 1856; died 1896)}; Nellie J. Robinson^{(b. 1860; died 1878)}; James A. Robinson^{(b. 1864; died 1907)}; Mary R. (Kersten)^{(b. 1868; died 1905)}; Catherine Belle (Thayer)^{(b. 1875; died 1938)}

Military service
- Allegiance: United States Army; United States Volunteers; Union Army
- Years of service: 1848 (USA); 1861 (USV)
- Rank: 1st Lieutenant, USV
- Unit: 4th Reg. U.S. Infantry; 4th Reg. Wis. Vol. Infantry
- Battles/wars: Mexican–American War; American Civil War

James Robinson (January 5, 1828 – April 8, 1878) was an American merchant, Democratic politician, and Wisconsin pioneer. He was a member of the Wisconsin State Assembly, representing Calumet County in the 1853, 1858, 1863, and 1870 sessions.

== Biography ==
James Robinson was born in New York City in January 1828. When he was six years old, he moved with his parents to Chester County, Pennsylvania, where he was raised and educated.

At the outbreak of the Mexican–American War, Robinson attempted to enroll with the militia, but was prohibited due to his young age. As soon as he was able, he enlisted with the regular United States Army, and was enrolled in the 4th U.S. Infantry Regiment, where he was promoted to acting quartermaster sergeant, serving under Ulysses S. Grant, who was then a lieutenant and quartermaster of the regiment.

After the war, Robinson moved to the new state of Wisconsin and settled initially at Green Bay in 1848. By 1850, he had moved to Calumet County, at the site that would later become Chilton.

Shortly after settling there, Robinson was elected to represent Calumet County in the Wisconsin State Assembly. During the 1853 session, he helped to secure a charter for Chilton and the status of Chilton as the county seat for Calumet County. He was subsequently elected to three more terms in the Assembly, serving in 1858, 1863, and 1870. He was also chosen as a delegate to the 1876 Democratic National Convention.

He briefly enrolled with the Union Army for the American Civil War, and was commissioned first lieutenant of Company K in the 4th Wisconsin Infantry Regiment, but he resigned before the regiment left Wisconsin.

In 1877, he relocated to Colton, California, due to health problems. He died of Pneumonia in April 1878, after his wife and daughter died of similar symptoms.

== Personal life and family ==
James Robinson married Eleanor Mangan in 1850. He had at least 9 children. After his death, five children were still living.

== Electoral history ==
=== Wisconsin Assembly (1869) ===
Wisconsin Assembly, Calumet District Election, 1869
Party	Candidate	Votes	%	±%
General Election, November 2, 1869
Democratic	James Robinson	875	52.11%	
Republican	J. H. Cook	804	47.89%	
Plurality		71	4.23%	
Total votes		1,679	100.0%	
Democratic hold				

Wisconsin State Assembly
Preceded by James Cramond	Member of the Wisconsin State Assembly from the Calumet district January 3, 1853 – January 2, 1854	Succeeded by Alexander H. Hart
Preceded by George A. Jenkins	Member of the Wisconsin State Assembly from the Calumet district January 4, 1858 – January 3, 1859	Succeeded by Harrison Carroll Hobart
Preceded by William F. Watrous	Member of the Wisconsin State Assembly from the Calumet district January 5, 1863 – January 4, 1864	Succeeded by Thomas McLean
Preceded by Casper Petersen	Member of the Wisconsin State Assembly from the Calumet district January 3, 1870 – January 2, 1871	Succeeded by William H. Dick
