= Alonzo D. Dick =

American politician

Member of the Wisconsin State Assembly from the Calumet district
- In office January 1, 1849 – January 7, 1850
- Preceded by: Lemuel Goodell
- Succeeded by: David E. Wood

Personal details
- Born: 1813 Oneida County, New York, U.S.
- Died: October 9, 1872 (aged 58–59) Chilton, Wisconsin, U.S.
- Resting place: Union Cemetery, Brothertown, Wisconsin
- Party: Republican; Whig (before 1854)

Alonzo David Dick (1813 – October 9, 1872) was a Brothertown Indian farmer, tavernkeeper, and postmaster from Brothertown, Wisconsin, (then called "Manchester"). As a member of the Whig Party, he served one term in the Wisconsin State Assembly, representing Calumet County.

== Background ==
Born 1813 in upstate New York, Dick was among the Brothertown Indians who left New York in accordance with the agreement which gave them land in Wisconsin Territory. He came with his family (he had married Lureanett or Lucenette Crosley, born 1808 of Pequot and Niantic heritage) on the steamboat United States in 1835. In 1839, he was one of the commissioners elected for the purpose of surveying, dividing and apportioning the lands of the Brothertowns. He received farmland allotments, as did his wife and two children Cornelia (born 1838) and Almira (born 1839). At one point around 1837, Dick was running a tavern in Brothertown.

In 1842, Dick was elected "highway overseer" for the Town of "Kaukalan" (encompassing a large area, including what would later become Wrightstown), where he was an early settler and kept "probably the first tavern in Wrightstown". In 1845 the new federal Department of Indian Affairs paid him $3.19 (~$110.00 in 2025) for his services as a sub-agent, interpreter and teamster.

In 1844, the Brothertowns (most of whom were Methodist) elected Dick as one of a committee to erect new building to replace the log chapel they had been using. ("...made of logs hewn on both sides, about eight inches thick, the ends dovetailed together and crevices filled with mortar. It had a pleasing appearance within and without. It had log seats, and the altar was a hewn piece of log. It could seat 100 people and there was standing room for 100 more.") When Methodist circuit rider W. G. Miller came to Brothertown in the spring of 1845, he was hosted by Dick, who served as one of the stewards of the congregation. It was the beginning of what Miller described as "a life-long friendship." Decades later, a white visitor recalled Dick in 1836 as "a very good singer" who served as the "starter" for the congregation's singing.

== Legislature ==
Dick was elected to the Assembly's Calumet County district for the 2nd Wisconsin Legislature, replacing Democrat Lemuel Goodell, who was elected to the State Senate. He was assigned to the standing committees on town and county organization, and on state lands. He was succeeded by fellow Whig David E. Wood.

With William Fowler and W. H. Dick, he was one of three Brothertown Indians to serve in Wisconsin's legislature before the Civil War, the only non-white members of that body until the 1908 election of Lucian H. Palmer.

== After the legislature ==
Dick is recorded as the postmaster of what was still called the Pequot post office in 1851.

He died at his home in Chilton, Wisconsin, in October 1872.
