= Chilton (town), Wisconsin =

Town in Wisconsin, United States

Chilton, Wisconsin
- Town
- Town of Chilton
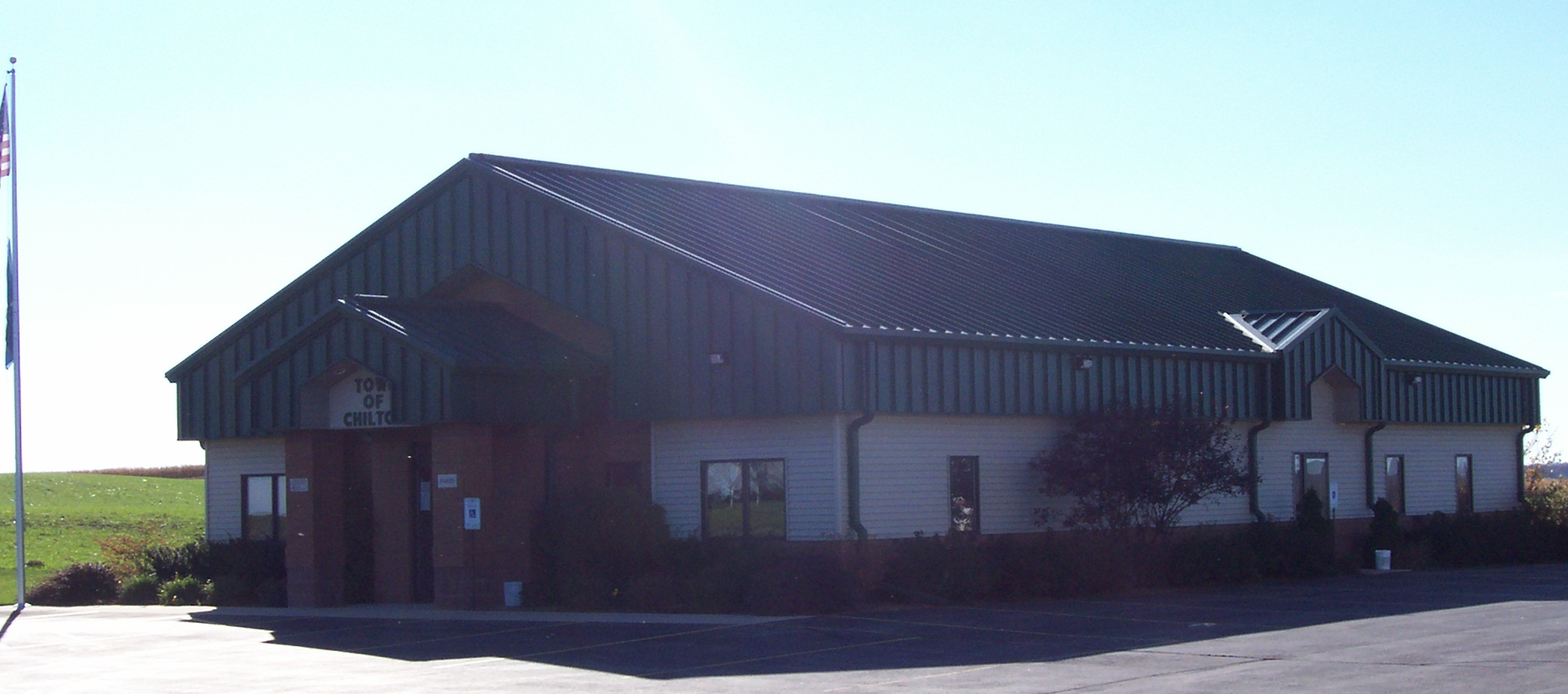
- Chilton Town Hall

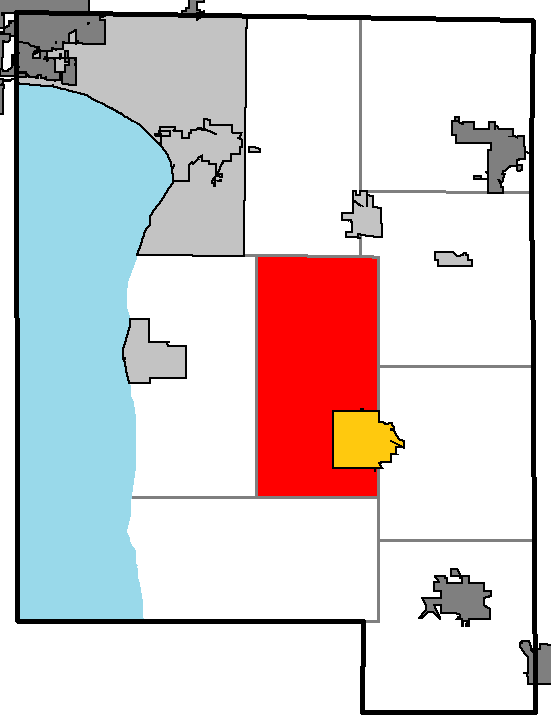
- Location of Chilton, within Calumet County
- Coordinates: 44°03′52″N 88°11′38″W
- Country: United States
- State: Wisconsin
- County: Calumet

Area
  - Total: 32.59 sq mi (84.4 km^{2})
  - Land: 32.45 sq mi (84.0 km^{2})
  - Water: 0.15 sq mi (0.39 km^{2})

Population (2020)
  - Total: 1,059
  - Density: 32.63/sq mi (12.60/km^{2})
- Time zone: UTC-6 (Central (CST))
  - Summer (DST): UTC-5 (CDT)
- Area code(s): 920 & 274
- GNIS feature ID: 1582955

Chilton is a town in Calumet County in the U.S. state of Wisconsin. The population was 1,059 at the 2020 census, down from 1,143 at the 2010 census. The city of Chilton is located partially within the town. The unincorporated community of Brant is located in the town.

== Geography ==
The Town of Chilton is located in central Calumet County. The city of Chilton is in the southeastern part of the town. According to the United States Census Bureau, the town has a total area of 32.6 square miles (84.4 km^{2}), of which 32.4 square miles (84.0 km^{2}) is land and 0.2 square miles (0.4 km^{2}), or 0.45%, is water.

== Demographics ==
As of the census of 2000, there were 1,130 people, 366 households, and 311 families residing in the town. The population density was 34.8 people per square mile (13.4/km^{2}). There were 371 housing units at an average density of 11.4 per square mile (4.4/km^{2}). The racial makeup of the town was 98.41% White, 0.09% Black or African American, 0.18% Native American, 0.35% from other races, and 0.97% from two or more races. 0.62% of the population were Hispanic or Latino of any race.

There were 366 households, out of which 46.2% had children under the age of 18 living with them, 76.0% were married couples living together, 4.6% had a female householder with no husband present, and 15.0% were non-families. 12.3% of all households were made up of individuals, and 5.7% had someone living alone who was 65 years of age or older. The average household size was 3.09 and the average family size was 3.37.

In the town, the population was spread out, with 32.2% under the age of 18, 8.4% from 18 to 24, 29.9% from 25 to 44, 19.6% from 45 to 64, and 9.9% who were 65 years of age or older. The median age was 34 years. For every 100 females, there were 98.2 males. For every 100 females age 18 and over, there were 107.0 males.

The median income for a household in the town was $53,603, and the median income for a family was $56,413. Males had a median income of $34,688 versus $24,583 for females. The per capita income for the town was $19,561. About 2.2% of families and 2.3% of the population were below the poverty line, including 1.5% of those under age 18 and 9.1% of those age 65 or over.

== Notable people ==
- Jeremiah Wallace Baldock, Wisconsin State Representative and farmer, lived in the town, in the community of Brant
- John Short, Wisconsin State Representative and farmer, was born in the town; Short served as chairman of the Chilton Town Board
