= George J. Schwalbach =

American farmer and politician

George J. Schwalbach (May 5, 1866 – May 11, 1966) was an American farmer and politician.

Born in the town of Harrison, Calumet County, Wisconsin, Schwalbach was a farmer and drilled wells. He was also president and general manager of the Darboy Butter & Cheese Company. Schwalbach served as the Harrison town clerk and town chairman. Schwalbach also served on the school board as clerk. Schwalbach served in the Wisconsin State Assembly in 1921 and was a Democrat. Schwalbach died in a hospital in Kaukauna, Wisconsin after a few weeks of ill health and having just turned 100 years old.
