= Daniel R. Curtin =

American businessman and politician

Daniel R. Curtin (July 3, 1855 – October 17, 1916) was an American businessman, farmer, and politician.

Born in the town of Woodville, Calumet County, Wisconsin, he went to the Calumet County public schools and to the mining school in Ontario, Canada. He was in the real estate, mining, and lumber business. Curtin was also a dairy farmer. Curtin also owned the site where Biwabik, Minnesota is now located; for ten years, Curtin was in the mining and lumber business. In 1905, Curtin served in the Wisconsin State Assembly as a Republican from Calumet County. In 1908, Curtin and his wife moved to Milwaukee, Wisconsin. He died in Milwaukee, Wisconsin.
