= August T. Dorn =

American politician

August Theodore Dorn (March 25, 1849 – April 3, 1923) was an American farmer and politician.

Born in Tempelburg, West Prussia, Dorn emigrated with his parents to the United States in 1860 and settled in Oshkosh, Wisconsin. He eventually settled on a farm in the town of Harrison, Calumet County, Wisconsin. He was also involved with the banking and telephone business. Dorn served as chairman of the Harrison Town Board. He also served on the school board and as justice of the peace. In 1913, Dorn served in the Wisconsin State Assembly and was a Democrat. Dorn died in Chilton, Wisconsin.
