= David E. Wood =

19th century American politician and Union Army colonel

Member of the Wisconsin State Assembly from the Calumet district
- In office January 7, 1850 – January 6, 1851
- Preceded by: Alonzo D. Dick
- Succeeded by: William H. Dick

Personal details
- Born: December 10, 1823 New Bedford, Pennsylvania, U.S.
- Died: June 17, 1862 (aged 38) Fond du Lac, Wisconsin, U.S.
- Cause of death: Disease
- Resting place: Rienzi Cemetery, Fond du Lac
- Party: Republican; Whig (before 1854)

Military service
- Allegiance: United States
- Branch/service: United States Army; Union Army
- Years of service: 1861–1862
- Rank: Colonel
- Commands: 14th Reg. Wis. Vol. Infantry
- Battles/wars: American Civil War: Battle of Shiloh (W.I.A.)

David Evans Wood (December 10, 1823 – June 17, 1862) was an American lawyer, judge, politician, and Wisconsin pioneer. He was a member of the Wisconsin State Assembly, representing Calumet County in the 1850 term. He died of disease while serving as a Union Army colonel in the American Civil War.

== Background ==
Wood was born in Beaver County, Pennsylvania, in 1823. He was a college graduate and had practiced law before he came to Wisconsin, about 1848. He first settled in Manchester (later renamed "Brothertown").

== Legislature ==
He was elected in 1849 to serve a one-year term as a member of the Wisconsin State Assembly, representing Calumet County in the 3rd Wisconsin Legislature in 1850. He was a Whig, and succeeded Alonzo D. Dick (also a Whig). He was not re-elected in 1850, and was succeeded by Democrat William H. Dick.

== Fond du Lac and war ==
In 1851 he moved to Fond du Lac County, where he practiced law. He served as probate judge of Fond du Lac County from 1854-57. Upon the outbreak of the American Civil War, in the fall of 1861 he enlisted and became colonel of the 14th Wisconsin Infantry Regiment. The 14th Wisconsin was raised at Fond du Lac, under Wood; the camp in Fond du Lac where they trained was renamed "Camp Wood," after him. The 14th Wisconsin was mustered into Federal service on January 30, 1862. They fought at the Battle of Shiloh, earning much praise and the nickname "the Wisconsin Regulars." Wood was injured during the battle. He contracted an unspecified disease in the South, returned home and died of fatigue and disease on June 17, 1862.

Military offices
Regiment established	Command of the 14th Wisconsin Infantry Regiment; January 30, 1862 – June 17, 1862	Succeeded by Col. John Hancock
Wisconsin State Assembly
Preceded by Alonzo D. Dick	Member of the Wisconsin State Assembly from the Calumet district January 7, 1850 – January 6, 1851	Succeeded by William H. Dick
