= Joseph B. Reynolds =

American politician

Joseph Birdsall Reynolds (February 5, 1836 – March 27, 1898) was an American lawyer from Chilton, Wisconsin who served one term as a member of the Wisconsin State Assembly from Calumet County. He was elected as both a Greenback Party and Democratic candidate.

== Background ==
Reynolds was born in the Town of Greene in Chenango County, New York on February 5, 1836; he was educated at Cortland Academy, and at Harvard University, taking the classical and legal courses. After leaving college, he read law in the law offices of his father, Robert Orin Reynolds and in that of his grandfather, Joseph Reynolds (congressman), a local judge. He was admitted to the bar at Binghamton, New York on January 15, 1857, and for a few years practiced law in that state. Contrary to the information in his obituary, Joseph first moved west to Minnesota, where he practiced Law and lived with his uncle, Lyman Reynolds and his late aunt Catherine's widower, Augustus L. Ballard. Sometime after the June 21, 1860 US Census for Lakeland, Washington County, Minnesota, he moved to Chilton, Wisconsin going into partnership with local attorney Harrison Carroll Hobart.

When the American Civil War began, a company was formed in Chilton by Hobart, and Reynolds was one of the first to enlist. He enlisted as a private in the 4th Wisconsin Volunteer Cavalry Regiment, and was successively promoted to 2nd Lieutenant, 1st Lieutenant, and Captain. In the fall of 1862, he was the victim of a severe illness, but returned to his home and was eventually nursed back to health.

After the close of the war, he went to Europe for further study, taking a post-graduate course at Heidelberg University. Completing his studies, he traveled through Europe, acting as correspondent for various American journals. While in Frankfurt am Main in Germany, he met Virginia A. C. Lapi, whom he married on September 7, 1867. He remained in Europe until 1869; moved to New York City, where he practiced law until 1874, when he returned to Chilton and opened a law office.

== Public office ==
Reynolds was elected to the Assembly in 1878, receiving 1,740 votes to 810 for Republican J. B. Nugent (the incumbent, Greenbacker J. Hayward Haight, was not running for re-election). Although elected on both the Greenback Party and Democratic tickets, he was listed as a Greenbacker in the "List of Members of Assembly" in the Wisconsin Blue Book for 1879. He was assigned to the standing committees on railroads and on medical societies.

He was not a candidate for re-election in 1879, and was succeeded by Democrat J. W. Parkinson. (Even though the Calumet County seat had been held for two terms by Greenbackers, there was no official Greenback in the 1879 race, although one Henry Arnold ran as an independent.)

== After the Assembly; personal life ==
He remained in Chilton a few years and then moved to Boone, Iowa, where he took charge of an extensive farm owned by him. He was described in his obituary as "tall, being over six feet, and of a commanding presence that would attract attention wherever he appeared." He and Virginia had four children, all of whom had died before Reynolds himself died on March 28, 1898 (the last, Robert, only about a year prior). He was buried in Chilton's Hillside Cemetery.
