= Woodville, Calumet County, Wisconsin =

Woodville, Wisconsin
- Town
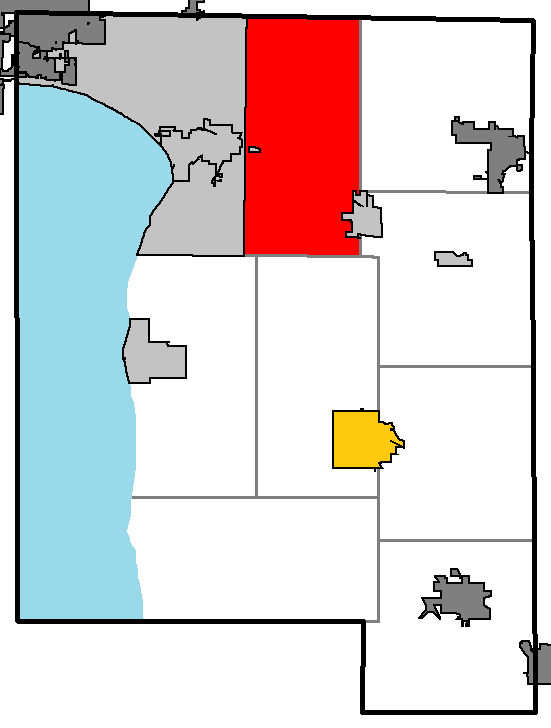
- Location of Woodville, within Calumet County
- Coordinates: 44°10′57″N 88°12′17″W
- Country: United States
- State: Wisconsin
- County: Calumet

Area
  - Total: 32.7 sq mi (84.7 km^{2})
  - Land: 32.7 sq mi (84.6 km^{2})
  - Water: 0.039 sq mi (0.1 km^{2})
- Elevation: 817 ft (249 m)

Population (2020)
  - Total: 850
  - Density: 26/sq mi (10/km^{2})
- Time zone: UTC-6 (Central (CST))
  - Summer (DST): UTC-5 (CDT)
- Area code: 920
- FIPS code: 55-89000
- GNIS feature ID: 1584480
- Website: townofwoodvillewi.gov

There is also the village of Woodville in St. Croix County, Wisconsin.

Woodville is a town in Calumet County in the U.S. state of Wisconsin. The population was 850 at the 2020 census, down from 980 at the 2010 census. The unincorporated communities of Dundas and St. John are located in the community.

== Geography ==
The town of Woodville is in northern Calumet County and is bordered to the north by Outagamie and Brown counties. The village of Hilbert is along the southern part of the town's eastern border. According to the United States Census Bureau, the town has a total area of 32.7 square miles (84.7 km^{2}), of which 32.7 square miles (84.6 km^{2}) is land and 0.04 square miles (0.1 km^{2}), or 0.12%, is water.

== Demographics ==
As of the census of 2000, there were 993 people, 333 households, and 270 families residing in the town. The population density was 30.2 people per square mile (11.7/km^{2}). There were 337 housing units at an average density of 10.2 per square mile (4.0/km^{2}). The racial makeup of the town was 98.99% White, 0.40% Native American, 0.10% Asian, and 0.50% from two or more races. Hispanic or Latino of any race were 0.10% of the population.

There were 333 households, out of which 39.6% had children under the age of 18 living with them, 73.3% were married couples living together, 4.8% had a female householder with no husband present, and 18.9% were non-families. 14.4% of all households were made up of individuals, and 5.1% had someone living alone who was 65 years of age or older. The average household size was 2.98 and the average family size was 3.37.

In the town, the population was spread out, with 28.4% under the age of 18, 8.7% from 18 to 24, 30.2% from 25 to 44, 24.3% from 45 to 64, and 8.5% who were 65 years of age or older. The median age was 35 years. For every 100 females, there were 112.2 males. For every 100 females age 18 and over, there were 114.8 males.

The median income for a household in the town was $52,375, and the median income for a family was $61,667. Males had a median income of $35,402 versus $22,813 for females. The per capita income for the town was $23,411. About 3.0% of families and 4.5% of the population were below the poverty line, including 5.5% of those under age 18 and 3.3% of those age 65 or over.

== Notable people ==
- Daniel R. Curtin, Wisconsin State Representative, businessman, and farmer, was born in the town
- Joseph Wolfinger, Wisconsin State Representative, businessman, and inventor, lived in the town; Wolfinger served on the Woodville Town Board
