= Hayton, Wisconsin =

- Unincorporated community
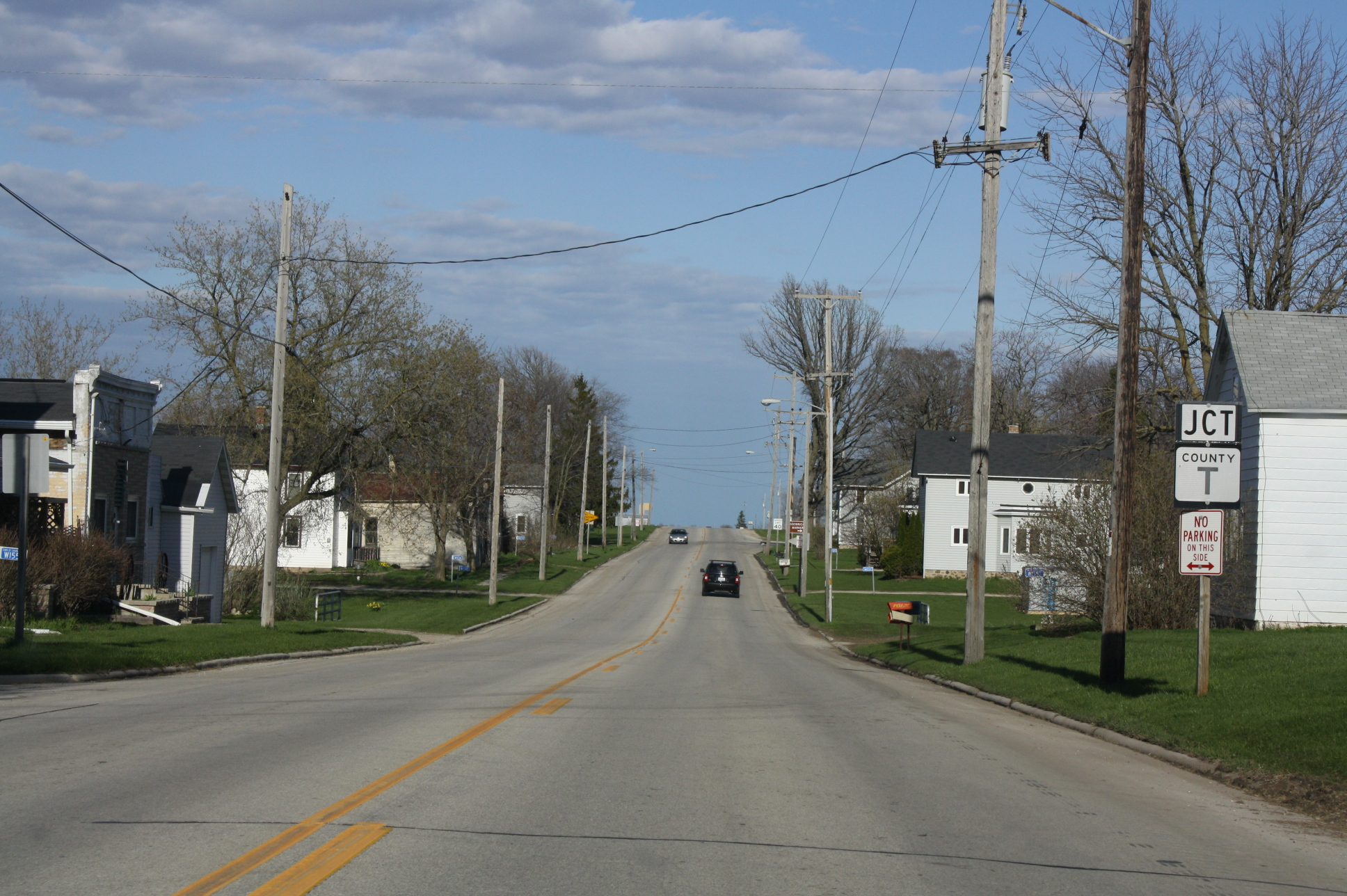
- Downtown Hayton

- Location within Wisconsin Location within the United States
- Coordinates: 44°01′21″N 88°06′58″W
- Country: United States
- State: Wisconsin
- County: Calumet
- Town: Charlestown
- Settled: 1840s
- Elevation: 830 ft (250 m)
- Time zone: UTC-6 (Central (CST))
  - Summer (DST): UTC-5 (CDT)
- Area code: 920
- GNIS feature ID: 1566223

Hayton is an unincorporated community in the town of Charlestown, Calumet County, Wisconsin, United States. It is located a few miles (kilometers) east of Chilton at the intersection of U.S. Route 151 and County T.

== Location ==
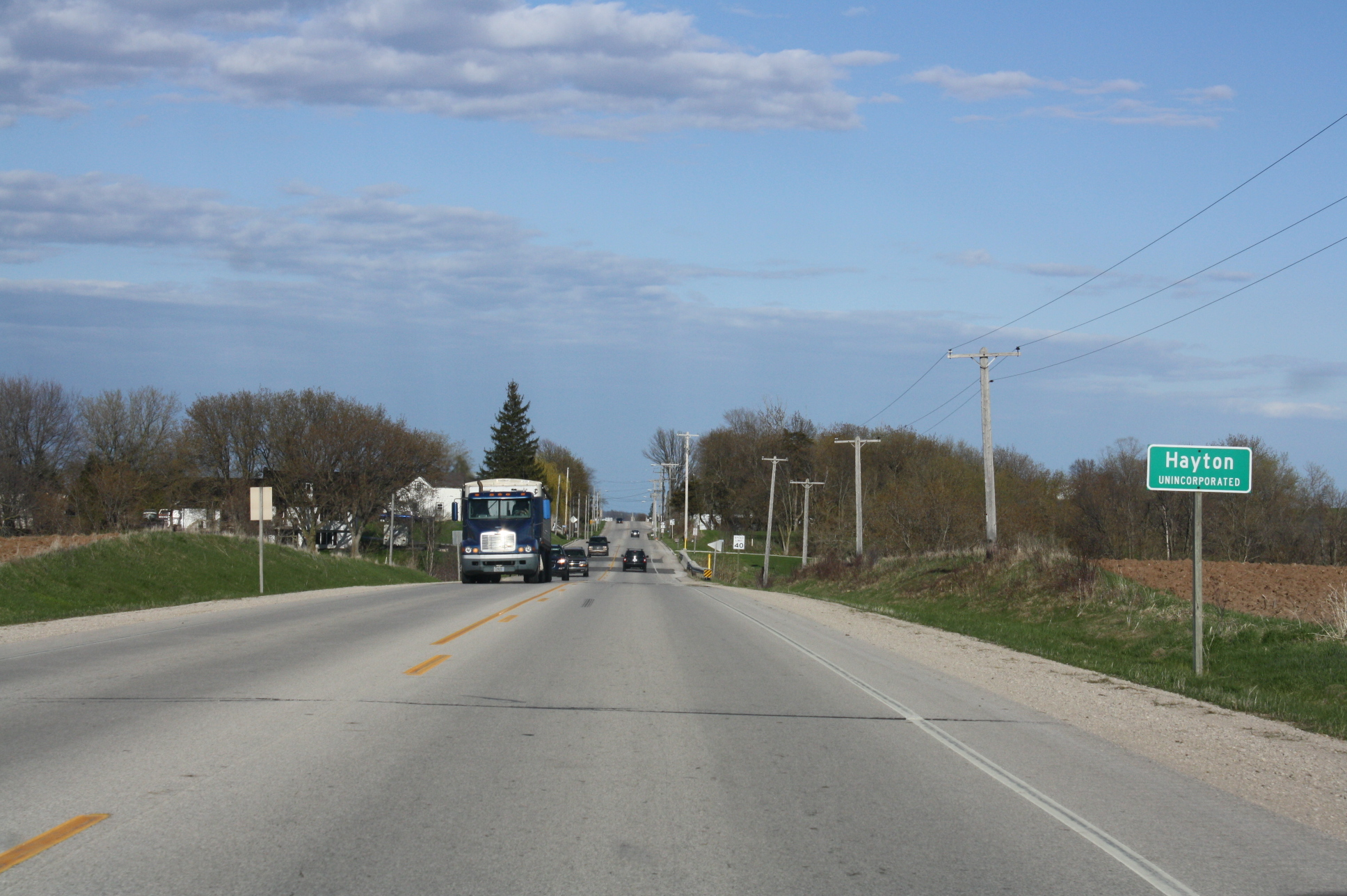
Sign for Hayton

The Killsnake River, a fork of the Manitowoc River, flows eastward through the community. It is dammed by a mill and the sediments have been contaminated by PCBs.

== History ==
Hayton was the first settlement on the Killsnake River. It was settled in the 1840s by William Urmston and it was originally named Wallersville after one of the landowners before it was renamed Hayton.

== Notable people ==
- Jeremiah Wallace Baldock, Wisconsin State Assemblyman and farmer, lived in Hayton.
- William D. Carroll, Wisconsin State Senator, was born in Hayton.
