= Henry Horst =

American politician

Henry Horst (October 15, 1836 – March 4, 1905) was an American farmer and politician.

Born in Germany, Horst emigrated with parents to the United States in 1846 and settled in Pittsburgh, Pennsylvania. In 1850, Horst and his parents moved to the town of Charlestown, Calumet County, Wisconsin. Horst was a farmer. He served on the Charlestown Town Board and was chairman of the town board. Horst also served on the Calumet County Board of Supervisors and was chairman of the county board. In 1876, Horst served in the Wisconsin State Assembly and was a Democrat. Horst died of pneumonia.
