= Otto Luehrs =

American farmer and politician

Otto H. Luehrs (April 10, 1851 – August 30, 1934) was an American farmer and politician.

Born in Altona, Duchy of Holstein, then part of Denmark, Luehrs and his parents emigrated to the United States in 1857 and settled in Plymouth, Wisconsin. In 1867, Luehrs and his family moved to a farm in the town of Charlestown, Calumet County, Wisconsin. Luehrs served on the Charlestown Town Board and the school board, serving as the clerk of the school board. In 1917, Luehrs served in the Wisconsin State Assembly and was a Republican. In 1917, Luehrs and his wife moved to New Holstein, Wisconsin. He later served as justice of the peace for New Holstein. Luehrs died of a stroke in New Holstein, Wisconsin.
