= John Short (Wisconsin politician) =

American politician

John W. Short (June 29, 1874 – January 29, 1951) was an American farmer and politician.

Born on a farm in the town of Chilton, Calumet County, Wisconsin, Short went to Milwaukee Business College. He was a farmer and lived in the town of Chilton. Short served as Chilton town clerk and was also Chilton Town Board chairman. He also served on the school board as the board clerk. Short served on the Calumet County Board of Supervisors and was chairman of the county board. In 1935, Short served in the Wisconsin State Assembly and was a Democrat. He was defeated for the 1936 Democratic nomination by Henry W. Hupfauf. Short died at St. Elizabeth Hospital in Appleton, Wisconsin and is buried at Saint Augustine Cemetery in Chilton.
