= Jeremiah Wallace Baldock =

American politician

Jeremiah Wallace Baldock (March 11, 1842 – December 5, 1919) was an American farmer and politician.

Born in Parma, Ohio, Baldock and his parents moved to Hayton, Wisconsin, in 1852, and then settled in the town of Chilton, Calumet County, Wisconsin. Baldock lived in Brant, Wisconsin and was a farmer. During the American Civil War, Baldock served in the 18th Wisconsin Volunteer Infantry Regiment. In 1899, Baldock served in the Wisconsin State Assembly as a Republican. Baldock died of a stroke at his home in Brant, Wisconsin.
