= William H. Dick =

American politician

William H. Dick (January 7, 1815 - May 3, 1882) was a Brothertown Indian farmer, carpenter and politician who served two terms, 20 years apart, in the Wisconsin State Assembly.

== Background ==
Dick was born in Oneida County, New York on January 7, 1815. He came to Wisconsin in 1831 with his family, who settled with most of their kindred in Brothertown. He became a farmer. In 1843, his father William Dick (sometimes called "William Dick Sr."), who had been a "peacemaker" (a tribal title for the Brothertown Indians) in New York, was one of three men elected to serve as county commissioners for the newly organized Calumet County (previously part of Brown County). He married Juliette Peters (1825-1901), also a Brothertowner.

== Elective office ==
He was elected from the Calumet County district of the Wisconsin State Assembly as a Democrat to serve for the 1851 term (the 4th Wisconsin Legislature), replacing Whig incumbent David E. Wood. His election was challenged (unsuccessfully) because of his race. He would be succeeded by fellow Democrat James Cramond.

On March 12, 1851, he was elected to the General Committee of the newly organized Wisconsin State Agricultural Society.

In 1858, he was elected county treasurer.

In 1870 Dick was elected from the same district to serve in the 1871 term (Democratic incumbent James Robinson was not a candidate), receiving 1,055 votes to 562 for Republican George Montgomery and 75 for independent Hector McLean. He was assigned to the standing committee on internal improvements. In 1871 he was not nominated for re-election, and veteran fellow Democrat Casper H. M. Petersen would return to the Assembly seat he'd held before.

With Alonzo D. Dick and William Fowler, he was one of three Brothertown Indians to serve in Wisconsin's legislature before the Civil War, the only non-white members of that body until the 1908 election of Lucian H. Palmer.

== After the legislature ==
He died May 3, 1882, after suffering a stroke on April 28 while working as a carpenter at a lime kiln in nearby Charlestown. He is buried in Union Cemetery in Brothertown.
