= Lemuel Goodell =

American pioneer and politician

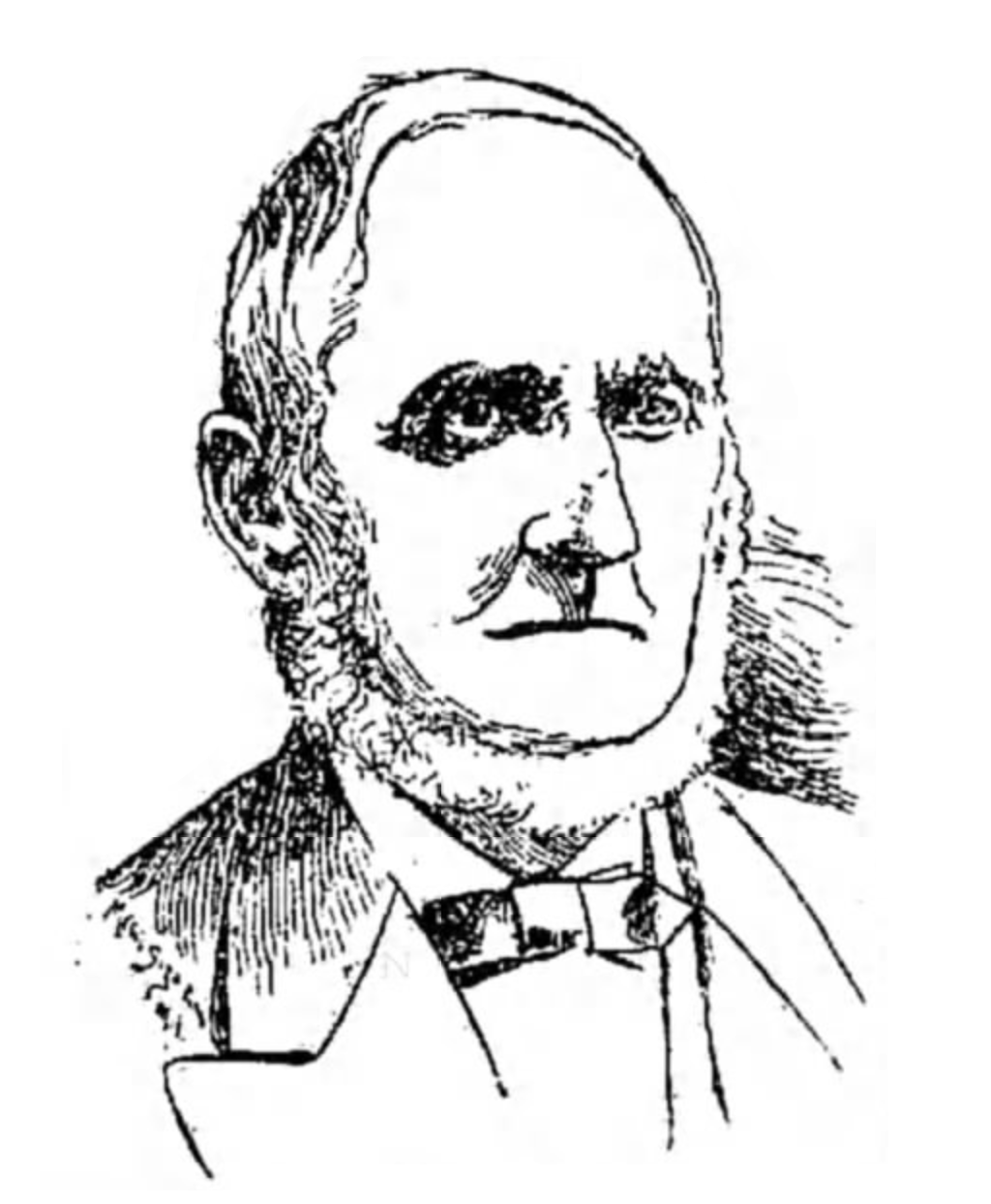

Member of the Wisconsin Senate from the 1st district
- In office January 1, 1849 – January 6, 1851
- Preceded by: Harrison Carroll Hobart
- Succeeded by: Theodore Conkey

Member of the Wisconsin State Assembly from the Calumet district
- In office June 5, 1848 – January 1, 1849
- Preceded by: Position Established
- Succeeded by: Alonzo D. Dick

Personal details
- Born: November 27, 1800 Pomfret, Connecticut, U.S.
- Died: April 9, 1897 (aged 96) Stockbridge, Wisconsin, U.S.
- Resting place: Lakeside Cemetery, Stockbridge, Wisconsin
- Party: Republican (1870s); Democratic (1840s)
- Spouses: 1st wife (died 1841); Louisa Holt (died 1871)
- Profession: Farmer

Lemuel Goodell (November 27, 1800 – April 9, 1897) was a farmer and politician in Michigan and Wisconsin who also worked as a teacher, restaurateur and law enforcement officer.

== Background ==
Goodell was born on November 27, 1800, in Pomfret, Connecticut, the youngest of 12 children. He attended local public schools, but dropped out at the age of 15, going to work at an older brother's nearby farm and teaching school in the winter. He went to work for a general store in Alexandria Bay, New York, and in 1828 moved to Detroit, Michigan.

In Detroit he operated a restaurant for a couple of years with his brother, selling that out to go to work for a hotel. He was appointed a constable (a patronage job) in 1831, and began a political career. He took office as a sheriff, a prison warden and other positions.

== Wisconsin political career ==
Goodell moved to Green Bay, Wisconsin, in the early 1840s, later moving to Stockbridge, where he bought a farm of 120 acres where he would live the rest of his life. He was a delegate to Wisconsin's first constitutional convention in 1846, representing Calumet County. After Wisconsin's admission to the union in 1848, he was a member of the Wisconsin State Assembly in the 1st Wisconsin Legislature that same year representing the county. He was a member of the Democratic Party. He was elected to Wisconsin's 1st State Senate district (Brown, Calumet, Manitowoc, and Sheboygan counties)) for the 2nd Wisconsin Legislature meeting in 1849-1850, replacing fellow Democrat Harrison C. Hobart (his Assembly seat was taken by Whig Alonzo D. Dick).

== Personal life ==
Goodell was married two times. It was reported that his first wife was killed in 1841 by hostile Indians in Detroit "on the common where Capitol square is now" (presumably Capital Park) and her brother taken into captivity (and held for two years) in the same attack, although in fact by 1841 the state capitol had been in that location for three or four years.

Goodell died on April 9, 1897.
