= Buchanan, Wisconsin =

- Town
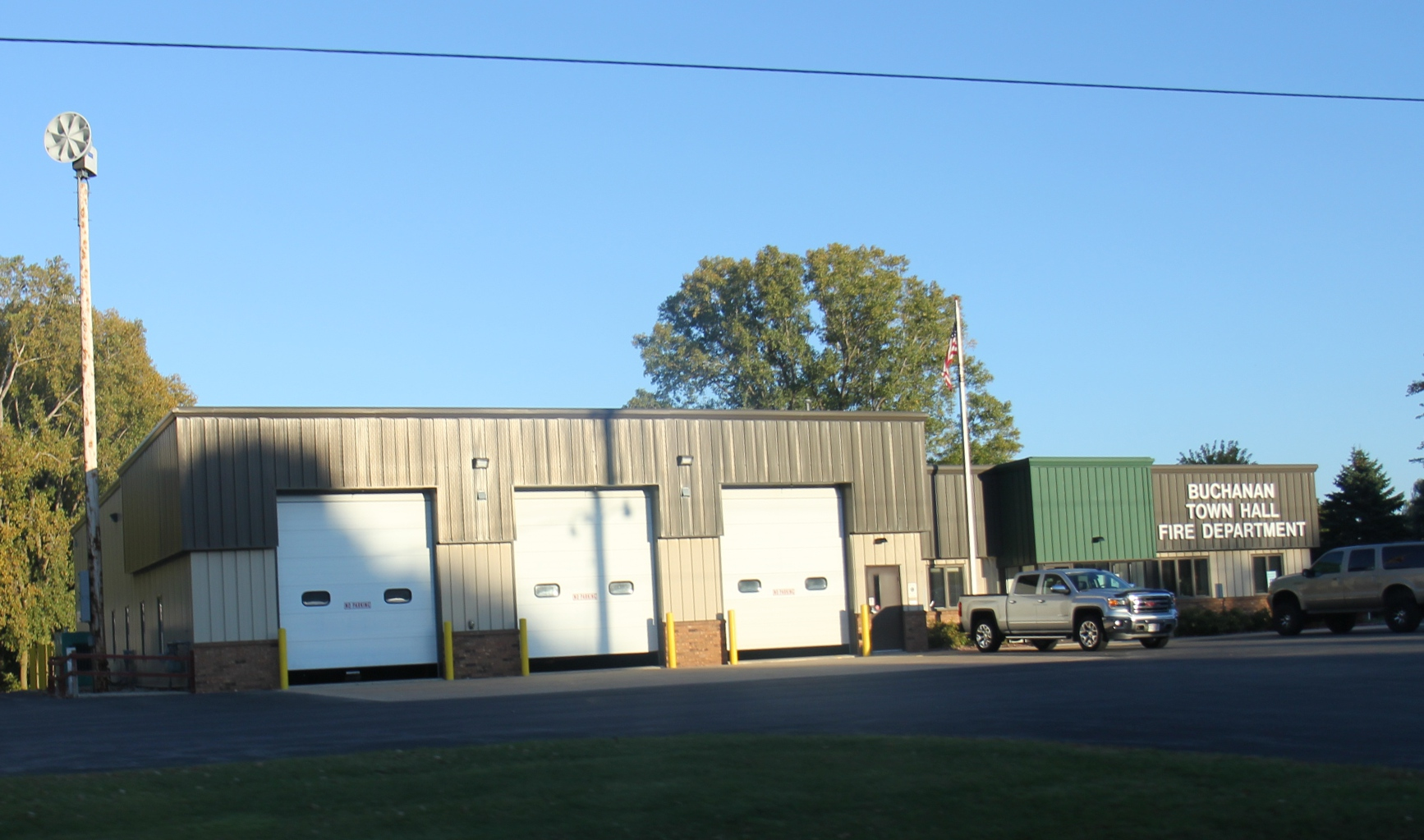
- Town hall
- Motto: "In the Spirit of Town Government"
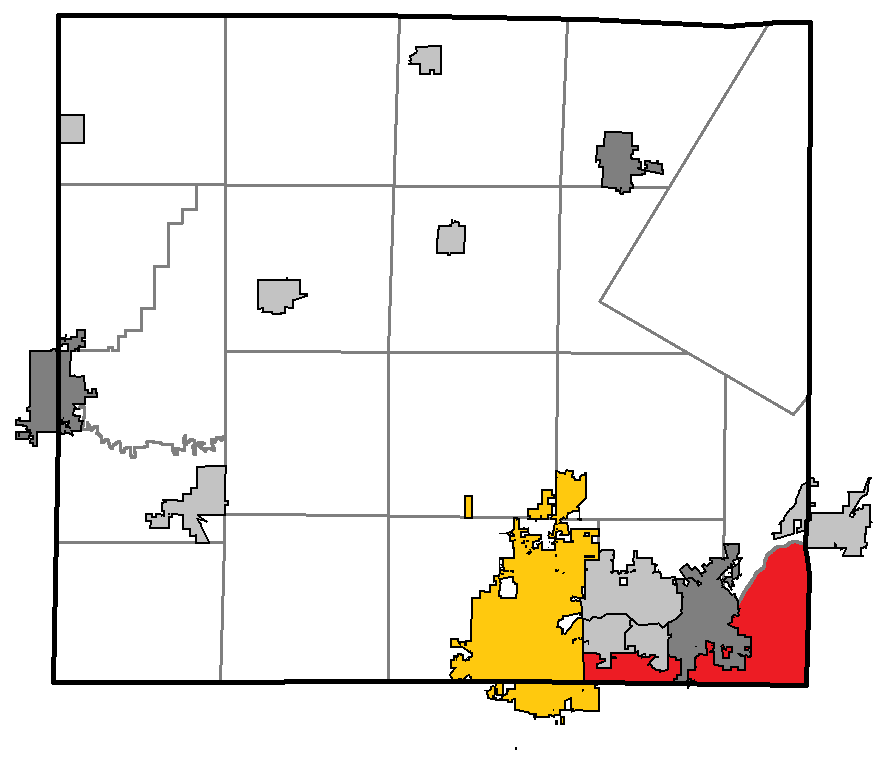
- Location of Buchanan, within Outagamie County
- Coordinates: 44°15′26″N 88°17′36″W
- Country: United States
- State: Wisconsin
- County: Outagamie

Area
  - Total: 16.9 sq mi (43.8 km^{2})
  - Land: 16.6 sq mi (43.0 km^{2})
  - Water: 0.35 sq mi (0.9 km^{2})
- Elevation: 719 ft (219 m)

Population (2020)
  - Total: 6,857
  - Density: 413/sq mi (159/km^{2})
- Time zone: UTC-6 (Central (CST))
  - Summer (DST): UTC-5 (CDT)
- Area code: 920
- FIPS code: 55-10750
- GNIS feature ID: 1582881
- Website: Town of Buchanan, Wisconsin

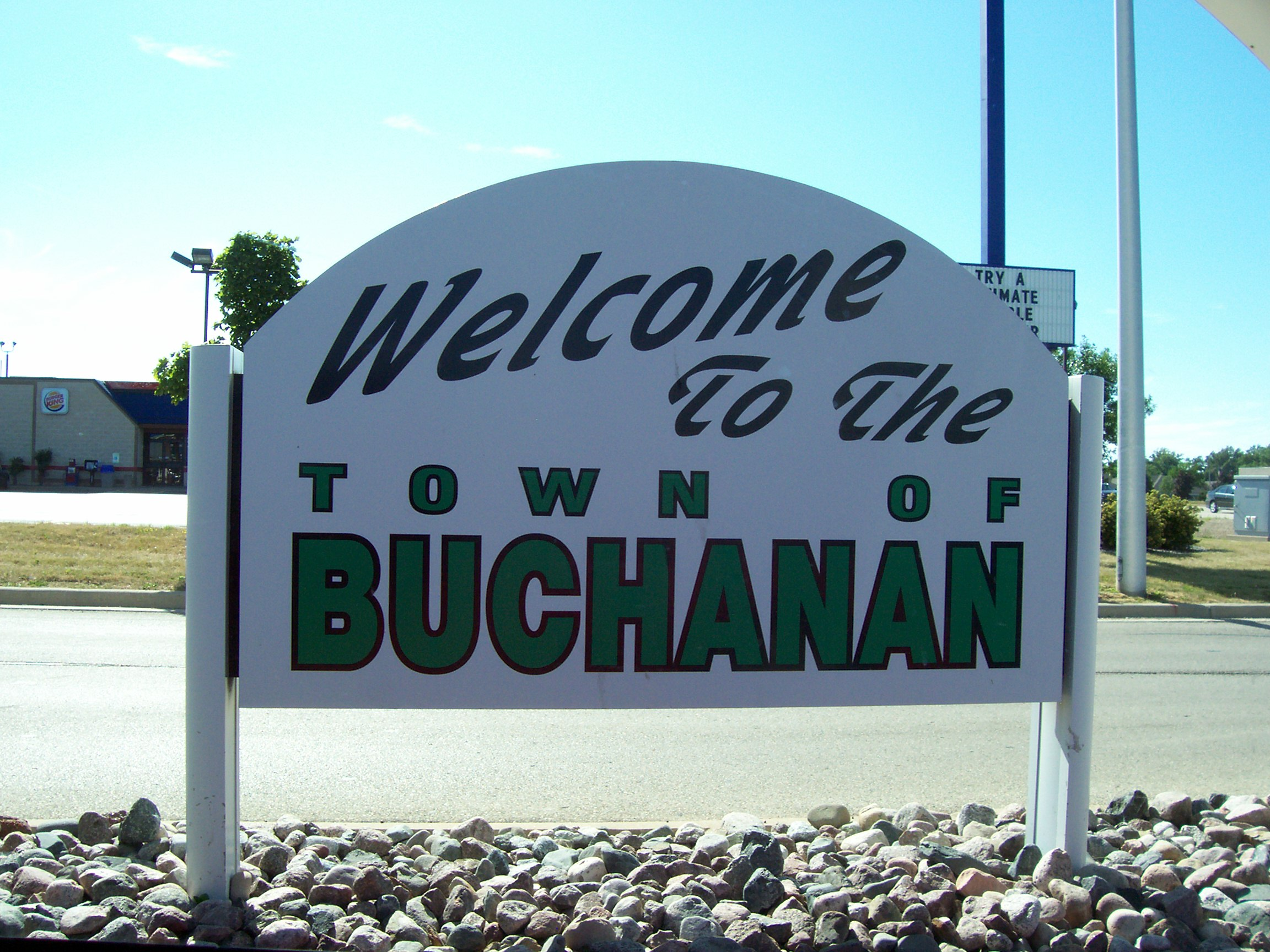
Welcome sign

Buchanan is a town in Outagamie County, Wisconsin, United States. The population was 6,793 in July 2025, according to the U.S. Census Bureau's Population Estimates Program. The unincorporated community of Darboy is located in the town.

== Geography ==
According to the United States Census Bureau, the town has a total area of 16.9 square miles (43.8 km^{2}), of which 16.6 square miles (43.0 km^{2}) is land and 0.3 square mile (0.9 km^{2}) (2.01%) is water.

== Demographics ==
According to the U.S. Census Bureau's American Community Survey, the town had 2,994 households between 2020 - 2024. As of the census of 2020, the population density was 455.3 people per square mile. The racial makeup of the town was 88.4% White, 8.6% Asian, 1.5% from two or more races, 0.5% Hispanic or Latino, and 0.4% Black.

The average number of people per household was 2.26 and 11.5% of households spoke a language other than English.

4.0% of the population is under the age of 5, 17.2% under the age of 18, and 19.4% above the age of 65. The percentage of females was 48.7%. Foreign-born persons was 3.8%.

The median income for a household was $105,478. 2.3% of the population lives in poverty.

== Business ==
Wisconsin International Raceway is located on County Road KK, East of Highway 55 in the town of Buchanan.
