= Henry W. Hupfauf =

American farmer, businessman, and politician

Henry W. Hupfauf (August 11, 1885 – October 6, 1946) was an American farmer, businessman, and politician.

Hupfauf was born in the town of Harrison, Calumet County, Wisconsin. He was a farmer and worked for the Menominee River Sugar Company. He operated a tavern and general store in Darboy, Wisconsin and was involved with the dairy and telephone cooperatives. He served as town clerk and school clerk of the school district. In 1937, Hupfauf served in the Wisconsin State Assembly and was a Democrat.
