= Joseph Wolfinger =

American politician

Joseph Wolfinger, Sr. (January 7, 1857 – August 17, 1941) was an American businessman, inventor, and politician.

Born in the town of Wilson, Sheboygan County, Wisconsin, he learned the blacksmith trade and moved to Dundas, in the town of Woodville, Calumet County, Wisconsin in 1877. In 1881, Wolfinger went into the manufacture of bentwood cheese boxes and butter tubs; he was the president of the Dundas Butter and Cheese Company. His factory was destroyed by fire in 1898. Wolfinger invented cannery machinery.

Wolfinger served on the Woodville Town Board and the Calumet County Board of Supervisors and was a Democrat. In 1895 and 1897, Wolfinger served on the Wisconsin State Assembly. He died at his home in Sherwood, Wisconsin.
