= Benjamin F. Carter =

American politician (1824–1916)

Benjamin F. Carter (November 20, 1824 – April 27, 1916) was a member of the Wisconsin State Assembly and the Wisconsin State Senate.

== Biography ==
Carter was born on November 20, 1824, in Concord, New Hampshire. He settled in Harrison, Calumet County, Wisconsin, in 1866. Carter was a member of the Assembly during the Sessions of 1874 and 1877. A Democrat, he represented the 22nd District in the Senate during the Sessions of 1880 and 1881. He died in Los Angeles on April 27, 1916.
