= Adolph Moeller =

American politician

Adolph Moeller (May 20, 1828 – November 11, 1901) was an American merchant and politician.

Moeller was born in Altona, Duchy of Holstein, at the time under Danish control but also in the German Confederation. Moeller was in the mercantile business. He served in the volunteer army in the First Schleswig War from 1848 to 1851. In 1851, Moeller emigrated to the United States and settled in the town of New Holstein, Calumet County, Wisconsin. He was in the hardware business. In 1855, he served as chairman of the New Holstein Town Board. In 1882, Moeller served in the Wisconsin State Assembly and was a Republican. Moeller died at his home in Milwaukee, Wisconsin.
