= Charlestown, Wisconsin =

- Town
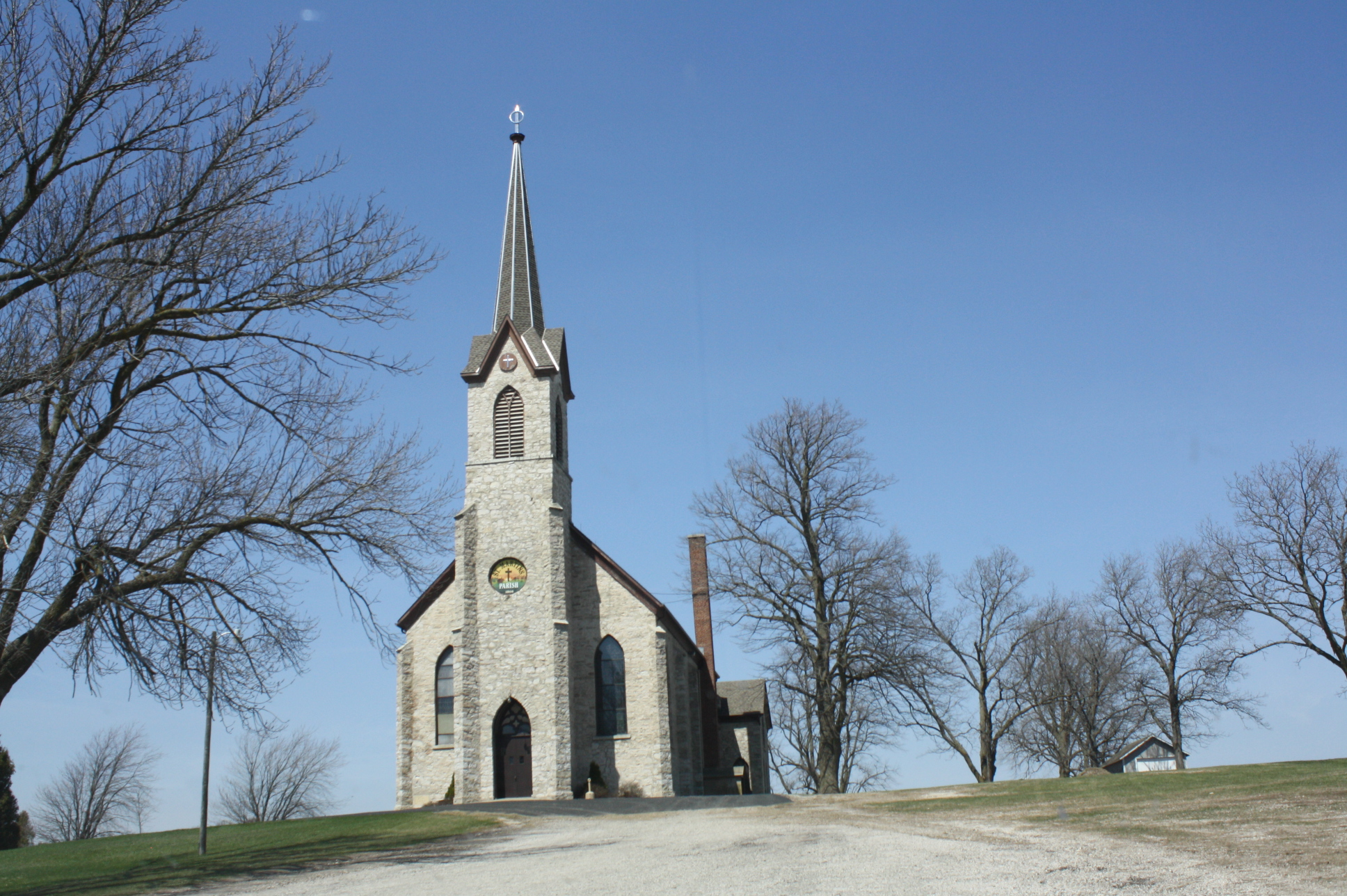
- St. Martin Catholic Church in the town of Charlestown

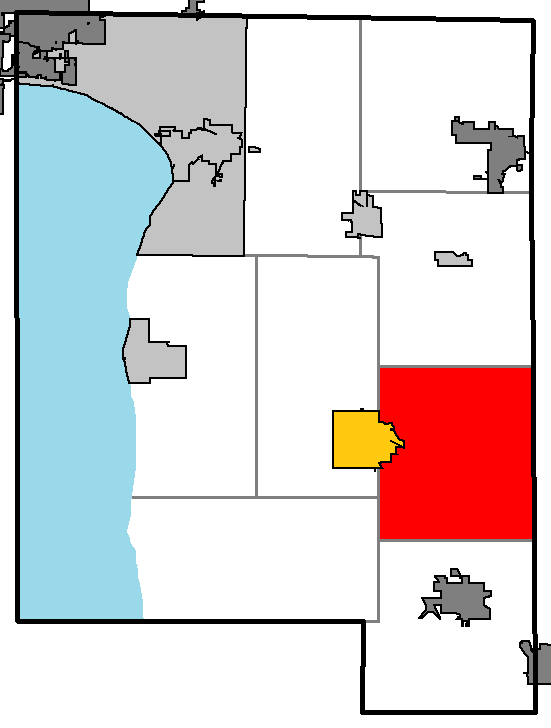
- Location of Charlestown, within Calumet County
- Coordinates: 44°1′4″N 88°6′27″W
- Country: United States
- State: Wisconsin
- County: Calumet

Area
  - Total: 31.7 sq mi (82.2 km^{2})
  - Land: 31.4 sq mi (81.3 km^{2})
  - Water: 0.31 sq mi (0.8 km^{2})
- Elevation: 879 ft (268 m)

Population (2020)
  - Total: 774
  - Density: 24.7/sq mi (9.52/km^{2})
- Time zone: UTC-6 (Central (CST))
  - Summer (DST): UTC-5 (CDT)
- Area code: 920
- FIPS code: 55-14000
- GNIS feature ID: 1582945
- Website: townofcharlestown.com

Charlestown is a town in Calumet County in the U.S. state of Wisconsin. The population was 774 at the 2020 census, a tiny decrease of 775 at the 2010 census. The unincorporated community of Hayton is located in the town.

== Geography ==
The Town of Charlestown is located in southeastern Calumet County. It is bordered by Manitowoc County to the east. The city of Chilton, the Calumet County seat, abuts the west-central border of Charlestown. According to the United States Census Bureau, the town has a total area of 31.7 square miles (82.2 km^{2}), of which 31.4 square miles (81.3 km^{2}) is land and 0.3 square miles (0.8 km^{2}), or 1.03%, is water.

== Demographics ==
As of the census of 2000, there were 789 people, 291 households, and 229 families residing in the town. The population density was 24.8 people per square mile (9.6/km^{2}). There were 300 housing units at an average density of 9.4 per square mile (3.6/km^{2}). The racial makeup of the town was 97.85% White, 0.13% African American, 0.13% Native American, 0.38% Asian, 0.51% from other races, and 1.01% from two or more races. Hispanic or Latino of any race were 1.27% of the population.

There were 291 households, out of which 32.3% had children under the age of 18 living with them, 68.7% were married couples living together, 5.8% had a female householder with no husband present, and 21.3% were non-families. 16.8% of all households were made up of individuals, and 6.9% had someone living alone who was 65 years of age or older. The average household size was 2.71 and the average family size was 3.07.

In the town, the population was spread out, with 26.5% under the age of 18, 6.2% from 18 to 24, 26.2% from 25 to 44, 28.1% from 45 to 64, and 12.9% who were 65 years of age or older. The median age was 40 years. For every 100 females, there were 109.8 males. For every 100 females age 18 and over, there were 110.1 males.

The median income for a household in the town was $52,300, and the median income for a family was $54,659. Males had a median income of $37,500 versus $23,409 for females. The per capita income for the town was $24,715. About 3.1% of families and 4.0% of the population were below the poverty line, including 7.3% of those under age 18 and none of those age 65 or over.

== Notable people ==
- Henry Horst, Wisconsin State Representative and town supervisor
- Otto Luehrs, Wisconsin State Representative and town supervisor
- Carl J. Peik, Wisconsin State Representative and town supervisor
- Harry Steenbock, University of Wisconsin–Madison biochemist who discovered Vitamin A
