= 3D1 =

3D1 may refer to:

- Crivitz Municipal Airport, an airport located in Wisconsin
- Panasonic Lumix DMC-3D1, digital camera made by Panasonic
