= Crivitz, Wisconsin =

Crivitz
- Village
- Nickname: Ellis Junction (Railroad name until 1883)
- Motto: Crivitz, a great place to live, work, and play
- Location of Crivitz in Marinette County, Wisconsin

- Location within Wisconsin
- Coordinates: 45°14′2″N 88°0′25″W
- Country: United States
- State: Wisconsin
- County: Marinette
- Town of Crivitz: September 10, 1883
- Village of Crivitz: 1974

Government
  - Type: Village President and Board of Trustees (6)
  - Village President: Amy Grandaw
  - Village Clerk: Marilynn Padgett

Area
  - Total: 1.64 sq mi (4.25 km^{2})
  - Land: 1.59 sq mi (4.11 km^{2})
  - Water: 0.054 sq mi (0.14 km^{2})
- Elevation: 679 ft (207 m)

Population (2020)
  - Total: 1,093
  - Density: 689/sq mi (266/km^{2})
- Demonym: Wolverines (local sports team)
- Time zone: UTC-6 (Central (CST))
  - Summer (DST): UTC-5 (CDT)
- United States Zip Code: 54114-xxxx
- Area codes: 715 & 534
- FIPS code: 55-17725
- GNIS feature ID: 1563535
- Airport: Crivitz Municipal Airport
- Highways: US 141 (north-south); County W (east-west); County A (northwest)
- Website: Official website

Crivitz is a village in Marinette County, Wisconsin, United States. The population was 1,093 at the 2020 census. It is part of the Marinette, WI–MI Micropolitan Statistical Area.

== History ==
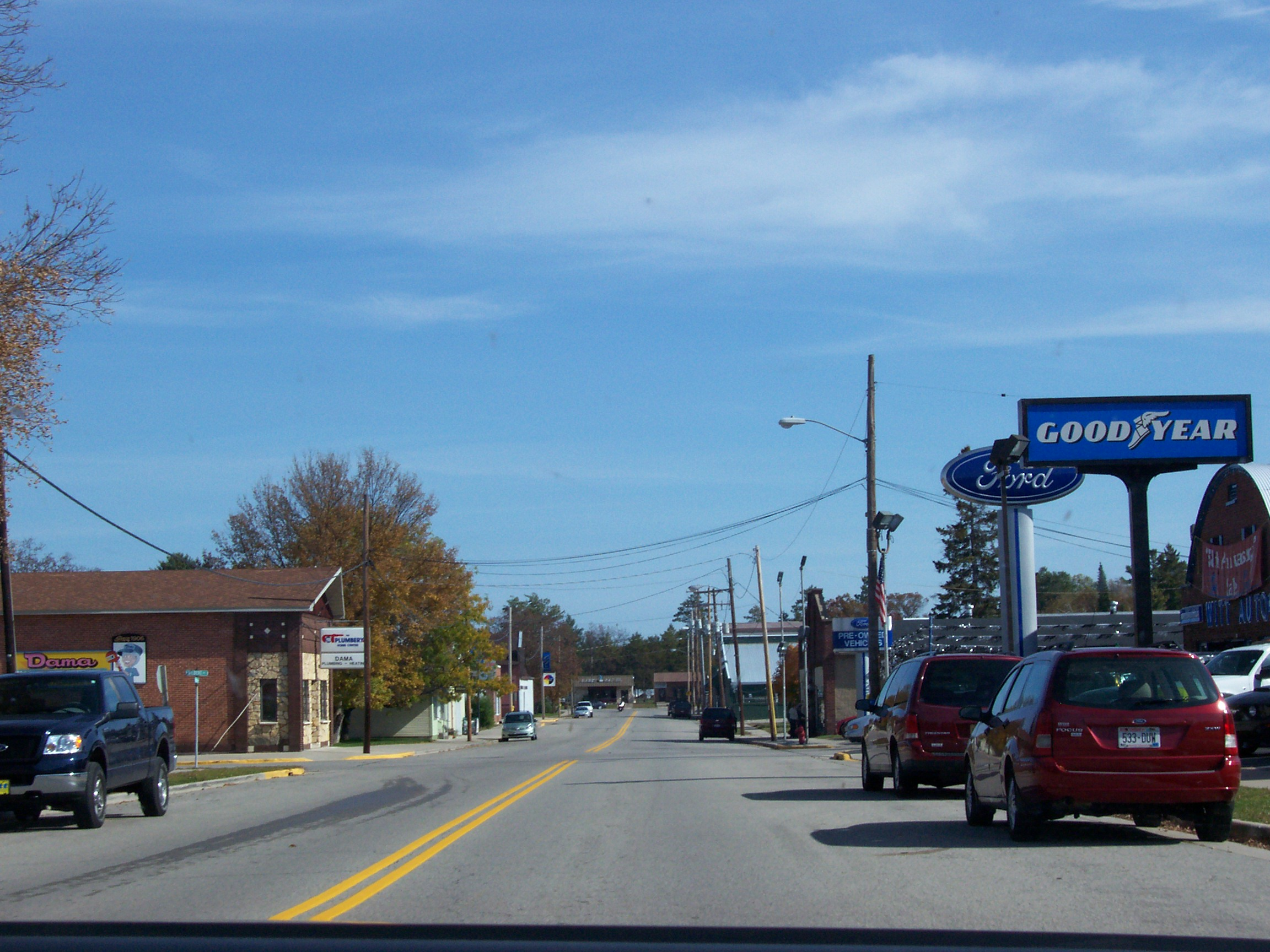
A business district on Main Avenue looking east

Crivitz was surveyed and platted in the summer of 1883. This work was filed with the Register of Deeds in Marinette County on September 10, 1883, by German immigrant Frederick John Bartels, who named the settlement after his home town of Crivitz, Germany.

The demographic character of the Crivitz area was shaped significantly after a typhoid epidemic in 1894, which shut down the sawmills. Hieronymus Zech (1849–1932), a mill operator from Chilton, took over operation of the inactive mills and promoted land sales to Polish immigrants, many of whom relocated from Milwaukee and Chicago. Zech built stores, houses, schools, and roads for the Polish colony. As a result, the local population today is predominantly Polish-American.

Crivitz was a town until 1913, when it was incorporated as the Village of Crivitz. The village hall, originally located at 600 Main Avenue, was later relocated at 800 Main Avenue. The downtown developed along Main Avenue in the 600 to 900 blocks from 1913 to 1924. In 1924 a devastating fire destroyed 22 buildings along the south side of Main Avenue. In 1927, the village was disincorporated and became the Town of Crivitz. The fire, disincorporation, and the start of the Great Depression in 1929 sealed the fate of Crivitz for many years.

A ski hill called Winterset was developed in Crivitz in 1961.

In 1974 Crivitz was once again incorporated as the Village of Crivitz, with the Village Hall at 800 Henriette Avenue. This was quickly followed by improvements in the water-sewer system, electrical system, and highway-transportation system. The village currently operates under its 1974 incorporation with a Village President (executive), a Board of Trustees (legislative), and a Municipal Judge (judicial). Village operations are carried out by the Public Works Department, Water-Sewer Department, Police Department, Fire Department, and Parks Department. In the 1980s the village business district moved to U.S. Highway 141 on the eastern edge of the village, along with the inclusion of Dyer Business Park in 2005. There has been no additional development in the downtown area of the village. The residential area has continued to expand both north and south between the railroad tracks and the Peshtigo River.

== Geography ==
Crivitz is located at 45°14′2″N 88°0′25″W (45.233915, -88.006955).

According to the United States Census Bureau, the village has a total area of 1.64 square miles (4.25 km^{2}), of which 1.59 square miles (4.12 km^{2}) is land and 0.05 square miles (0.13 km^{2}) is water.

== Transportation ==
Crivitz is served by the Crivitz Municipal Airport (FAA LID: 3D1).

The Escanaba and Lake Superior Railroad provides freight rail service to Michigan and Green Bay, Wi.

== Demographics ==
Historical population
Census	Pop.	Note	%±
1980	1,041		—
1990	996		−4.3%
2000	998		0.2%
2010	984		−1.4%
2020	1,093		11.1%
U.S. Decennial Census

=== 2010 census ===
As of the census of 2010, there were 984 people, 452 households, and 235 families living in the village. The population density was 618.9 inhabitants per square mile (239.0/km^{2}). There were 533 housing units at an average density of 335.2 per square mile (129.4/km^{2}). The racial makeup of the village was 97.4% White, 0.3% African American, 0.8% Native American, and 1.5% from two or more races. Hispanic or Latino people of any race were 0.8% of the population.

There were 452 households, of which 23.5% had children under the age of 18 living with them, 38.3% were married couples living together, 10.2% had a female householder with no husband present, 3.5% had a male householder with no wife present, and 48.0% were non-families. 41.4% of all households were made up of individuals, and 21.6% had someone living alone who was 65 years of age or older. The average household size was 2.01 and the average family size was 2.73.

The median age in the village was 49 years. 18.9% of residents were under the age of 18; 5.6% were between the ages of 18 and 24; 20.6% were from 25 to 44; 24.9% were from 45 to 64; and 30.2% were 65 years of age or older. The gender makeup of the village was 46.2% male and 53.8% female.

=== 2000 census ===
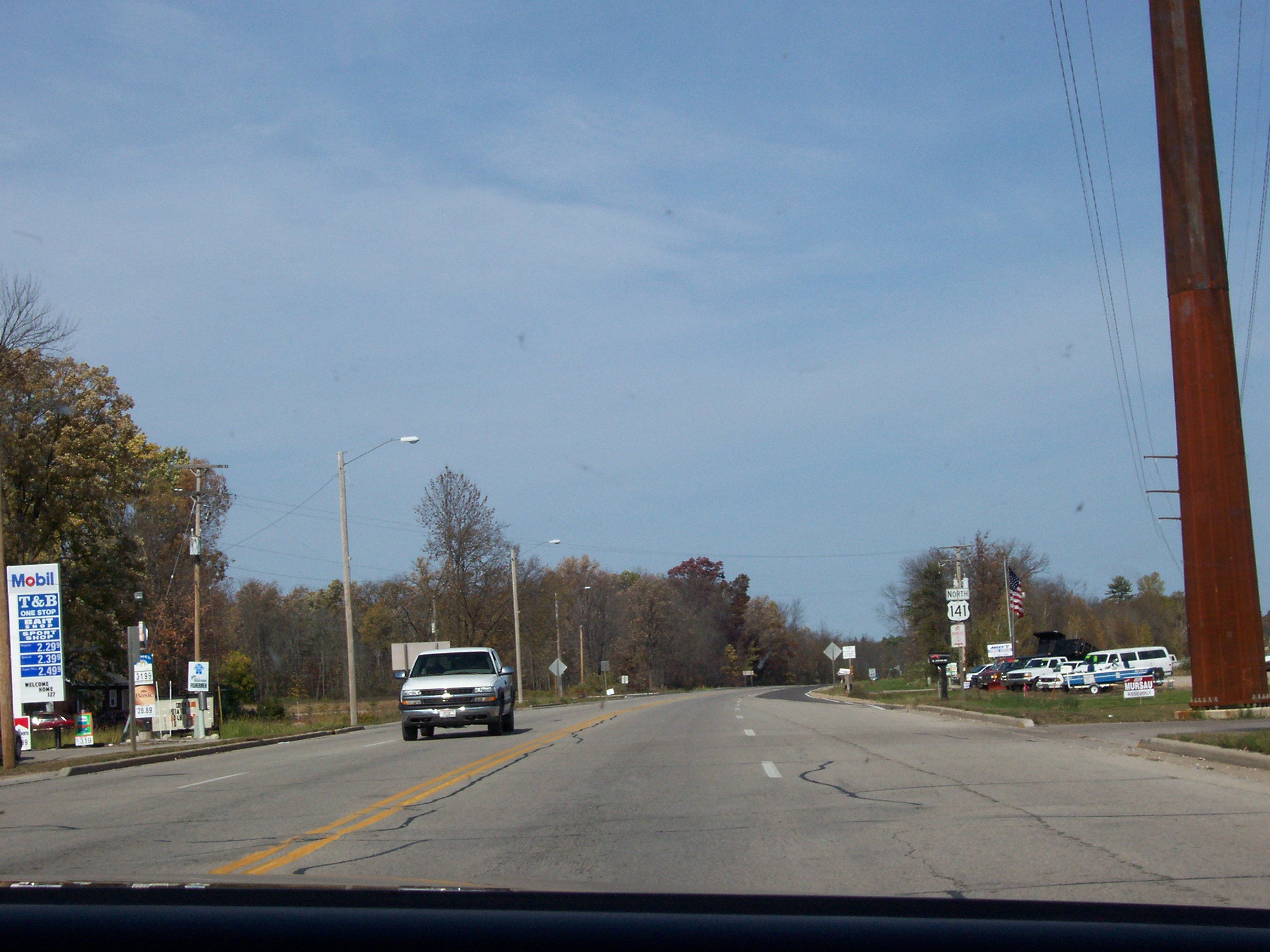
North edge of Crivitz on U.S. Route 141 looking north

As of the census of 2000, there were 998 people, 406 households, and 239 families living in the village. The population density was 657.1 inhabitants per square mile (253.7/km^{2}). There were 457 housing units at an average density of 300.9 per square mile (116.2/km^{2}). The racial makeup of the village was 96.99% White, 0.20% African American, 0.30% Native American, 0.20% Asian, 0.90% from other races, and 1.40% from two or more races. Hispanic or Latino people of any race were 1.10% of the population.

There were 406 households, out of which 29.3% had children under the age of 18 living with them, 44.3% were married couples living together, 11.1% had a female householder with no husband present, and 41.1% were non-families. 36.0% of all households were made up of individuals, and 21.4% had someone living alone who was 65 years of age or older. The average household size was 2.23 and the average family size was 2.90.

In the village, the population was spread out, with 23.1% under the age of 18, 6.5% from 18 to 24, 25.1% from 25 to 44, 20.1% from 45 to 64, and 25.2% who were 65 years of age or older. The median age was 41 years. For every 100 females, there were 80.1 males. For every 100 females age 18 and over, there were 76.3 males.

The median income for a household in the village was $89,250, and the median income for a family was $76,464. Males had a median income of $54,646 versus $20,046 for females. The per capita income for the village was $13,405. About 12.2% of families and 16.8% of the population were below the poverty line, including 24.3% of those under age 18 and 14.4% of those age 65 or over.

== Economy ==
The tourism industry and outdoor activities such as fishing, snowmobiling, and hunting are important to the Crivitz economy. Several area businesses specialize in outdoor activities, such as hunting, fishing, snowmobiling, whitewater rafting, tubing, ATV trail upkeep, and boat rental services.

== Notable residents ==
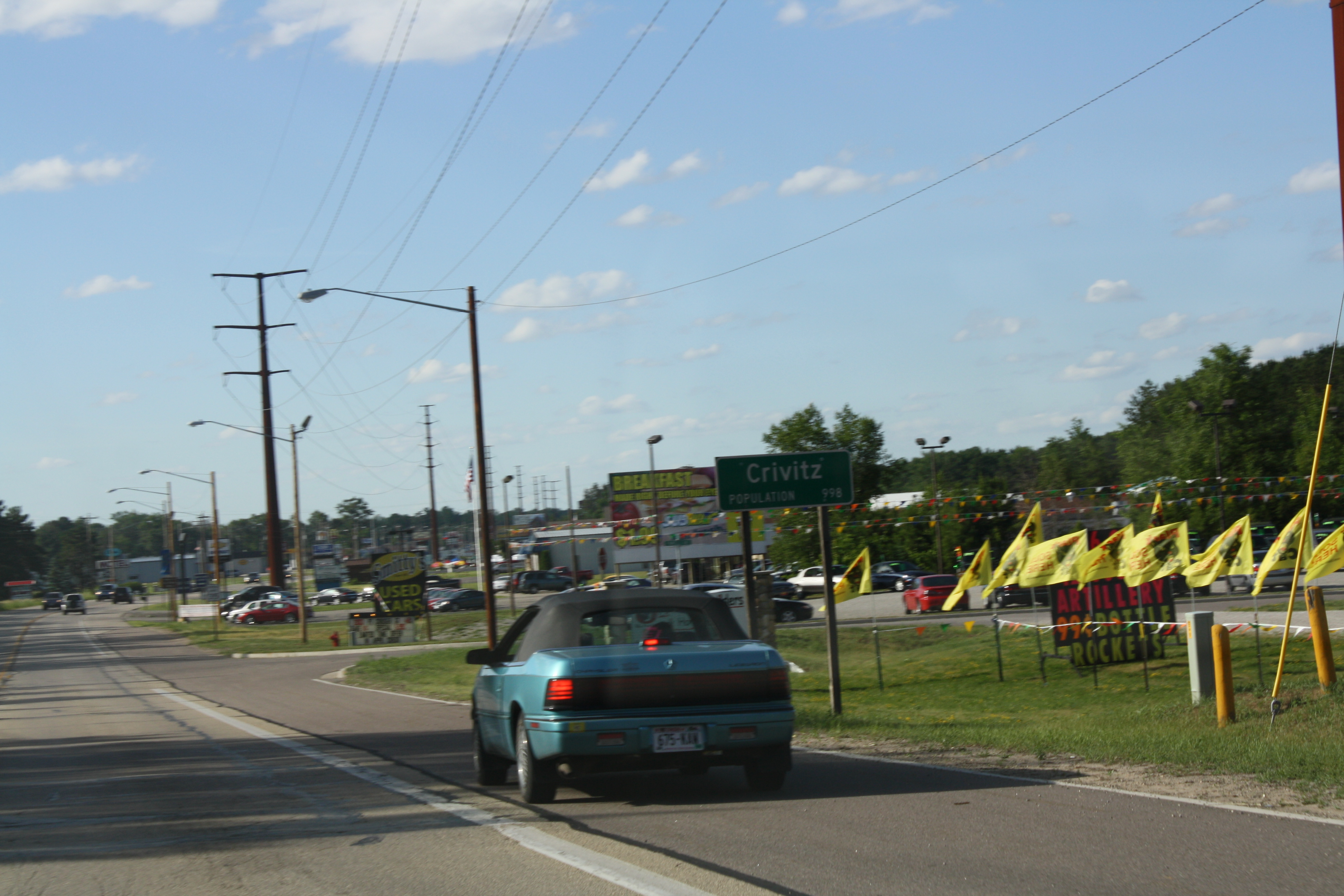
Welcome sign

- Pete Banaszak, NFL player and running back for the Oakland Raiders
- Frank L. Kersten, Wisconsin State Representative
- Julius La Rosa, singer, lived in Crivitz briefly, at the end of his life
- Trixie Mattel, (Brian Firkus) Drag queen and musician lived in Crivitz
- Richard P. Matty, Wisconsin State Representative

== See also ==
- List of villages in Wisconsin
