= Kaytee =

Kaytee Products, Inc.
- Formerly: Knauf & Tesch, K & T
- Industry: Pet food and supplies
- Founded: 1866
- Headquarters: Chilton, Wisconsin, U.S.
- Key people: Nicholas W. Knauf; William N. Knauf; Frank Tesch; William Engler Senior.; William Engler Junior.
- Products: bird seed, pet food, cages, bedding, feeders
- Owner: Central Garden & Pet

Kaytee is a company based in Chilton, Wisconsin and United States. It is an international supplier of bird seed.

== History ==
Nicholas W. Knauf and Peter Juckem founded a grain elevator, on East Main Street in Chilton in 1866. At age 19, William N. Knauf became co-owner with Frank Tesch when Nicholas W. Knauf died. They took the company name from their initials, K & T. They built a gristmill and general store to sell seeds to farmers. They used the 1872 railroad to ship barley and oats to markets; which led to selling barley to Milwaukee breweries. In 1920, the company became a national supplier of peas to be used for pigeon feed. It expanded into making feed for birds and other small animals, becoming the first commercial supplier of wild bird seed in 1955.

William Engler Sr., a long-term employee and son-in-law of William N. Knauf, purchased the company in 1964 and renamed it Kaytee Products, Inc. His son, Bill Engler Jr., took over the company in 1982. Bill Engler Jr. was named the Small Business Person of the Year in 1993 by United States President Bill Clinton. As of 1993, Kaytee had 365 employees and annual sales of about $70 million. At that time, it also held about 1300 exotic bird species in an aviary in Chilton.

Engler sold the company to Central Garden & Pet in 1997. They renamed the company Central Avian & Small Animal and continued to market products under the Kaytee brand.

== Controversy ==
In April 2012, Kaytee recalled five lots of parrot hand-feeding formula due to excessive vitamin D.

In February 2013, Kaytee recalled a number of treat mixes due to reports from a parsley supplier of salmonella contamination. They recalled the mixes to comply with FDA regulation, but it was later found that none of the treat mixes recalled contained salmonella.
