= Frank L. Kersten =

American politician

Frank L. Kersten (January 5, 1870 – April 5, 1950) was an American businessman and politician.

Born in Chilton, Wisconsin, Kersten took a commercial course at the Jesuit college in Prairie du Chien, Wisconsin. Kersten was a clerk in a general store in Antigo, Wisconsin and in Chilton, Wisconsin. He was a clerk in the United States Land Office in Salt Lake City, Utah. Kersten was in the general mercantile and real estate business in Crivitz, Wisconsin. Kersten was a Republican. He served as treasurer and chairman of the Town of Stephenson, Wisconsin and on the Crivitz Village Board. Kersten served on the Marinette County, Wisconsin Board of Supervisors. In 1925, Kersten served in the Wisconsin State Assembly. After he left office, Kersten was chief of the Wisconsin state oil inspectors. Kersten died in Marinette, Wisconsin.
