= Gravity Park USA =

- Location: Chilton, Wisconsin, United States
- Coordinates: 44°3′30.41″N 88°10′0.27″W
- Owner: Bob Schneider
- Opened: 1999
- Website: gravityparkusa.com

Stock Car oval
- Surface: dirt
- Length: 0.33 miles (0.54 km)

Gravity Park USA is an off-road and Stock car racing facility near Chilton, Wisconsin in the Town of Chilton. It hosts weekly motocross races between April and October, featuring off-road trucks and quads. It also has a 1/3 mile stock car dirt oval which was enhanced in the middle of 2017. The world record for the greatest length traveled on a motocross track during 24 hours was set at the track.

== History ==
Gravity Park opened in 1999 as a kart racing facility.

=== Motocross / snocross track ===
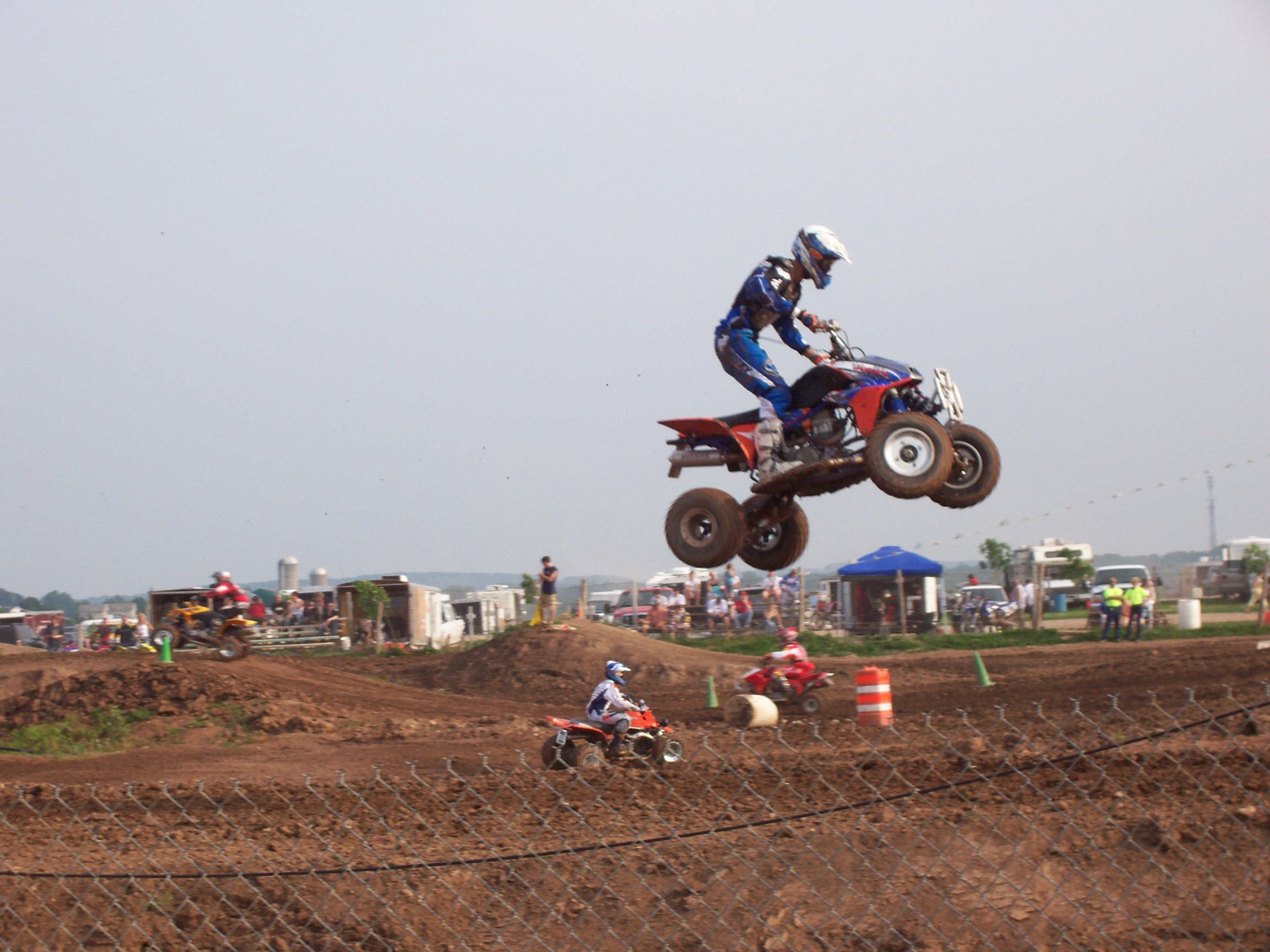
A quad racing at Gravity Park USA in 2006

Gravity Park USA opened in 2000. It was named Gravity Park until it was renovated in 2005. When it originally opened, it held snocross races in the North American winter. Flat track races were also held on an on-site dirt oval for several years before its 2017 renovation. The track hosted the 2005 Kraft Amateur Stadiumcross Championship; 250 drivers competed in the event.

The track has been used for special touring events, such as Badger State Quad Championship quad races. The track has also been used for SCCA RallyCross and mud bogging.

=== Stock car oval ===
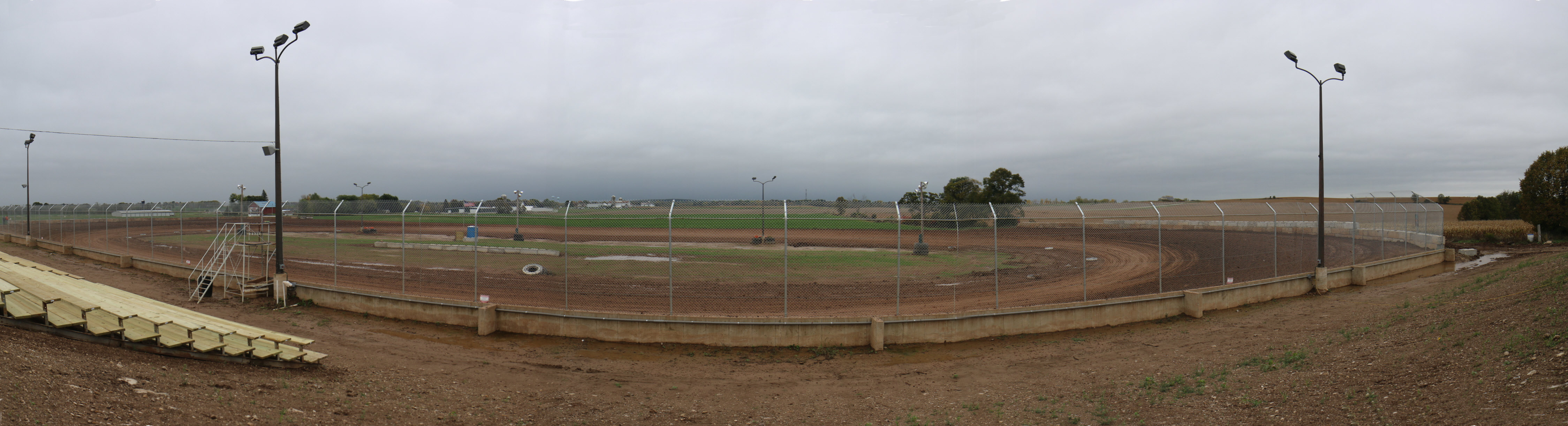
Panorama for Gravity Park Speedway

The track has oval track at the edge of the site. A front-stretch wall was built in 2012. Owner Bob Schneider decided to not open a stock car track since he felt there were enough ovals operating in the area at the time. Race tracks in Manitowoc and Oshkosh closed and he decided to work on the oval in 2017. The oval's use was grandfathered in by the town board in May 2017. New lights, concrete walls, retaining fences, and grandstands were built at the oval over the middle of 2017. The oval measures 1/3 mile around the outside. A stock car "Mini-Invitational" was scheduled for the track's first stock car races on October 5, 6, and 7. The races rained out and were rescheduled for a one day show on the following Saturday (October 14). The day was also rained out and the inaugural stock car event was cancelled.

Over the winter, a Friday night weekly racing schedule of six classes was developed (modified, stock car, sport modified, grand national, street stock, and 4 cylinder). The first event was scheduled for May 4, 2018 but it was rained out. A non-points opening event was scheduled for the following day. Two touring series are part of the inaugural season along with an end-of-season special event weekend.

== World record ==
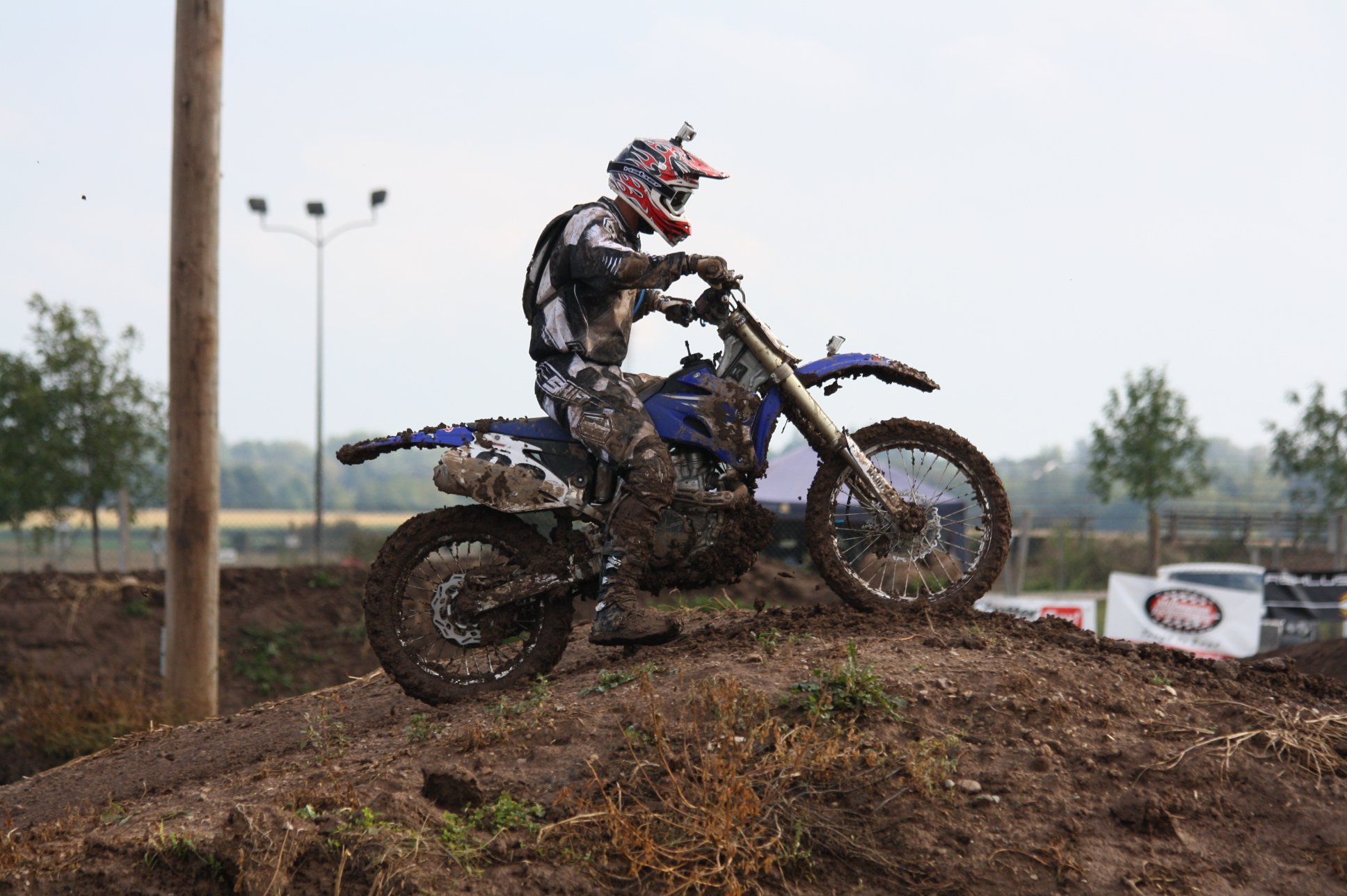
Prichard during his world record attempt

On September 11 to 12, 2010, motocycle racer Perry Prichard attempted to break a world record at Gravity Park. He contacted the Guinness World Records to certify the record, and the attempt was to set "the most continuous laps on a motocross bike on a motocross track by an individual in 24 hours". The record attempt was a benefit for Haitians. He was allowed a 5-minute break each hour to refuel, refresh, and bike repairs. Guinness certified the record 426.96 km (265.3 mi) distance as the "Greatest distance on a motocross in 24 hours (individual)".

When asked why he did the record attempt, he replied "when I sat down to think of what I could do to raise money for Haiti, the first thoughts through my head were NOT to sell pizzas, Girl Scout cookies or anything like that, it was about, I love to ride motorcycles and how can I turn that passion into raising money?"

== Amenities ==
The track has a sports bar and lounge, called the Killsnake Clubhouse, that is open while there is racing on the track. It features a Friday night fish fry.

== Images ==
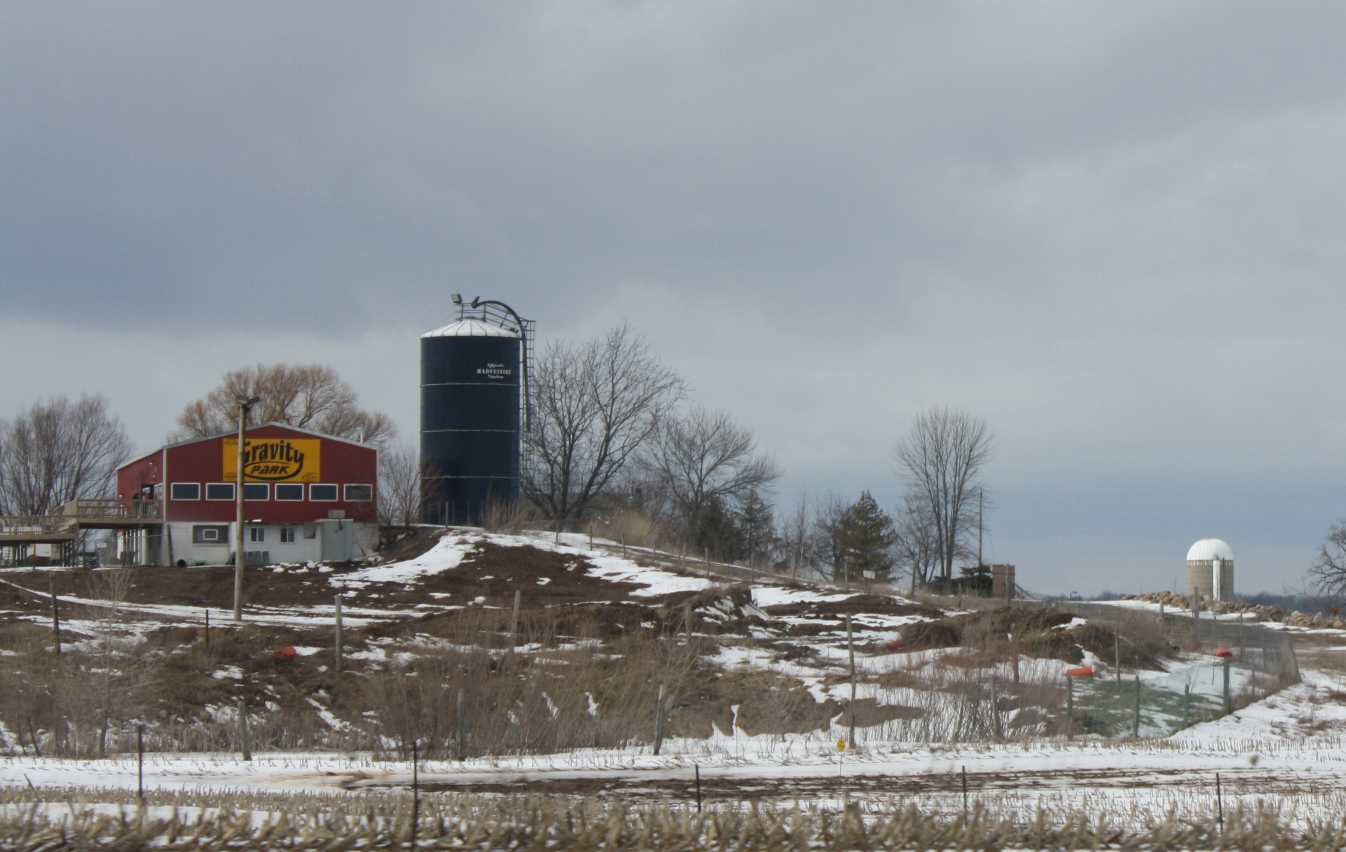
Motocross panorama

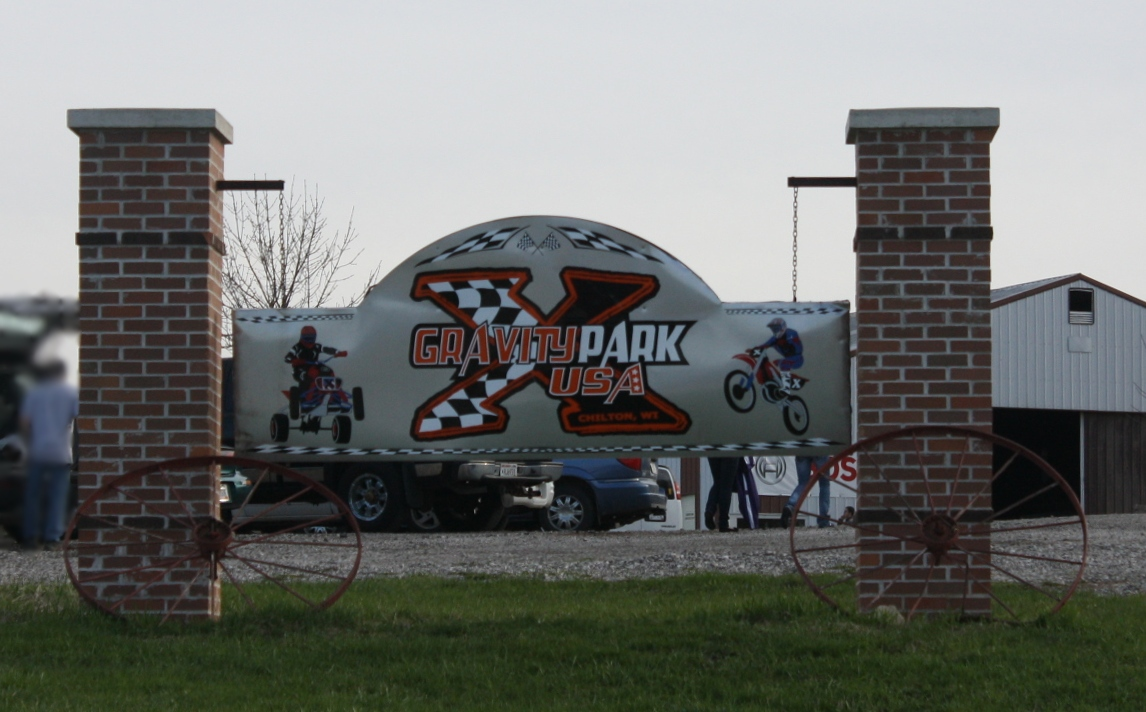
Sign

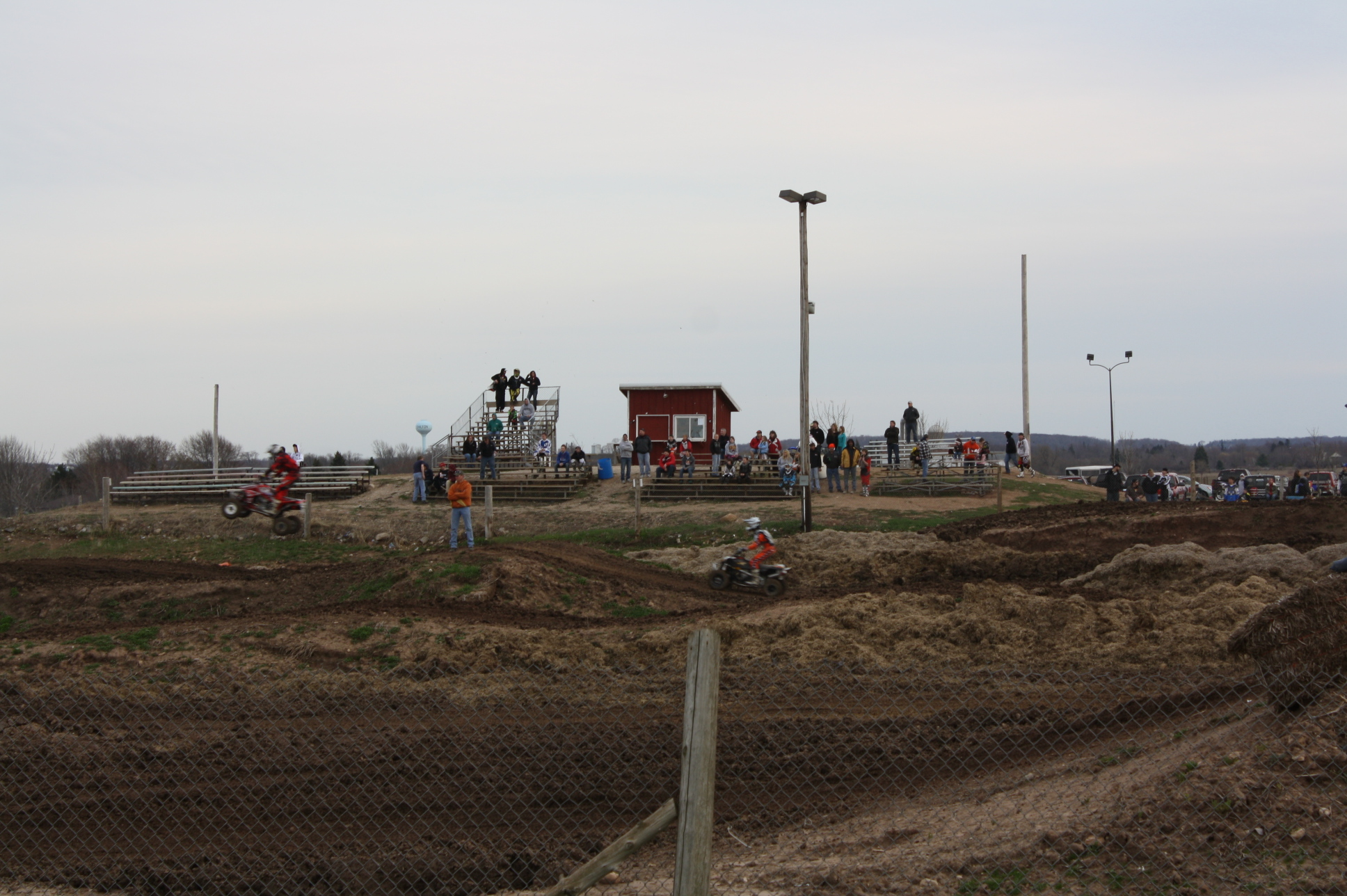
Segments of the motocross track
