= Panasonic Lumix DMC-3D1 =

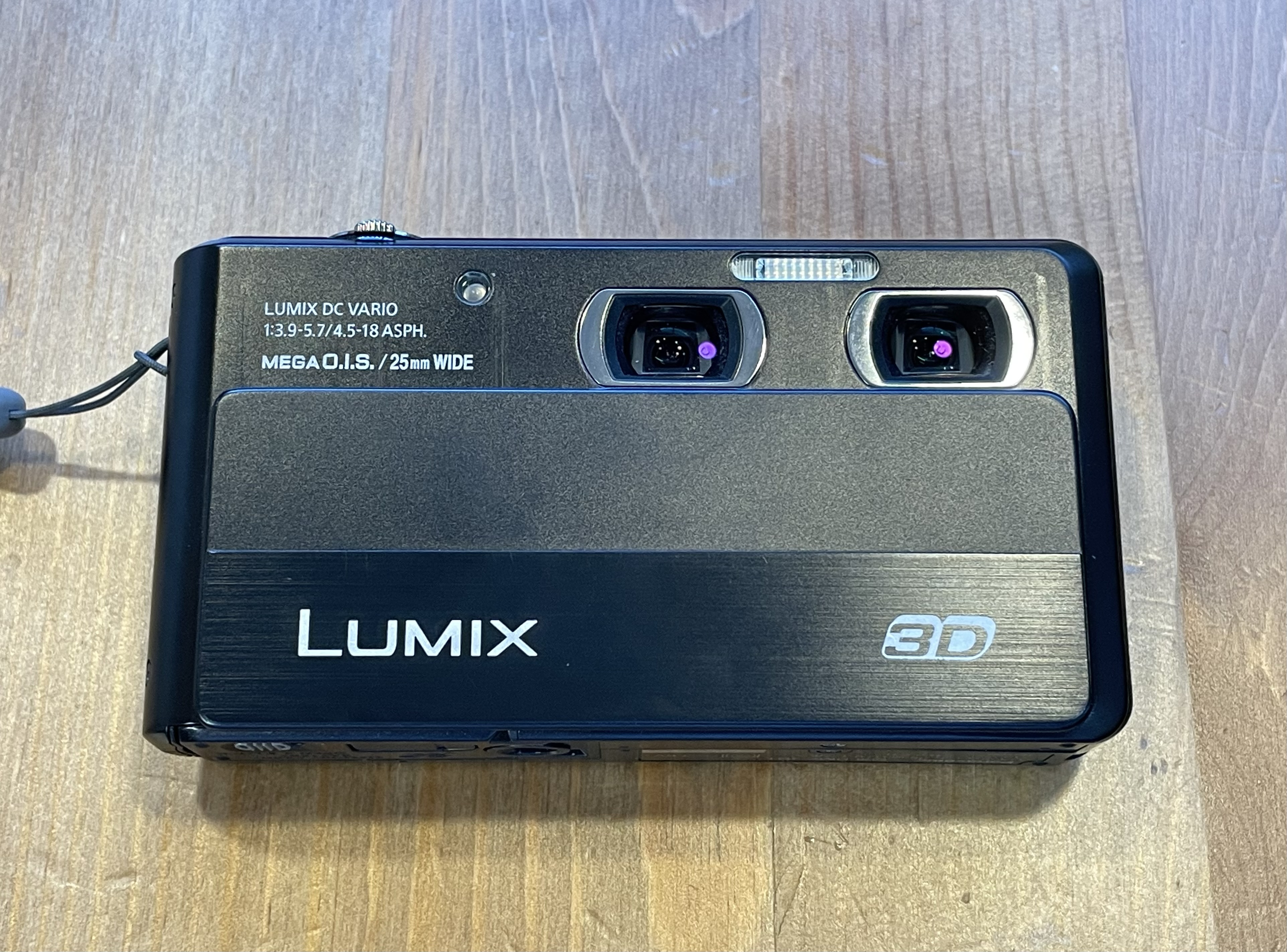

Overview
- Maker: Panasonic Lumix
- Type: Compact

Lens
- Lens mount: LUMIX DC VARIO x2
- F-numbers: 3.9 - 5.7

Sensor/medium
- Sensor type: MOS
- Sensor size: 12.1 megapixels
- Storage media: SD, SDHC, SDXC

Focusing
- Focus modes: Normal, AF Macro, Zoom Macro (2D) Normal (3D)
- Focus areas: Normal: Wide 50 cm - infinity / Tele 100 cm - infinity / Macro / Intelligent Auto / Motion Picture: Wide 5 cm - infinity / Tele 100 cm - infinity (2D) Normal: Wide 50 cm - infinity / Tele 100 cm - infinity (3D)

Flash
- Flash: built-in

Shutter
- Frame rate: 2-8
- Shutter speeds: 8 - 1/1300

General
- LCD screen: 3.5" TFT Full Touch Screen LCD
- Battery: Li-ion Battery Pack (3.6V, Minimum:895mAh)
- Dimensions: 108.0×58.5×24.1 mm (4.25×2.30×0.95 in)
- Weight: 171 g (6 oz) without Battery and SD Memory Card

Panasonic Lumix DMC-3D1 is a digital camera by Panasonic Lumix. The highest-resolution pictures it records is 12.1 megapixels, through its 25mm Lumix DC VARIO x2.

== Property ==
- Stabilized 2-Lens System, 25mm Wide
- 4X Zoom with MEGA O.I.S.
- 3D and 2D Video and Stills with Dual Shooting Options
- 3.5-inch Touch Enabled LCD
- 1080/60i HD Video
