= Crivitz Municipal Airport =

Airport in Wisconsin, United States

- IATA: none; ICAO: none; FAA LID: 3D1

Summary
- Airport type: Public
- Owner: Town of Stephenson
- Serves: Crivitz, Wisconsin
- Opened: April 1948
- Time zone: CST (UTC−06:00)
  - Summer (DST): CDT (UTC−05:00)
- Elevation AMSL: 735 ft (224 m)
- Coordinates: 45°12′53″N 088°4′24″W

Map
- Location of airport in Wisconsin 3D1 (the United States)

Runways
Direction	Length		Surface
Direction	ft	m	Surface
18/36	2,164	660	Asphalt
9/27	2,545	776	Turf

Statistics
- Aircraft operations (2023): 200
- Based aircraft (2024): 0
- Source: Federal Aviation Administration

Crivitz Municipal Airport, (FAA LID: 3D1) is a city owned public use airport located 3 miles (5 km) southwest of the central business district of Crivitz, Wisconsin, a city in Marinette County, Wisconsin, United States. It is included in the Federal Aviation Administration (FAA) National Plan of Integrated Airport Systems for 2025–2029, in which it is categorized as an unclassified general aviation facility.

Although most airports in the United States use the same three-letter location identifier for the FAA and International Air Transport Association (IATA), this airport is assigned 3D1 by the FAA but has no designation from the IATA.

== Facilities and aircraft ==
Crivitz Municipal Airport covers an area of 147 acres (60 ha) at an elevation of 735 feet (224 m) above mean sea level. It has two runways: 18/36 is 2,164 by 60 feet (660 x 18 m) with an asphalt surface and 9/27 is 2,545 by 80 feet (776 x 24 m) with a turf surface.

For the 12-month period ending August 4, 2023, the airport had 200 aircraft operations: 100% general aviation. In August 2024, there were no aircraft based at this airport.

== See also ==
- List of airports in Wisconsin
