= Chilton, Wisconsin =

- City
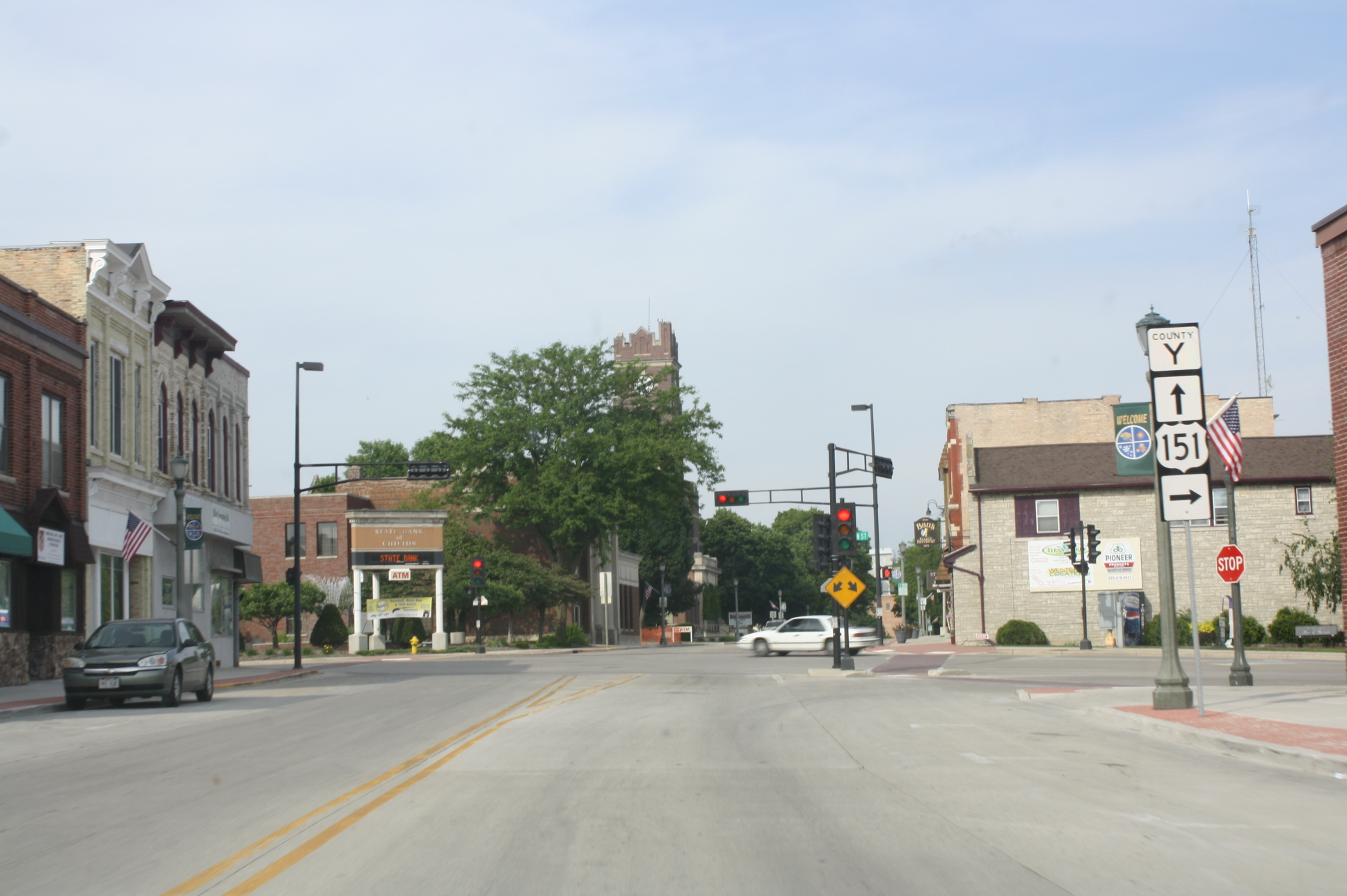

- Location of Chilton in Calumet County, Wisconsin.

- Location within Wisconsin Location within the United States
- Coordinates: 44°1′51″N 88°9′31″W
- Country: United States
- State: Wisconsin
- County: Calumet

Area
  - Total: 4.02 sq mi (10.42 km^{2})
  - Land: 3.98 sq mi (10.30 km^{2})
  - Water: 0.046 sq mi (0.12 km^{2})
- Elevation: 902 ft (275 m)

Population (2020)
  - Total: 4,080
  - Estimate (2024): 3,720
  - Density: 970.6/sq mi (374.74/km^{2})
- Time zone: UTC-6 (Central (CST))
  - Summer (DST): UTC-5 (CDT)
- ZIP Code: 53014
- Area code: 920
- FIPS code: 55-14475
- GNIS feature ID: 1563022
- Website: chiltonwi.gov

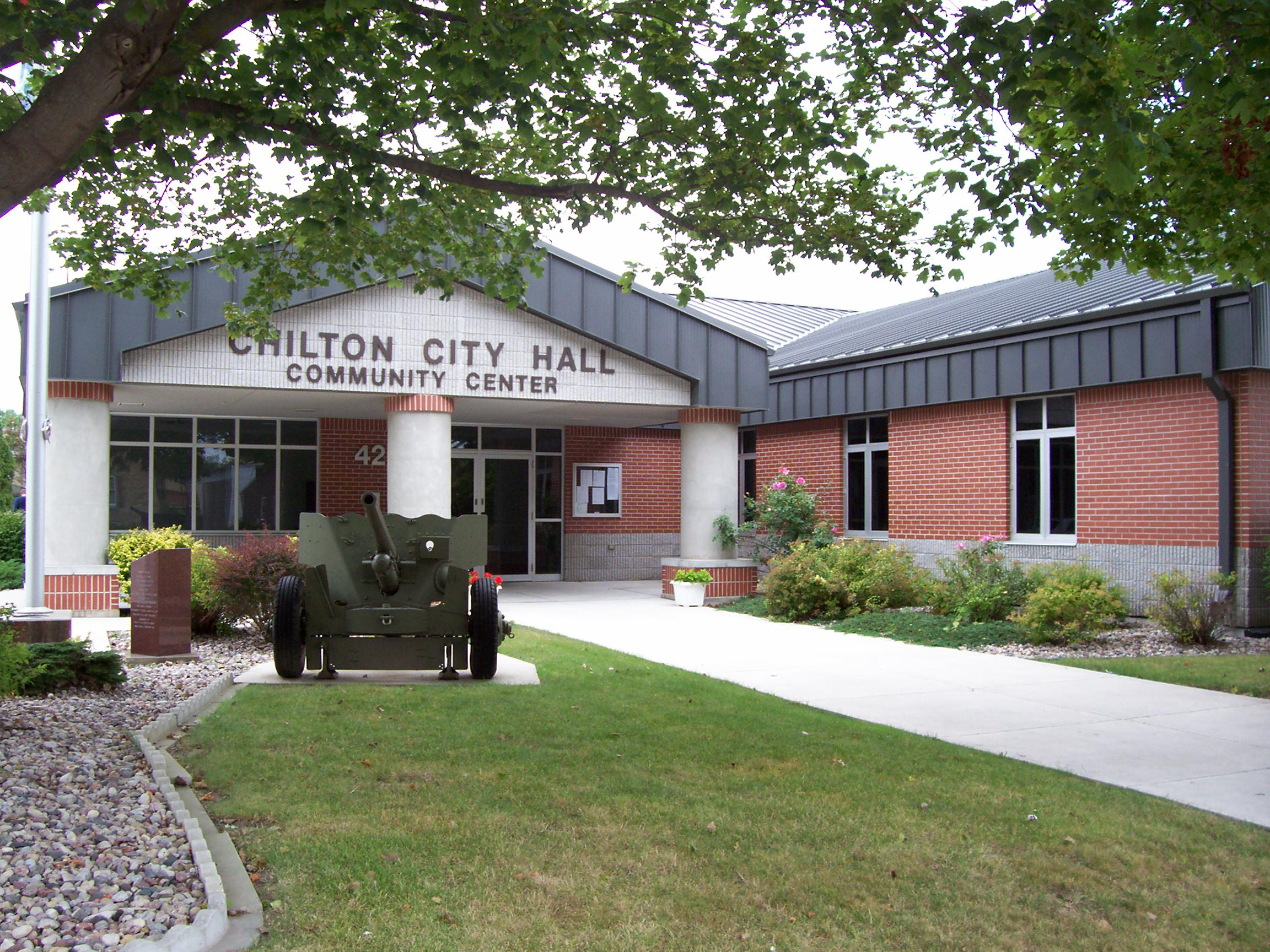
Chilton Community Center

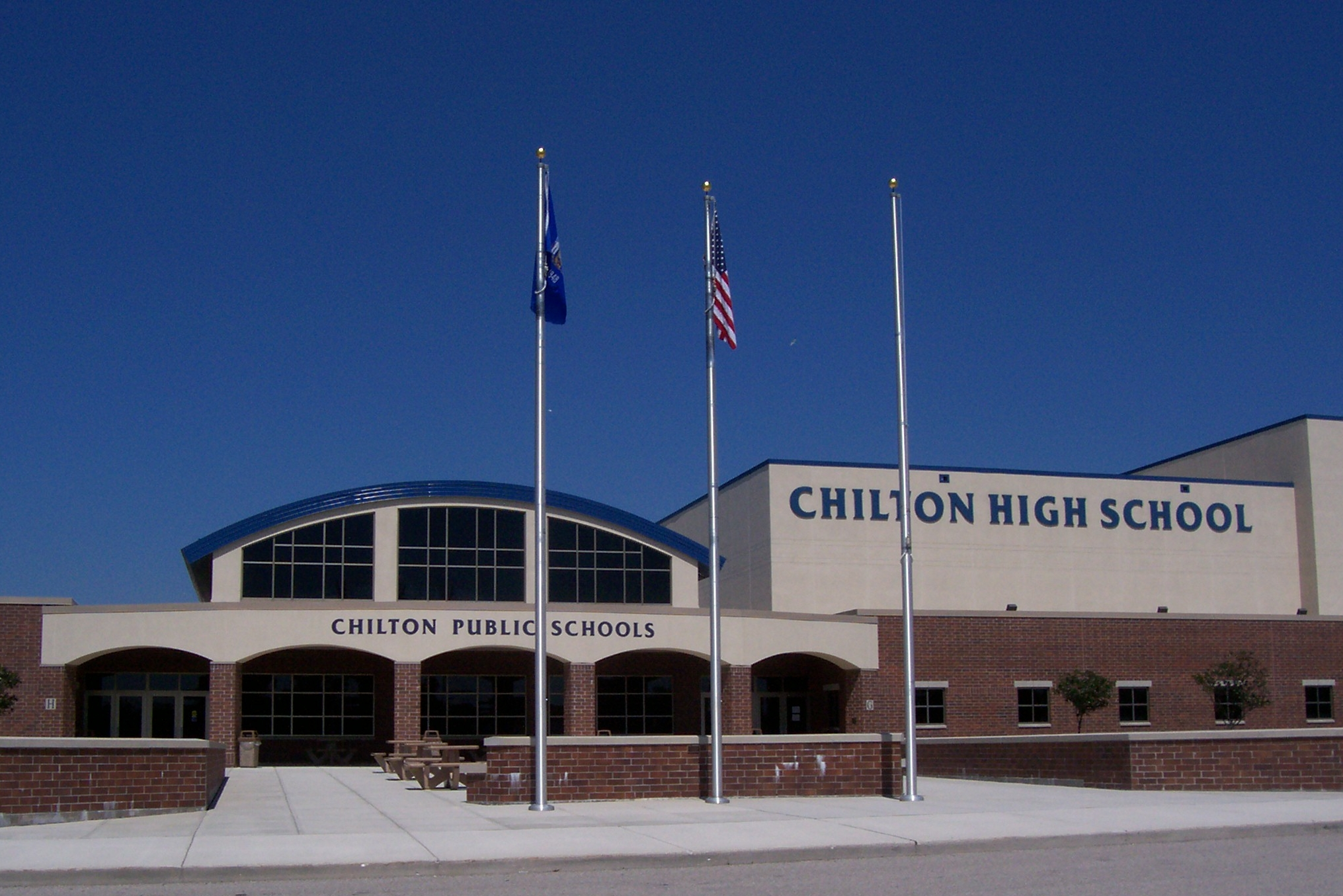
Chilton High School

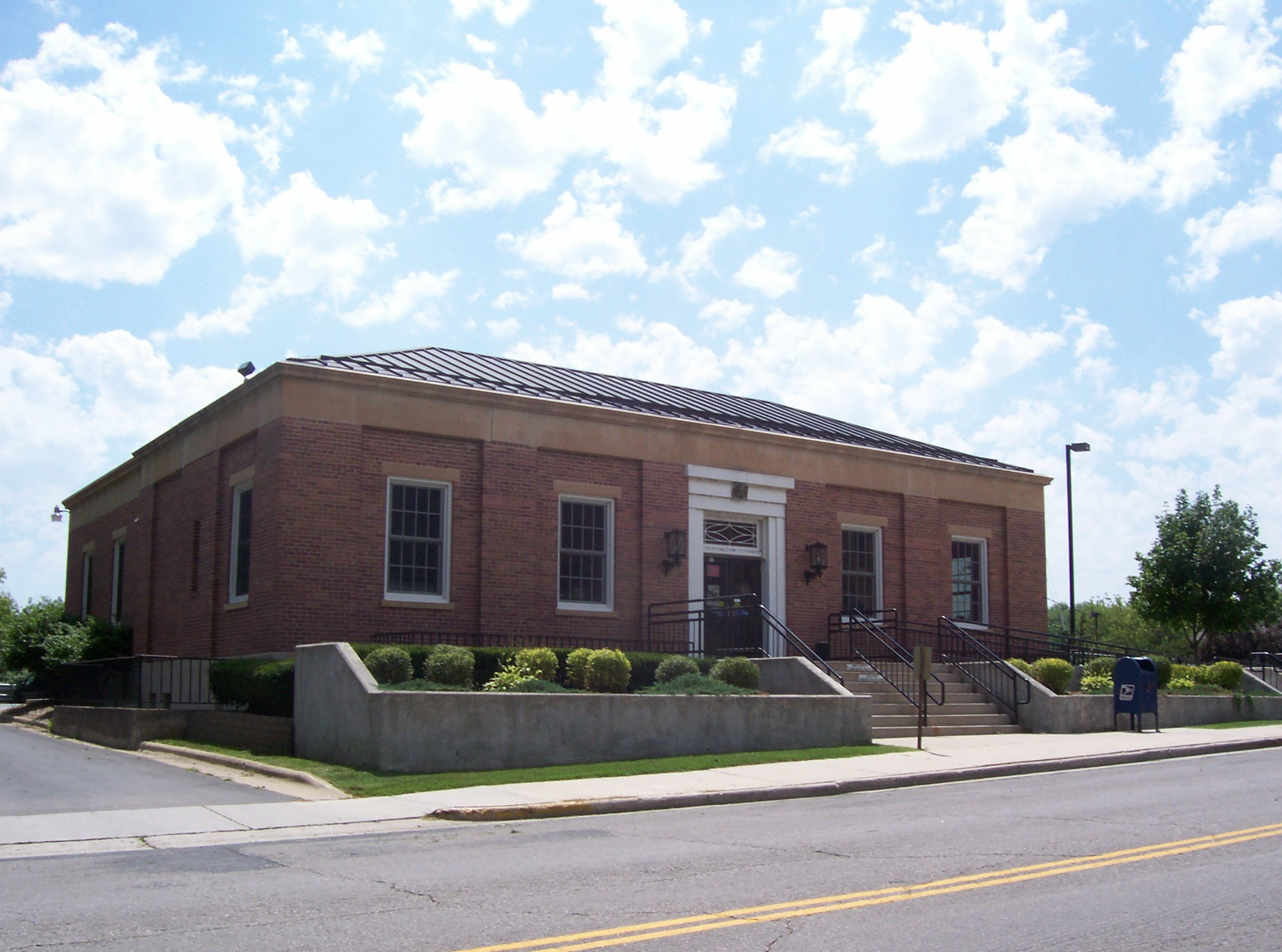
Chilton Post Office

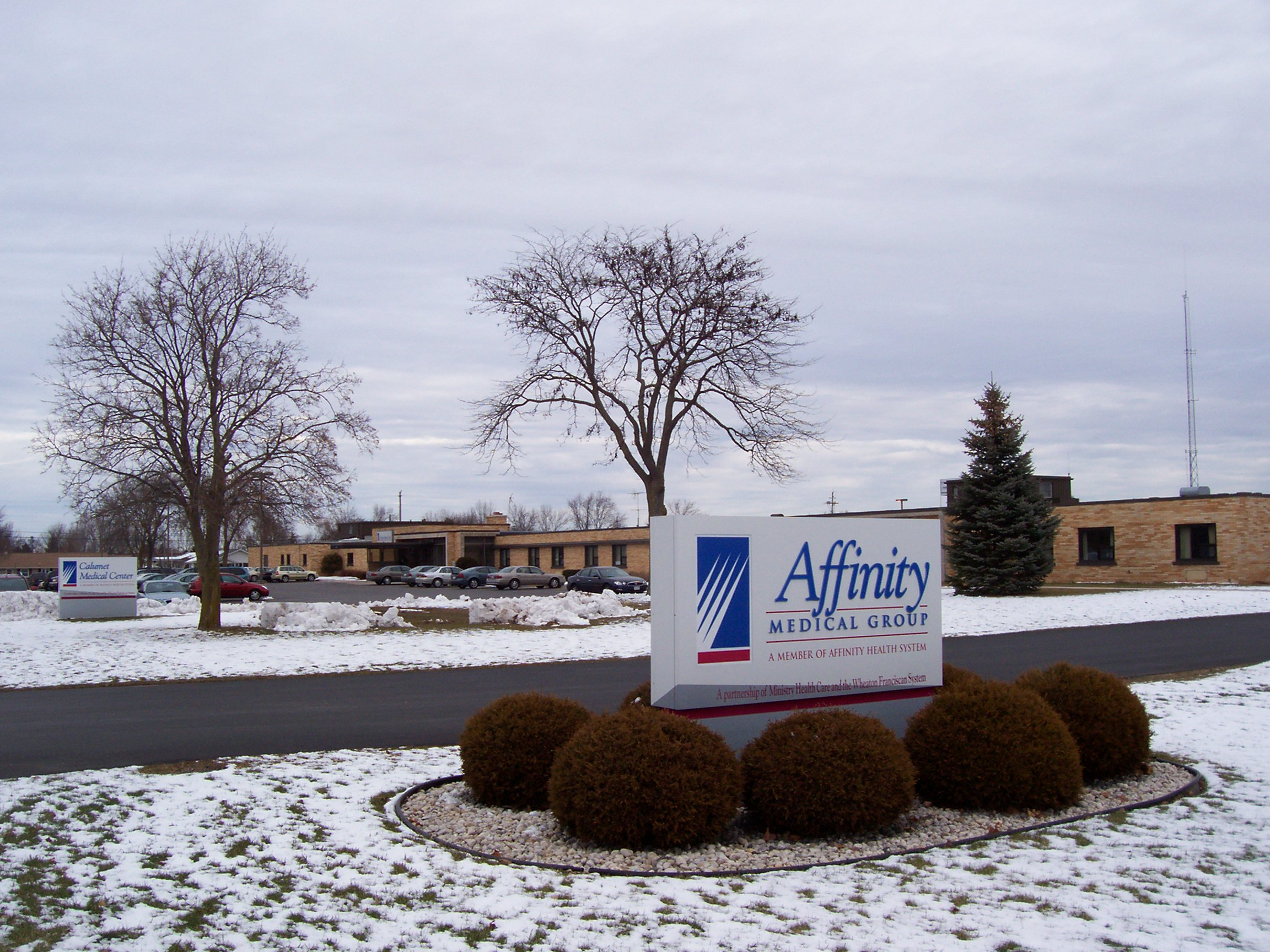
Calumet Medical Center

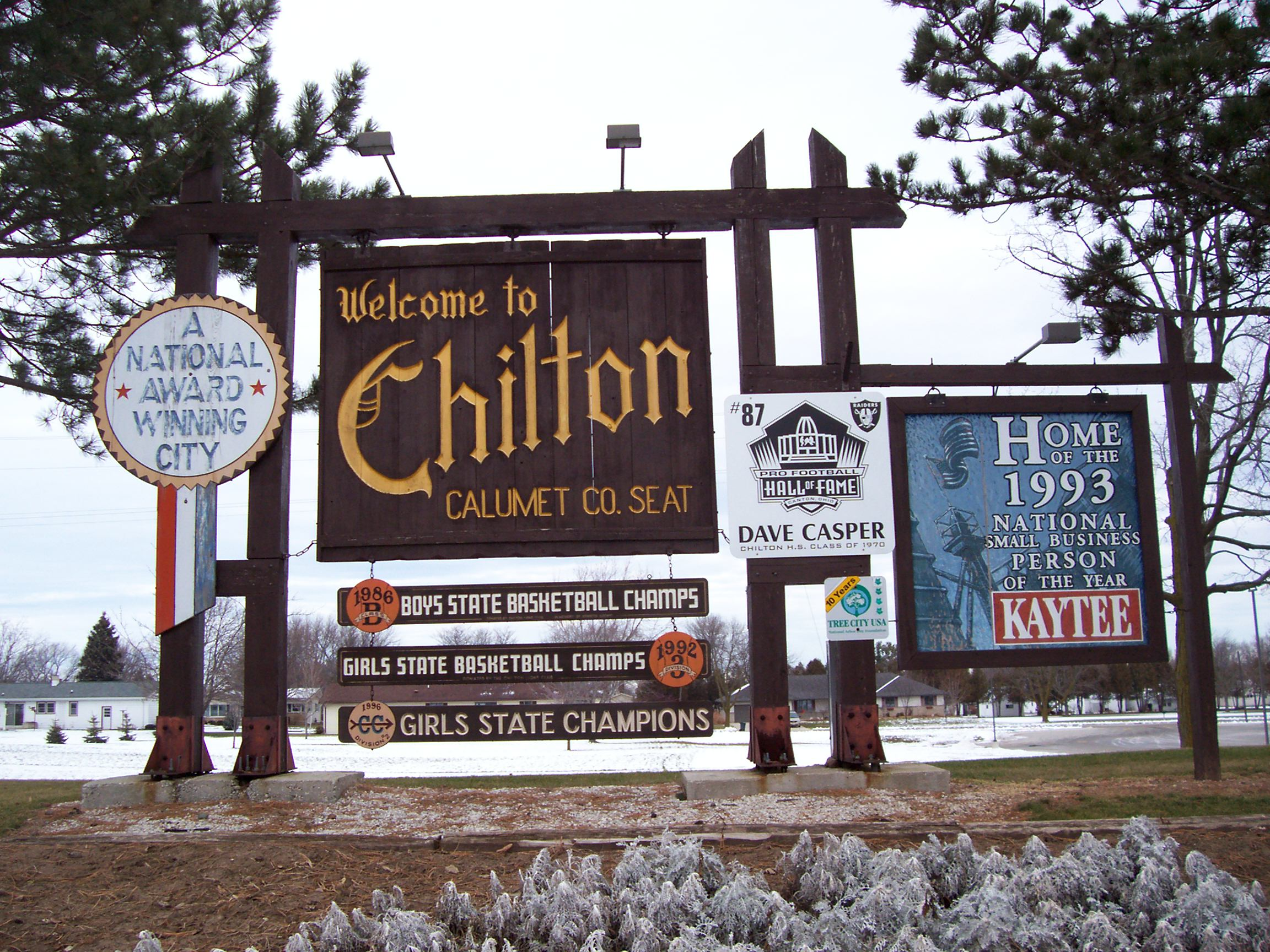
Welcome sign in Klinkner Park

Chilton is a city in and county seat of Calumet County in the U.S. state of Wisconsin. The population was 3,720 as of 2024. The city is partially within the Town of Chilton.

== History ==
The first residents of Chilton were African-American former slave Moses Stanton and his Native-American wife, Catherine, who arrived in January 1845. The city formed around his saw mill and a grist mill a few years later.

The village was originally called Stantonville. John Marygold bought the place in 1852 and, according to legend, called it "Chilington," referring to Chillington Hall in England. He sent a verbal message to have the name change recorded in Stockbridge, then the county seat. Because the middle ing in the name was accidentally omitted, the municipality was recorded as Chilton.

An alternative explanation for the name is that it was a reference to one of two villages called Chilton near Oxford, England. Both are located on the edge of the Chiltern Hills, a limestone escarpment similar to the Niagara Escarpment near Chilton, Wisconsin. "Chilt," when used in a place name in England, is thought to have derived from the Old English word for chalk or limestone ("cealc"), while "ton" derives from the Old English word for town ("tun"). Between 1838-1852, when John Marygold lived in England, all records of births, marriages and deaths of people named Marygold were concentrated around just three cities: Marygold's hometown of Birmingham (18 records), Oxford (10 records), and London (7 records). Oxford being just 80 miles from Birmingham, it's plausible that Marygold had family members there and knew of the two nearby Chiltons.

The county seat was changed to Chilton in December 1853 and the county's first courthouse was built. Most Chilton residents in the 19th century had German heritage.

=== Gravesville ===
Chilton annexed the unincorporated community of Gravesville in the late twentieth century. Gravesville was founded 1849 by Leroy Graves and the community was named after him. By 1881, it was one of the largest communities in the county behind Chilton and Stockbridge. Gravesville had over 400 residents and it unsuccessfully vied for becoming the county seat. Graves built a sawmill in 1849 which remained in the community until he moved it to Fond du Lac in 1886. At its peak, the community had several general stores, a furniture factory, and a saw/planing mill. It also had a post office (as of 1876).

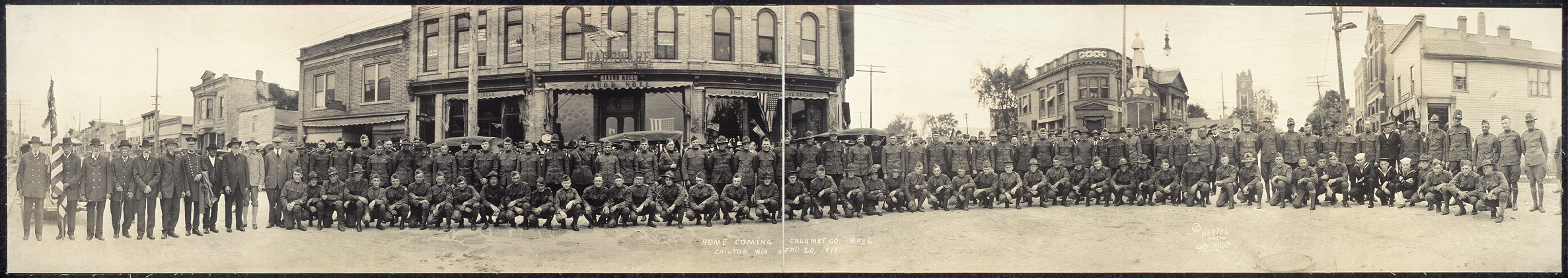
Panorama of Calumet County, Wisconsin soldiers gathered in uptown Chilton, Wisconsin after World War I

== Geography ==
Chilton is located at 44°1′50″N 88°9′31″W (44.030745, -88.158704), along the South Branch of the Manitowoc River.

According to the United States Census Bureau, the city has an area of 4.01 square miles (10.39 km^{2}), of which, 3.97 square miles (10.28 km^{2}) is land and 0.04 square miles (0.10 km^{2}) is water.

=== Climate ===
Climate data for Chilton, Wisconsin (1991–2020 normals, extremes 1894–1910, 1944–present)
Month	Jan	Feb	Mar	Apr	May	Jun	Jul	Aug	Sep	Oct	Nov	Dec	Year
Record high °F (°C)	57 (14)	71 (22)	84 (29)	89 (32)	95 (35)	99 (37)	103 (39)	100 (38)	97 (36)	88 (31)	78 (26)	65 (18)	103 (39)
Mean maximum °F (°C)	43.7 (6.5)	48.3 (9.1)	63.6 (17.6)	76.9 (24.9)	85.2 (29.6)	90.5 (32.5)	91.6 (33.1)	89.7 (32.1)	86.8 (30.4)	78.5 (25.8)	63.4 (17.4)	49.0 (9.4)	93.7 (34.3)
Mean daily maximum °F (°C)	25.6 (−3.6)	29.4 (−1.4)	40.9 (4.9)	54.4 (12.4)	67.4 (19.7)	77.3 (25.2)	81.6 (27.6)	79.6 (26.4)	72.5 (22.5)	58.6 (14.8)	43.9 (6.6)	31.3 (−0.4)	55.2 (12.9)
Daily mean °F (°C)	17.8 (−7.9)	20.8 (−6.2)	31.6 (−0.2)	44.0 (6.7)	56.4 (13.6)	66.6 (19.2)	71.0 (21.7)	69.2 (20.7)	61.6 (16.4)	48.9 (9.4)	36.0 (2.2)	24.4 (−4.2)	45.7 (7.6)
Mean daily minimum °F (°C)	9.9 (−12.3)	12.2 (−11.0)	22.4 (−5.3)	33.7 (0.9)	45.4 (7.4)	55.9 (13.3)	60.5 (15.8)	58.8 (14.9)	50.7 (10.4)	39.3 (4.1)	28.1 (−2.2)	17.4 (−8.1)	36.2 (2.3)
Mean minimum °F (°C)	−9.7 (−23.2)	−7.5 (−21.9)	2.1 (−16.6)	20.5 (−6.4)	32.0 (0.0)	42.6 (5.9)	49.4 (9.7)	47.8 (8.8)	37.0 (2.8)	27.1 (−2.7)	13.9 (−10.1)	−1.6 (−18.7)	−13.5 (−25.3)
Record low °F (°C)	−33 (−36)	−34 (−37)	−28 (−33)	8 (−13)	20 (−7)	31 (−1)	33 (1)	38 (3)	24 (−4)	10 (−12)	−9 (−23)	−21 (−29)	−34 (−37)
Average precipitation inches (mm)	1.48 (38)	1.29 (33)	1.92 (49)	3.07 (78)	3.78 (96)	4.74 (120)	3.91 (99)	3.60 (91)	3.31 (84)	2.98 (76)	2.10 (53)	1.67 (42)	33.85 (860)
Average snowfall inches (cm)	11.3 (29)	11.3 (29)	5.8 (15)	2.6 (6.6)	0.1 (0.25)	0.0 (0.0)	0.0 (0.0)	0.0 (0.0)	0.0 (0.0)	0.6 (1.5)	1.9 (4.8)	9.9 (25)	43.5 (110)
Average extreme snow depth inches (cm)	8.8 (22)	9.0 (23)	6.4 (16)	1.9 (4.8)	0.1 (0.25)	0.0 (0.0)	0.0 (0.0)	0.0 (0.0)	0.0 (0.0)	0.3 (0.76)	1.5 (3.8)	6.6 (17)	11.9 (30)
Average precipitation days (≥ 0.01 in)	9.8	8.7	8.8	10.7	11.8	11.2	10.7	10.5	10.0	11.0	9.0	9.7	121.9
Average snowy days (≥ 0.1 in)	7.3	6.3	3.7	1.6	0.0	0.0	0.0	0.0	0.0	0.3	2.3	6.4	27.9
Source: NOAA

== Demographics ==
Historical population
Census	Pop.	Note	%±
1870	363		—
1880	1,132		211.8%
1890	1,424		25.8%
1900	1,460		2.5%
1910	1,630		11.6%
1920	1,833		12.5%
1930	1,945		6.1%
1940	2,203		13.3%
1950	2,367		7.4%
1960	2,578		8.9%
1970	3,030		17.5%
1980	2,965		−2.1%
1990	3,240		9.3%
2000	3,708		14.4%
2010	3,933		6.1%
2020	4,080		3.7%
2024 (est.)	3,720		−8.8%
U.S. Decennial Census

=== 2020 census ===
As of the census of 2020, there were 4,080 people.

=== 2010 census ===
As of the census of 2010, there were 3,933 people, 1,687 households, and 1,027 families residing in the city. The population density was 990.7 inhabitants per square mile (382.5/km^{2}). There were 1,808 housing units at an average density of 455.4 per square mile (175.8/km^{2}). The racial makeup of the city was 95.8% White, 0.2% African American, 0.4% Native American, 0.5% Asian, 0.2% Pacific Islander, 2.0% from other races, and 0.9% from two or more races. Hispanic or Latino of any race were 4.3% of the population.

There were 1,687 households, out of which 27.7% had children under the age of 18 living with them, 48.0% were married couples living together, 8.2% had a female householder with no husband present, 4.7% had a male householder with no wife present, and 39.1% were non-families. 34.7% of all households were made up of individuals, and 16.7% had someone living alone who was 65 years of age or older. The average household size was 2.28 and the average family size was 2.93.

The median age in the city was 40 years. 24% of residents were under the age of 18; 6.3% were between the ages of 18 and 24; 26.3% were from 25 to 44; 25.9% were from 45 to 64; and 17.5% were 65 years of age or older. The gender makeup of the city was 48.3% male and 51.7% female.

=== 2000 census ===
As of the census of 2000, there were 3,708 people, 1,512 households, and 952 families residing in the city. The population density was 952.4 per square mile (367.7/km^{2}). There were 1,606 housing units at an average density of 412.5 per square mile (159.3/km^{2}). The racial makeup of the city was 98.49% White, 0.38% Black or African American, 0.32% Native American, 0.24% Asian, 0.19% from other races, and 0.38% from two or more races. 0.86% of the population were Hispanic or Latino of any race.

There were 1,512 households, out of which 30.3% had children under the age of 18 living with them, 51.6% were married couples living together, 8.5% had a female householder with no husband present, and 37.0% were non-families. 31.7% of all households were made up of individuals, and 14.4% had someone living alone who was 65 years of age or older. The average household size was 2.35 and the average family size was 2.99.

In the city the population was spread out, with 24.2% under the age of 18, 8.7% from 18 to 24, 29.8% from 25 to 44, 19.0% from 45 to 64, and 18.3% who were 65 years of age or older. The median age was 37 years. For every 100 females there were 98.6 males. For every 100 females age 18 and over, there were 94.1 males.

The median income for a household in the city was $38,401, and the median income for a family was $51,581. Males had a median income of $35,163 versus $22,672 for females. The per capita income for the city was $19,778. About 4.9% of families and 7.4% of the population were below the poverty line, including 13.1% of those under age 18 and 7.2% of those age 65 or over.

== Transportation ==
=== Highway ===
Primary routes to the city are Wisconsin Highway 57/Wisconsin Highway 32 to the north and southeast, and U.S. Route 151 to the east and west. Secondary routes are County Highway G to the south, County Highway F to the northwest, and County Highway Y to the northeast.

U.S. 151 east and west, US 151 routes to Chilton, Wisconsin.
WIS 32 is concurrent with WIS 57 in both directions southbound to New Holstein, Wisconsin and northbound to Green Bay, Wisconsin.
WIS 57 travels south concurrent with WIS 32.

=== Water ===
The south branch of the Manitowoc River snakes through Chilton. Some of the river is navigable, but it is unused except for recreational canoeing. A widening of the river called Lake Chilton has been used for ice skating in winter.

== Education ==
Chilton's public schools are administered by the Chilton Public Schools. The district has one high school, Chilton High School, one elementary school, Chilton Elementary School, and one middle school, Chilton Middle School.

Chilton Area Catholic School is a private Roman Catholic grade school in the city.

== Healthcare ==
Ascension Calumet Hospital is a 25 bed critical access hospital. There are 5.3 primary care physicians per 100,000 population in Chilton compared to the statewide average of 75.6. Chilton is in a primary care Health Professional Shortage Area (HPSA) qualifying the area as a medical desert. By 2035, Chilton is expected to have a 79.2% deficit in physicians, the third largest predicted deficit in Wisconsin. There are no behavior health physicians in Chilton.

== Notable people ==
- George Baldwin, Mayor of Chilton, politician, businessman
- Thomas P.M. Barnett, military geostrategist
- Winifred Bonfils, early 20th Century journalist
- Dave Casper, an NFL Pro Football Hall of Fame player; graduated from Chilton High School in 1970
- Gerald Francis Clifford, a Green Bay Packers executive, Democratic politician and lawyer
- Lewis H. Cook, Wisconsin State Representative
- Jerome F. Fox, Wisconsin State Representative
- Harrison Carroll Hobart, Union Army general, Hobart Park named after him
- Frank L. Kersten, Wisconsin State Representative
- Julius Kiesner, Socialist State Representative
- Francis Peter Leipzig, Roman Catholic bishop
- Nicholas J. Lesselyoung, Wisconsin State Representative
- Thomas Lynch, U.S. Representative
- John McMullen, Wisconsin State Senator
- Robert W. Monk, Wisconsin State Senator, physician, and Mayor of Chilton
- Carl J. Peik, Wisconsin State Representative
- Henry Rollman, Wisconsin State Senator
- Reinhard Schlichting, Wisconsin State Senator
- Benjamin Sweet, Wisconsin State Senator and Union Army general
- Herman C. Wipperman, Wisconsin State Senator

== Notable businesses ==
- Kaytee, a bird seed producer is headquartered in Chilton.
- Gravity Park USA, a motocross track, is near Chilton.

== Radio stations ==
- WKZY, 92.9 FM - Top 40/CHR; is licensed to Chilton
- WMBE (now WZBU), 1530 AM - currently silent; formerly had studios in Chilton as a polka station.
