= National Register of Historic Places listings in Fond du Lac County, Wisconsin =

Location of Fond du Lac County in Wisconsin

This is a list of the National Register of Historic Places listings in Fond du Lac County, Wisconsin. It is intended to provide a comprehensive listing of entries in the National Register of Historic Places that are located in Fond du Lac County, Wisconsin. The locations of National Register properties for which the latitude and longitude coordinates are included below may be seen in a map.

There are 53 properties and districts listed on the National Register in the county.

This National Park Service list is complete through NPS recent listings posted August 7, 2026.

== Current listings ==
	Name on the Register	Image	Date listed	Location	City or town	Description
1	Aetna Station No. 5	Aetna Station No. 5	December 12, 1976 (#76000059)	193 N. Main St. 43°47′03″N 88°26′46″W	Fond du Lac	2-story Italianate-styled fire station designed by local architect Thomas Green and built in 1875, with a 4-story hose-drying tower topped by a wooden belvedere holding a fire bell.
2	Baptist Church	Baptist Church	March 29, 2007 (#07000237)	133 East Fond Du Lac St. 43°50′39″N 88°50′15″W	Ripon	Greek Revival church built in 1857 by the Baptist congregation. Sold to the local American Legion post in 1932. Now the oldest remaining church building in Ripon.
3	Brandon Village Hall and Library	Brandon Village Hall and Library	January 9, 2008 (#07001388)	117 E. Main St. 43°44′06″N 88°46′57″W	Brandon	In 1894 Charles Ellis constructed this building with a harness shop on the first floor and cold storage above. In 1897 the village of Brandon bought the building and reconfigured it for meeting halls, the fire department, and eventually the library.
4	Ceresco Site	Ceresco Site	September 5, 1975 (#75000064)	Bounded by North, Church, Union, and both sides of Warren Sts. 43°50′55″N 88°51′07″W	Ripon	Site of an agricultural commune based on Fourierist ideals, a.k.a. the Wisconsin Phalanx, which was founded in 1844 and disbanded in 1851.
5	Chicago and Northwestern Railroad Depot	Chicago and Northwestern Railroad Depot	August 10, 1990 (#90001232)	182 Forest Ave. 43°46′34″N 88°27′13″W	Fond du Lac	Depot of the CNW, designed by Charles Sumner Frost in Richardsonian Romanesque style and built in 1891. Served as a depot until the 1970s.
6	Club Harbor	Club Harbor	January 22, 1980 (#80000135)	Jct. of WI 151 and WI W 43°54′51″N 88°18′50″W	Pipe	2.5 story brick stagecoach inn, built by Rufus Eaton in 1846 along the Military Road that linked Fort Howard and Fort Winnebago. Operated by Jacob Fuhrman from 1856.
7	William I. Cole House	William I. Cole House	March 28, 2002 (#02000283)	303 Gillett St. 43°46′41″N 88°26′09″W	Fond du Lac	2-story Italianate home with corner pilasters, built in 1857 for William Cole, vice-president of the Cole Savings Bank.
8	George and Mary Agnes Dana House	George and Mary Agnes Dana House	March 6, 2002 (#02000148)	136 Sheboygan St. 43°46′46″N 88°26′28″W	Fond du Lac	Two-story 1906 Craftsman-style house with hip roof and Tudor Revival details on the outside, but a Classical interior with Art Nouveau details. George was an owner of the Globe Furniture Company.
9	East Division Street-Sheboygan Street Historic District	East Division Street-Sheboygan Street Historic District	April 7, 2010 (#10000169)	East Division St. generally bounded by Oaklawn Ave. and Amory St.; Sheboygan St. generally bounded by Everett St. and N. 43°46′44″N 88°26′16″W	Fond du Lac	Large residential historic district with 122 contributing properties. Examples of different styles include the 1852 Greek Revival Hamilton house, the 1875 Second Empire Pierron house, the 1880 Italianate Huber house, the 1885 Gothic Revival Simmons house, the 1890 Queen Anne Boyle house, the c1900 Craftsman Longua house, the 1902 Mediterranean Revival Lyons house, the 1920 Georgian Revival Snow house, the 1927 Colonial Revival Gerhard house, and the 1931 Tudor Revival Kraut house.
10	Rudolph and Louise Ebert House	Rudolph and Louise Ebert House	April 1, 2002 (#02000327)	199 E. Division St. 43°46′52″N 88°26′21″W	Fond du Lac	2.5 story Queen Anne house with two large towers and matching carriage house, built in 1892. Rudolph was president of the German American Savings Bank, Registrar, and city treasurer.
11	El Dorado Apartments	El Dorado Apartments	January 22, 1992 (#91001979)	130 Forest Ave. 43°46′37″N 88°27′07″W	Fond du Lac	Highly intact 4-story Neoclassical-styled brick apartment complex, built in 1921 by the Immel Construction Company. Its apartments were modern at the time, with gas stoves, hot and cold running water, telephones and garbage disposals.
12	End of the Trail	End of the Trail	August 29, 1980 (#80000136)	Madison St. (Shaler Park); 43°38′17″N 88°43′50″W	Waupun	Bronze-cast statue of a Native American warrior slumped on his horse, commissioned by Clarence Shaler and created by James Earle Fraser in 1929.
13	First Baptist Church of Fond du Lac	First Baptist Church of Fond du Lac	December 29, 1986 (#86003522)	90 S. Macy St. 43°46′35″N 88°26′53″W	Fond du Lac	Neo-Gothic styled church with modified cruciform plan, designed by M. O. Pillsbury and built 1906-07 for influential Baptist congregation.
14	First Congregational Church	First Congregational Church	September 4, 1979 (#79000077)	220 Ransom St. 43°50′42″N 88°50′26″W	Ripon	Prominent church building with square corner tower, designed by E. Townsend Mix in Romanesque Revival style and built between 1865 and 1868. This Congregational congregation included settlers from New England and was active early in the abolition movement, the formation of the Republican party, and other progressive causes.
15	Edwin H. Galloway House	Edwin H. Galloway House	May 28, 1976 (#76000060)	336 E. Pioneer Rd. 43°45′17″N 88°26′07″W	Fond du Lac	Italianate mansion with 3-story tower, begun by Selim Newton in 1846, and greatly expanded by Galloway from 1868 to 1880. Galloway was involved in lumber, real estate, banking, and served in the state assembly. Now a museum.
16	John Scott Horner House	John Scott Horner House	September 27, 1984 (#84003672)	336 Scott St. 43°50′44″N 88°50′01″W	Ripon	Simplified Italianate house built around 1860 with walls of limestone masonry. Horner was a founder of Ripon, who had been governor of Michigan Territory and secretary of Wisconsin Territory.
17	Hotel Calumet	Hotel Calumet	March 20, 1992 (#92000111)	170 Forest Ave. 43°46′37″N 88°27′11″W	Fond du Lac	3-story simple Neoclassical hotel built between 1902 and 1907 and expanded 1920-22. This hotel was a railroad hotel, largely serving travelers from the Chicago & Northwestern depot next door.
18	Hotel Retlaw	Hotel Retlaw	September 7, 1984 (#84003673)	15 E. Division St. 43°46′46″N 88°26′02″W	Fond du Lac	8-story hotel designed in Neoclassical style by Herbert Tullgren, built in 1922-23 with a steel frame clad in brick and stone, and later added on to. A first-class hotel, the Retlaw hosted Eleanor Roosevelt, Gene Autry, John F. Kennedy, and other notables.
19	Independent Order of Odd Fellows Lodge No. 89	Independent Order of Odd Fellows Lodge No. 89	April 6, 2015 (#15000137)	203 W. Division St. 43°48′27″N 88°40′37″W	Rosendale	IOOF Lodge built in 1891, and used as meeting hall and for basketball games, plays, and dinners. Now houses the Rosendale Historical Society.
20	Kendall-Blankenburg House	Kendall-Blankenburg House	April 18, 2002 (#02000381)	47 Sixth St. 43°46′20″N 88°26′43″W	Fond du Lac	Second Empire-styled house with mansard roof and high limestone foundation, built in 1874 by Charles Kendall, a Civil War veteran and painter. Around 1890 Albert Blankenburg, who owned a furniture store, added the ell with Stick style decoration.
21	Linden Street Historic District	Linden Street Historic District	April 26, 2002 (#02000418)	253-295 and 274-304 Linden St. 43°46′22″N 88°26′54″W	Fond du Lac	Small residential neighborhood just SW of downtown, including the 1856 Brown Octagon house, the 1867 early Italianate Pierce house, the 1885 late Italianate Treleven house, the 1904 Queen Anne-styled Mieklejohn house, and the 1910 Craftsman Karstens house.
22	Little White Schoolhouse	Little White Schoolhouse	August 14, 1973 (#73000079)	SE corner of Blackburn and Blossom Sts. 43°50′38″N 88°50′11″W	Ripon	Reputed birthplace of the U.S. Republican Party, born from an anti-slavery meeting in 1854. Greek Revival-styled one-room school built in 1853.
23	Longfellow School	Longfellow School	April 14, 1997 (#97000325)	221 Spaulding Ave. 43°50′53″N 88°50′00″W	Ripon	2-story Collegiate Gothic elementary school designed by Auler, Jensen and Brown and built 1927-28.
24	William and Annie McDermott House	William and Annie McDermott House	September 10, 2014 (#14000616)	109 S. Park Ave. 43°46′33″N 88°26′20″W	Fond du Lac	2.5 story fine Queen Anne-styled home with porte-cochère built in 1899. William was a real estate developer and philanthropist, pushing for creation of what is now McDermott Park.
25	Moose Temple	Moose Temple	April 22, 1993 (#93000340)	17-23 Forest Ave. 43°46′39″N 88°26′51″W	Fond du Lac	3.5-story brick Neoclassical building designed by Frank Stepnoski and built around 1923, originally with stores and a barber shop on the first floor and Moose chambers and auditorium above.
26	North Main Street Historic District	North Main Street Historic District	March 6, 2002 (#02000149)	Roughly along Main St., from Merrill to Sheboygan; 43°46′53″N 88°26′49″W	Fond du Lac	Part of Fond du Lac's old downtown, including the 1852 Greek Revival Schmidt Sample Room, where Carrie Nation smashed a whiskey bottle with her hatchet in 1902, the 1876 Italianate Radford-Reinig block, and the 1925 Classical Revival/Beaux Arts Fischer Theater.
27	Northern Casket Company Building	Northern Casket Company Building	January 11, 2019 (#100003303)	16 N. Brooke St. 43°46′46″N 88°27′16″W	Fond du Lac	A rare intact 1919 factory which had a major fire on June 2, 2020.
28	Octagon House	Octagon House	November 3, 1972 (#72000051)	276 Linden St. 43°46′16″N 88°26′54″W	Fond du Lac	1.5 story octagon house with grout walls designed by Orson Fowler and built around 1856 by Isaac Brown, an early builder and first mayor of Fond du Lac.
29	Palm Tree Road Bridge	Palm Tree Road Bridge	December 12, 2022 (#100008451)	Palm Tree Rd. over the Sheboygan R. 43°48′51″N 88°09′53″W	Marshfield	Carefully proportioned 9-arch stone bridge built of fieldstone in 1901 by Swiss immigrant Alphonse Halter. Now the longest stone-arch bridge in the state, by three arches.
30	Marcellus Pedrick House	Marcellus Pedrick House	September 29, 1976 (#76000061)	515 Ransom Ave. 43°50′27″N 88°50′23″W	Ripon	This Italianate house constructed around 1858 appears to be the earliest house with walls of concrete block in the state. Pedrick, a mason, constructed it himself.
31	Peniel Chapel		April 9, 2026 (#100012890)	W9644 Zoar Road; 43°53′41″N 88°38′29″W	Eldorado	Wooden Greek Revival church built in 1856 by Welsh immigrants who were Calvinistic Methodist - later Presbyterian USA. Served that congregation until around 1977 - now houses Cymanfa Ganu.
32	Pipe Site		December 22, 1978 (#78000095)	Address restricted	Pipe	Large Oneota village on a gravel knoll east of Lake Winnebago. Excavations have found remnants of an oval-shaped wigwam(?), various cache and storage pits, stone wedges, scrapers, adzes, and net sinkers, awls made from copper, deer, bird bones, and the spines of freshwater drum, and numerous potsherds.
33	Raube Road Site	Raube Road Site	June 4, 1992 (#92000589)	Address Restricted; 43°43′49″N 88°43′53″W	Springvale	Two segments of the old Military Road built around 1835, which linked Fort Howard (Green Bay) with Fort Crawford (Prairie du Chien).
34	The Recording Angel	The Recording Angel	July 15, 1974 (#74000088)	Forest Mound Cemetery, N. Madison St. 43°38′20″N 88°44′01″W	Waupun	Bronze sculpture of an angel holding the Book of Life, created by Lorado Taft around 1923. Given by the Shalers for the whole cemetery.
35	Ripon College Historic District	Ripon College Historic District	June 2, 1995 (#95000679)	Jct. of Seward and Elm Sts. 43°50′39″N 88°50′34″W	Ripon	The older buildings of Ripon College, including the Greek Revival/Italianate East Hall, built 1851-1863 (pictured), the 1865 Romanesque Revival First Congregational Church, the 1930 Neoclassical Lane Library, and the 1940 Georgian Revival Merriman house.
36	Saint John Evangelical Lutheran Church	Saint John Evangelical Lutheran Church	April 15, 1986 (#86000794)	670 County Trunk Hwy. S 43°33′52″N 88°10′59″W	New Fane	Rural Gothic-styled fieldstone church with angle buttresses, built around 1871.
37	St. John the Baptist Catholic Church	St. John the Baptist Catholic Church	October 29, 1980 (#80000137)	Off WI Q 43°52′36″N 88°17′26″W	Johnsburg	Romanesque-styled Catholic church built of limestone from the surrounding fields, with a prominent steeple and spire, begun in 1857 and added to in 1892. The community is so strongly German that the language was used in services until 1948.
38	St. Joseph's School	St. Joseph's School	August 21, 2017 (#100001500)	95 E. 2nd St. 43°46′32″N 88°26′36″W	Fond du Lac	Catholic parochial school, designed by Frank Stepnoski in Collegiate Gothic style with brick walls and an entry tower and built in 1928. A.k.a. St. Mary's Springs Academy.
39	St. Mary School	St. Mary School	May 1, 2017 (#100000948)	63 E. Merrill Ave. 43°46′52″N 88°26′40″W	Fond du Lac	Contemporary Style 2-story school clad in limestone, designed by Frank & Sylvester Stepnoski of Fond du Lac and built in 1949.
40	St. Matthias Mission	St. Matthias Mission	October 13, 1988 (#88001838)	1081 County Trunk S 43°34′44″N 88°10′29″W	New Fane	Rural Catholic church in Carpenter Gothic style, built by immigrants from Bengel in the Rhineland in 1861, with tower added in 1888. With adjacent cemetery.
41	St. Peter's Episcopal Church	St. Peter's Episcopal Church	December 31, 1974 (#74000089)	217 Houston St. 43°50′39″N 88°50′03″W	Ripon	Carpenter Gothic-styled church clad in board and batten, built in 1860 by the local Episcopal congregation.
42	Sisson's Peony Gardens	Sisson's Peony Gardens	December 22, 2006 (#06001193)	207 N. Main St. 43°48′33″N 88°40′32″W	Rosendale	Peony nursery and display garden established by Wilbur Sisson around 1920, with a fieldstone windmill built by Jesse Phillips. Now rehabilitated by the Rosendale Historical Society.
43	South Main Street Historic District	South Main Street Historic District	March 11, 1993 (#93000160)	Roughly, 71-213 S. Main St. 43°46′32″N 88°26′48″W	Fond du Lac	South end of the old downtown, including the 1875 Italianate Frieberg Grocery, the 1890 High Victorian Gothic Carstens' Meat Market, the 1903 Richardsonian Romanesque Commercial National Bank, the 1912 Neoclassical Citizens State Bank, and the 1923 Commercial-style Commercial National Bank,
44	Southwest Historic District	Southwest Historic District	June 22, 2004 (#04000653)	115 Belleville, parts of Grove, Lincoln, Newbury, Oak, Ransom, W. Sullivan, Thorne, Watertown, and Watson St., and Woodside; 43°50′19″N 88°50′28″W	Ripon	Large residential district including the 1853 Greek Revival Walcott house, the 1866 Italianate Akin house, the 1875 Second Empire Manville house, the 1886 Queen Anne Mead house, the 1909 Craftsman Higby house, the 1913 Georgian Revival Strauss house, the 1912 Colonial Revival Higby house, the 1921 Dutch Colonial Revival Faustman house, and the 1930 Tudor Revival Griffith house.
45	Montgomery and Nancy Tallmadge House	Montgomery and Nancy Tallmadge House	April 18, 2002 (#02000382)	225 Sheboygan St. 43°46′47″N 88°26′18″W	Fond du Lac	2-story front-gabled brick Italianate/Greek Revival house built in 1875. The Tallmadges were New Yorkers who farmed in the town of Fond du Lac until they retired to this house in town.
46	Tygert Street Historic District	Tygert Street Historic District	February 18, 2011 (#11000020)	Tygert St. and Spaulding Ave., generally bounded by Scott St. and E. Lane St. 43°50′51″N 88°50′04″W	Ripon	Residential neighborhood developed partly by John Scott Horner, including the 1852 Eggleston/Brown house, the 1854 Colonial Revival Northrup-Dellinger-Cowan house, the 1857 Second Empire Henton house, the 1866 Italianate Fowler house, the 1895 Queen Anne Mason house, the 1907 Dutch Colonial Revival Heiman house, the 1915 Behm Bungalow, the 1921 Craftsman Huibregtse house, and the 1935 Tudor Revival Krause house.
47	Wallace-Jagdfeld Octagon House	Wallace-Jagdfeld Octagon House	April 26, 2002 (#02000416)	171 Forest Ave. 43°46′44″N 88°27′13″W	Fond du Lac	2-story octagon house with Italianate details and tower, built around 1857. Norman Wallace was a local jeweler. Casper Jagdfeld owned the Northwestern Railroad Hotel.
48	Watson Street Commercial Historic District	Watson Street Commercial Historic District	September 27, 1991 (#91001396)	Roughly, Watson St. from Seward to Jackson Sts. and Jackson and Scott Sts. from Watson to Blackburn Sts. 43°50′41″N 88°50′18″W	Ripon	Most of Ripon's old downtown, including the 1860/1890 Dodge and Manville Carriage Works, the 1870 Wolcott and Kinsbury Jewelry Store, the 1872 Italianate Pettibone dry goods store, the 1905 Neoclassical Ripon Public Library, the 1922 20th-Century Commercial-styled Kohl Hardware Company, and the 1930 Art Deco First National Bank.
49	Waupun Commercial Historic District	Waupun Commercial Historic District	September 30, 2019 (#100004468)	Roughly bounded by E. Franklin St., Carrington St., E. Jefferson St., and Forest St. 43°38′00″N 88°43′47″W	Waupun	Part of Waupun's old downtown, including the 1868 Italianate-styled Opera House, the 1868 Italianate Odd Fellows Hall, and the 1892 Queen Anne-styled Carrington Harness/Starr Saloon.
50	Waupun Post Office	Waupun Post Office	October 24, 2000 (#00001262)	400 E. Franklin St. 43°38′04″N 88°43′46″W	Waupun	1932 Neoclassical-styled U.S. post office, red brick with limestone trim, with a relief carving of an eagle above the center doorway.
51	Winnebago Cheese Company		April 11, 2022 (#100007575)	233 West Division St. 43°46′44″N 88°27′20″W	Fond du Lac	Factory complex of the Winnebago Cheese Company, with the front 2-story section built in 1915, a 3-story addition added by 1925, and a rear cold storage section added in 1925. Operated into the 1980s.
52	Jacob Woodruff House	Jacob Woodruff House	December 30, 1974 (#74000090)	610 Liberty St. 43°50′52″N 88°50′49″W	Ripon	Octagon house begun in 1850, with grout walls, a large bay window, and widow's walk. Woodruff was a blacksmith from Connecticut who joined the Ceresco Phalanx. He was also an abolitionist and helped found Wisconsin's Republican Party.
53	Zion Congregational Church	Zion Congregational Church	February 1, 2006 (#05001579)	N4042 Amity Rd. 43°41′28″N 88°47′45″W	Alto	Congregational church built in 1858 by Dutch immigrants, with limestone walls, Greek Revival styling, and cemetery.

== See also ==
- List of National Historic Landmarks in Wisconsin
- National Register of Historic Places listings in Wisconsin
- Listings in neighboring counties: Calumet, Dodge, Green Lake, Sheboygan, Washington, Winnebago
