= El Dorado Apartments =

El Dorado Apartments may refer to:

- El Dorado Apartments (El Dorado, Arkansas), listed on the NRHP in Arkansas
- Buildings at 1200-1206 Washington Street, Hoboken, New Jersey, known as the El Dorado Apartments
- El Dorado Apartments (Fond du Lac, Wisconsin), listed on the NRHP in Wisconsin
- The Eldorado, New York City
