= Dana House =

Dana House may refer to:

in the United States

(by state then city)

- Dana Adobe, Nipomo, California, listed on the National Register of Historic Places (NRHP)
- James Dwight Dana House, New Haven, Connecticut, NRHP-listed
- Susan Lawrence Dana House, Springfield, Illinois, a Frank Lloyd Wright house, NRHP-listed
- Dana-Palmer House, Cambridge, Massachusetts, NRHP-listed
- Dana House (Lebanon, New Hampshire), Lebanon, New Hampshire, listed on the New Hampshire State Register of Historic Places
- Dana Meeting House, New Hampton, New Hampshire, NRHP-listed
- Marcus Dana House, Fostoria, Ohio, listed on the NRHP in Hancock County, Ohio
- Marshall Dana House, Milwaukie, Oregon, listed on the NRHP in Clackamas County
- George and Mary Agnes Dana House, Fond du Lac, Wisconsin, listed on the NRHP in Fond du Lac County

== See also ==
- Richard Henry Dana Branch, Los Angeles, California, a library branch, NRHP-listed
- Daina House, actress
