= Charles H. Murphy Sr. House =

Historic house in Arkansas, United States

- U.S. National Register of Historic Places
- U.S. Historic district – Contributing property
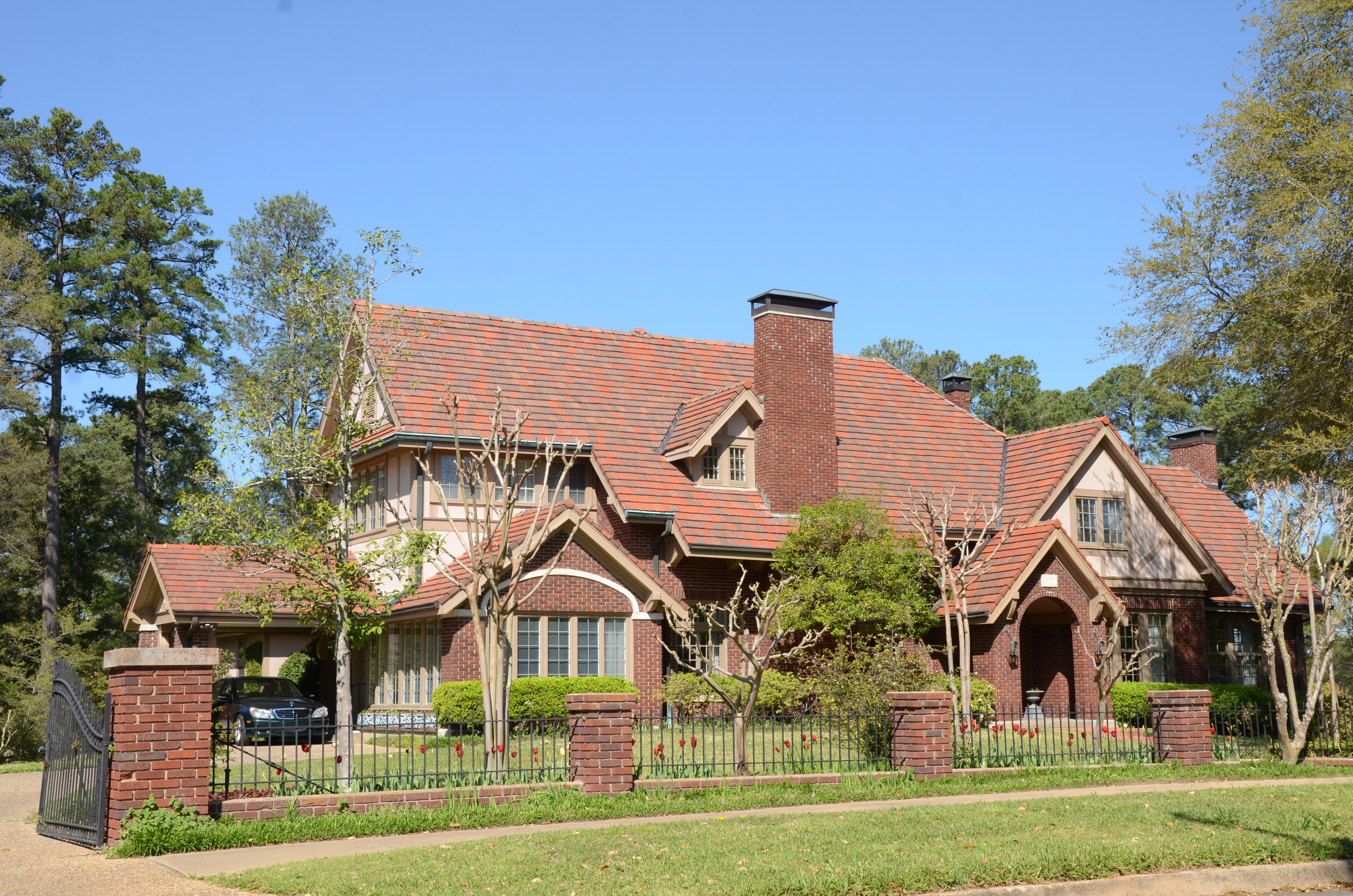

- Location within Arkansas Location within the United States
- Location: 900 N. Madison Ave., El Dorado, Arkansas
- Coordinates: 33.22001°N 92.66014°W
- Area: 6 acres (2.4 ha)
- Built: 1925
- Architect: Charles L. Thompson
- Architectural style: Tudor Revival
- Part of: Murphy-Hill Historic District (ID07000974)
- NRHP reference No.: 83001168

Significant dates
- Added to NRHP: September 8, 1983
- Designated CP: September 20, 2007

The Charles H. Murphy Sr. House in El Dorado, Arkansas, was built in 1925. The 2 1/2-story house was designed in Tudor Revival style by architect Charles L. Thompson, and built in 1925–26, during El Dorado's oil boom years. Charles Murphy was a major landowner, originally in the lumber business, who benefitted greatly from the oil boom due to the increased value of local real estate. He founded the predecessor company to Murphy Oil, which is still headquartered in El Dorado.

The house was listed on the U.S. National Register of Historic Places in 1983, and included in the Murphy-Hill Historic District in 2007.

== See also ==
- National Register of Historic Places listings in Union County, Arkansas
