= Murphy–Hill Historic District =

Historic district in Arkansas, United States

- U.S. National Register of Historic Places
- U.S. Historic district
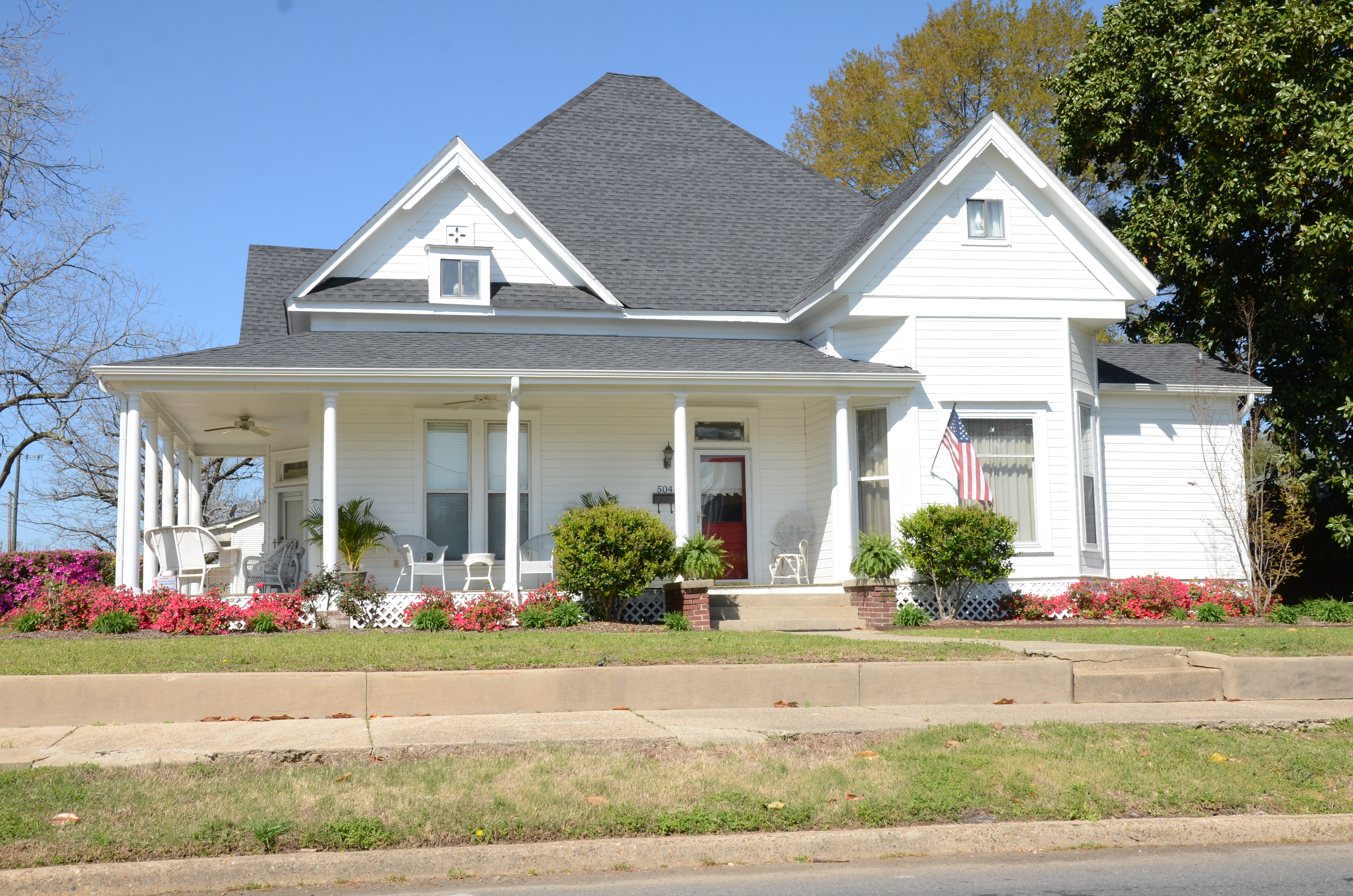

- Location within Arkansas Location within the United States
- Location: Roughly bounded by E. 5th St., N. Jefferson St., E. Peach St., N. Madison St., and E. Faulkner St., El Dorado, Arkansas
- Coordinates: 33.217°N 92.66109°W
- Area: 40 acres (16 ha)
- Built: 1880
- Architectural style: Queen Anne, Late 19th And 20th Century Revivals
- NRHP reference No.: 07000974
- Added to NRHP: September 20, 2007

The Murphy–Hill Historic District encompasses the oldest residential portion of the city of El Dorado, Arkansas. It is located just north of the central business district, bounded on the north by East 5th Street, on the west by North Jefferson and North Jackson Avenues, on the east by North Madison Avenue, and on the south by East Peach and East Oak Streets. Six of the 76 houses in the 40-acre (16 ha) district were built before 1900, including the John Newton House, one of the first buildings to be built in El Dorado. Of particular note from this early period is a highly elaborate Queen Anne Victorian at 326 Church Street.

There are also only a few houses which were built prior to the discovery of oil in El Dorado in 1921. These are all Plain/Traditional in their styling, although some Craftsman details are visible in the later houses. The discovery of oil was followed by a building boom, and this district saw significant construction until about 1940. Most of the houses built have Craftsman styling, which was popular at the time. Typical features seen in these houses included low-pitch gable roofs with long overhangs and exposed rafter ends. Porches are usually supported by pillars mounted on either stone or brick piers. They are commonly a single story, although there are some that are two or 2-1/2 stories tall.

There are some multiunit apartment houses and otherwise distinctive houses in the district. Along North Madison Street there are several houses reflecting popular Revival styles, notably including the Charles H. Murphy Sr. House, a separately-listed house designed by Charles L. Thompson in the English Revival style. There are two houses (711 North Madison and 528 North Jefferson) in the Spanish Revival (Mission) style. Three apartment houses are found in the district: a Mission-style block at 711 North Jefferson, a Craftsman block at 701 North Jefferson, and the Classical Revival El Dorado Apartments at 420 Wilson Place.

The district was listed on the National Register of Historic Places in 2007, as a well-preserved representative of the city's history between 1880 and 1957.

== See also ==
- National Register of Historic Places listings in Union County, Arkansas
