= Newton House Museum =

Historic house in Arkansas, United States

- Matthew Rainey House
- U.S. National Register of Historic Places
- U.S. Historic district – Contributing property
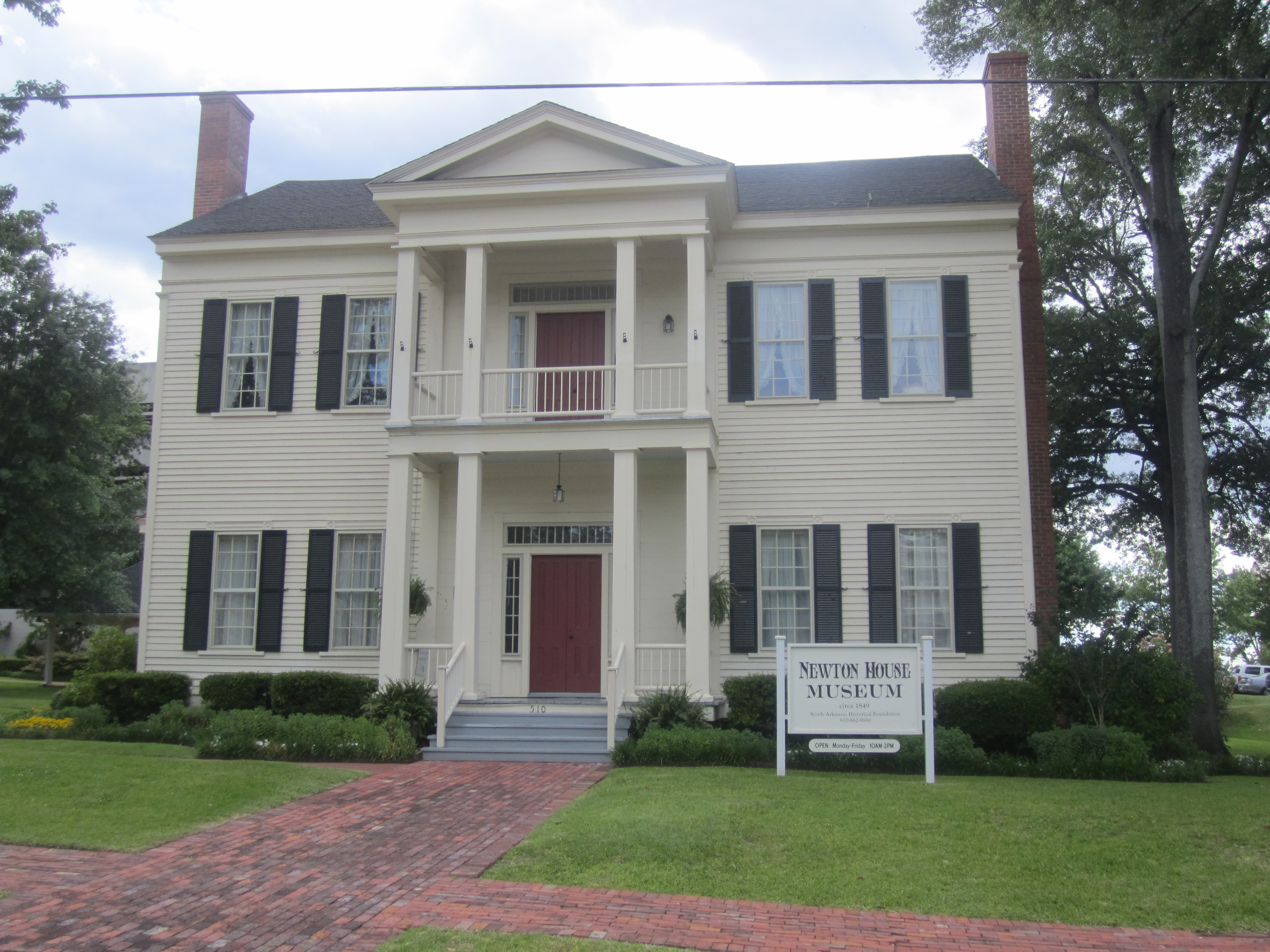

- Location within Arkansas Location within the United States
- Location: 510 N. Jackson St., El Dorado, Arkansas
- Coordinates: 33°12′53″N 92°39′44″W
- Area: less than one acre
- Built: 1852
- Part of: Murphy-Hill Historic District (ID07000974)
- NRHP reference No.: 74000501

Significant dates
- Added to NRHP: November 6, 1974
- Designated CP: September 20, 2007

The Newton House Museum, also known as the Matthew Rainey House, is a historic house museum at 510 North Jackson Street in El Dorado, Arkansas, United States. The house was built sometime between 1843 and 1853 by Matthew Rainey, El Dorado's first settler, and is the oldest building in the city. It is a vernacular two-story wood-frame structure with a central hall and rooms on either side. It stands at the edge of a 4-acre (1.6 ha) parcel, having been moved from its center in 1910.

The house was listed on the National Register of Historic Places in 1974, and included in the Murphy-Hill Historic District in 2007. It is now owned by the South Arkansas Historical Foundation, which operates it as a museum.

== See also ==
- National Register of Historic Places listings in Union County, Arkansas
