= Moose Temple (Fond du Lac, Wisconsin) =

Historic clubhouse in Fond du Lac, Wisconsin

- U.S. National Register of Historic Places
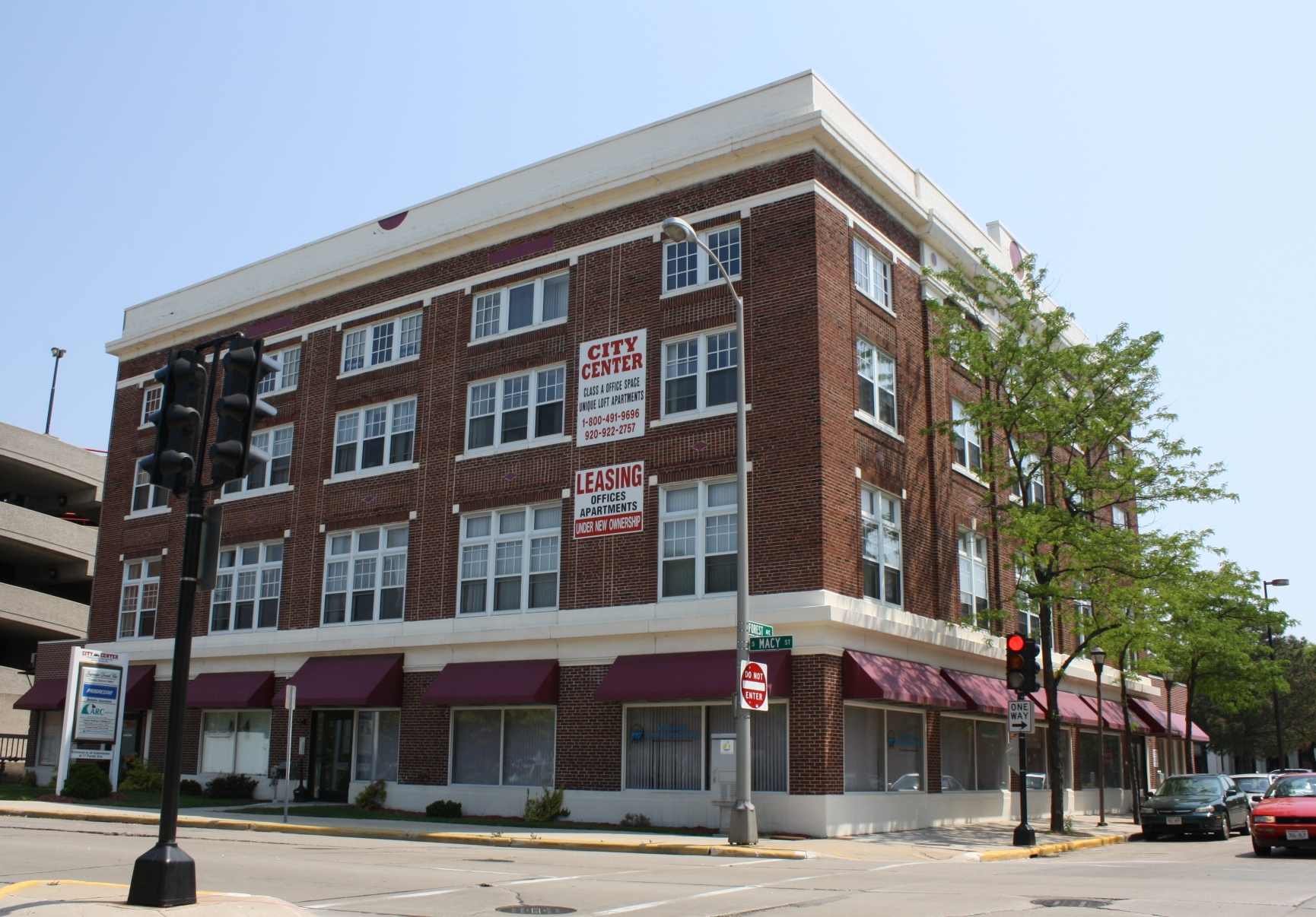
- Northeast corner of Macy Street and Forest Avenue

- Location within Wisconsin Location within the United States
- Location: 17 Forest Avenue; Fond du Lac, Wisconsin 54935
- Coordinates: 43°46′38″N 88°26′52″W
- Built: 1924
- Built by: Immel Construction
- Architect: Francis Stepnowski
- Former names: Moose Temple; Eagles Building; College Building; Maze Building; Nielsen Building
- Architectural style: Classical Revival
- Restored: 1988
- Website: davidjdecker.com/property/city-center-lofts
- NRHP reference No.: 93000340
- Added to NRHP: April 22, 1993

The Moose Temple is a historic Loyal Order of Moose clubhouse in downtown Fond du Lac, Wisconsin completed in 1924. The National Register of Historic Places listed the structure, now known as the City Center Lofts, in 1993.

== History ==
On June 9, 1910, 164 charter members founded Lodge No. 281 of the Loyal Order of Moose. Under the leadership of William S. Dhyr, the local group grew to 1,500 members and began planning for a dedicated clubhouse, raising $225,000 by 1923 ($4.25 million in 2025). The original floorplan consisted of street-facing retail units on the first floor, club offices on the second floor, and a large meeting hall on the third floor and mezzanine. The building opened in 1924 but the Moose lost ownership in 1930 as a result of the Great Depression.

Subsequently, a number of different groups occupied the building. The Fraternal Order of Eagles ran it as their own clubhouse from 1930 to 1941. Under the leadership of L.T Maze, the Fond du Lac Commercial College taught their classes there from 1941 to the mid-1950s. The school used the large auditorium for "Open Forum" classes where the students taught subjects they selected. The A.C. Nielsen Co. converted the interior of the building into office space in 1957, but vacated in the early 1980s when they moved around the block to 30 South Main Street. The property then sat vacant until a restoration and adaptive reuse in 1988 converted the upper floors to apartments. Flanagan State Bank and Thrivent later moved into the first-floor offices.

== Architecture ==
Local architect Francis Stepnowski (1881-1952) planned the 1924 clubhouse as one of his first major commissions. His design consists of three stories topped with a mezzanine using steel, reinforced concrete, and brick, with a Classical Revival style.

The front of the building faces Forest Avenue and consists of five bays separated by four brick pilasters. The first floor has four storefront windows and the main entrance, which is on the right with a stone surround. As the building goes up, the windows become progressively smaller ending in three lunette windows on the top floor. Horizontally, a narrow stone stringcourse runs above the top windows and wide cornices run above the first floor and under the roof. The side façade along Macy Street contains similar but less detailed finishes while the opposite side originally faced an alley, so it consists of simple brick.

A number of changes were made to the exterior of the building over the years. When a parking garage replaced the original building behind the temple, an unfinished party wall was revealed which was resurfaced in new brick. A parapet on the roof originally held a concrete moose head. The store doors and entrances are now plate glass windows. The 1988 renovations included adding a four-story elevator and utility tower on the back.

== See also ==
- National Register of Historic Places listings in Fond du Lac County, Wisconsin
