= Rudolph and Louise Ebert House =

Historic house in Wisconsin, United States

- U.S. National Register of Historic Places
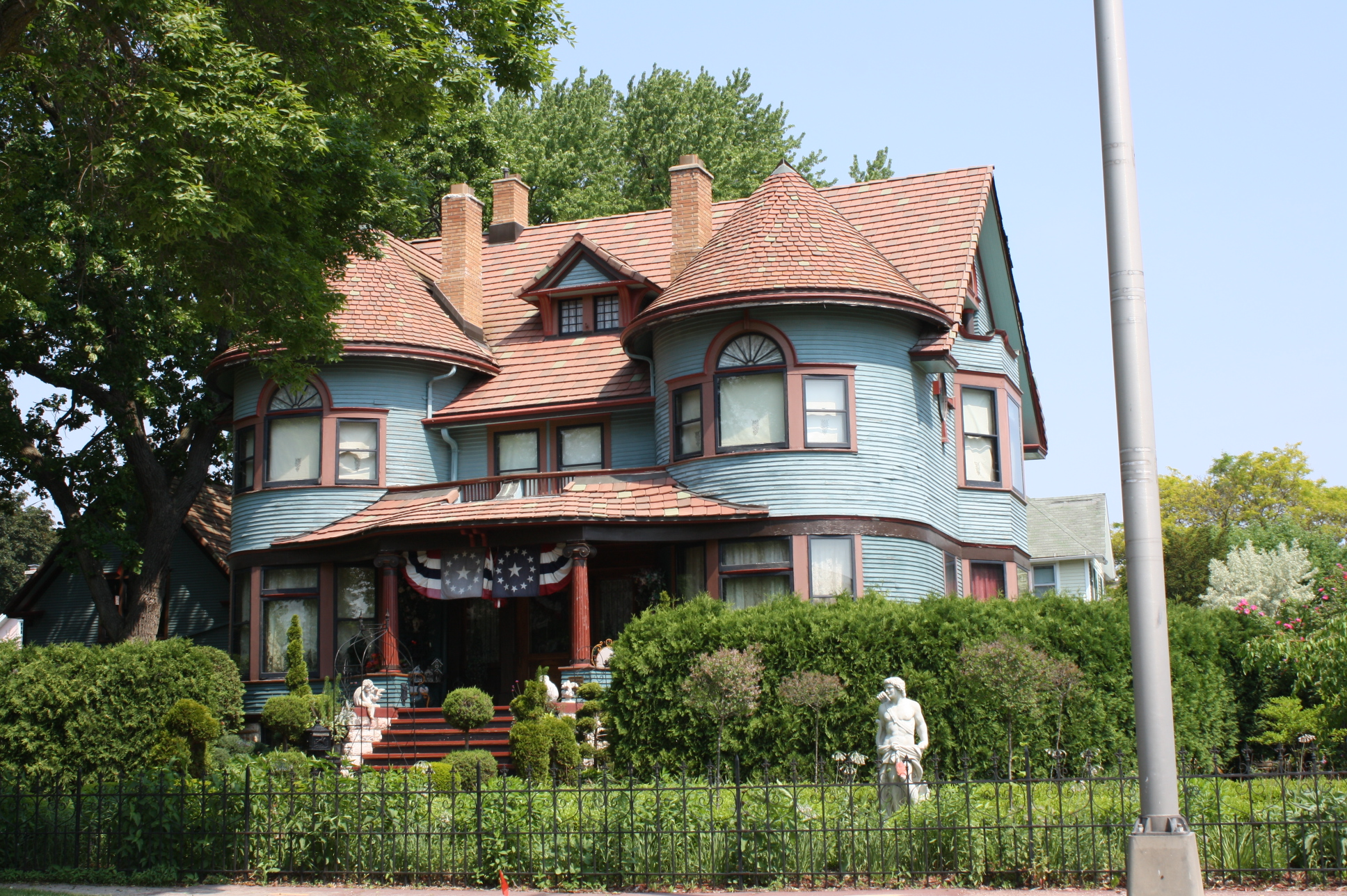
- Rudolph and Louise Ebert House
- Location: 199 E. Division St., Fond du Lac, Wisconsin
- Coordinates: 43°46′52″N 88°26′21″W
- Area: less than one acre
- Built: 1892
- Architect: A. M. F. Colton
- Architectural style: Queen Anne
- NRHP reference No.: 02000327
- Added to NRHP: April 1, 2002

The Rudolph and Louise Ebert House is located in Fond du Lac, Wisconsin.

== History ==
Rudolph Ebert was a bank president and local politician. As known as the 'Pink Lady', the house was listed on the State Register of Historic Places in 2001 and on the National Register of Historic Places the following year.
