= Pipe, Wisconsin =

Unincorporated community in Wisconsin, United States

- Unincorporated community
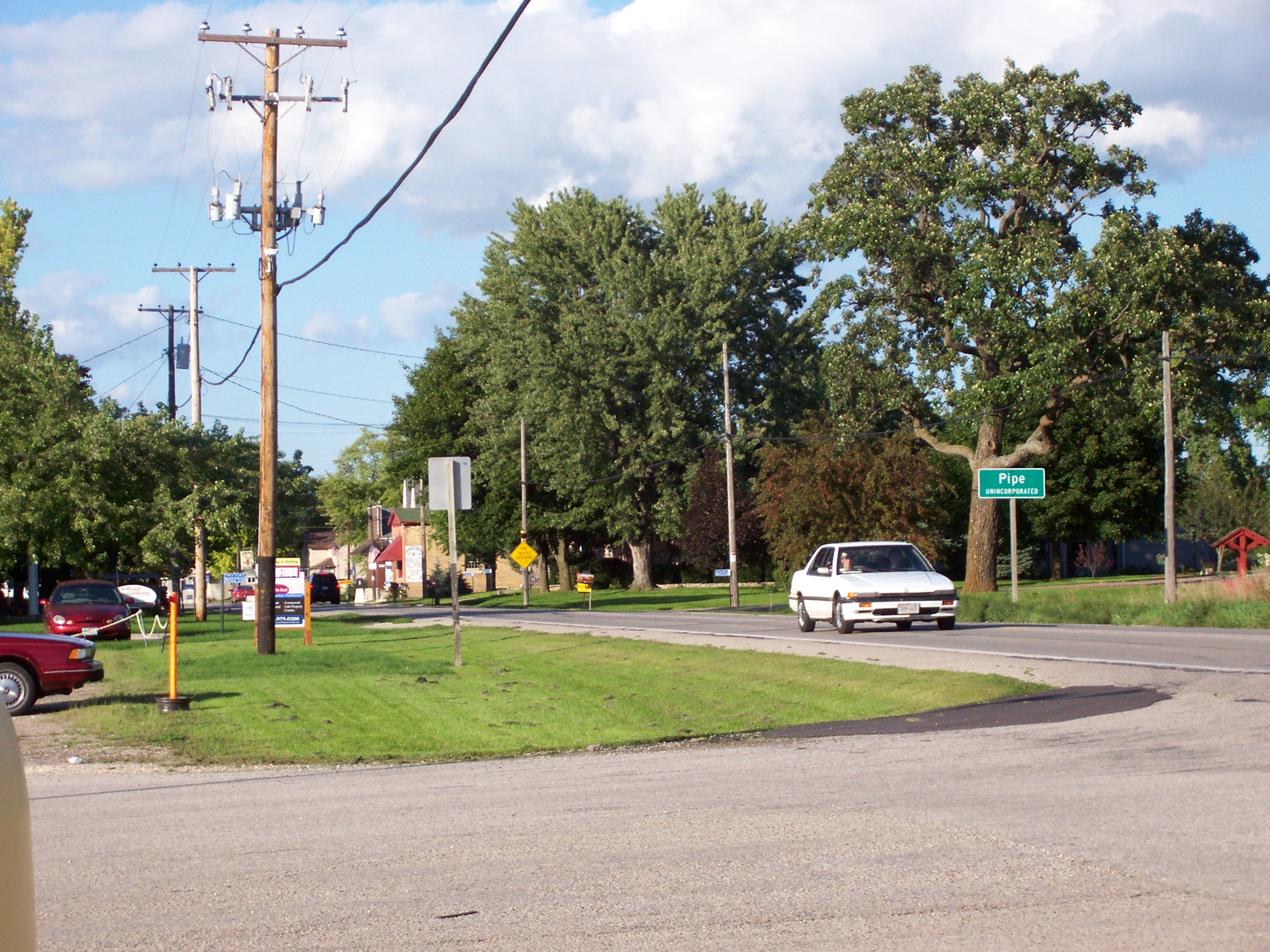
- Pipe, Wisconsin

- Location within Wisconsin Location within the United States
- Coordinates: 43°54′51″N 88°18′45″W
- Country: United States
- State: Wisconsin
- County: Fond du Lac
- Elevation: 804 ft (245 m)
- Time zone: UTC-6 (Central (CST))
  - Summer (DST): UTC-5 (CDT)
- Zip codes: 53049
- Area code: 920
- GNIS feature ID: 1571550

Pipe is an unincorporated community in the Town of Calumet in Fond du Lac County, Wisconsin, United States. It is located approximately 1 mile (1.6 km) east of Lake Winnebago.

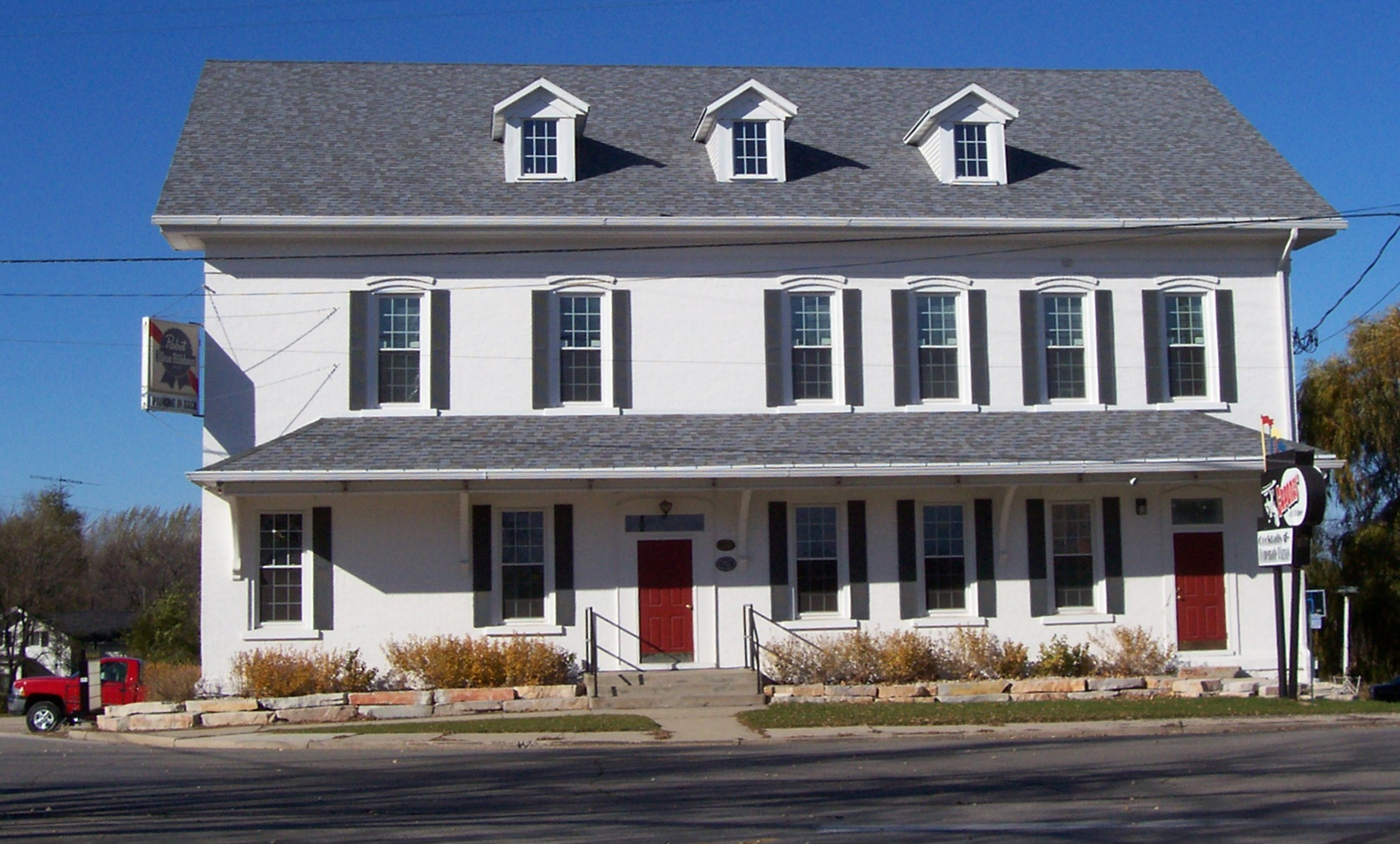
Former stagecoach inn

== History ==
On September 25, 1817, United States Army Judge Advocate Samuel A. Storrow traveled from Green Bay, Wisconsin to Chicago. He described a Native American village he saw:

"...we saw it at a distance. It was a village of Fals Avoines [rice gatherers], situate on the edge of a prairie which borders Lake Winnebago. The Lake lay before it on one side, and on the other the prairie, rising with a gentle acclivity from the margin of the water. The spot was well chosen for beauty, warmth, and fertility. There was nothing about that indicated a recent commencement. The grounds bore marks of long cultivation, and the few trees were left standing seemed as if distributed for ornament and shade. The village has received the name of Calumet [Pipe]; it consists of about 150 souls, and has rarely been visited by whites, except a few voyageurs on their way to Ouisconsin [Wisconsin]."

Pipe used to be known as Calumet Harbor. George White, who came to Calumet Harbor in 1837, established a hotel and bar along Military Road, then became a real estate agent. He proposed that the town of Calumet be annexed from Calumet County into Fond du Lac County. When the town was annexed into Fond du Lac County in 1842, White was named its first town supervisor. A stagecoach inn was built in 1846 by Henry Fuhrman, which became a major stop on Military Road. The inn was a three-story building with a dance floor on the second floor that served as a gathering place for the youth in the community. The third floor was a rooming house for guests, most often fishermen. Tom Brown purchased the building in the 1940s, named it Club Harbor, and later erected a modern electric sign and added a large cedar dining hall to the building. The inn existed as Club Harbor until it closed in the late 1970s. Club Harbor was sold in 2004. It has been extensively remodeled and is now called Capone's.

A large, cream city brick house bears a date of 1858 above its front threshold.

The next oldest structure in Pipe was the former Farmers State Bank built in 1914. It failed during the Great Depression, closing overnight as a run was made on its deposits. In 1937 the brick building was converted into a butcher shop, owned by Frank and Evelyn Groeschel, and in 1960 sold to Alfred "Butch" and Kathleen Endries and his brother, Roman Endries. Coming from a family of butchers and professionally trained in Toledo, Ohio, Butch Endries expanded the operation with specialty cuts and steak sandwiches to area bars and restaurants and catered to local sportsmen even with their wild game from Western U.S., Alaska and Canada. The couple eventually retired in 1998 selling the business to Ed Weber and Bob Driefurst. The bank vault door, made of oak, still serves as the entry to a meat locker. A portable metal vault also remains as a file system and writing space. A cash register manufactured in the 1920s is also still in use. On display is a very large, vintage, mechanical, Burroughs adding machine. It was the pride of the corporation, manufactured with its workings visible through thick glass walls. The viability of the building was once in question during the proposed widening of Highway 151 and installation of a county sewer system designed to mitigate lake pollution.

The southwest corner of the crossing of Hwy 151 and W held a concrete block building until it was leveled in the 1980s to provide parking for an adjacent fire department. It was a lively gathering place during the 1960s and 1970s as a satellite auction center owned by the Danner family of Glenview, Illinois, but is remembered as a tractor and vehicle garage run for nearly 50 years by Edward Halfman. Regarded as the best mechanic in the Fond du Lac and Calumet area by area residents, consumers had their Ford Model T cars shipped to his garage in crates to be assembled, a cost-saving alternative to purchasing a fully assembled car from a dealer's lot. In his retirement years, Halfman repaired children's bikes and educated young adults about the care and maintenance of their cars.

On the northeast corner a small tavern and a large concrete block community hall that held a basketball court on its second floor was razed in the 1980s to make way for a modern bar and grill that features the taxidermy craft of its renter.

The southeast corner is a multi-family building but used to be a grocery and hardware store formerly run by the Schubert family, then sold in 1970 to Willard and Mary Hemauer who ran it until 1998.

The largest employer is located just beyond the southern end of Pipe. Groeschel Company, operated by descendants of Frank Groeschel, is a HVAC and sheet metal fabrication company.

Two miles east of Pipe is Blue Sky Green Field Wind Farm, an electric generation windmill farms. Surveys of wind patterns nationwide in the 1980s identified a potential windmill electric generation path along the Niagara Escarpment from Pipe toward Brownsville. At an average wind speed of 18 mph, this was considered uneconomical for the nascent wind power generation in the 1980s, but windmill rotor and turbine technology improvements and government incentives for optional energy sources at the dawn of the 21st century quickly transformed farming communities into an electric generation industry.

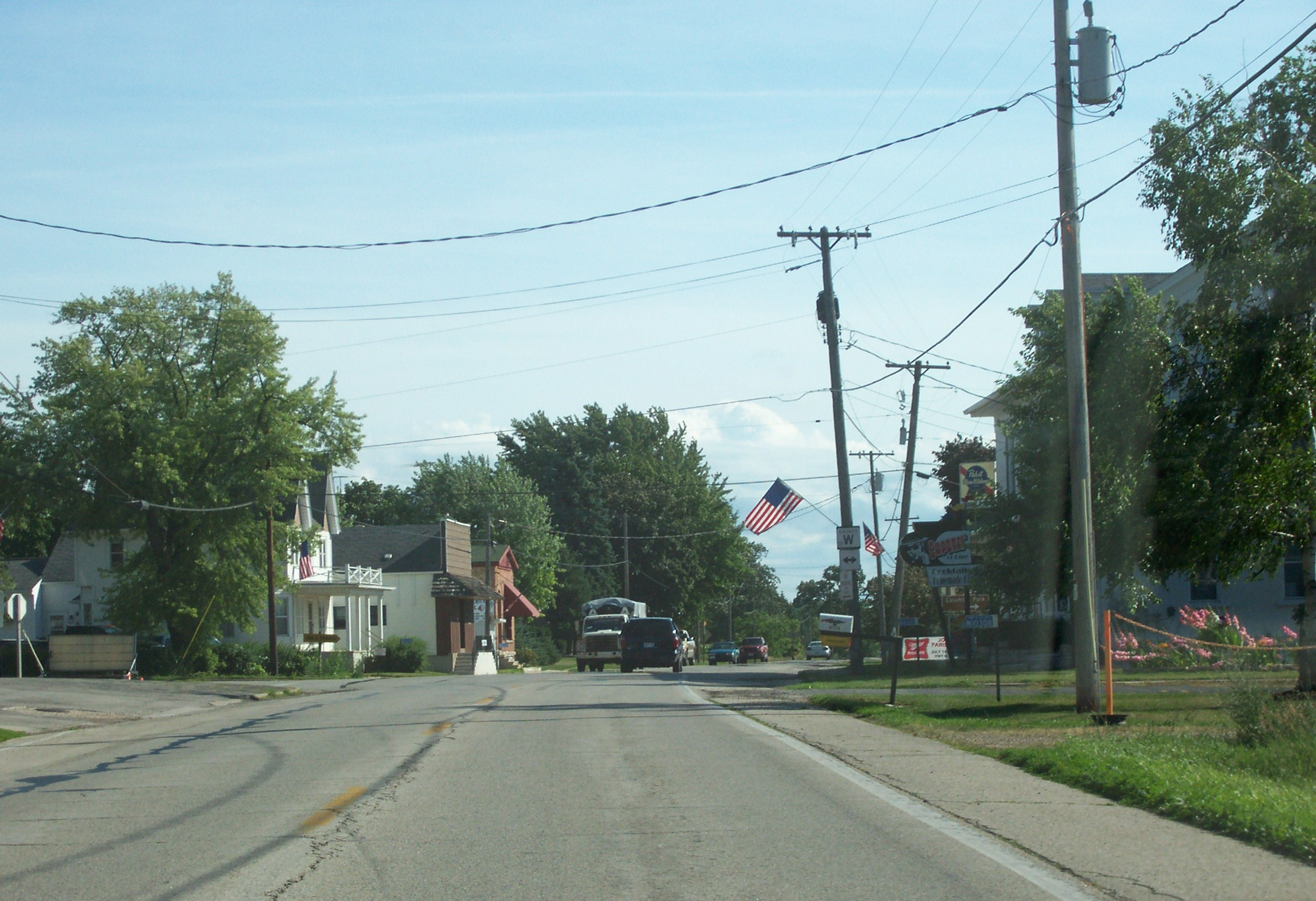
Looking south at Pipe along U.S. Route 151

== Transportation ==
Pipe is located on U.S. Route 151. Originally called Fort Howard Military Road, it was one of the first marked routes through the Wisconsin wilderness. The other main road into the community is the east-west County Highway W, which leads to the shore of Lake Winnebago. Cty Hwy W terminates at Calumet Harbor. The public harbor area is a popular regional recreational and camping area, and a boat and ice fishing launch.
