= Octagon House (Fond du Lac, Wisconsin) =

Historic house in Wisconsin, United States

- U.S. National Register of Historic Places
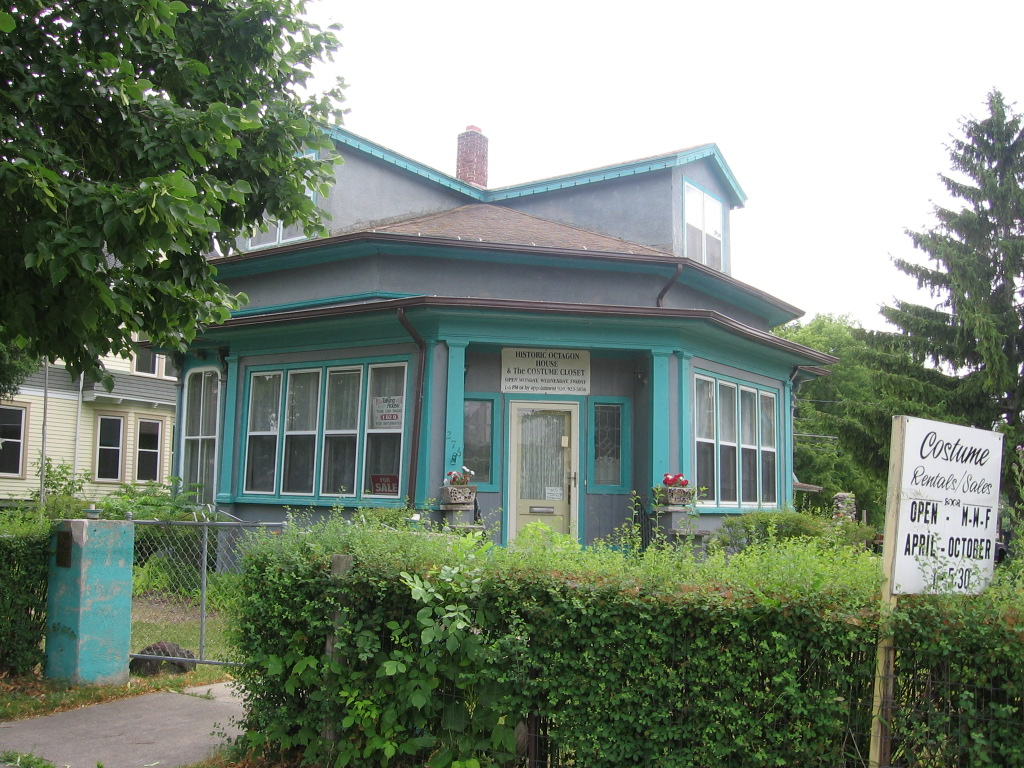

- Location within Wisconsin Location within the United States
- Location: 276 Linden St., Fond du Lac, Wisconsin, USA
- Coordinates: 43°46′16″N 88°26′54″W
- Built: 1856
- Architectural style: Octagon Mode
- NRHP reference No.: 72000051
- Added to NRHP: November 03, 1972

The Octagon House is a historic house located at 276 Linden Street in Fond du Lac, Wisconsin, USA. It was listed on the National Register of Historic Places in 1972. Along with the Wallace-Jagdfeld Octagon House, it is one of two Octagon Houses in Fond du Lac. The house was featured as the second-most haunted house in Wisconsin on the History Channel show "Hidden Passages".

== History ==
Isaac Brown, a carpenter and trader with Native Americans, reportedly grew fearful of attacks from them in 1856, so he built a house that was designed for hiding. An Orson Fowler-designed eight-sided structure, it contained nine secret passageways and spaces.

A tunnel was built between the house and a woodshed, which some have claimed used as a safe house on the Underground Railway. A small storage room beneath the front porch was supposedly used to hide the runaway slaves. This local lore has been disputed by historians.

Brown gave the house to his son Edwin A. Brown as a wedding present. The younger Brown and his wife Ruth Edward (Pier) Brown had three children in the house. The house became a rental unit in 1900, and remained so until the late 1960s to early 1970s.

Plans for a new high school threatened the house. Despite the house being on the National Register of Historic Places, no buyers were interested and it was days away from demolition. Local dressmaker and antiques dealer Marlene Hansen bought the house without viewing the interior. Hansen and her family restored the house, turning it into a historic and spooky tour house. In 2005 The Southern Wisconsin Paranormal Research Group studied the house and reported that they found paranormal activities there. "I can't tell what others have seen, felt, or experienced, but I can tell that they do experience something," Hansen said. "Their body language changes and I can see it in their faces." Her grandson, who often gives tours of the house, has said that visitors have reported hearing sounds, including small children laughing and playing, and feeling cold hands touching them. Some people believe that the children are Edwin Brown's children.

== Features ==
The house has stucco walls, with four dormers, and a central chimney. It is now a museum.
