= Northern Casket Company Building =

- U.S. National Register of Historic Places
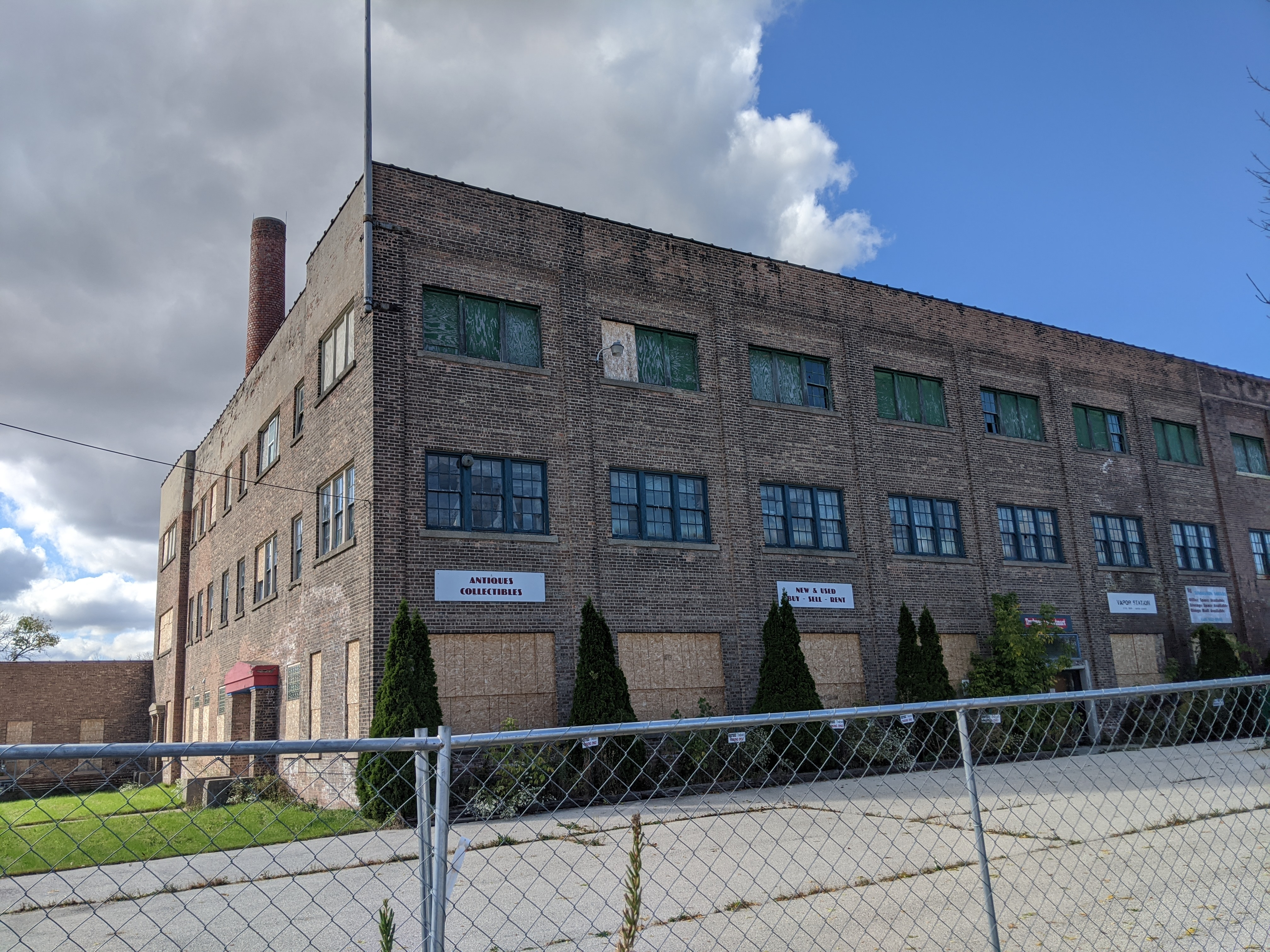

- Location within Wisconsin Location within the United States
- Location: 16 N. Brooke Street, Fond du Lac, Wisconsin
- Coordinates: 43.7794°N 88.4544°W
- Built: 1892 (with additions in 1910, 1920, 1927, 1950)
- Architect: Joseph E. Hennen
- Architectural style: Late 19th And Early 20th Century American Movements
- NRHP reference No.: 100003303
- Added to NRHP: January 11, 2019

The Northern Casket Company Building is an historic building located at 16 N. Brooke Street in Fond du Lac, Wisconsin. The building was listed on the National Register of Historic Places on January 11, 2019.

== National Register of Historic Places ==
The building is noted as a rare intact factory from the 1919 era. Most of the architectural elements were unmodified, except for a few windows. The building was the best surviving local example of a late-nineteenth and early-twentieth century casket factory and an important building representative of Fond du Lac's industrial past.

The city of Fond du Lac was making a concerted effort to develop the area starting in 2018. It had foreclosed on two of three tax delinquent parcels with plans to develop the site as a residential property. As of December 2019, the city was working on an eminent domain court proceeding to purchase a third parcel which was not tax delinquent.

== Fire ==
The building experienced what local firefighters described as a "major fire" on June 2, 2020. A police officer noticed smoke at 2:45 a.m. The building was considered abandoned at the time of the fire. Multiple fire crews arrived and their efforts were slowed by a water main break.
