= St. Matthias Mission =

Historic church in Wisconsin, United States

- U.S. National Register of Historic Places
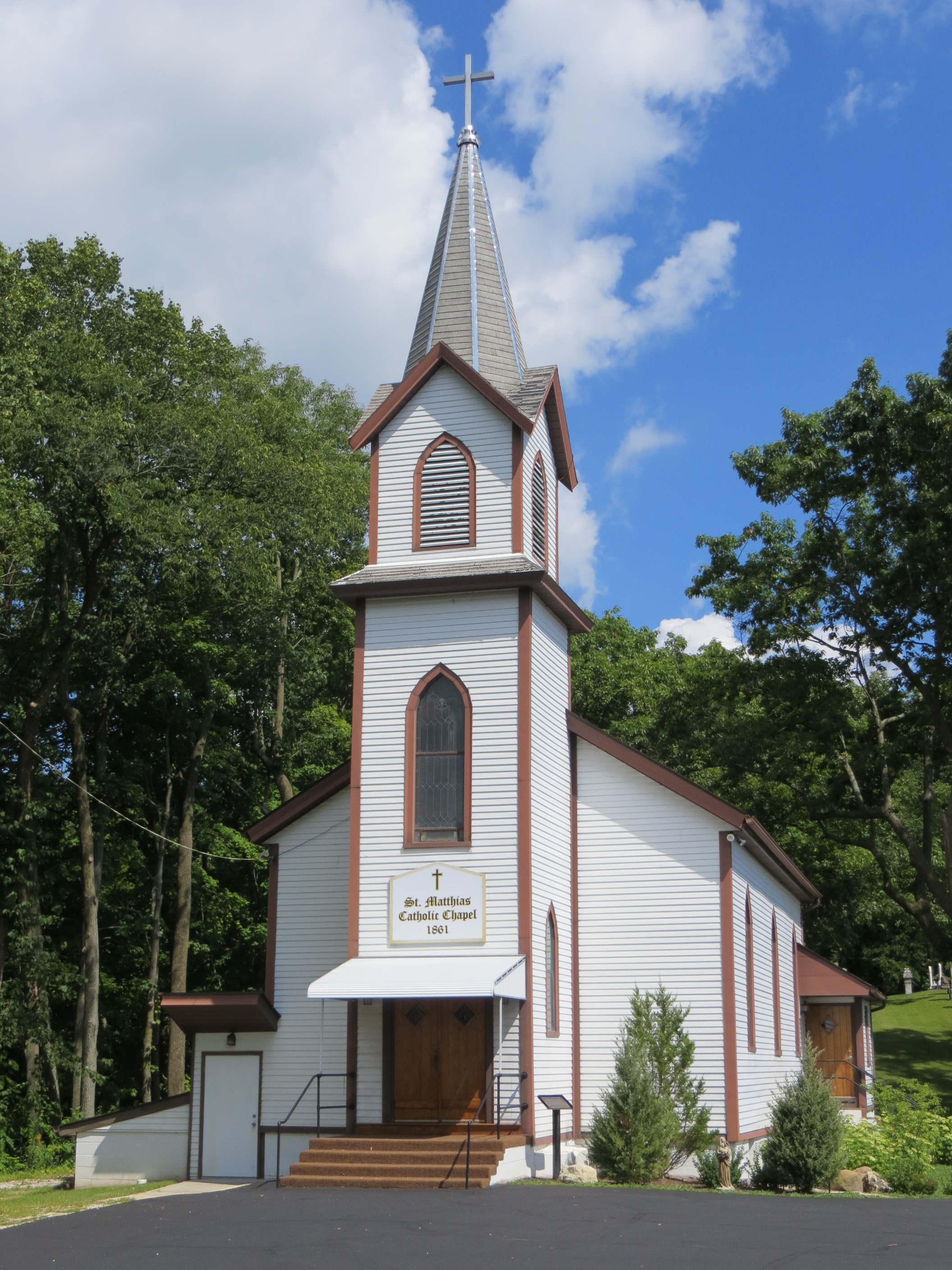
- St. Matthias Mission
- Location: 1081 County Trunk S New Fane, Wisconsin
- Coordinates: 43.57889°N 88.17482°W
- Built: 1861
- Architectural style: Carpenter Gothic
- NRHP reference No.: 88001838
- Added to NRHP: October 13, 1988

St. Matthias Mission is a historic rural Catholic mission church located near New Fane, Wisconsin. It was added to the National Register of Historic Places in 1988.

In the 1850s a cluster of immigrants from Bengel in the Rhineland settled around what is now called New Fane, engaging in farming. In 1861, 24 of these German-Catholic families built the nave of St. Matthias, of logs. At the consecration in 1863 the collection totaled 98 cents.

For the first ten years St. Matthias was served by Rev. John (Johann Baptist) Reindl (1827–1891) of Immaculate Conception in West Bend. Some time before 1888 the log walls were covered with milled weatherboard.

In 1888 the tower was added, with a frame of vertical posts and cross-timbers connected by mortise and tenon. Like the main church body, it is sheathed in weatherboard. In the tower hangs an 1883 bell and on top stands a cross.

The church is currently taken care of by a private foundation. The interior of the church has been fully restored to its original condition and configuration.

The church has regular late Sunday masses in the summer and a regular first Saturday mass every monthly. The local pastor from Holy Trinity Parish in Kewaskum, WI serves St. Matthias, as in the past.
