= El Dorado Apartments (El Dorado, Arkansas) =

- U.S. National Register of Historic Places
- U.S. Historic district – Contributing property
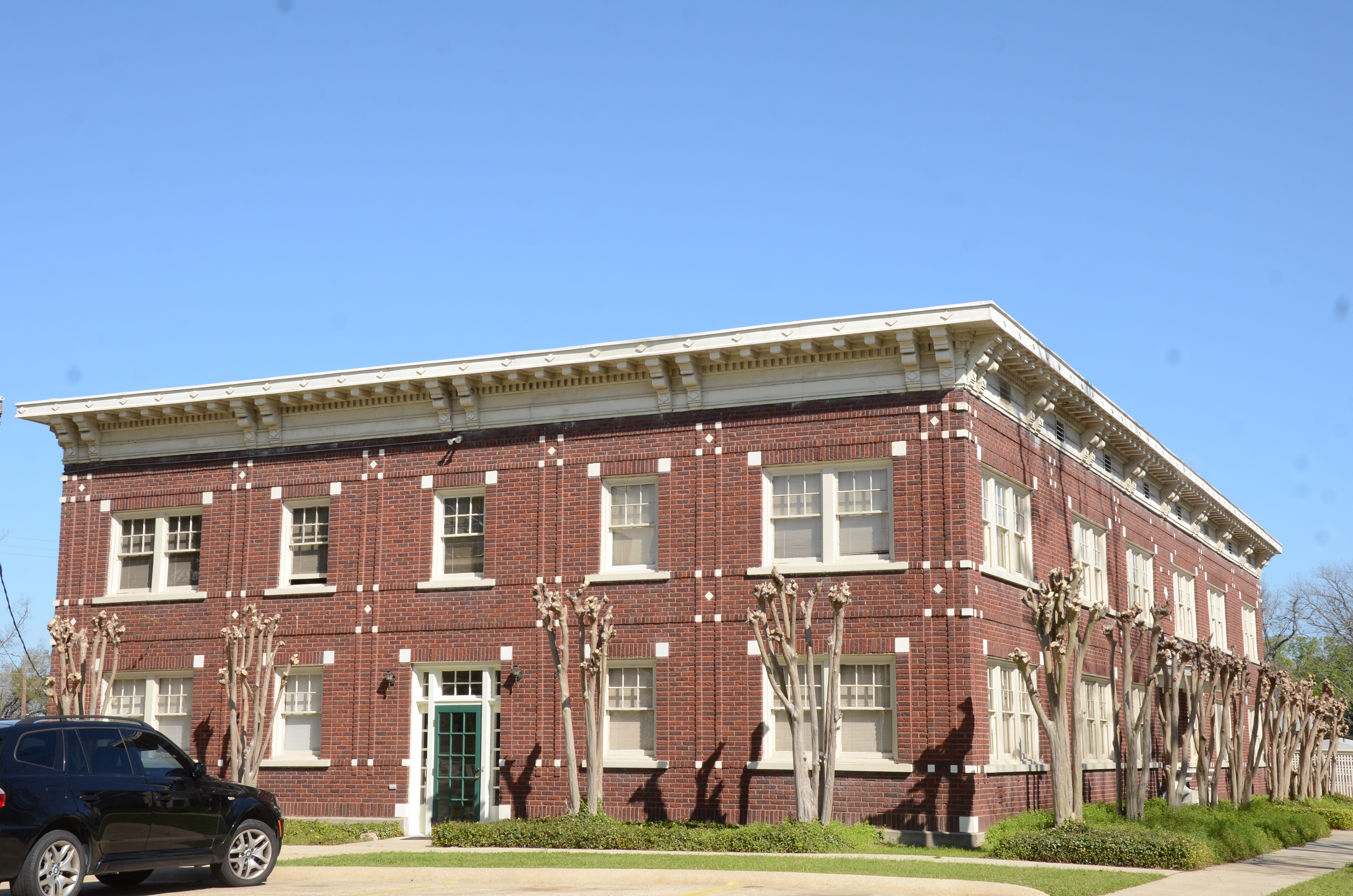
- El Dorado Apartments in 2016

- Location within Arkansas Location within the United States
- Location: 420 Wilson Pl., El Dorado, Arkansas
- Coordinates: 33°12′22″N 92°39′37″W
- Area: less than one acre
- Built: 1926
- Architect: James Saye Smith, Cheshir Peyton
- Part of: Murphy-Hill Historic District (ID07000974)
- NRHP reference No.: 83003549

Significant dates
- Added to NRHP: December 1, 1983
- Designated CP: September 20, 2007

The El Dorado Apartments in El Dorado, Arkansas are a historic apartment house at 420 Wilson Place. The two story brick and limestone building was designed by Louisiana architect Cheshire Peyton, and built in 1926 in response to the discovery of oil in the area and the ensuing economic boom. It houses 24 small efficiency units, designed for use by the transient but wealthier workers and managers of the oil-related economy. The building has limestone window sills, and rows of brick-inlaid limestone squares between the windows. The cornice of the flat roof is decorated with brick dentil moulding and modillions.

The building was listed on the National Register of Historic Places in 1983, and included in the Murphy-Hill Historic District in 2007.

== See also ==
- National Register of Historic Places listings in Union County, Arkansas
