= Wallace-Jagdfeld Octagon House =

Historic house in Wisconsin, United States

- U.S. National Register of Historic Places
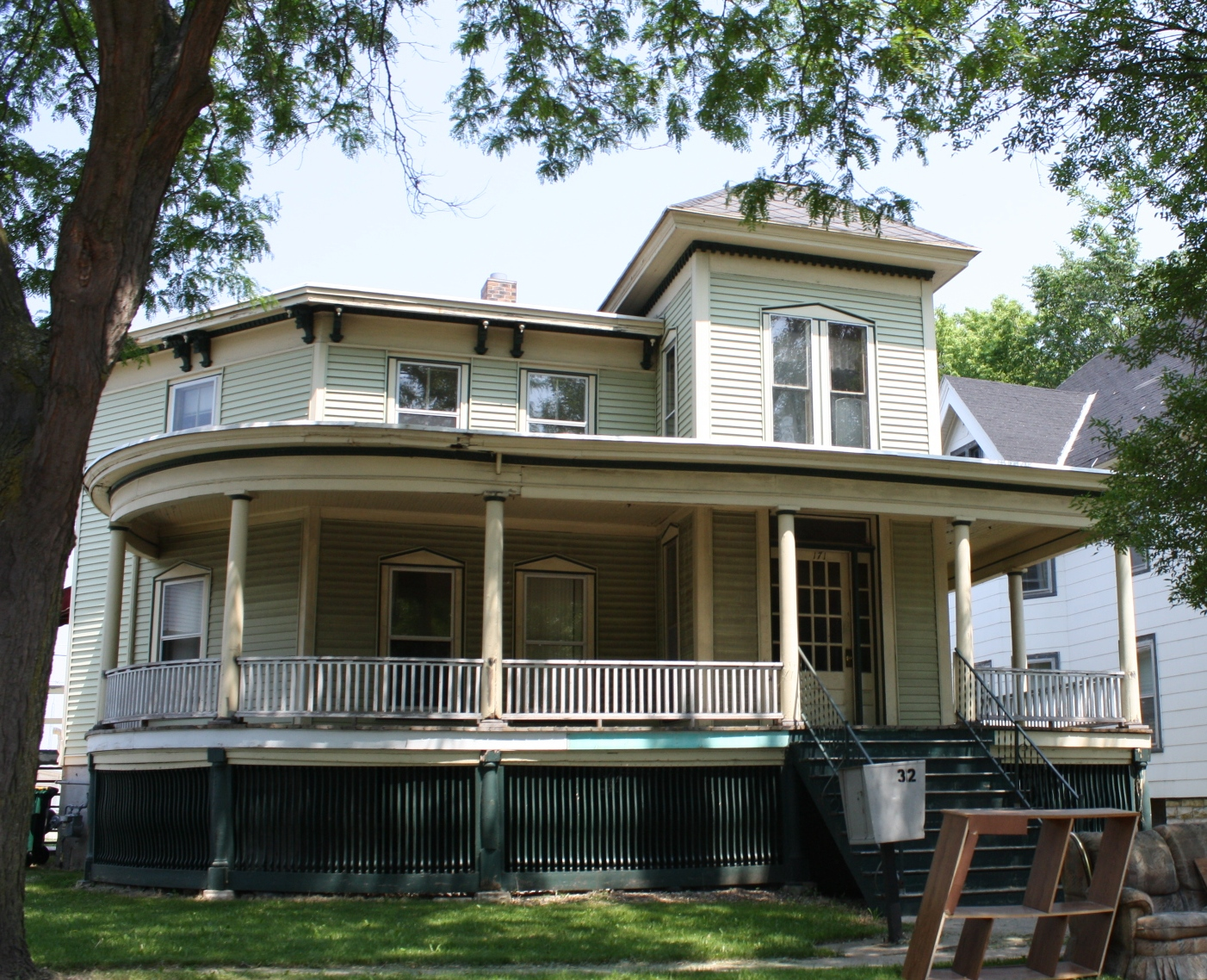

- Location within Wisconsin Location within the United States
- Location: 171 Forest Ave., Fond du Lac, Wisconsin
- Coordinates: 43°46′44″N 88°27′13″W
- Built: 1860
- Architectural style: Octagon Mode
- NRHP reference No.: 02000416
- Added to NRHP: April 26, 2002

The Wallace-Jagdfeld Octagon House built in 1860 is a historic octagonal house located at 171 Forest Avenue in Fond du Lac, Wisconsin. The two-story home features clapboard siding, a front porch, and a central chimney.

On April 26, 2002, it was added to the National Register of Historic Places, becoming the second octagon house in Fond du Lac on the National Register along with the Fond du Lac Octagon House. It is located across the street from two other listings on the National Register, Hotel Calumet and the Chicago and Northwestern Railroad Depot.

== See also ==
- Octagon House (Fond du Lac, Wisconsin), located at 276 Linden Street
