= New Fane, Wisconsin =

- Unincorporated community
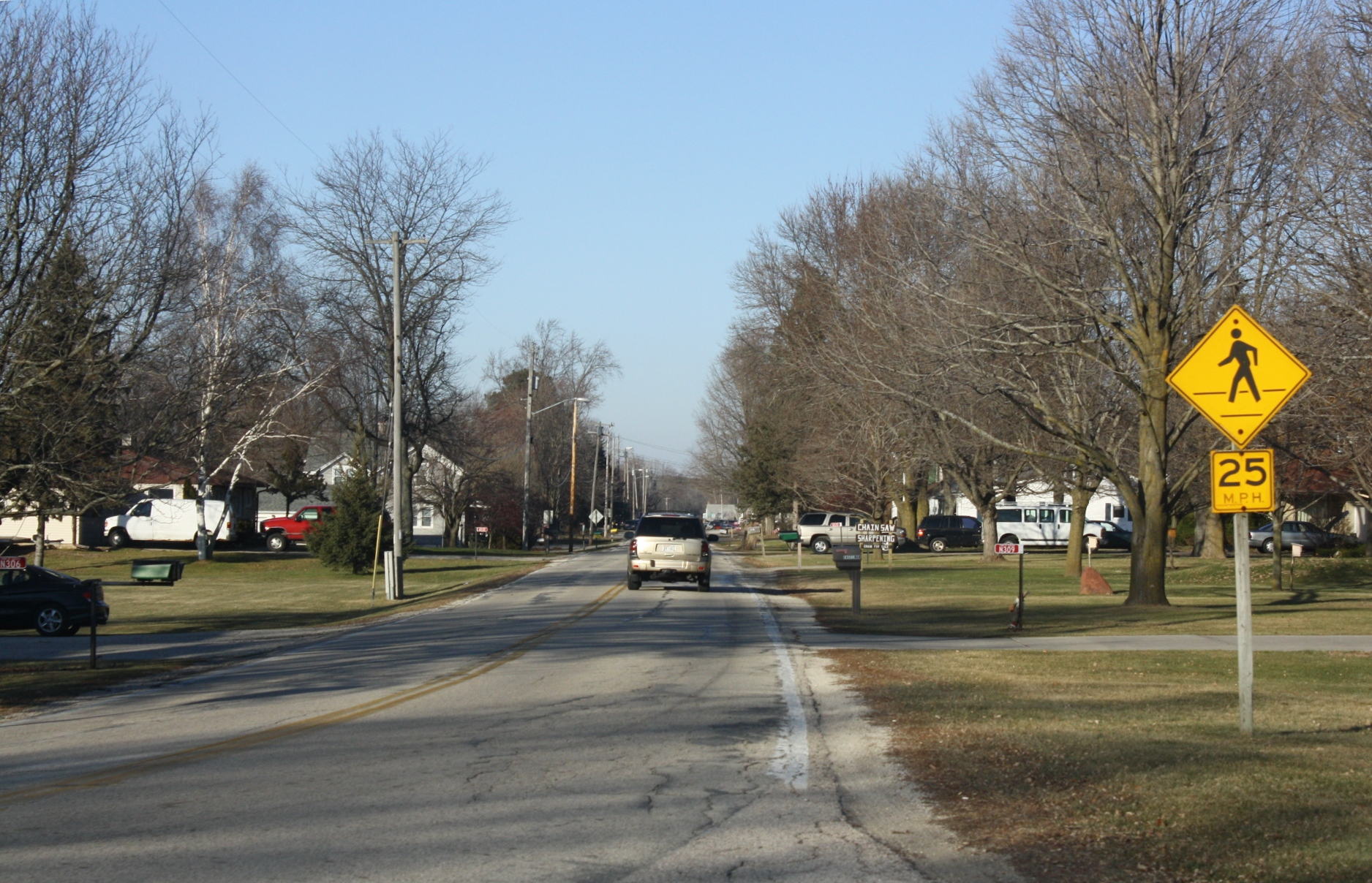
- Looking north at New Fane

- Location within Wisconsin Location within the United States
- Coordinates: 43°33′18″N 88°11′09″W
- Country: United States
- State: Wisconsin
- County: Fond du Lac
- Elevation: 978 ft (298 m)
- Time zone: UTC-6 (Central (CST))
  - Summer (DST): UTC-5 (CDT)
- Zip codes: 53040
- Area code: 262
- GNIS feature ID: 1570212

New Fane is an unincorporated community in the Town of Auburn in Fond du Lac County, Wisconsin, United States. The community is located in the heart of the northern unit of the Kettle Moraine State Forest on County Roads S and DD.

== History ==
The first settler to the area was Andrew Eble, who came from Milwaukee in 1855 and built a sawmill on the East Branch of the Milwaukee River. He gave his name to the community known as Ebleville before he died in an accidental shooting in 1859. At around the same time, a neighboring area was settled by people from Newfane, New York, and were granted a post office in 1852. In 1875, the New Fane post office was moved to Ebleville, and this area became known as New Fane. The post office was eventually removed in 1909.

In 1859, the first Lutheran church services were held in the community, and a congregation was formed in 1861. St. Johannes Church was built in 1871 from stones found in the area; the name was later changed to St. John Evangelical Lutheran Church.

The dam on the Milwaukee River at New Fane was removed in 2001. The removal has been credited with creating new habitat for the longear sunfish.

New Fane is home to St. John Lutheran Church, built in 1871.

St. Matthias Mission is located near New Fane.
