= Saint John Evangelical Lutheran Church (New Fane, Wisconsin) =

Historic church in Wisconsin, United States

- U.S. National Register of Historic Places
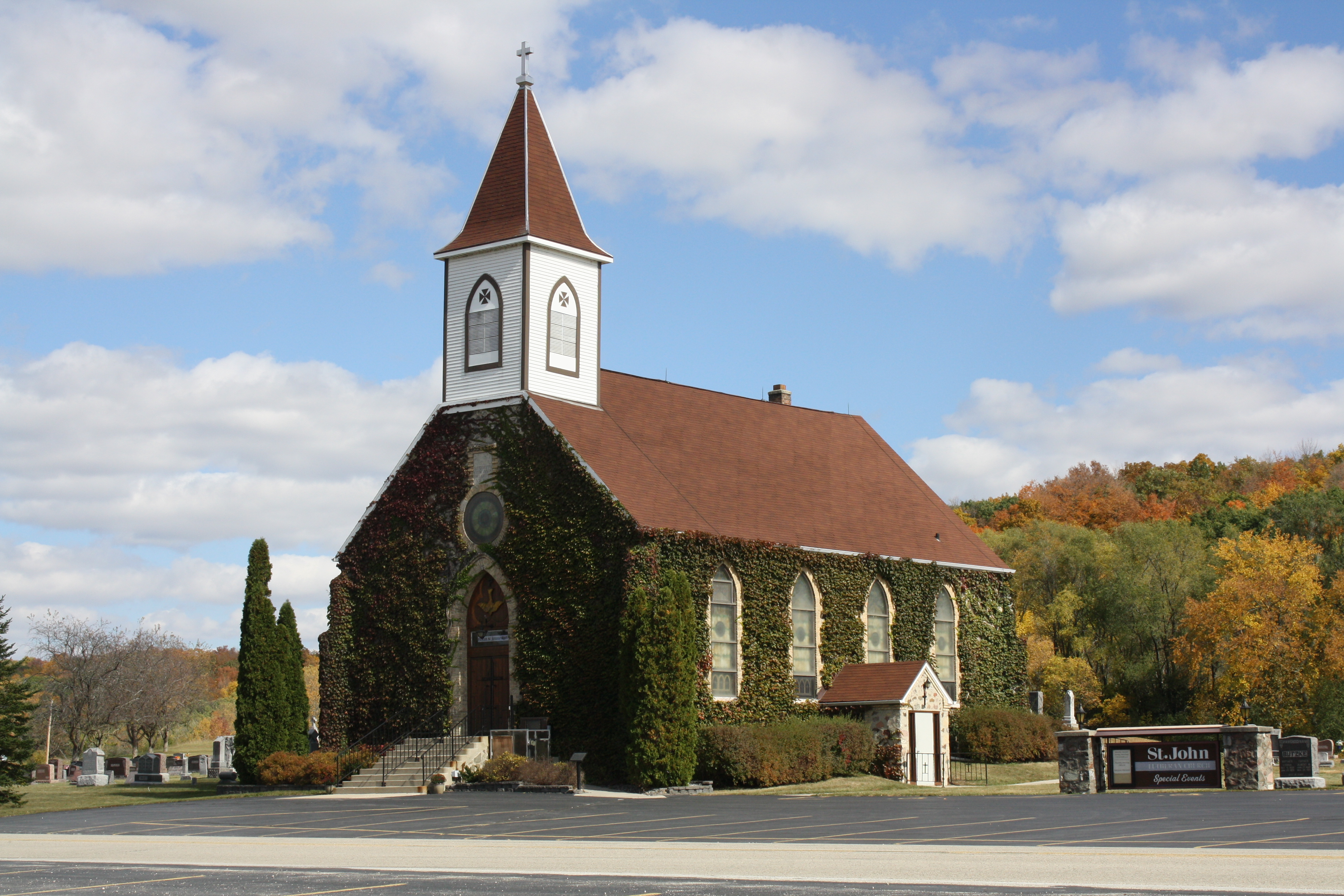
- Saint John Evangelical Lutheran Church

- Location within Wisconsin Location within the United States
- Location: 670 County Trunk Hwy. S, New Fane, Wisconsin
- Coordinates: 43°33′52″N 88°10′59″W
- Area: less than one acre
- Built: 1870
- Architect: Lampert & Beck
- Architectural style: Gothic
- NRHP reference No.: 86000794
- Added to NRHP: April 15, 1986

Saint John Evangelical Lutheran Church is located in New Fane, Wisconsin. It was added to the National Register of Historic Places in 1986. The church is affiliated with the Lutheran Church–Missouri Synod.

== History ==
The church was built with stone from what would become the Kettle Moraine State Forest. In the 1920s, the church steeple was struck by lightning was replaced with one smaller in height. The church underwent a change of its name in 1965, changing from The German Lutheran Church: St. Johannes to its current name.
