= Loyal Order of Moose =

American fraternal organizations

Moose International
- Founder: Henry Wilson
- Type: 501(c)(8)
- Tax ID no.: 36-1408120
- Legal status: Nonprofit fraternal organization
- Headquarters: Mooseheart, Illinois, U.S.
- Coordinates: 41.826847°N 88.329017°W
- Chief Executive Officer: Scott D. Hart
- Director of Membership: Frank Vorhees
- Chief Financial Officer: Kristen Peterson
- Chief Compliance Officer: Rick King
- Subsidiaries: Moose Charities, Inc _{(501(c)(3)}, Mooseheart Child City & School, Inc _{(501(c)(3))}, Moosehaven, Inc _{(501(c)(3))}, Moose Foundation, Inc _{(501(c)(3))}, Moose Title Holding Company _{(501(c)(2)}, Lodgic Holdings, Inc _{(501(c)(3))}, Lodging Workplace, Inc _{(501(c)(3))}, Fraternal Insurance Company _{(for-profit captive insurance company)}, NA Lodging 1, LLC _{(LLC hotel owner/operator)}, Clever Moose at Lodgic, Inc _{(for-profit restaurant)}
- Revenue: $55,183,652 (2020)
- Expenses: $57,305,039 (2020)
- Endowment: $200,464,373 _{(2020)}
- Employees: 150 (2019)
- Volunteers: 500 (2019)
- Website: www.mooseintl.org

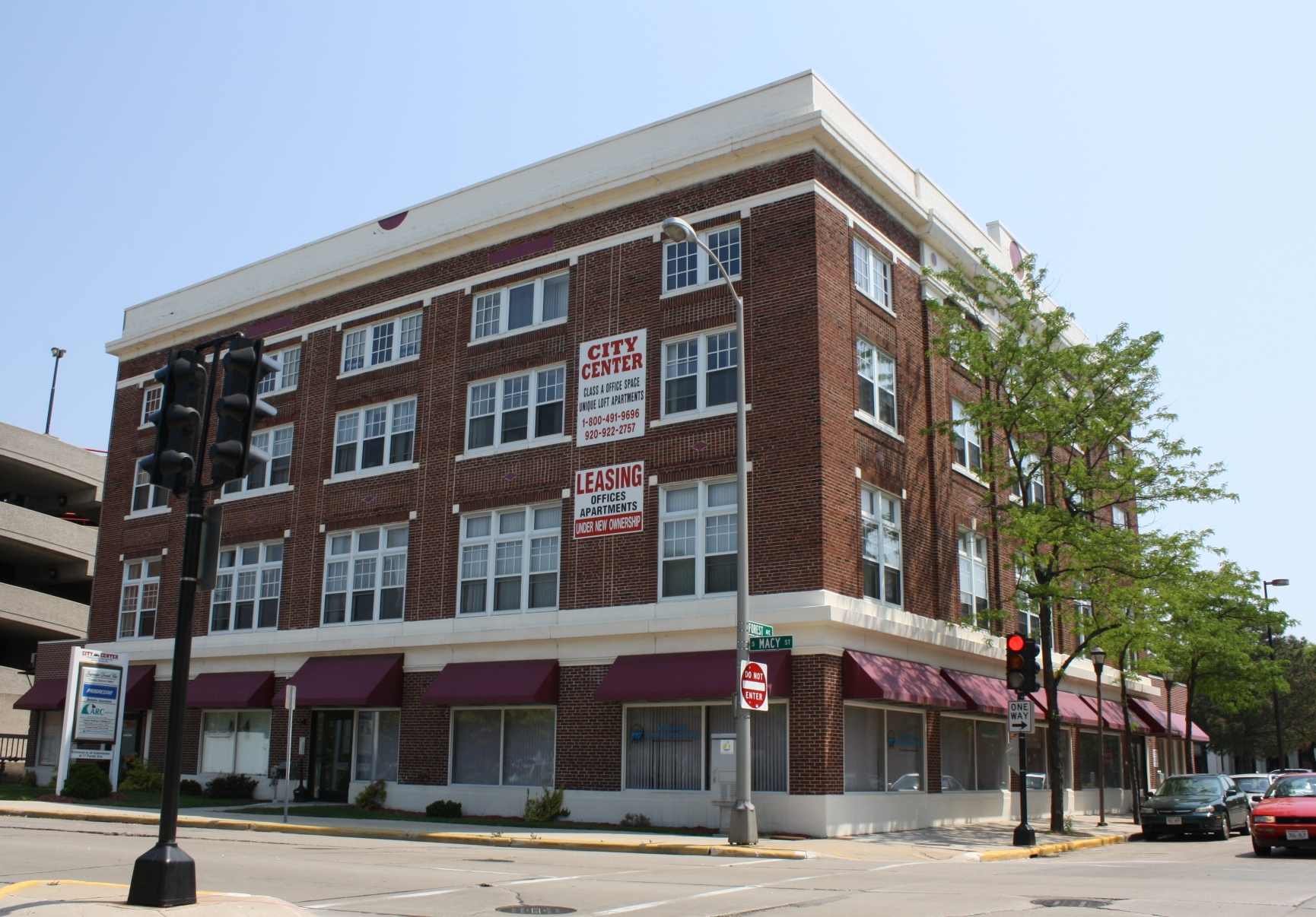
Lodge 281, Fond du Lac, Wisconsin

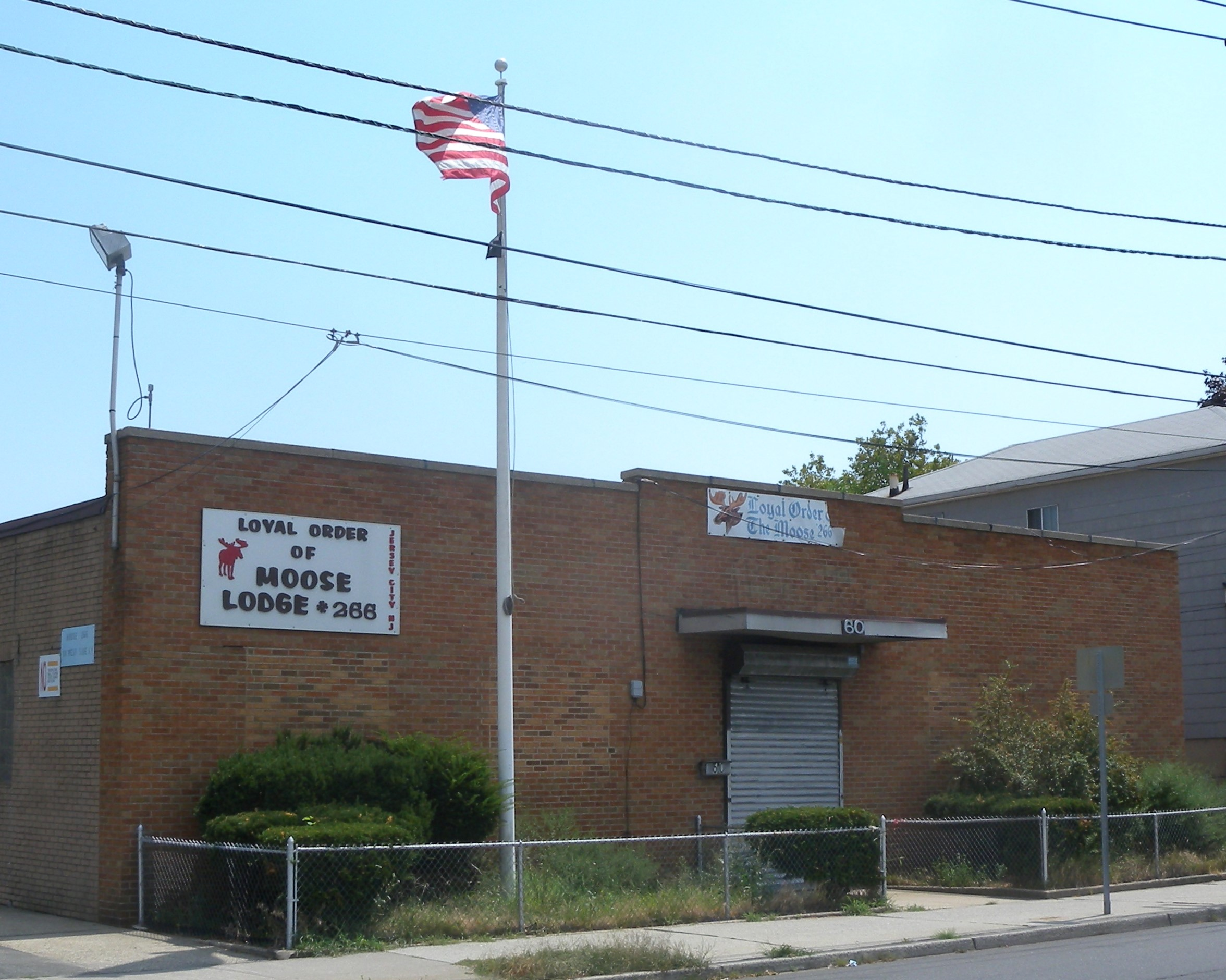
Lodge 266, Jersey City, New Jersey

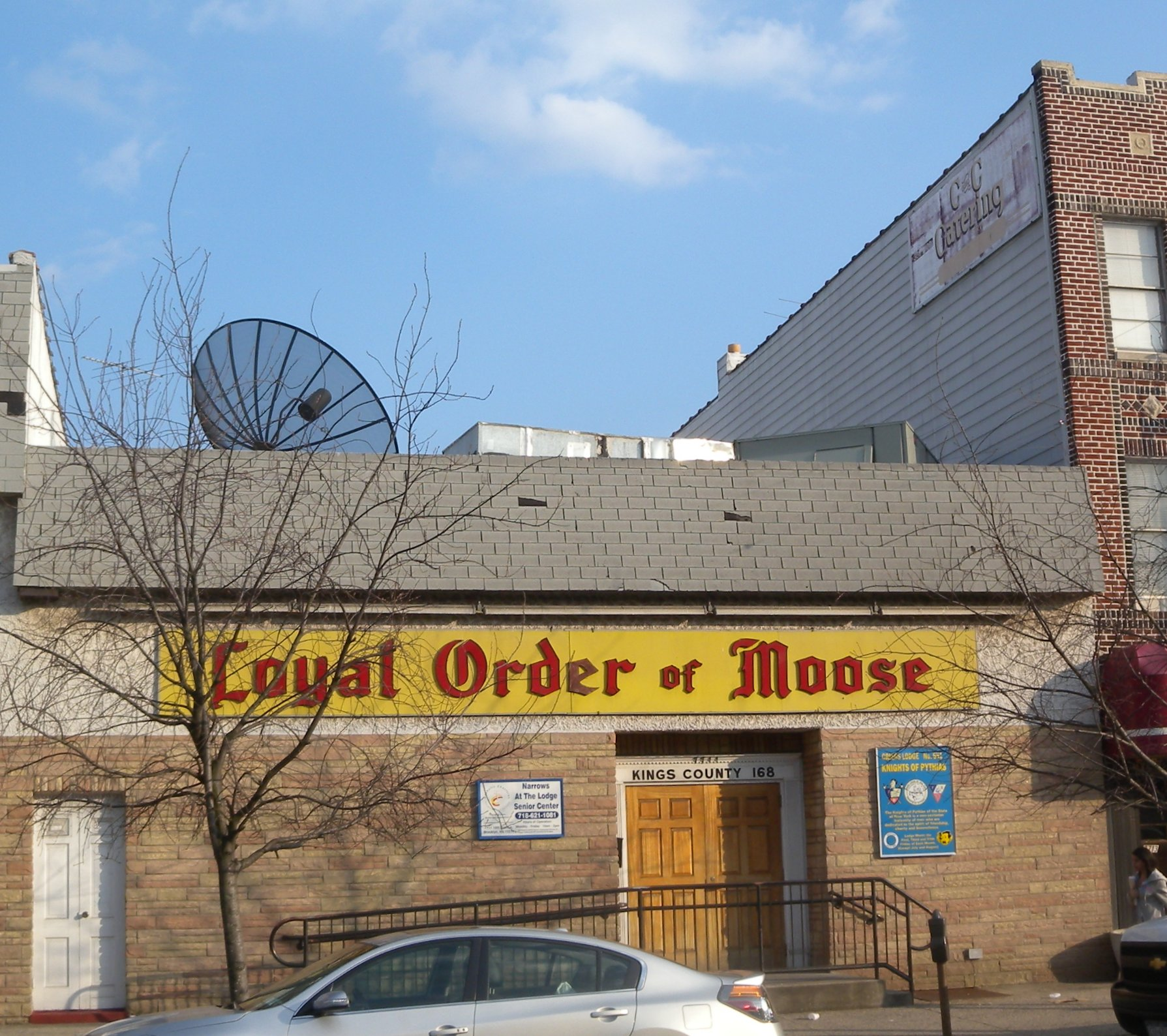
Lodge 168, Brooklyn, New York

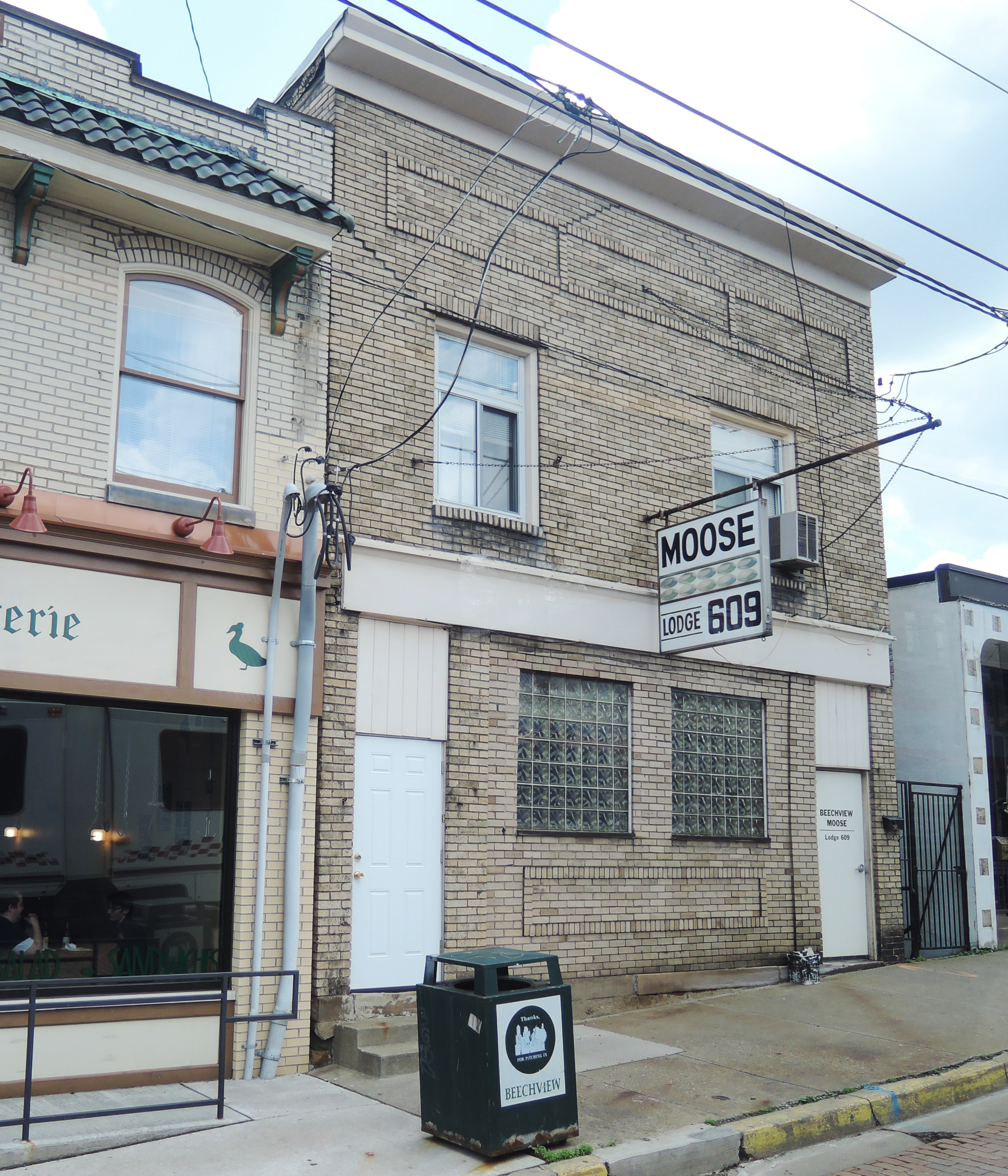
Pittsburgh

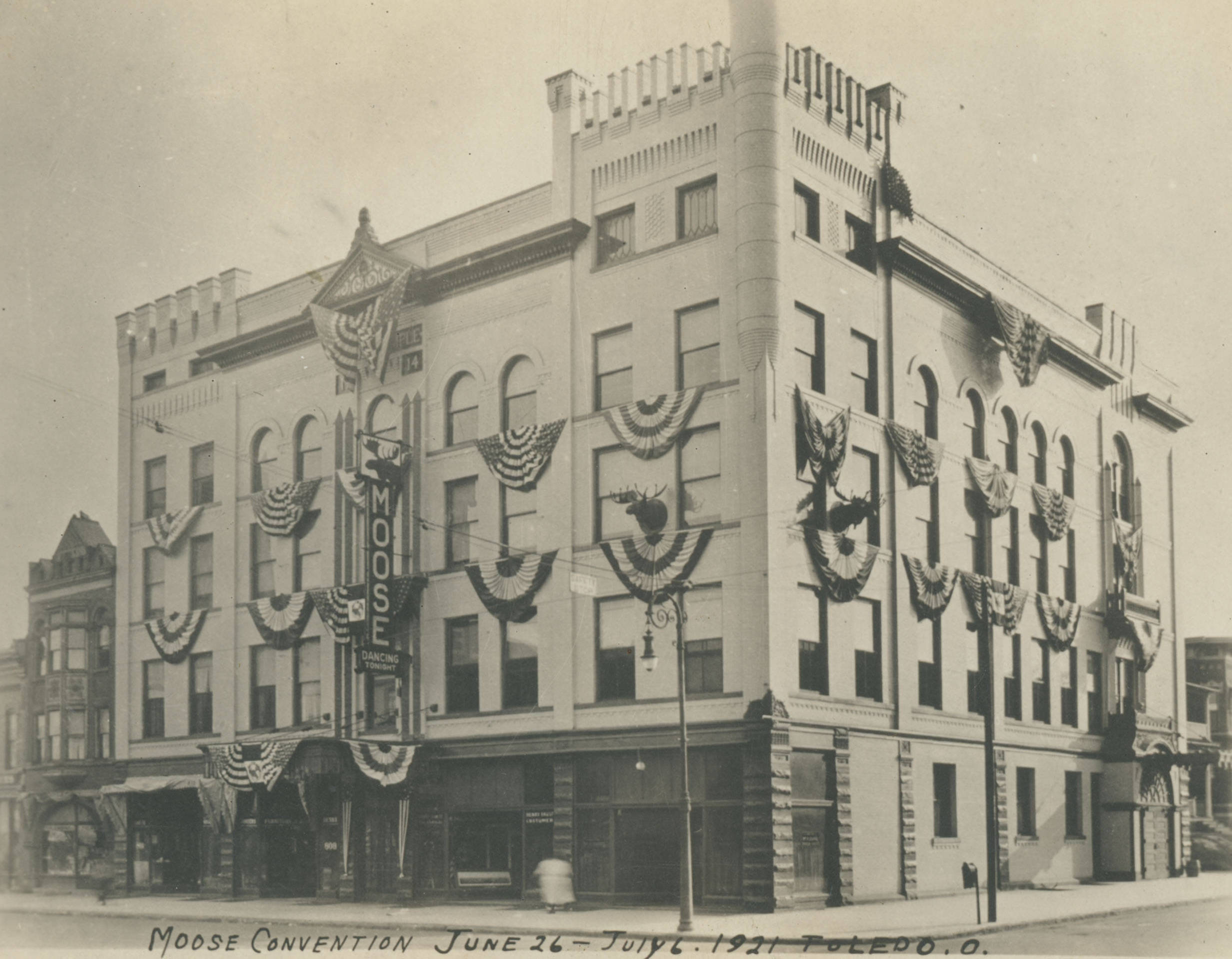
Moose Convention, Toledo, Ohio

The Moose Fraternity (formerly The Loyal Order of Moose) is a fraternal and service organization founded in 1888 and headquartered in Mooseheart, Illinois.

Moose International supports the operation of Mooseheart Child City & School, a 1,023-acre (414 ha) community for children and teens in need, located 40 miles (64 km) west of Chicago; and Moosehaven, a 63-acre (25 ha) retirement community for its members near Jacksonville, Florida.

Additionally, the Moose organization conducts numerous sports and recreational programs, in local Lodge/Chapter facilities called either Moose Family Centers or Activity Centers, in the majority of 44 State and Provincial Associations, and on a fraternity-wide basis. There is also a Loyal Order of Moose in Britain. These organizations together make up the Moose International.

== History ==
The Loyal Order of Moose was founded in Louisville, Kentucky, in the spring of 1888 by Dr. John Henry Wilson. Originally intended purely as a men's social club, lodges were soon founded in Cincinnati, Ohio; St. Louis, Missouri; and Crawfordsville and Frankfort, Indiana. The early order was not prosperous. Dr. Wilson was dissatisfied and left the order of the Moose before the turn of the century. When Albert C. Stevens was compiling his Cyclopedia of Fraternities in the late 1890s, he was unable to ascertain whether it was still in existence.

In the fall of 1906, the Order had only the two Indiana lodges remaining. On October 27 of that year James J. Davis became the 247th member of the Order. Davis was a Welsh immigrant who had come to the United States as a youth and worked as an iron puddler in the steel mills of Pennsylvania and an active labor organizer (he later became United States Secretary of Labor in the Harding administration). He saw the Order as a way to provide a social safety net for a working class membership, using a low annual membership fee of $10–$15 (equivalent to $360–$540 in 2025). After giving a rousing address to the seven delegates of the 1906 Moose national convention, he was appointed "Supreme Organizer" of the Order. Davis and a group of organizers set out to recruit members and establish lodges throughout the US and Canada. He was quite successful, and the Order grew to nearly half a million members in 1,000 lodges by 1912.

=== Racial discrimination ===
Old National Moose Lodge bylaws restricted membership in this men's club to white people. In 1972, K. Leroy Irvis, an African-American member of the Pennsylvania House of Representatives, was invited to visit a lodge in Harrisburg by a member as a guest. The lodge dining room refused to serve Irvis on account of his race. Irvis sued the Pennsylvania Liquor Control Board in federal court, arguing that the issuance of a liquor license to an organization with racially discriminatory policies constituted an illegal state action. A Pennsylvania court ruled in Irvis' favor. The case was ultimately appealed to the Supreme Court of the United States, which ruled that Irvis lacked standing to sue based on membership and that state was not involved in the discriminatory guest practices to qualify as a state action prohibited by the Fourteenth Amendment. While the Loyal Order of Moose won the case, their national organization nevertheless removed their whites-only policy in 1973.

In 1994, a Moose Lodge in Hagerstown, Maryland, denied membership based on race. Officials at Moose International took action and revoked the charter of the Moose Lodge.

=== Mooseheart and Moosehaven ===
At the 1911 convention in Detroit, Davis, the "Director General" of the Order, recommended that the LOOM (Loyal Order Of Moose) acquire property for an "Institute", "School" or "College" that would be a home, schooling, and vocational training for the orphans of LOOM members. For months offers came in and a number of meetings were held regarding the project. It was eventually agreed that the center should be located somewhere near the center of population, adjacent to both rail and river transportation and within a day's travel to a major city. On December 14, 1912, the leaders of the organization decided to purchase the 750-acre Brookline Farm. Brookline was a dairy farm near Batavia, Illinois. It was close to the Fox River, two railway lines and the (then dirt) Lincoln Highway. The leadership also wished to buy additional real estate to the west and north owned by two other families, for a total of 1,023 acres. Negotiations for the purchases were held in January and February 1913, and legal possession of the property was taken on March 1. The name "Mooseheart" had been adopted for the school at the suggestion of Ohio Congressman and Supreme Council member John J. Lentz by a unanimous joint meeting of the Supreme Council and Institute Trustees on February 1. Mooseheart was dedicated on July 27, 1913. Vice President Thomas R. Marshall gave a speech for the occasion.

While Mooseheart began as a school, it soon grew to become a small incorporated village and hub of the organization, housing the headquarters of the LOOM as well as the Women of the Moose. The population of Mooseheart would grow to 1,000 by 1920, reach a peak of 1,300 during the Great Depression, and decline to approximately 500, the campus' current maximum capacity, in 1979.

In addition to Mooseheart, the Moose Fraternity also runs a retirement center, Moosehaven, located in Orange Park, Florida. This project was inaugurated in the autumn of 1922 with 26 acres of property and 22 retired Moose residents. It has grown to a 63-acre community with over 400 residents.

== Organization ==
Local units are called "Lodges", regional groups are "Associations" and the national authority is "The Moose", which meets annually. In 1923 there were 1,669 lodges "promulgated in every civilized country controlled by the Caucasian race". In 1966 3,500 lodges were reported in every US state, Guam, Canada, Bermuda and England. In 1979 the Order had 36 State Associations and over 4,000 Lodges. Today it has 1,600 Lodges in 49 states, four Canadian provinces, and the United Kingdom.

The entire membership is sometimes referred to as the "Moose Domain".

== Membership ==
Until at least the 1970s, membership was restricted to white men of "sound mind and body, in good standing in the community, engaged in lawful business who are able to speak and write the English language". In June 1972 the Supreme Court of the United States handed down a decision partially in the Order's favor, saying that a Moose Lodge in Harrisburg, Pennsylvania, need not have its state liquor license revoked because it refused to serve a Black guest, but that the state could subsequently condition its license on nondiscriminatory practices.

In the early 1920s, the LOOM reportedly had over half a million members, with 32,570 in the Mooseheart Legion and 5,178 in the Junior Order of Moose.

Membership
Year	Members
1928	650,000
1966	1,000,000
1979	1,323,240
2013	800,000
2021	650,000

== Rituals ==
An important ritual for the Moose is the "9 o'clock Ceremony". At nine o'clock, all Moose are directed to face toward Mooseheart with bowed heads and folded arms and repeat a silent prayer "Let the little children come unto me, do not keep them away. For they are like the Kingdom of Heaven. God bless Mooseheart." At that same time the children of Mooseheart kneel at their bedside in prayers as well. There are also the ten "thou shalts". These begin with "Thou shalt believe in God and worship Him as thy conscience dictates. Thou shalt be tolerant to let others worship each in his own way". Other "thou shalts" pertain to patriotism, service to fellowmen, protection of the weak, avoidance of slander to a brother Moose, love of the LOM, faithfulness and humility

James Davis drew up the initiation ritual for the order. It is relatively short, usually taking 45 minutes. The governor of the lodge asks the Sergeant-at-Arms to administer the Moose obligation. After candidates are asked if they believe in a Supreme Being, and if they are willing to assume the obligation they take the oath with their left hand on their heart and their right hand raised. Among other things, this obligation pledges the candidate not to "communicate or disclose or give any information—concerning anything—I may hereafter hear, see or experience in this lodge or in any other Lodge". At this point, the lodge performs the 9 o'clock ceremony, and then the lodge chaplain or prelate explains the ten "thou shalts". Next, the governor grasps the hands of the candidates while the members sing Blest Be the Tie that Binds. Finally, the governor administers the second part of the obligation, the candidates promise to support Mooseheart and Moosehaven, help fellow Moose, settle disputes within the order, and not join any unauthorized Moose organizations. The prelate offers another prayer at the altar, and all then join in singing Friendship We Now Extend.

There are also death and graveside services, granted on request of the family of deceased Moose, as well as a Memorial Day ceremony every first Sunday in May. The lodge altar is draped in black and white cloth, a Bible, a flower and drapes are placed on the lodge charter and the lodge prelate leads the members in prayers and the singing of Nearer, My God, to Thee. After the Moose unified its male and female members under the "One Moose" banner, many of the original LOOM (now called the Lodge) rituals were removed from required meeting practices.

=== Gustin–Kenny incident ===
On July 24, 1913, two candidates for LOOM membership, Donald A. Kenny and Christopher Gustin, died during their initiation ceremony in Birmingham, Alabama. Kenny was the president of the local Chauffeurs Union, and Gustin was an iron moulder. Both men were made to look upon a red hot emblem of the Order, and then blindfolded and disrobed and have a chilled rubber version of the emblem applied to their chests while a magneto was attached to their legs and an electric current was applied to them by a wire to their shoulders. The aim was evidently to make them believe that they were being branded. Both men fainted, but, as it was thought that they were feigning, the lodge officers did not stop the initiation until it was evident that the two were dying and the lodge physician was unable to revive them.

== Benefits and philanthropy ==
The LOOM has historically supported numerous charitable and civic activities. It has sponsored medical research for muscular dystrophy, cerebral palsy, cancer and cardiology, as well as the March of Dimes. It has also supported Boy Scout and Girl Scout programs.

Moose distributed a recruiting video, filmed in 2000, called Unbelievably Cool.

== Independent, Benevolent and Protective Order of Moose ==
In 1925, the LOOM brought a suit against the Independent, Benevolent and Protective Order of Moose, an African American order. They attempted to obtain a legal injunction to keep them from using the Moose name, ritual, emblem and titles of its officers. The New York Supreme Court found that the evidence presented by the Loyal Order of Moose was inadmissible, and it found in favor of the Independent, Benevolent and Protective Order of Moose.

In another lawsuit heard by a Maryland Circuit Court, the Loyal Order of Moose sued the Independent, Benevolent and Protective Order of Moose, saying they had infringed on its intellectual property by using the word "moose" in its name, by using the moose in its emblem, and by having similar rituals. The court found that the two organizations' emblems and part of their rituals were virtually identical, and the court restrained the African American order from using the word "moose" in its name. The court allowed the Independent, Benevolent and Protective Order of Moose to continue using the same fraternal titles and colors.

The IBPOOM was an unrelated all-African woman order.

== Religious objections ==
By 1966, the Lutheran Church–Missouri Synod and the Wisconsin Synod forbade membership in the Loyal Order of Moose. The Catholic Church, however, has never explicitly objected to the Moose, despite having condemned similar organizations, such as the Freemasons, for their oaths and other rituals. Papal Encyclicals, specifically Paragraph 9 of Pope Leo XIII's 1884 encyclical: Humanum Genus, condemn any and all Freemasonic organizations and sects and bans the laity from becoming members.

== Notable Moose members ==
=== Politicians ===
- Evan Bayh — former U.S. Senator/Governor of Indiana — Elkhart, Indiana Lodge: 599
- Robert C. Byrd — U.S. Senator — Beckley, West Virginia: Lodge 1606
- Tom Corbett — Governor of Pennsylvania — Pittsburgh, Pennsylvania: Lodge 2699
- Richard J. Daley — Mayor of Chicago 1955–1976 — Greater Chicago, Illinois: Lodge 3
- Albert Dutton MacDade — Pennsylvania State Senator 1921-1929
- Joe Manchin III — U.S. Senator, State of West Virginia — Charleston, West Virginia: Lodge 1444
- C.L. "Butch" Otter — Governor, State of Idaho 2007 — Boise, Idaho: Lodge 337
- Tommy Thompson — former U.S. Secretary of Health & Human Services — Juneau County, Wisconsin: Lodge 1913
- Earl Warren — Chief Justice U.S. Supreme Court (Holder of the Pilgrim Degree of Merit) – Oakland, California: Lodge 324

=== Entertainers ===
- Jimmie Allen — 2022 Grammy-nominated country music singer-songwriter
- Bud Abbott and Lou Costello — radio, television and movie entertainers — Atlantic City, New Jersey: Lodge 216
- Ernest Borgnine — Oscar-winning actor — Junction City, Oregon: Lodge 2238
- Charlie Chaplin — motion picture actor/director/producer — Los Angeles, California: Lodge 134
- Harry Cording — motion picture actor — Van Nuys, California: Lodge 306
- Erik Estrada — television actor; national spokesman, Safe Surfin' USA — Bedford, Virginia: Lodge 1897
- Ralph Stanley – bluegrass recording artist — Dinwiddie, Virginia: Lodge 1993
- James Stewart – Oscar-winning actor — Indiana, Pennsylvania: Lodge 174
- Danny Thomas – entertainer — Indianapolis, Indiana: Lodge 17
- Darryl Worley – country music artist — Savannah, Tennessee: Lodge 1918

=== Athletes ===
- Ed Beard – Middle Linebacker, San Francisco 49ers — South Norfolk, Virginia: Lodge 464
- Raymond Berry – NFL Hall-of-famer, Baltimore Colts / Super Bowl XX Coach, New England Patriots — Montgomery County, Virginia: Lodge 1470
- Larry Bird – NBA Hall-of-famer — Orange County, Indiana: Lodge 2530
- Walter Blum – Hall of Fame Jockey with 4,382 wins — Lauderdale Lakes, Florida: Lodge 2267
- Manute Bol – NBA's tallest-ever player — Chicopee Falls, Massachusetts: Lodge 1849
- Ross Chastain – NASCAR Driver — Alva, Florida: Lodge 1287
- Jason Couch – Hall of Fame Professional Bowler — South Lake County, Florida: Lodge 1615
- Jack Ham – NFL Hall of Fame linebacker, Pittsburgh Steelers — Indiana, Pennsylvania: Lodge 174
- Woody Hayes – Ohio State University Football Coach — Columbus, Ohio: Lodge 11
- Ted Hendricks – NFL Hall of fame Linebacker — Hialeah, Florida: Lodge 1074
- Bob Huggins – Men's Basketball Coach, West Virginia — Charleston, West Virginia: Lodge 1444
- Pete Johnson (American football) – Fullback, Ohio State & Cincinnati Bengals — Gahanna, Ohio: Lodge 2463
- Jerry Lucas – Basketball Hall of Fame; NBA Rookie of the Year 1964; Sports Illustrated "Sportsman of the Year" 1961; Only Three-Time Big Ten Conference Player of the Year — Bucyrus, Ohio: Lodge 669
- Rocky Marciano – Boxer
- Billy Martin – All-Star Infielder, Manager — Oakland, California: Lodge 324
- Zach Miller – NFL Tight End — Mooseheart, Illinois: Lodge 2655
- Arnold Palmer – Golfer — Greensburg, Pennsylvania: Lodge 1151
- Cal Ripken Sr. – Baseball Manager — Aberdeen, Maryland: Lodge 1450
- Gale Sayers – NFL Hall of Famer — Elkhart, Indiana: Lodge 599
- Billy Sims – 1978 Heisman Trophy Winner; Running back, University of Oklahoma (1975–79) and Detroit Lions (1980–84); Member, College Football Hall of fame — Grand Rapids-Sparta, Michigan: Lodge 50
- Bill "Moose" Skowron – Major League Baseball Player (1954–1967) – River Park, Illinois: Lodge 2578
- Bill Stewart – Head Football Coach of West Virginia University — New Martinsville, West Virginia: Lodge 931
- Tony Stewart – NASCAR Driver — Columbus, Indiana: Lodge 398
- Gene Tunney – Boxer — Cincinnati, Ohio: Lodge 2
- Bill Veeck – Major League Baseball Executive — Greater Chicago, Illinois: Lodge 3
- Honus Wagner – Baseball Hall-of-Famer — Pittsburgh, Pennsylvania: Lodge 46
- Donnell Woolford – Pro Bowl Cornerback, Chicago Bears — Batavia, Illinois: Lodge 682

=== Other ===
- Eugene Cernan — Astronaut; "the last man on the Moon" in December 1972 — Bellwood, Illinois: Lodge 777
- Henry Ford — Inventor of the mass-produced automobile — Detroit, Michigan: Lodge 160
- Virgil I. "Gus" Grissom — Astronaut — Newport News, Virginia: Lodge 1711
- Darell Hammond — Founder/CEO, KaBOOM! Inc.. Builder of playgrounds worldwide; Mooseheart High School Class of 1989 — Batavia, Illinois: Lodge 682
- Edward A. Silk — Mooseheart Class of 1935; Recipient of the Medal of Honor in World War II — Johnstown, Pennsylvania: Lodge 48
