= Aetna Station No. 5 =

- U.S. National Register of Historic Places
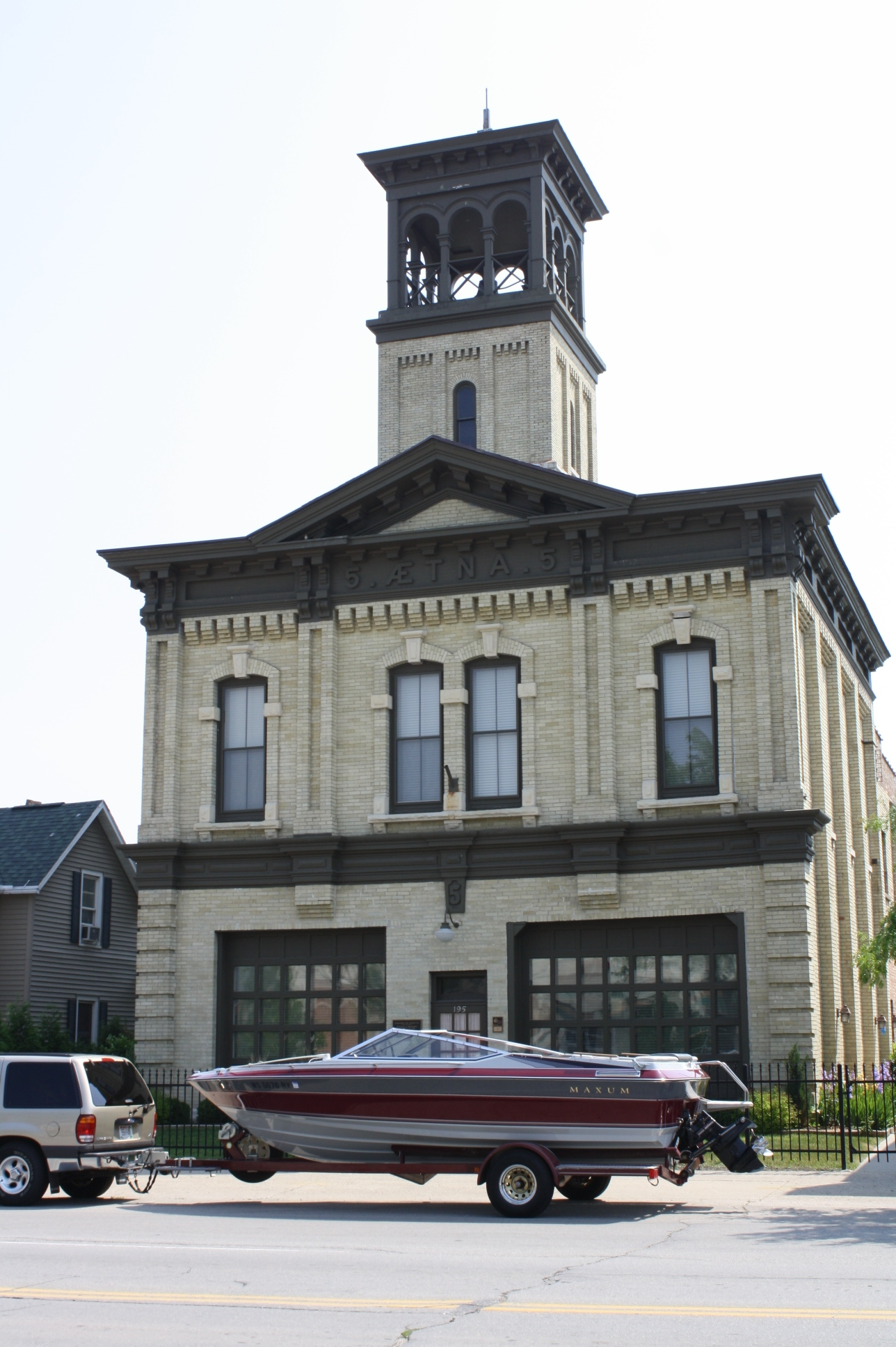
- Aetna Station No. 5

- Location within Wisconsin Location within the United States
- Location: 193 N. Main St., Fond du Lac, Wisconsin
- Coordinates: 43°47′03″N 88°26′46″W
- Area: 0.3 acres (0.12 ha)
- Built: 1875
- Architect: Thomas H. Green
- Architectural style: Italianate
- NRHP reference No.: 76000059
- Added to NRHP: December 12, 1976

Aetna Station No. 5 is located in Fond du Lac, Wisconsin.

== History ==
The building served as a fire station until 1985. Afterwards, the first floor was converted into office space and the second floor into apartments. It was listed on the National Register of Historic Places in 1976 and on the State Register of Historic Places in 1989.
