= Club Harbor =

- U.S. National Register of Historic Places
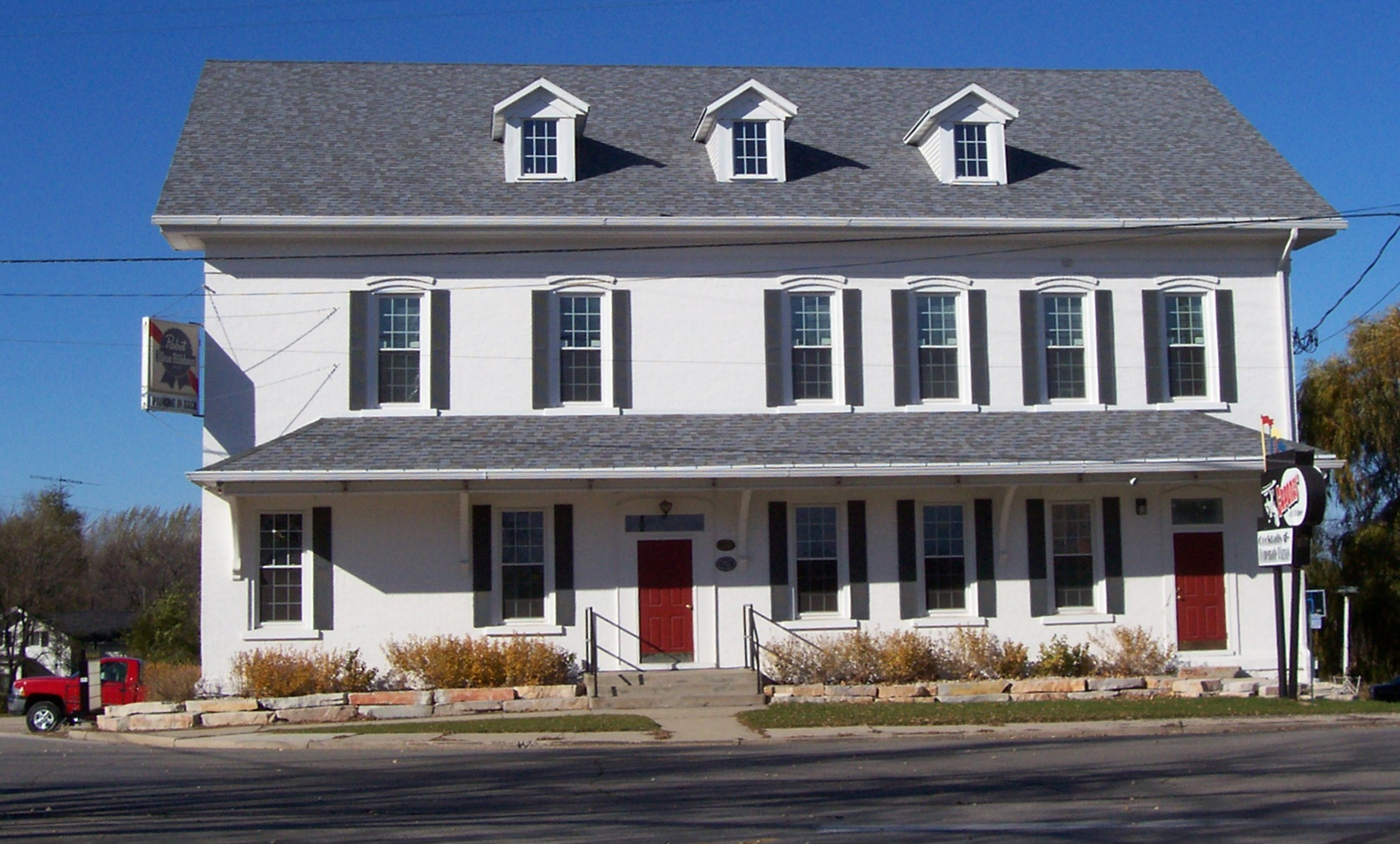
- Club Harbor
- Location: Jct. of WI 151 and WI W, Pipe, Wisconsin
- Coordinates: 43°54′51″N 88°18′50″W
- Area: 1.2 acres (0.49 ha)
- Built: 1846
- Architectural style: Greek Revival
- NRHP reference No.: 80000135
- Added to NRHP: January 22, 1980

Club Harbor is located in Pipe, Wisconsin.

== History ==
The building was opened as a stagecoach stop. In large part, it served those travelling along a military road connecting Fort Howard and Fort Winnebago. Beginning in 1856, it was operated by Jacob Fuhrman. The building was listed on the National Register of Historic Places in 1980 and on the State Register of Historic Places in 1989.
