= El Dorado Apartments (Fond du Lac, Wisconsin) =

- U.S. National Register of Historic Places
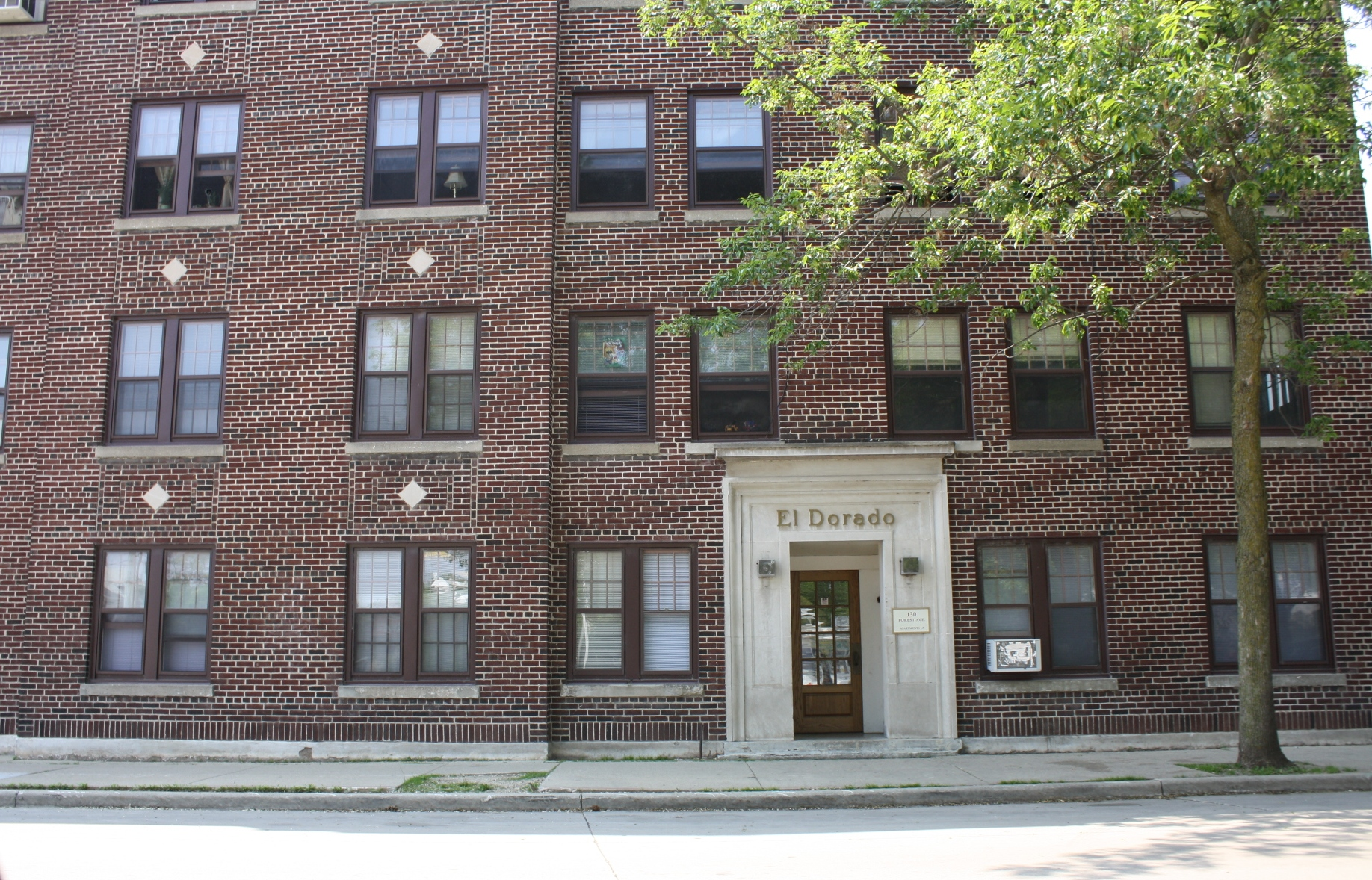
- El Dorado Apartments

- Location within Wisconsin Location within the United States
- Location: 130 Forest Ave., Fond du Lac, Wisconsin
- Coordinates: 43°46′37″N 88°27′7″W
- Built: 1921
- Architect: Immel Construction Co.
- Architectural style: Classical Revival
- NRHP reference No.: 91001979
- Added to NRHP: January 22, 1992

The El Dorado Apartments in Fond du Lac, Wisconsin were built in 1921. The building was listed on the National Register of Historic Places in 1992.
