= George and Mary Agnes Dana House =

Historic house in Wisconsin, United States

- U.S. National Register of Historic Places
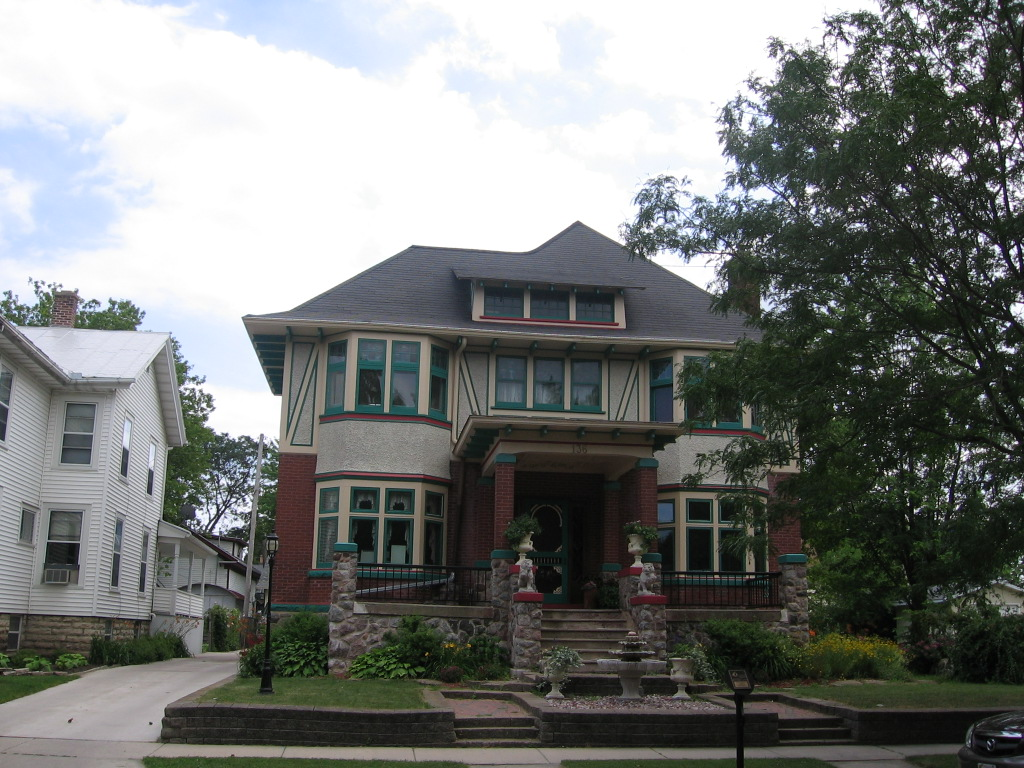
- George and Mary Agnes Dana House

- Location within Wisconsin Location within the United States
- Location: 136 Sheboygan St., Fond du Lac, Wisconsin
- Coordinates: 43°46′46″N 88°26′28″W
- Area: less than one acre
- Built: 1906
- Architectural style: Bungalow/Craftsman
- NRHP reference No.: 02000148
- Added to NRHP: March 6, 2002

The George and Mary Agnes Dana House is located in Fond du Lac, Wisconsin.

== History ==
George Dana was the owner of a furniture company. The house was added to the State Register of Historic Places in 2001 and to the National Register of Historic Places the following year.
