= National Register of Historic Places listings in Union County, Arkansas =

Location of Union County in Arkansas

This is a list of the National Register of Historic Places listings in Union County, Arkansas.

This is intended to be a complete list of the properties and districts on the National Register of Historic Places in Union County, Arkansas, United States. The locations of National Register properties and districts for which the latitude and longitude coordinates are included below, may be seen in a map.

There are 40 properties and districts listed on the National Register in the county.

Contents: Counties in Arkansas
- Arkansas
- Ashley
- Baxter
- Benton
- Boone
- Bradley
- Calhoun
- Carroll
- Chicot
- Clark
- Clay
- Cleburne
- Cleveland
- Columbia
- Conway
- Craighead
- Crawford
- Crittenden
- Cross
- Dallas
- Desha
- Drew
- Faulkner
- Franklin
- Fulton
- Garland
- Grant
- Greene
- Hempstead
- Hot Spring
- Howard
- Independence
- Izard
- Jackson
- Jefferson
- Johnson
- Lafayette
- Lawrence
- Lee
- Lincoln
- Little River
- Logan
- Lonoke
- Madison
- Marion
- Miller
- Mississippi
- Monroe
- Montgomery
- Nevada
- Newton
- Ouachita
- Perry
- Phillips
- Pike
- Poinsett
- Polk
- Pope
- Prairie
- Pulaski (Little Rock)
- Randolph
- St. Francis
- Saline
- Scott
- Searcy
- Sebastian
- Sevier
- Sharp
- Stone
- Union
- Van Buren
- Washington
- White
- Woodruff
- Yell

This National Park Service list is complete through NPS recent listings posted January 16, 2026.

== Current listings ==
	Name on the Register	Image	Date listed	Location	City or town	Description
1	Bank of Commerce	Bank of Commerce	March 25, 1982 (#82002145)	200 N. Washington St. 33°12′45″N 92°39′52″W	El Dorado	
2	Barton Library		December 10, 2024 (#100001232)	200 E. 5th St. 33°13′19″N 92°39′42″W	El Dorado	
3	Dual State Monument	Dual State Monument	September 11, 2000 (#99001354)	County Road 86; 33°00′39″N 92°22′05″W	Aurelle vicinity	Extends into Union Parish, Louisiana
4	Early View Lodge No. 181		January 6, 2022 (#100007328)	1965 Mount Zion Rd. 33°11′46″N 92°25′30″W	Urbana vicinity	
5	El Dorado Apartments	El Dorado Apartments	December 1, 1983 (#83003549)	420 Wilson Pl. 33°12′22″N 92°39′37″W	El Dorado	
6	El Dorado Commercial Historic District	El Dorado Commercial Historic District	August 21, 2003 (#03000773)	Courthouse Square, portions of Main, Jefferson, Washington, Jackson, Cedar, and Locust Sts. 33°12′40″N 92°39′45″W	El Dorado	
7	El Dorado Confederate Monument	El Dorado Confederate Monument	April 26, 1996 (#96000463)	Courthouse lawn, near the junction of N. Main St. and S. Washington; 33°12′43″N 92°39′48″W	El Dorado	
8	El Dorado Junior College Building	El Dorado Junior College Building	September 13, 1978 (#78000633)	300 S. West Ave. 33°12′34″N 92°39′58″W	El Dorado	
9	Exchange Bank	Exchange Bank	December 16, 1986 (#86003304)	Washington and Oak Sts. 33°12′47″N 92°39′49″W	El Dorado	
10	First Presbyterian Church	First Presbyterian Church	May 14, 1991 (#91000579)	300 E. Main; 33°12′44″N 92°39′41″W	El Dorado	
11	Goodwin Field Administration Building		August 2, 2018 (#100002479)	418 Airport Dr. 33°12′58″N 92°48′42″W	El Dorado	
12	Griffin Auto Company Building	Griffin Auto Company Building	May 25, 2001 (#01000525)	117 E. Locust St. 33°12′36″N 92°39′45″W	El Dorado	
13	Henley-Riley Houses		June 26, 2017 (#100001235)	2523 and 2525 Calion Rd. 33°14′14″N 92°39′25″W	El Dorado	
14	Hillsboro Street Viaduct		January 7, 2022 (#100007327)	Hillsboro St. between Washington and Madison Aves. 33°12′27″N 92°39′44″W	El Dorado	
15	James Johnson Boys Club Building		May 5, 2025 (#100011810)	1901 Detroit Avenue; 33°11′35″N 92°39′05″W	El Dorado	
16	Mahony Historic District	Mahony Historic District	December 19, 2011 (#11000899)	Roughly bounded by Champagnolle Rd., the alley between N. Madison and Euclid Aves., Lee Ave., and E. 5th St. 33°13′12″N 92°39′25″W	El Dorado	
16	Emon and Mabel Mahony House		January 16, 2026 (#100012579)	1903 North Madison Avenue; 33°13′49″N 92°39′35″W	El Dorado	
17	Masonic Temple	Masonic Temple	April 12, 2001 (#01000349)	106-108 N. Washington; 33°12′44″N 92°39′49″W	El Dorado	
18	D. McDonald House	D. McDonald House	December 27, 1990 (#90001949)	800 S. Broadway; 33°21′49″N 92°43′33″W	Smackover	
19	Henry Crawford McKinney House	Henry Crawford McKinney House	September 1, 1983 (#83001157)	510 E. Faulkner; 33°13′00″N 92°39′39″W	El Dorado	
20	J.H. McWilliams House	J.H. McWilliams House	September 12, 2002 (#02001044)	323 W. Oak St. 33°12′38″N 92°39′47″W	El Dorado	
21	W. F. & Estelle McWilliams House	W. F. & Estelle McWilliams House	September 30, 2013 (#13000791)	314 Summit Ave. 33°12′33″N 92°40′03″W	El Dorado	
22	Mount Moriah Masonic Lodge No. 18	Mount Moriah Masonic Lodge No. 18	March 13, 1987 (#87000442)	Off Highway 172; 33°16′18″N 92°49′36″W	Lisbon	
23	Municipal Building	Municipal Building	June 30, 1983 (#83001167)	204 N. West Ave. 33°12′43″N 92°39′50″W	El Dorado	
24	Charles H. Murphy Sr. House	Charles H. Murphy Sr. House	September 8, 1983 (#83001168)	900 N. Madison Ave. 33°13′14″N 92°39′37″W	El Dorado	
25	J.T. Murphy No 1 Crater	J.T. Murphy No 1 Crater	January 24, 2008 (#07001435)	Firetower Rd., 0.75 miles (1.21 km) north of its junction with Baugh St. 33°20′38″N 92°40′06″W	Norphlet	
26	Murphy-Hill Historic District	Murphy-Hill Historic District	September 20, 2007 (#07000974)	Roughly bounded by E. 5th St., N. Jefferson St., E. Peach St., N. Madison St., and E. Faulkner St. 33°13′04″N 92°39′39″W	El Dorado	
27	Oakland		January 28, 2019 (#100003358)	3800 Calion Rd. 33°15′00″N 92°39′24″W	El Dorado	
28	Matthew Rainey House	Matthew Rainey House	November 6, 1974 (#74000501)	510 N. Jackson St. 33°12′53″N 92°39′44″W	El Dorado	Now the Newton House Museum
29	Randolph James House	Randolph James House	May 14, 2012 (#12000277)	1212 N. Madison Ave. 33°13′23″N 92°39′35″W	El Dorado	
30	Rialto Theatre	Rialto Theatre	August 21, 1986 (#86001888)	117 E. Cedar St. 33°12′38″N 92°39′47″W	El Dorado	
31	Rock Island Railroad Overpass		September 17, 2021 (#100006932)	East Hillsboro St. over Union Pacific RR Line; 33°12′26″N 92°39′20″W	El Dorado	
32	Rumph Mortuary		June 26, 2017 (#100001237)	312 W. Oak; 33°12′49″N 92°39′58″W	El Dorado	
33	Scotland Cemetery	Scotland Cemetery	September 28, 2005 (#05001081)	U.S. Route 167, 3 miles (4.8 km) west of Junction City; 33°02′59″N 92°45′03″W	Junction City	
34	Smackover Historic Commercial District	Smackover Historic Commercial District	June 14, 1990 (#90000884)	601-628 Broadway; 33°21′55″N 92°43′29″W	Smackover	
35	Joel Smith House	Joel Smith House	August 31, 1990 (#90001220)	Junction of U.S. Route 167 and County Road 5; 33°07′38″N 92°38′19″W	El Dorado	
36	Smith-McCurry House	Smith-McCurry House	October 15, 1992 (#92001394)	Northern side of Highway 15, 3.5 miles (5.6 km) east of El Dorado; 33°13′16″N 92°35′26″W	El Dorado	
37	Union County Courthouse	Union County Courthouse	June 30, 1983 (#83001169)	Union Sq. 33°12′43″N 92°39′50″W	El Dorado	
38	Willett House	Willett House	September 14, 1995 (#95001103)	6563 Mount Holly Rd. 33°16′09″N 92°47′34″W	Lisbon	
38	YWCA Building		January 16, 2026 (#100012580)	118 West Peach Street; 33°12′51″N 92°39′53″W	El Dorado	

== Former listings ==
	Name on the Register	Image	Date listed	Date removed	Location	City or town	Description
1	Garrett House		November 21, 1974 (#74000500)	June 3, 1986	210 Peach St.	El Dorado	
2	Ouachita River Bridge	Ouachita River Bridge	April 9, 1990 (#90000507)	August 11, 1999	US 167, over the Ouachita River	Calion	Replaced in 1993.
3	SAU at El Dorado		December 22, 1982 (#82000939)	September 24, 2004	Summit at Block Streets	El Dorado	

== See also ==
- List of National Historic Landmarks in Arkansas
- National Register of Historic Places listings in Arkansas
