= McCurry =

McCurry is a surname. Notable people with the surname include:

== People ==
- Darren McCurry, Irish Gaelic Footballer and plays for Edendork and Tyrone
- Dave McCurry (1951–2020), American football player
- Duke McCurry (1900–1965), professional ice hockey left winger
- H.O. McCurry (1889–1964), Canadian civil servant, director of the National Gallery of Canada
- Jeff McCurry (born 1970), retired Major League Baseball pitcher
- Jimmy McCurry (1830–1910), Irish folk musician
- John McCurry (born 1957), American musician and composer
- Kathryn McCurry (1908–2002), the wife of the founder of the Albertsons chain of grocery stores
- Margaret McCurry (born 1942), American architect and a Fellow of the American Institute of Architects
- Mike McCurry (press secretary) (born 1954), former press secretary for Bill Clinton's administration
- Mike McCurry (referee) (born 1964), football referee from Scotland
- Stephanie McCurry, American historian and a professor of history at Columbia University
- Steve McCurry (born 1950), American photojournalist

== Other uses ==
- McCurry, Missouri, a community in the United States
- McCurry Pan, brand of McDonald's in India
- McCurry-Kidd House, a house listed on the National Register of Historic Places
- Smith-McCurry House, historic house on Arkansas Highway 15

== See also ==
- McCarry, a surname
