= W. F. & Estelle McWilliams House =

Historic house in Arkansas, United States

- U.S. National Register of Historic Places
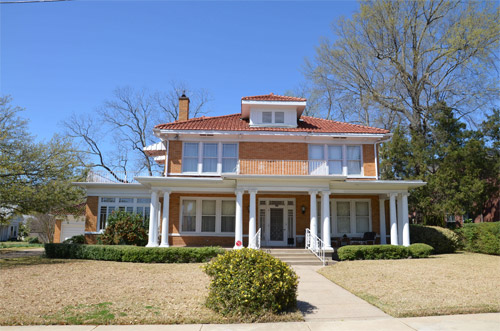

- Location within Arkansas Location within the United States
- Location: 314 Summit Avenue, El Dorado, Arkansas
- Coordinates: 33°12′33″N 92°40′3″W
- Built: 1922
- Architect: Kolben, Hunter and Boyd
- Architectural style: Craftsman/Classical Revival/Mediterranean Revival
- NRHP reference No.: 13000791
- Added to NRHP: September 30, 2013

The W. F. & Estelle McWilliams House is a historic house at 314 Summit Avenue in El Dorado, Arkansas. The two story brick house was built in 1922 for William and Estelle McWilliams, early in El Dorado's oil boom, which was prompted by the discovery of oil in 1921. McWilliams was a prominent local businessman who operated a number of retail businesses, was a local bank director, and built the Rialto Theatre. The McWilliams house is a stylistically eclectic combination of Craftsman, Classical Revival, and Mission/Mediterranean styling. Based on stylistic evidence, it may have been designed by the Little Rock firm of Kolben, Hunter and Boyd.

In 1967, Claude and Glynn Calahan purchased the home and raised their children, Gordon Calahan and Melanie Calahan Walz, in it. The Calahan's purchased the home from The First Methodist Church of El Dorado in 1967. It was the church parsonage and many weddings were held in the large living room of the home.

The Calahan's lived in the home until 2018. Glynn Calahan, who owned an antique business, filled the home with antiques suitable for the style of the home.

The home and property are now owned by South Arkansas Community College and have been incorporated into the college campus which now surrounds the home.

The house was listed on the National Register of Historic Places in 2013.

== See also ==
- J.H. McWilliams House, built by McWilliams' brother
- El Dorado Junior College Building: Also on the SouthArk campus
- South Arkansas Arboretum: operated by SouthArk
- National Register of Historic Places listings in Union County, Arkansas
