= Bank of Commerce (El Dorado, Arkansas) =

- U.S. National Register of Historic Places
- U.S. Historic district – Contributing property
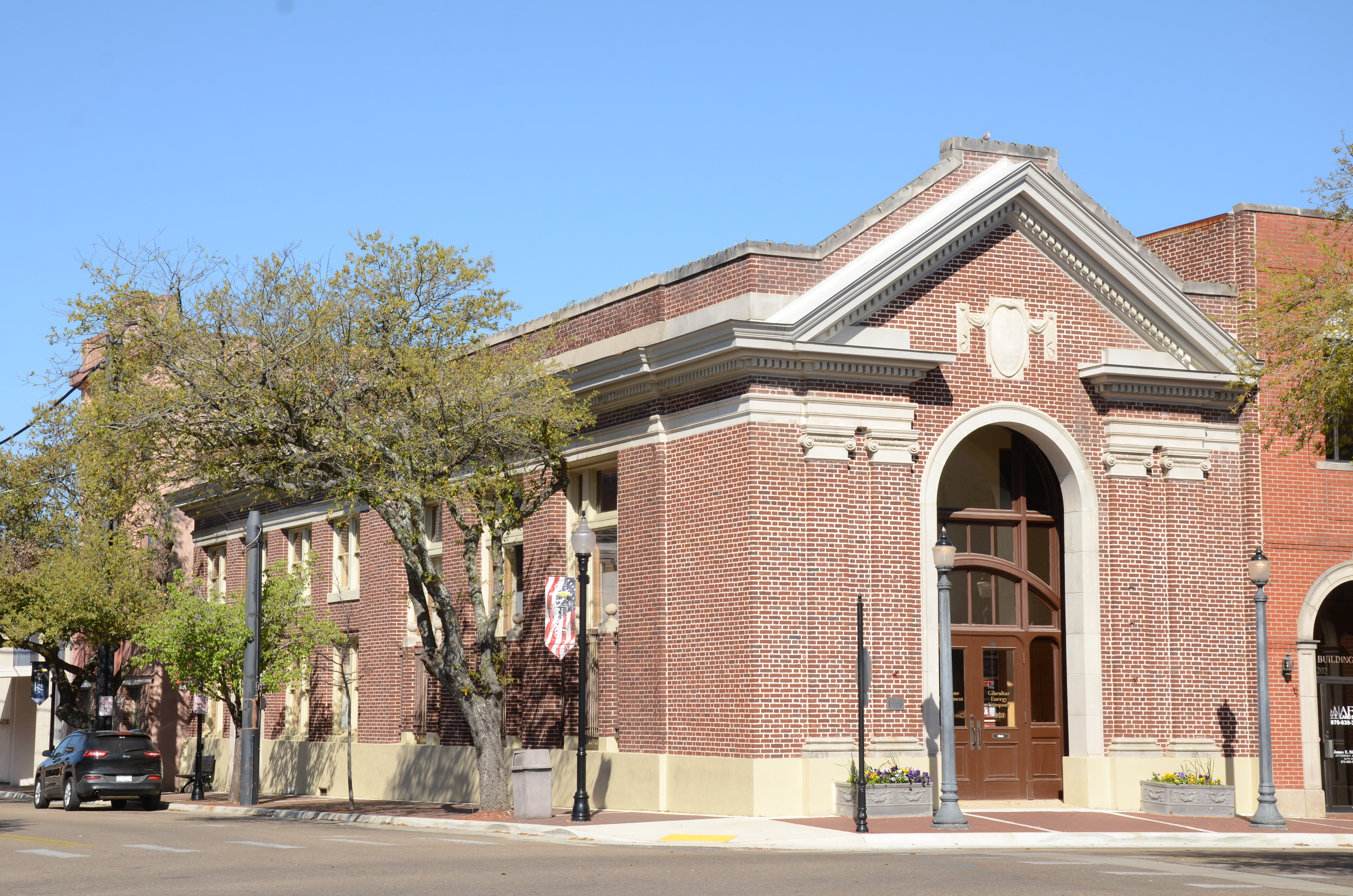

- Location within Arkansas Location within the United States
- Location: 200 N. Washington St., El Dorado, Arkansas
- Coordinates: 33°12′45″N 92°39′52″W
- Area: less than one acre
- Built: 1920
- Architectural style: Classical Revival
- Part of: El Dorado Commercial Historic District (ID03000773)
- NRHP reference No.: 82002145

Significant dates
- Added to NRHP: March 25, 1982
- Designated CP: August 21, 2003

The Bank of Commerce building is a historic commercial building at 200 North Washington Street in El Dorado, Arkansas. The Classical Revival two story brick building was constructed in 1919–20, and is one of the few buildings in El Dorado's downtown that retains its historical facade from that period. The building was renovated in the 1940s and 1950s, actions that gutted its interior, but only covered over the main facade with a new layer of brick, and left the secondary southern facade intact. In the early 1980s the building's exterior was restored to its 1920s appearance.

The building was listed on the National Register of Historic Places in 1982. It was included in the El Dorado Commercial Historic District in 2003.

== See also ==
- National Register of Historic Places listings in Union County, Arkansas
