= Randolph James House =

Historic house in Arkansas, United States

- U.S. National Register of Historic Places
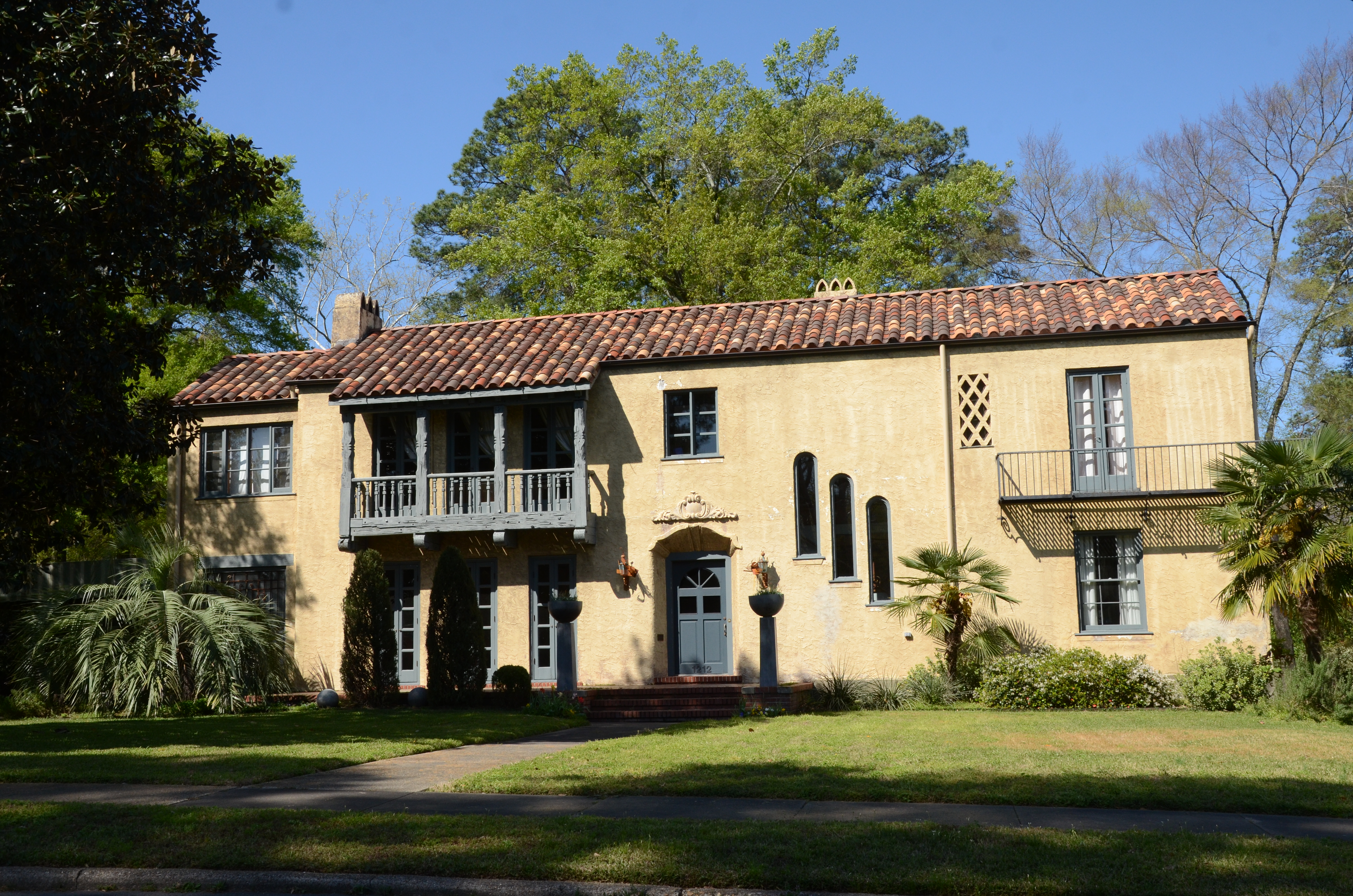

- Location within Arkansas Location within the United States
- Location: 1212 North Madison Ave., El Dorado, Arkansas
- Coordinates: 33°13′23″N 92°39′35″W
- Area: less than one acre
- Built: 1927
- NRHP reference No.: 12000277
- Added to NRHP: May 14, 2012

The Randolph James House is a historic house at 1212 North Madison Avenue in El Dorado, Arkansas. The two-story stuccoed house was designed by Mann & Stern, and was built in 1927 for Randolph James by his father George, a principal in the local Exchange Bank who benefited from the city's oil boom in the 1920s. The house is a fine local example of Spanish Mission Revival styling, with wrought iron balconies, tile roof, stucco walls, and varied windows.

The house was listed on the National Register of Historic Places in 2012.

== See also ==
- National Register of Historic Places listings in Union County, Arkansas
