= Willett House =

Historic house in Arkansas, United States

- U.S. National Register of Historic Places
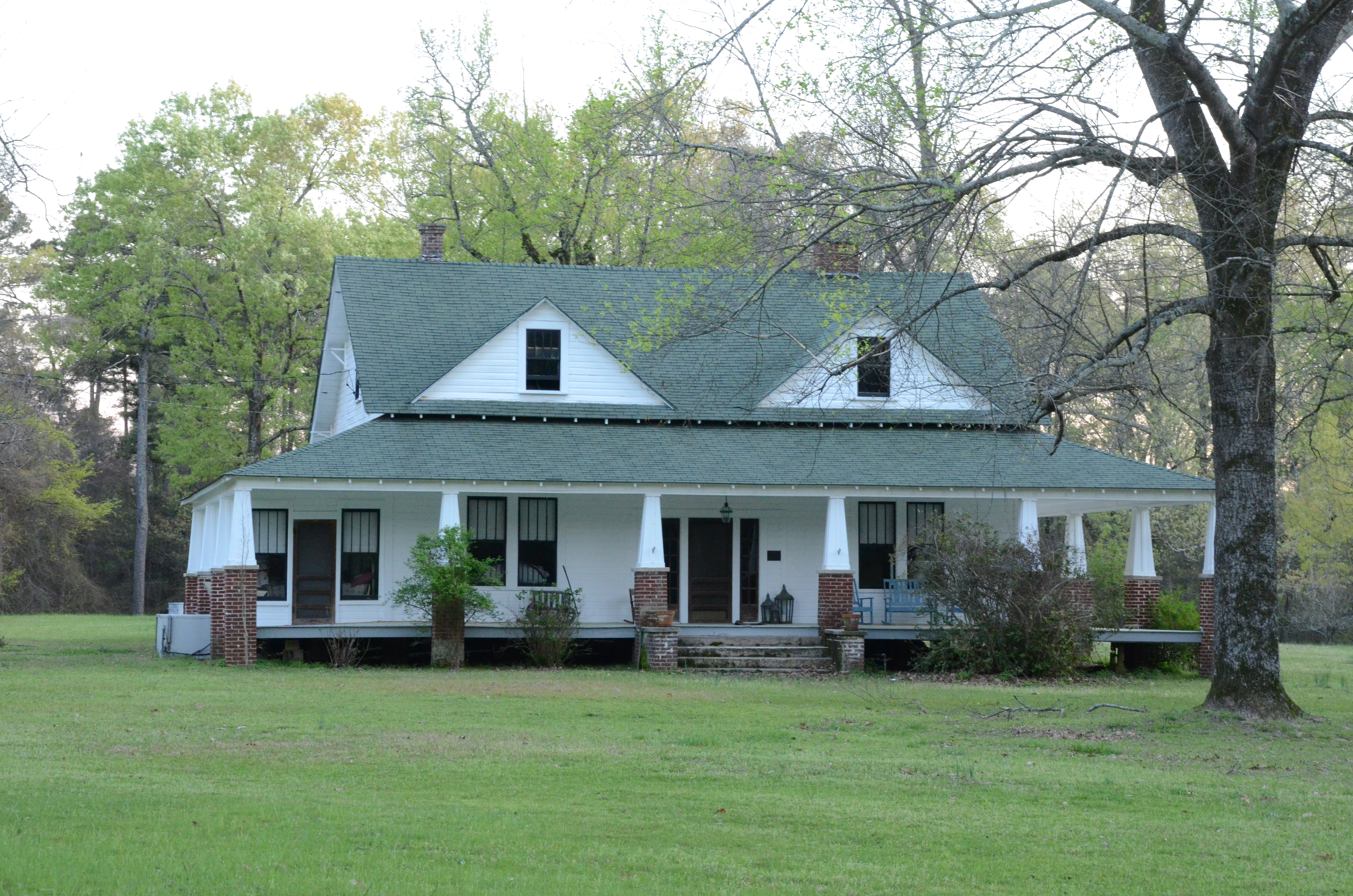

- Location within Arkansas Location within the United States
- Location: 6563 Mount Holly Rd., Lisbon, Arkansas
- Coordinates: 33°16′9″N 92°47′34″W
- Area: 5 acres (2.0 ha)
- Built: 1926
- Architectural style: Bungalow/craftsman
- NRHP reference No.: 95001103
- Added to NRHP: September 14, 1995

The Willett House is a historic house at 6563 Mount Holly Road, about 1.5 miles (2.4 km) east of Lisbon, Arkansas. The single story wood-frame house was built in 1926 by Scott and Mary Willett, and represents a well-preserved local example of Craftsman styling. The house is L-shaped, with two intersecting gable roof sections. It is sheathed in novelty siding, and has two interior chimneys. The northern facade features a wide hip roof extending over a porch supported by six battered wooden columns decorated with false battens. This porch wraps around the side elevations. The rest of the roof line has exposed rafter ends, and is further decorated with triangular knee brackets at the corners. The property also includes four outbuildings, including a c. 1900s barn.

The house was listed on the National Register of Historic Places in 1995.

== See also ==
- National Register of Historic Places listings in Union County, Arkansas
