= Masonic Temple (El Dorado, Arkansas) =

Historic place in Arkansas, United States

- U.S. National Register of Historic Places
- U.S. Historic district – Contributing property
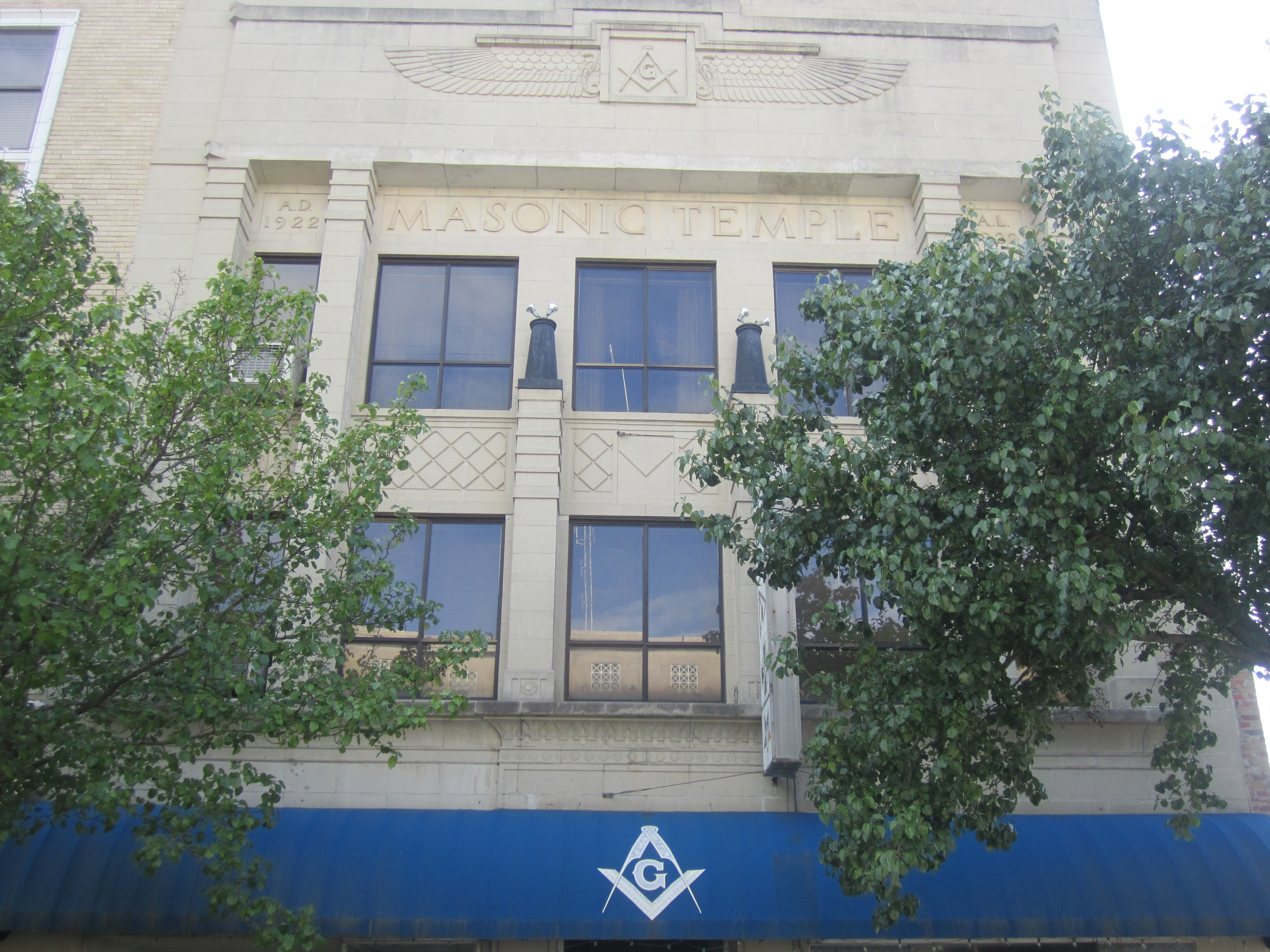

- Location within Arkansas Location within the United States
- Location: 106-108 N. Washington, El Dorado, Arkansas
- Coordinates: 33°12′44″N 92°39′49″W
- Area: 0.9 acres (0.36 ha)
- Built: 1924
- Architect: Watts, Charles; Blythe and Duerson
- Architectural style: Art Deco, Late 19th And 20th Century Revivals
- Part of: El Dorado Commercial Historic District (ID03000773)
- NRHP reference No.: 01000349

Significant dates
- Added to NRHP: April 12, 2001
- Designated CP: August 21, 2003

The Masonic Temple of El Dorado, Arkansas is located at 106-108 North Washington Street, on the west side of the courthouse square. The four-story masonry building was built in 1923–24 to a design by Little Rock architect Charles S. Watts. It is one of a small number of buildings in Arkansas with Art Deco styling influenced by the Egyptian Revival. This particular styling was likely influence by the 1922 discovery of the Tomb of Tutankhamun.

The building was listed on the National Register of Historic Places in 2001, and included in the El Dorado Commercial Historic District in 2003.

== See also ==
- National Register of Historic Places listings in Union County, Arkansas
