= Griffin Auto Company Building =

- U.S. National Register of Historic Places
- U.S. Historic district – Contributing property
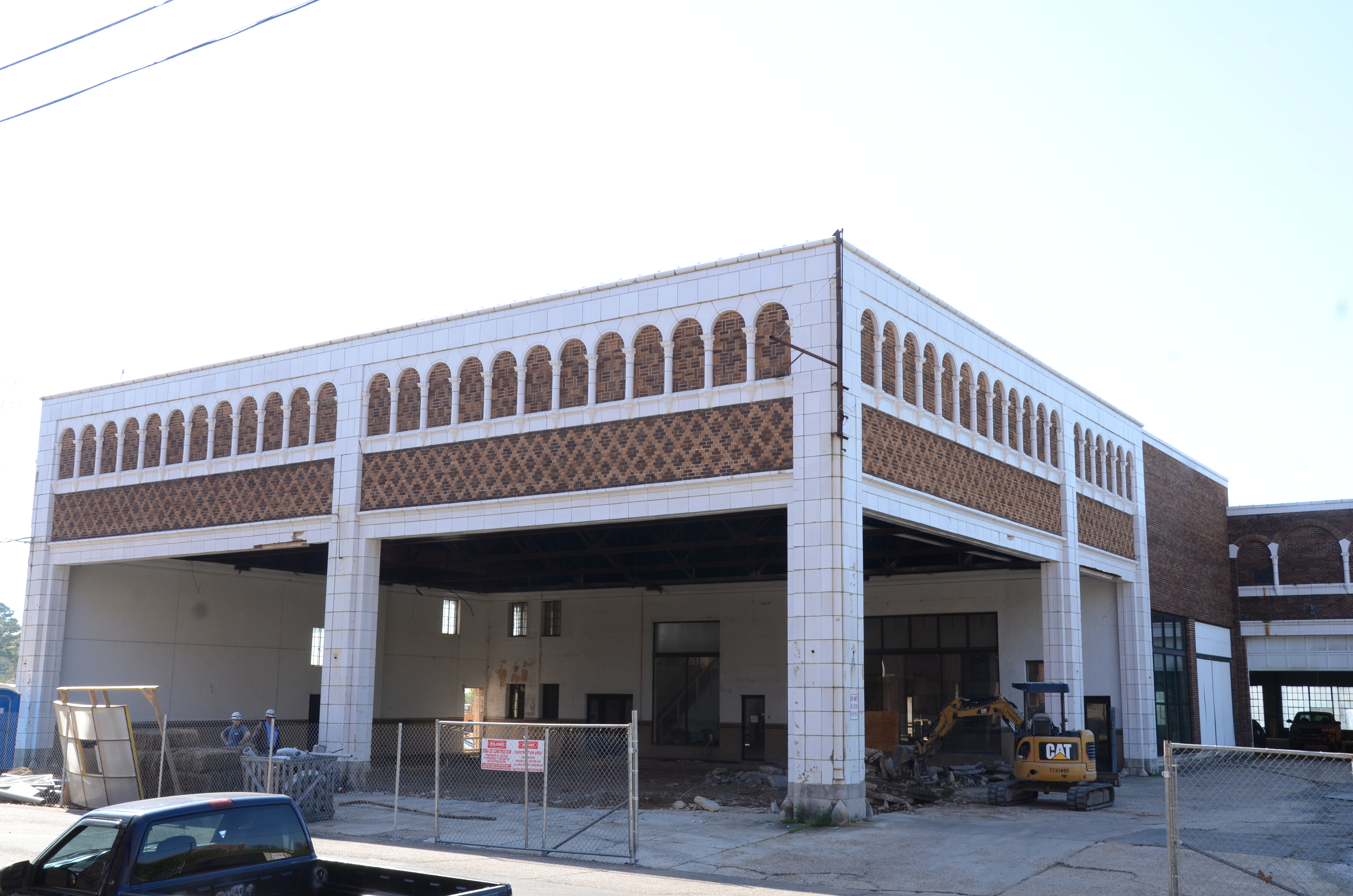

- Location within Arkansas Location within the United States
- Location: 117 E. Locust St., El Dorado, Arkansas
- Coordinates: 33°12′36″N 92°39′45″W
- Area: 3.8 acres (1.5 ha)
- Built: 1928; 98 years ago
- Architectural style: Early Commercial
- Part of: El Dorado Commercial Historic District (ID03000773)
- MPS: Arkansas Highway History and Architecture MPS
- NRHP reference No.: 01000525

Significant dates
- Added to NRHP: May 25, 2001
- Designated CP: August 21, 2003

The Griffin Auto Company Building is a historic automobile sales and service facility at 117 East Locust Street in El Dorado, Arkansas. It is a single story structure built out of reinforced concrete, with a full basement. The main floor housed the sales and showroom area, and the service area was in the basement. The building also includes a filling station area, which is the most decorative portion of the otherwise utilitarian structure. This area has pilastered columns that frame the automobile entry area, and the walls above the shelter entrance is decorated with bands of terra cotta and brick ornamentation. The Griffin Auto Company was established by three brothers from North Carolina, beginning as a livery stable business in 1899 before branching out into the new world of the automobile in 1915. They moved out of the building in 1960, since when it has been used by a variety of other sales-oriented businesses. In 2017, the Griffin Restaurant opened as part of the Murphy Arts District. Four years later, it became the MuleKick.

The building was listed on the National Register of Historic Places in 2001, and was included in the El Dorado Commercial Historic District in 2003.

== See also ==
- National Register of Historic Places listings in Union County, Arkansas
