= J.T. Murphy No 1 Crater =

- J. T. Murphy No 1 Crater
- U.S. National Register of Historic Places
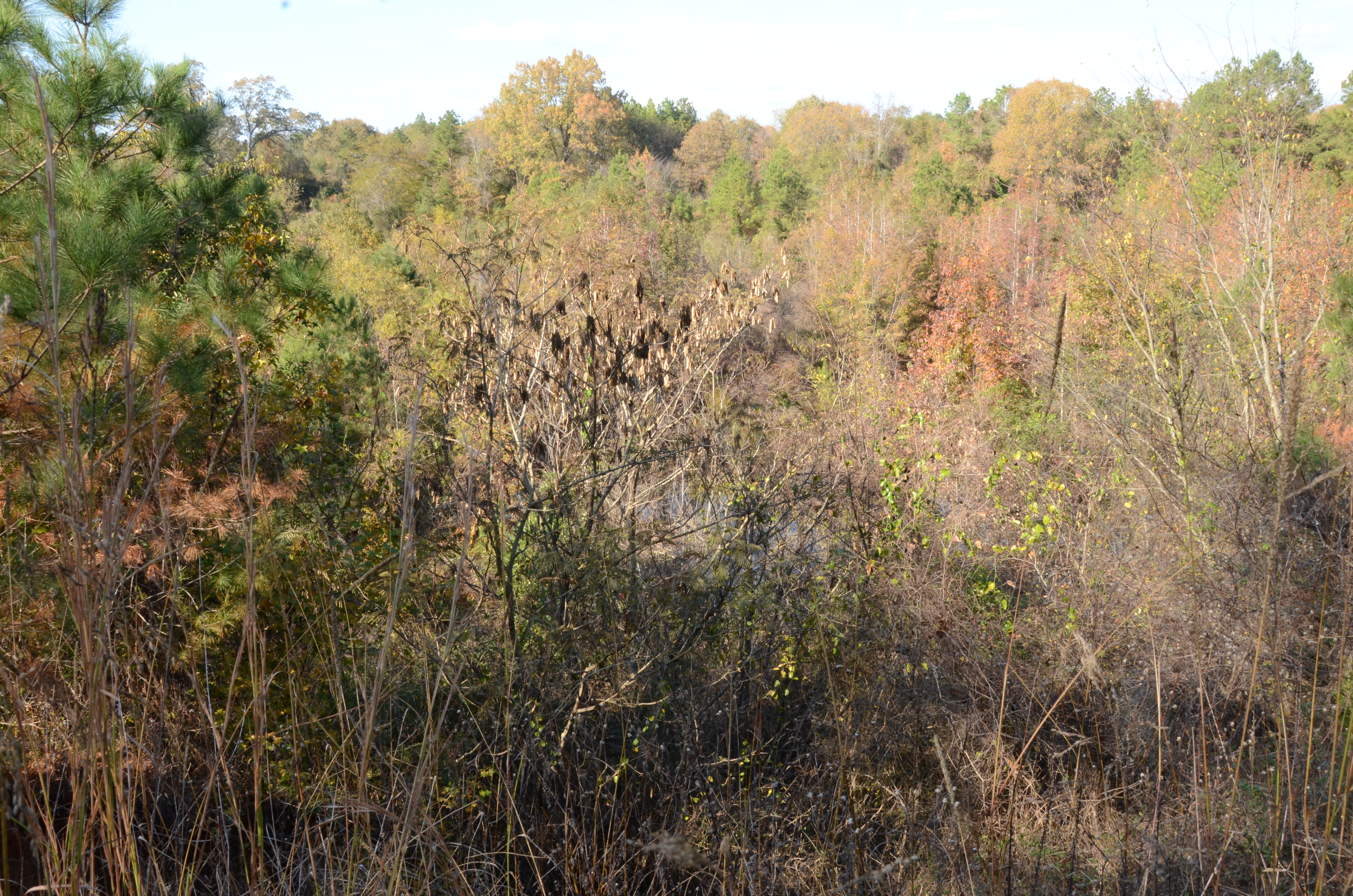

- Location within Arkansas Location within the United States
- Nearest city: Norphlet, Arkansas
- Coordinates: 33°20′38″N 92°40′6″W
- Area: 6.5 acres (2.6 ha)
- Built: 1922
- NRHP reference No.: 07001435
- Added to NRHP: January 24, 2008

The J.T. Murphy No. 1 Crater is the site of a historic oil-drilling accident near Norphlet, Arkansas, United States. The site is located about 3 miles (4.8 km) north and west of Norphlet, off Firetower Road about 3/4 mile (1.21 km) north of its junction with Baugh Street. On May 14, 1922, an oil drilling crew completed a 2,000 feet (610 m) well, dubbed J.T. Murphy No. 1, and began pumping. The early production was entirely natural gas, which began escaping from the drill collar. Eventually it caught fire, burning for several hours, and destroying the derrick. It also caused a series of violent underground explosions. This resulted in the creation of a crater 450 feet (140 m) in diameter and 50 feet (15 m) deep, along with a number of other, shallower, craters. The land, which had previously been in cotton production, was abandoned, and has gradually returned to forest.

The site was listed on the National Register of Historic Places in 2008.

== See also ==
- National Register of Historic Places listings in Union County, Arkansas
