= Mahony Historic District =

Residential area within Arkansas, United States

- U.S. National Register of Historic Places
- U.S. Historic district
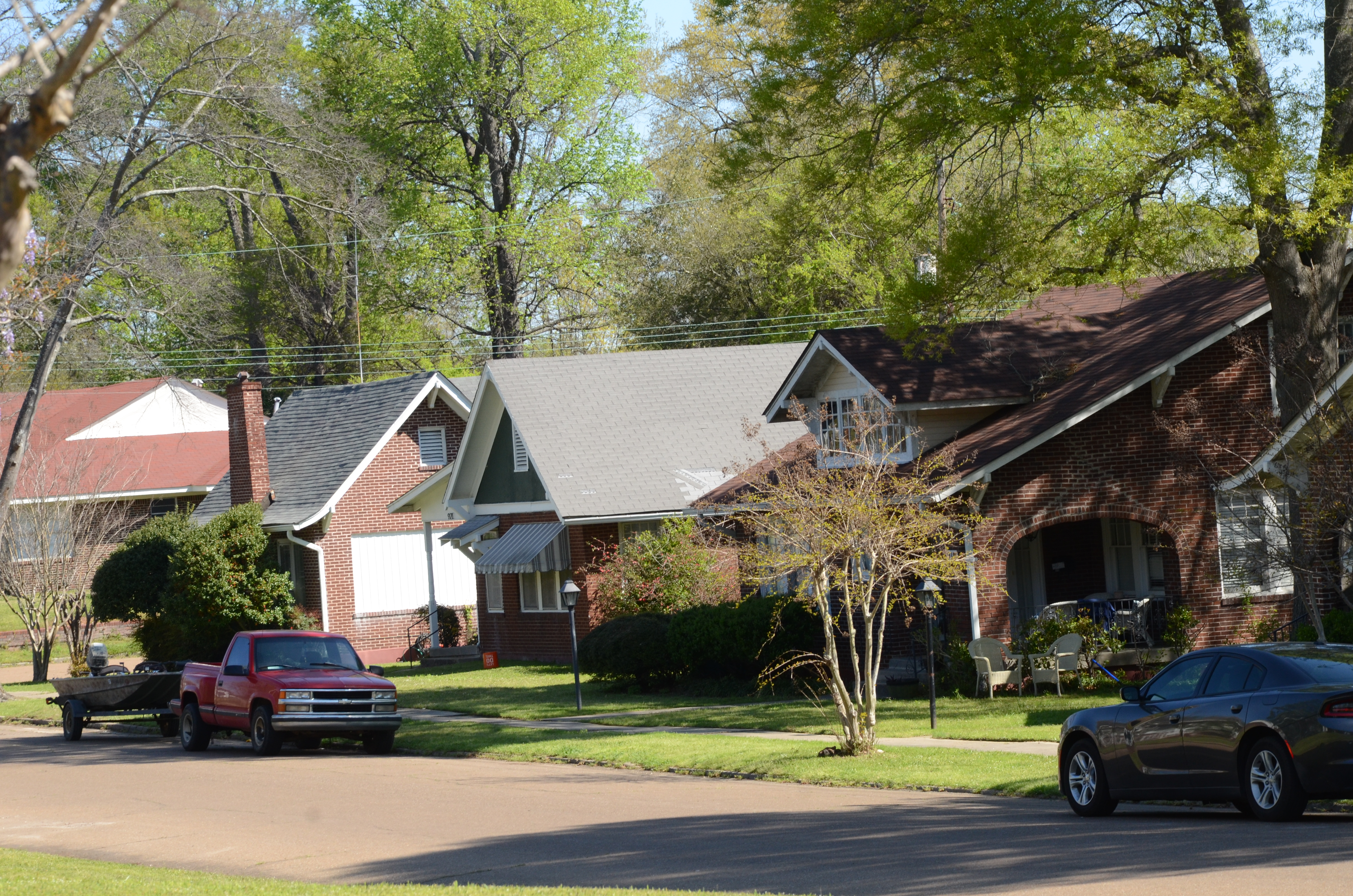

- Location within Arkansas Location within the United States
- Location: Roughly bounded by Champagnolle Rd., alley between N. Madison & Euclid Aves., Lee Ave. & E. 5th St., El Dorado, Arkansas
- Coordinates: 33.21987°N 92.65697°W
- Area: 14.25 acres (5.77 ha)
- NRHP reference No.: 11000899
- Added to NRHP: December 19, 2011

The Mahony Historic District encompasses a residential part of El Dorado, Arkansas north of its downtown area. It was an area of significant development in the years after the 1921 discovery of oil and the ensuing economic boom. The area is bounded on the south by Champagnolle Road, on the west by a line just east of North Madison Avenue, on the north by East 5th Street, and on the east by North Lee Avenue and railroad tracks. It is just over 14 acres (5.7 ha) in size, and includes 94 buildings that contribute to its significance. The streets in the district are laid out in grid form, accounting for the fact that Champagnolle Road runs diagonally from southwest to northeast. Most of the housing in the district consists of modest single-story houses, with simple styling. This is a contrast to the adjacent Murphy-Hill Historic District, a more affluent area with a longer history of development. Only five houses in the district were built before 1920, and all lie on Champagnolle Road; most of the rest were built in the decade after the oil discovery. There is one church in the district, St. Mary's Episcopal Church, completed in 1950. The district was listed on the National Register of Historic Places in 2011.

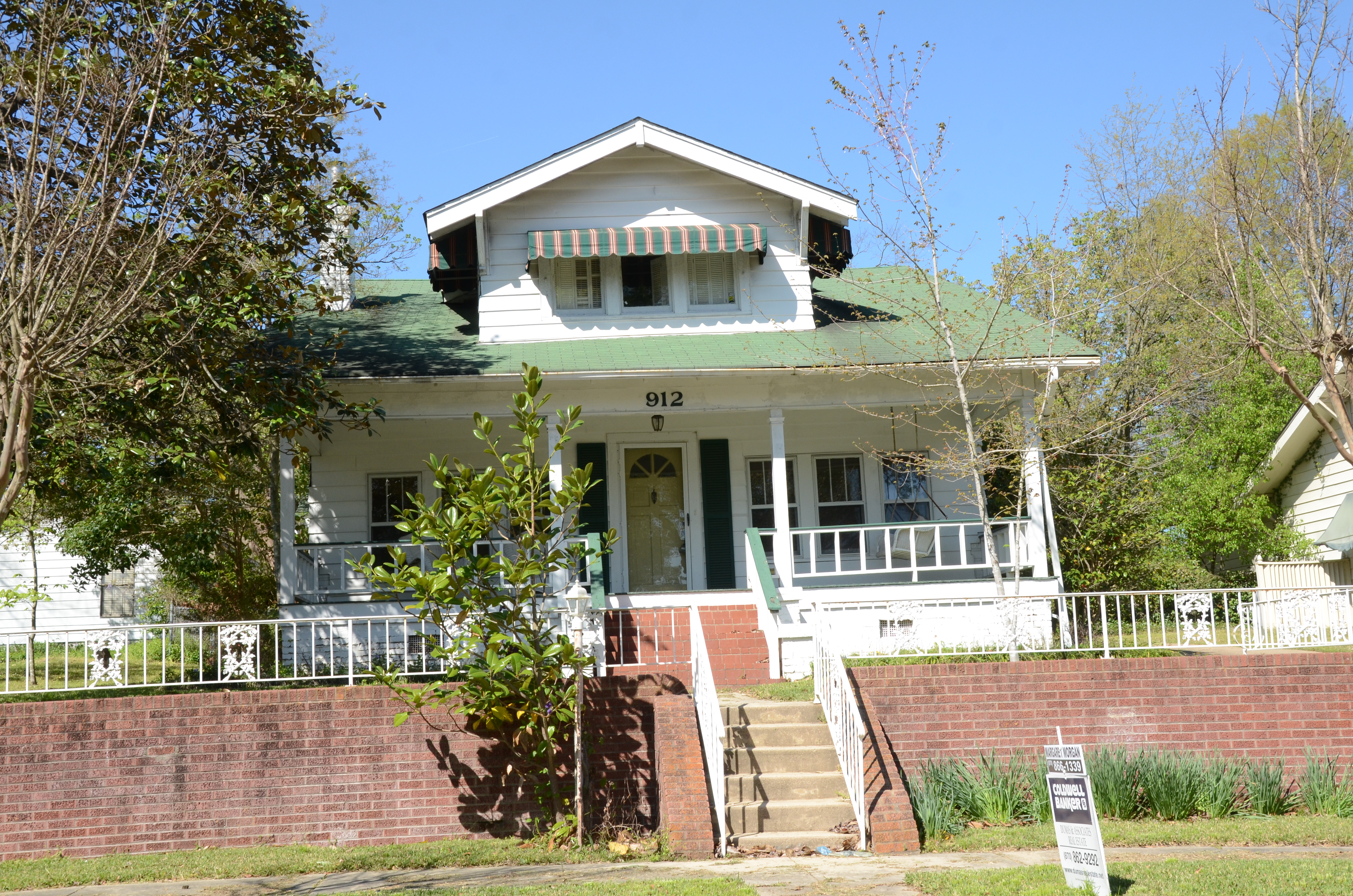
White two-story, green roof

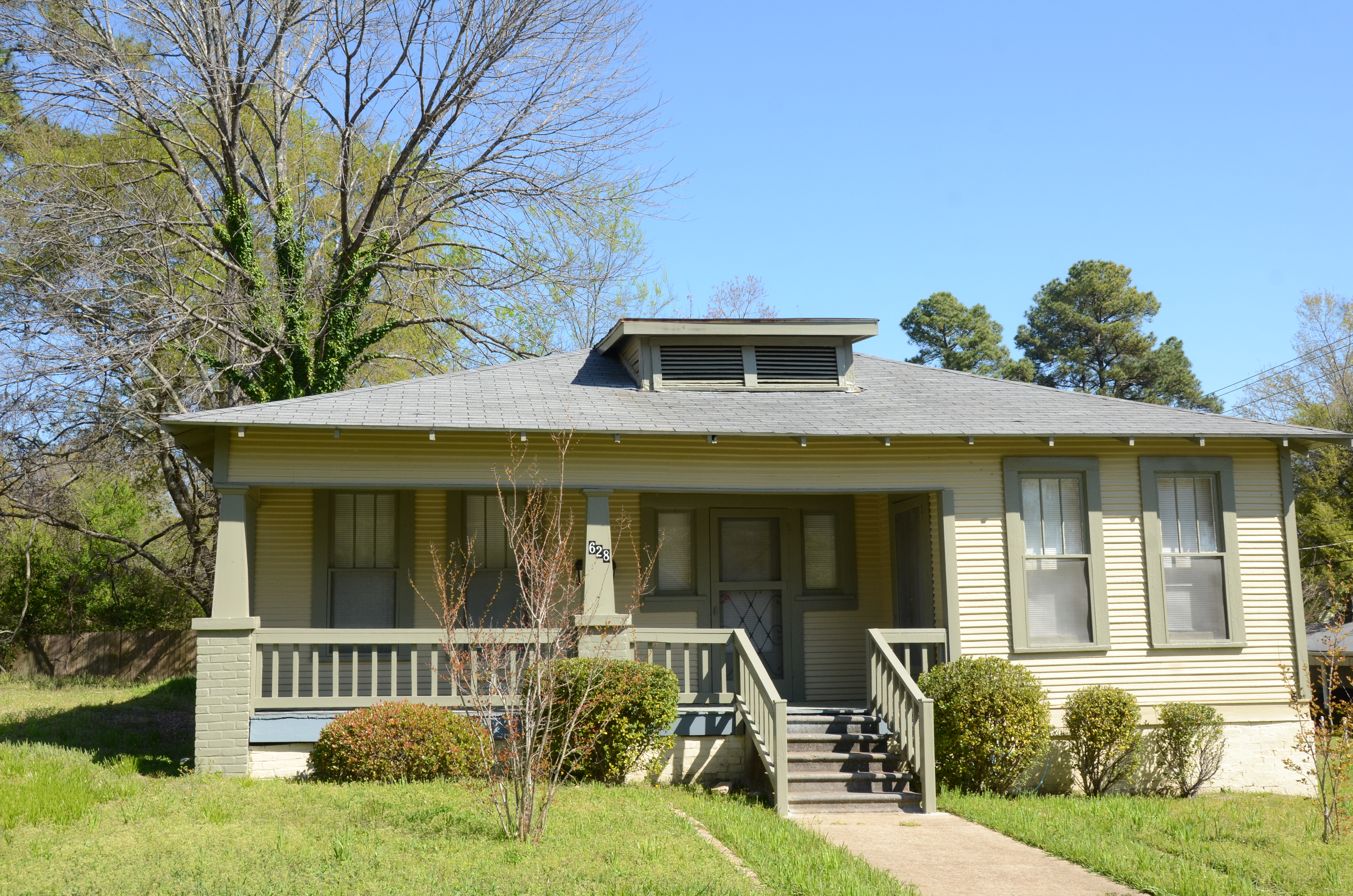
Olive bungalow

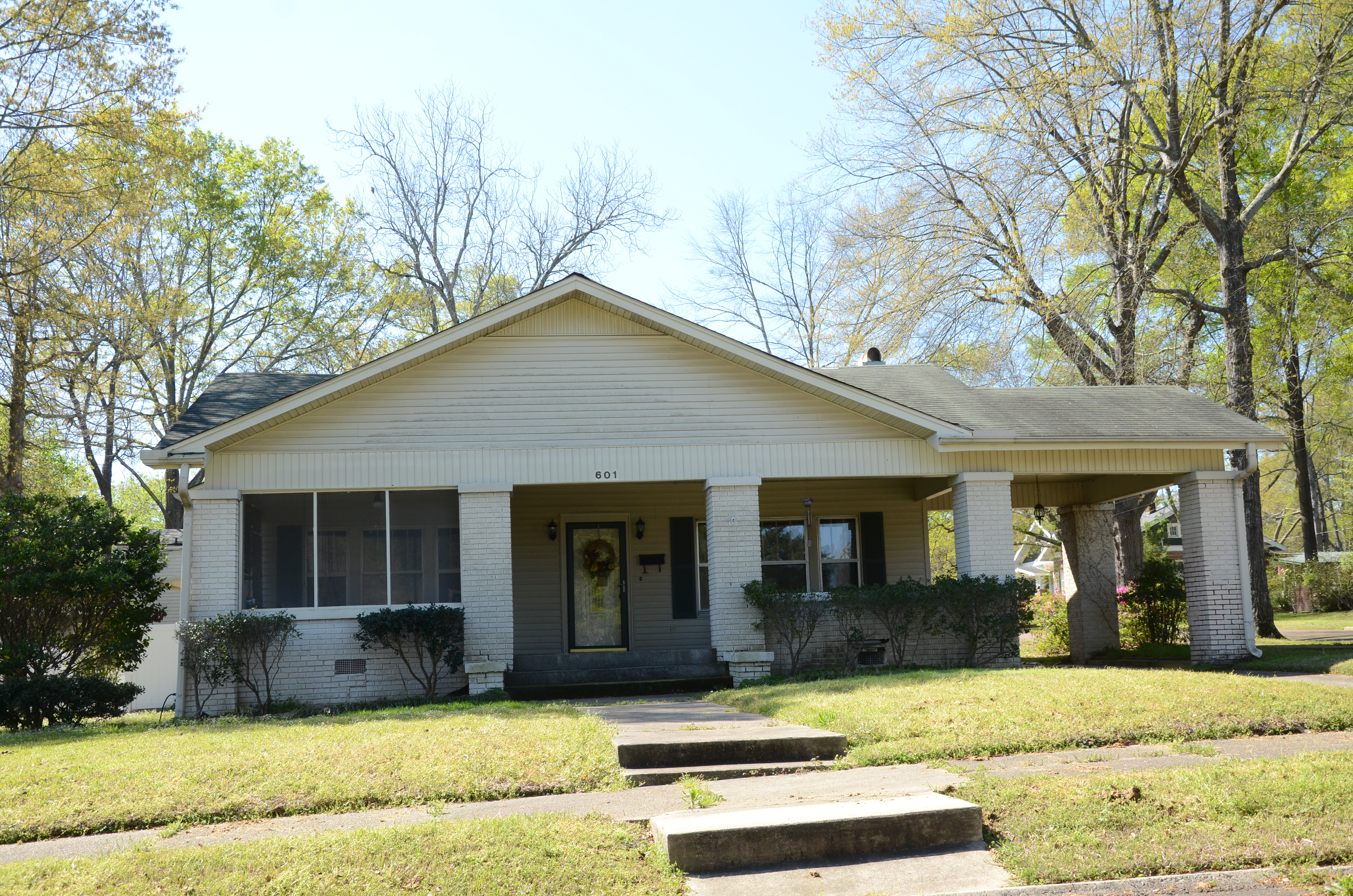
Tan bungalow

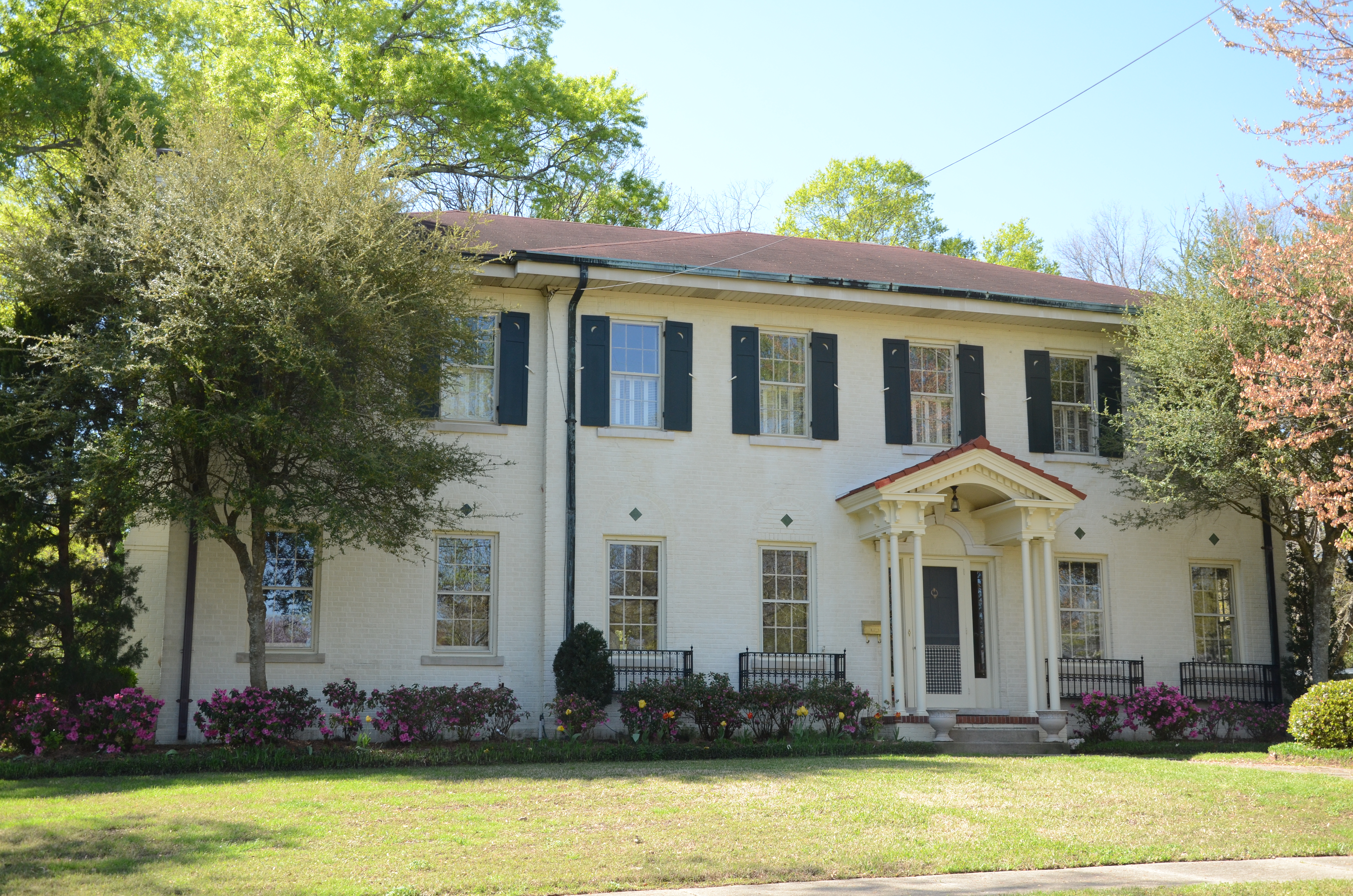
White two-story, red-brown roof

== See also ==
- National Register of Historic Places listings in Union County, Arkansas
