= Oakland (El Dorado, Arkansas) =

Historic house in Arkansas, United States

- U.S. National Register of Historic Places
- Location within Arkansas Location within the United States
- Location: 3800 Calion Rd., El Dorado, Arkansas
- Coordinates: 33°15′0″N 92°39′24″W
- Area: 4.5 acres (1.8 ha)
- Built: 1939
- Architect: Weaver, David
- NRHP reference No.: 100003358
- Added to NRHP: January 28, 2019

Oakland, also known as the Dr. Garland Doty Murphy House, is a historic house at 3800 Calion Road in El Dorado, Arkansas. It is a 2 1/2-story wood-frame structure resting on a brick foundation, with a gabled roof and clapboarded exterior. A flat-roofed porch, two stories in height, extends across the front facade, supported by square box columns. It has a symmetrical five-bay facade, with a center entrance surmounted by a semicircular pediment. The house was built in 1939 to a design by David Weaver, and is a prominent local example of Colonial Revival architecture.

The house was listed on the National Register of Historic Places in 2019.

== See also ==
- National Register of Historic Places listings in Union County, Arkansas
