= Mount Moriah Masonic Lodge No. 18 =

- U.S. National Register of Historic Places
- Location within Arkansas Location within the United States
- Location: Off AR 172, Lisbon, Arkansas
- Coordinates: 33°16′18″N 92°49′36″W
- Area: 1 acre (0.40 ha)
- Built: 1858
- Architect: McKinzie, L.O.
- NRHP reference No.: 87000442
- Added to NRHP: March 13, 1987

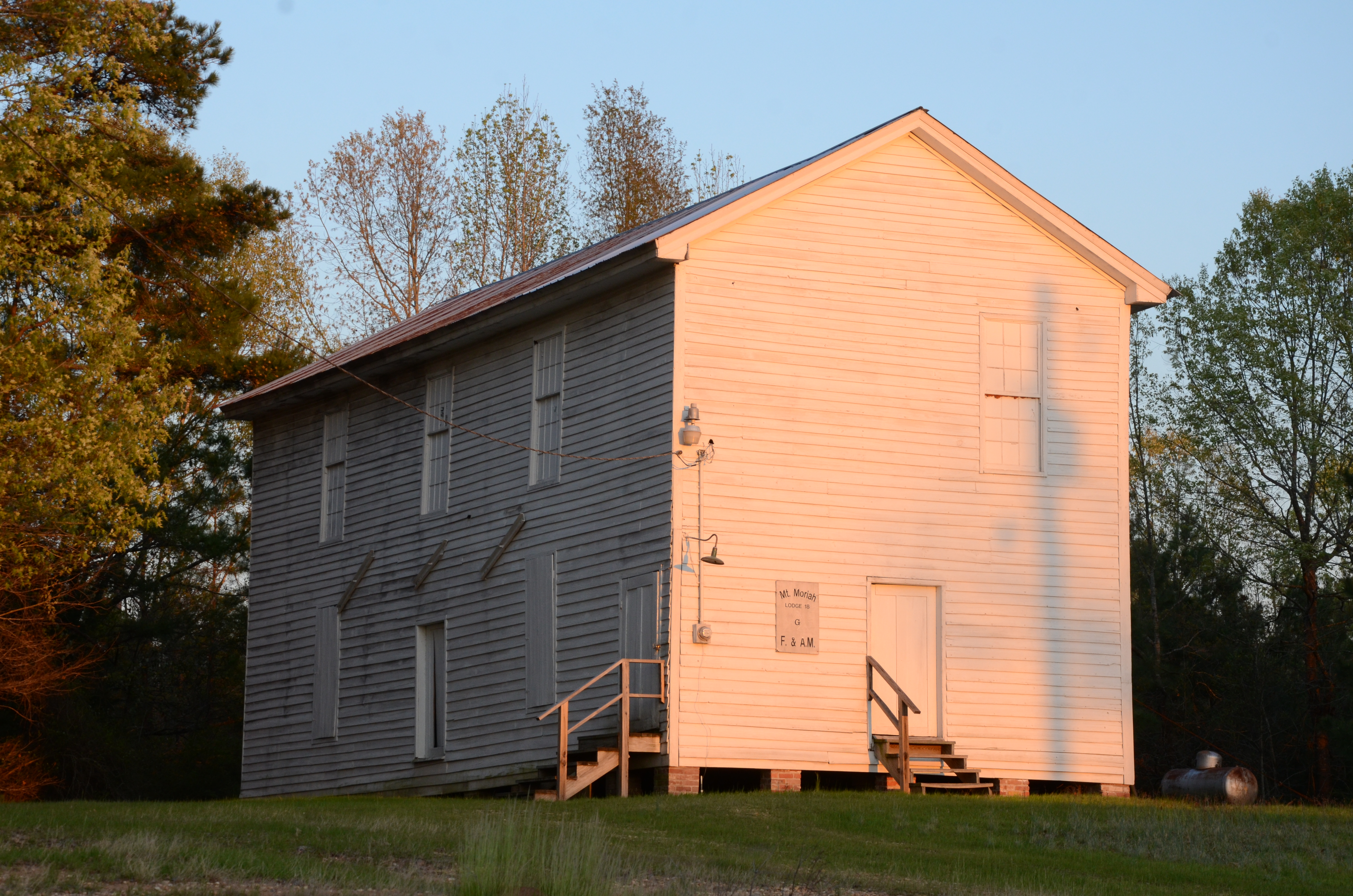
Mount Moriah Masonic Lodge No. 18

The Mount Moriah Masonic Lodge No. 18 is a historic building in Lisbon, Arkansas, US. The two-story wood frame lodge building was built in 1858, and is virtually unaltered. It has several distinctive construction features, including 12" by 12" timber posts that rise the full two stories at its corners; this feature is believed to be unique in the state. It was built as a meeting hall a local chapter of Freemasons, and is the oldest purpose-built Masonic hall still used for that purpose in Arkansas.

The building was listed on the National Register of Historic Places in 1987.

== See also ==
- National Register of Historic Places listings in Union County, Arkansas
