= D. McDonald House =

Historic house in Arkansas, United States

- U.S. National Register of Historic Places
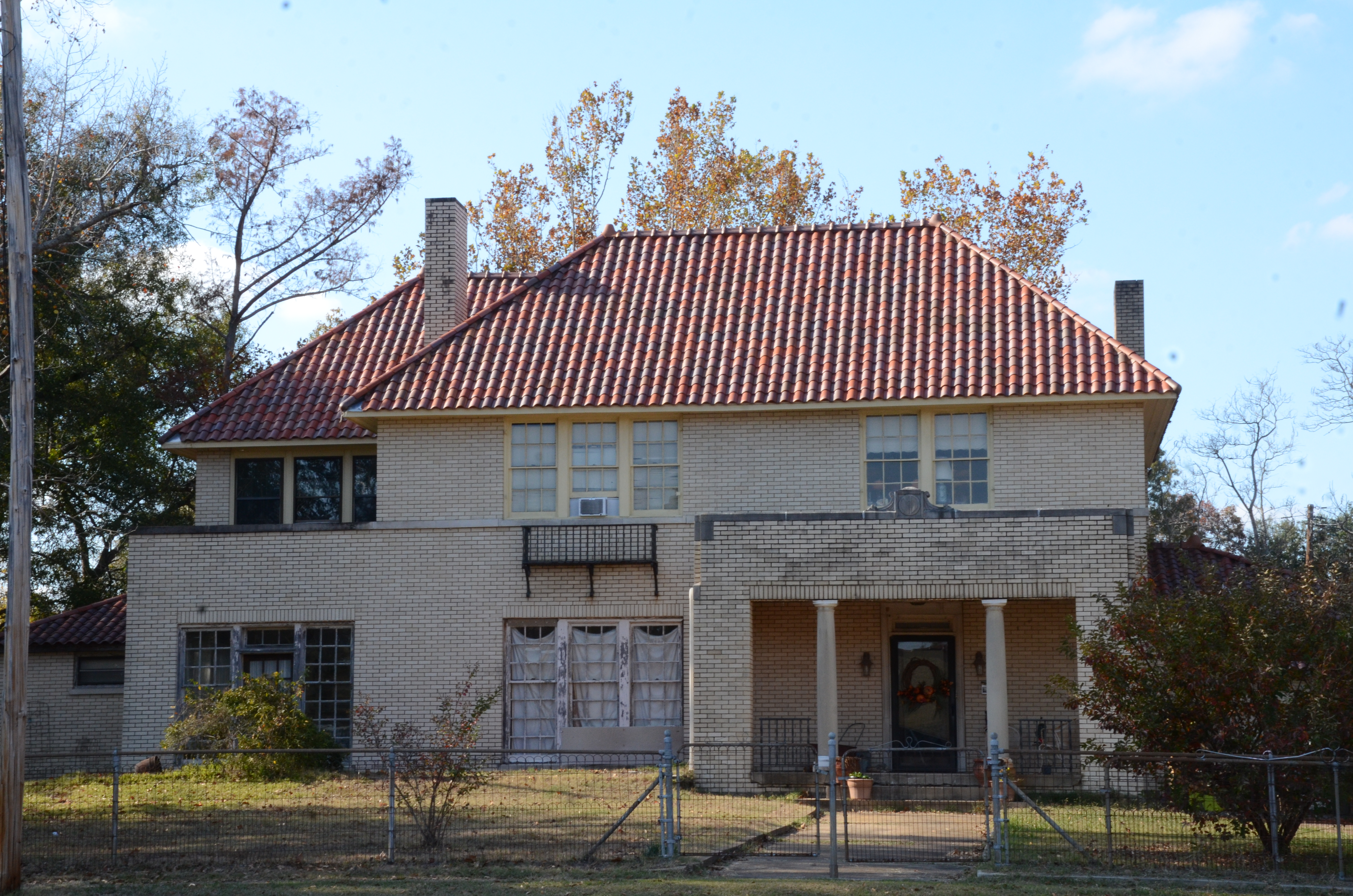

- Location within Arkansas Location within the United States
- Location: 800 S. Broadway, Smackover, Arkansas
- Coordinates: 33°21′49″N 92°43′33″W
- Area: less than one acre
- Architectural style: Late 19th And 20th Century Revivals, Mediterranean Revival
- NRHP reference No.: 90001949
- Added to NRHP: December 27, 1990

The D. McDonald House is a historic house at 800 South Broadway in Smackover, Arkansas. The two-story brick house was built in 1928-29 by DeKalb McDonald, during the oil boom that hit Union County in the 1920s. It is one of the more unusual houses in the town, exhibiting Craftsman styling with a Mediterranean flair. The house has irregular massing, with a main block and a number of projecting porches and ells. The main block and projections generally have hipped roofs finished in red tile with significant overhangs. The western elevation includes a porte cochere. Significant original period detailing remains on the interior of the house, despite the application of paneling to the walls.

The house was listed on the National Register of Historic Places in 1990.

== See also ==
- National Register of Historic Places listings in Union County, Arkansas
