= Joel Smith House =

Historic house in Arkansas, United States

- U.S. National Register of Historic Places
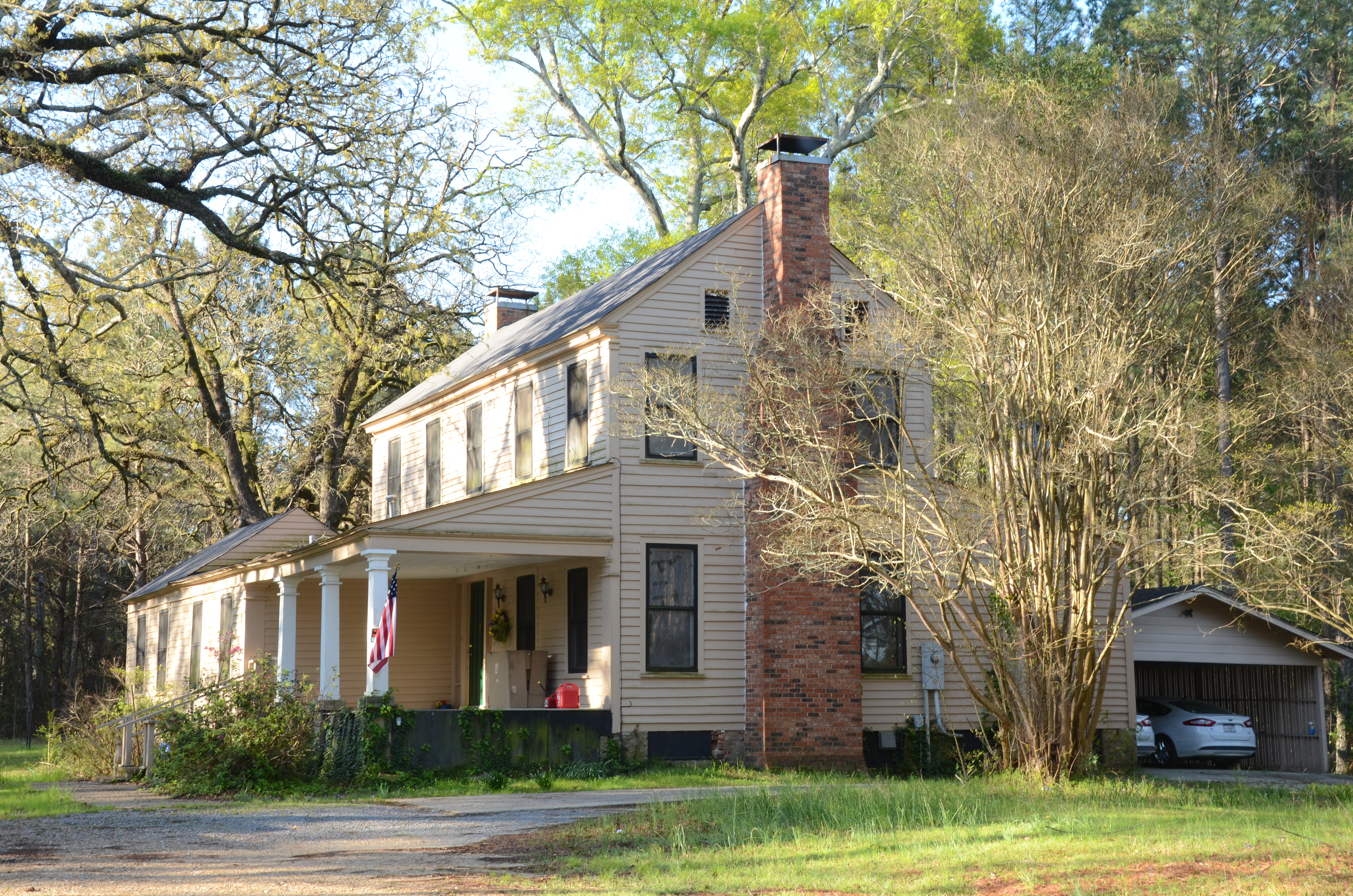

- Location within Arkansas Location within the United States
- Location: Jct. of US 167 and Co. Rd. 5, El Dorado, Arkansas
- Coordinates: 33°7′38″N 92°38′19″W
- Area: 4 acres (1.6 ha)
- Built: 1840
- Built by: Joel N. Smith
- Architectural style: I-House
- NRHP reference No.: 90001220
- Added to NRHP: August 31, 1990

The Joel Smith House is a historic house at the northeast corner of the junction of United States Route 167 and County Route 5 in rural Union County, Arkansas. Built c. 1840, this two-story vernacular I-house was the home of Joel Smith, one of the first white settlers of Union County. The house is a rare surviving early example of a typical colonial-style house with matching shed-roof side porches. The property is also thought likely to yield archaeological finds useful in assessing and understanding frontier life in the area.

The house was listed on the National Register of Historic Places in 1990.

== See also ==
- National Register of Historic Places listings in Union County, Arkansas
