= Henry Crawford McKinney House =

Historic house in Arkansas, United States

- U.S. National Register of Historic Places
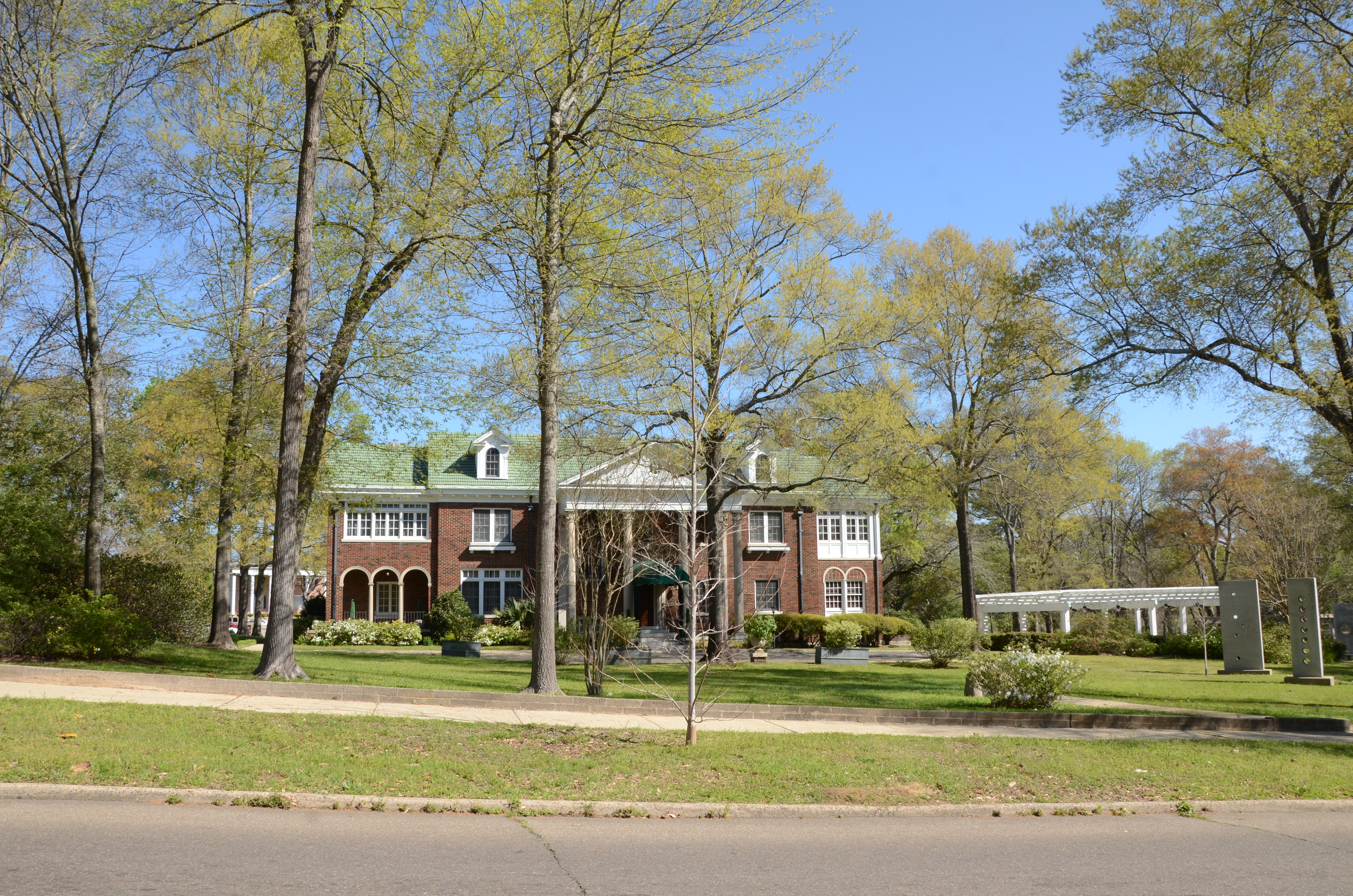

- Location within Arkansas Location within the United States
- Location: 510 E. Faulkner, El Dorado, Arkansas
- Coordinates: 33.2151°N 92.65902°W
- Area: 3.5 acres (1.4 ha)
- Built: 1925
- Architect: Charles L. Thompson
- Architectural style: Classical Revival
- NRHP reference No.: 83001157
- Added to NRHP: September 1, 1983

The Henry Crawford McKinney House is a historic house at 510 East Faulkner Street in El Dorado, Arkansas. The 2 1/2-story red brick and stucco house was designed by Charles L. Thompson and built in 1925; it is one of the most elegant houses in the city, and is set on an elaborately landscaped parcel. The house was built for Henry Crawford McKinney, Sr., a prominent local landowner and banker, during the height of El Dorado's oil boom. Its interior decoration was done by Paul Heerwagen, best known for his murals in the Arkansas State Capitol.

The house was listed on the National Register of Historic Places in 1983.

== See also ==
- National Register of Historic Places listings in Union County, Arkansas
