= Scotland Cemetery =

Historic cemetery in Arkansas, United States

- U.S. National Register of Historic Places
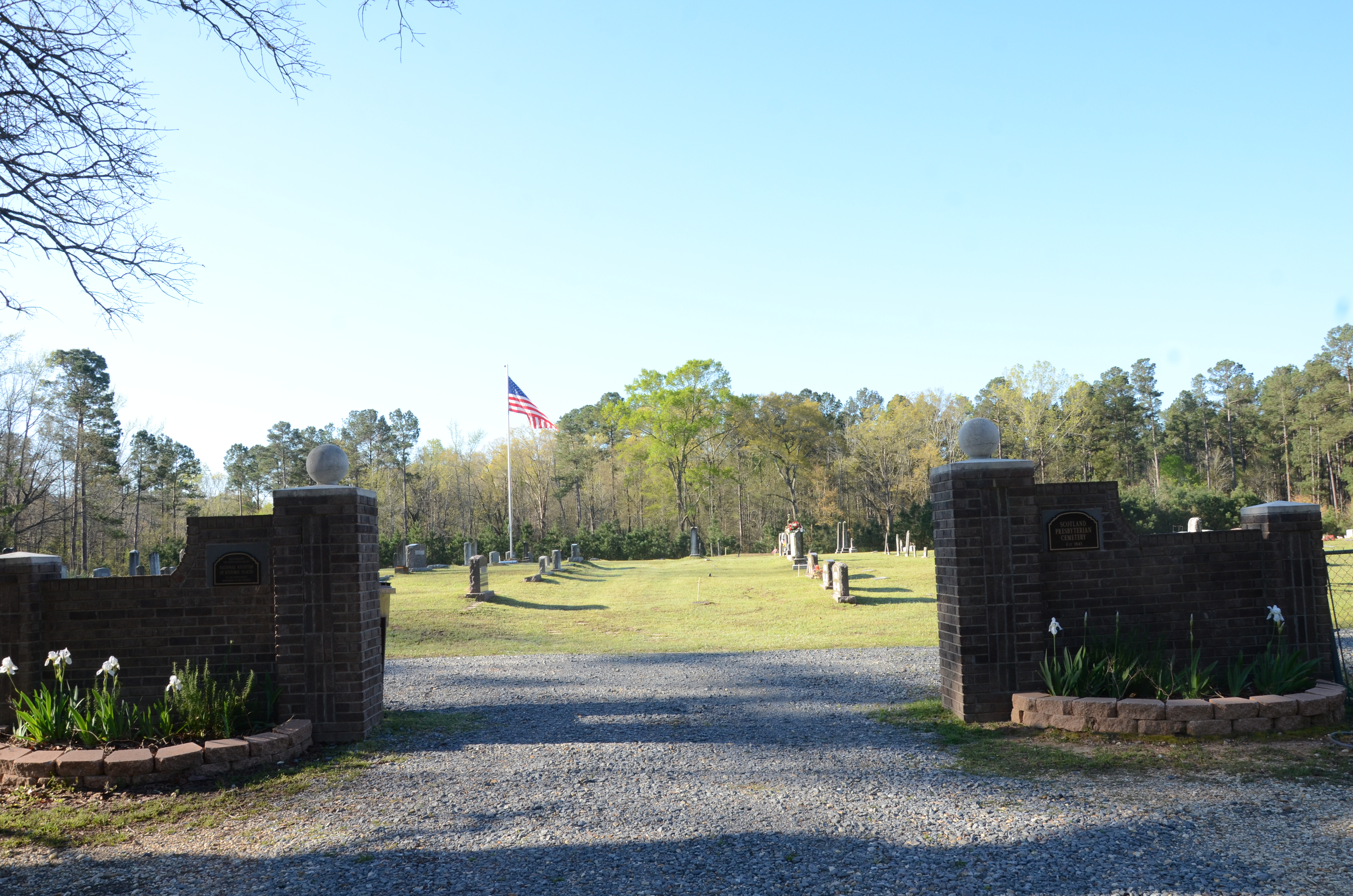

- Location within Arkansas Location within the United States
- Nearest city: Junction City, Arkansas
- Coordinates: 33°2′59″N 92°45′3″W
- Area: 4 acres (1.6 ha)
- NRHP reference No.: 05001081
- Added to NRHP: September 28, 2005

The Scotland Cemetery is a historic cemetery in Scotland, an unincorporated community in rural Union County, Arkansas. It is located about 3 miles (4.8 km) west of Junction City, off US Route 167 south of the Scotland Presbyterian Church. The cemetery was formally established in 1861, but had been used as a burying ground since the first settlers arrived in the area in the 1840s. It is the only tangible remnant of the community's early days; the nearby church is the third to stand on the site. The earliest grave with a known date is 1842; the cemetery has more than 30 unmarked graves, including some that are probable graves of slaves.

The cemetery was listed on the National Register of Historic Places in 2005, at which time it was still open for additional burials.

== See also ==
- National Register of Historic Places listings in Union County, Arkansas
