= Municipal Building (El Dorado, Arkansas) =

- U.S. National Register of Historic Places
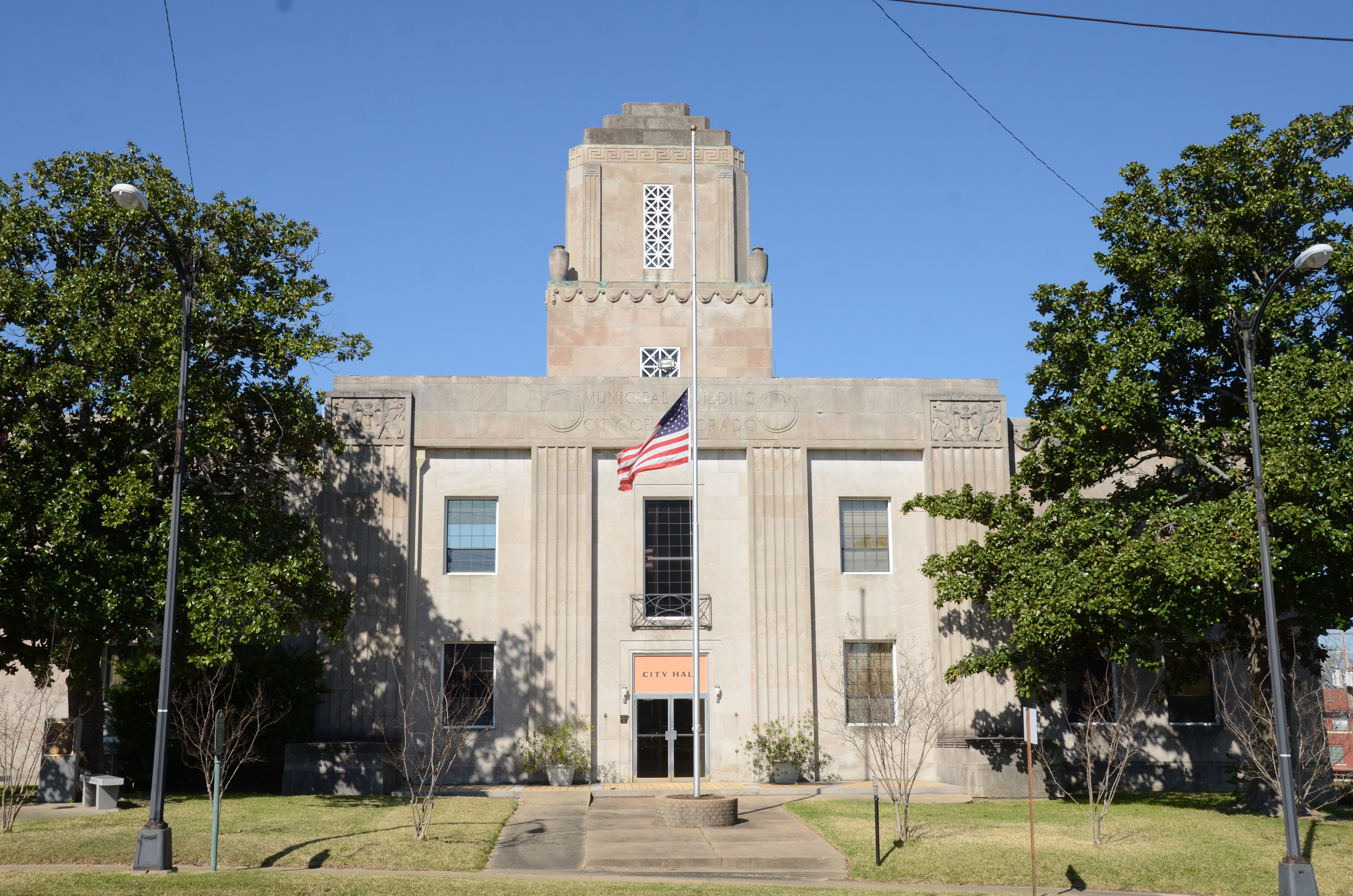

- Location within Arkansas Location within the United States
- Location: 204 N. West Ave., El Dorado, Arkansas
- Coordinates: 33°12′43″N 92°39′50″W
- Area: less than one acre
- Built: 1927
- Architect: Mann & Stern
- Architectural style: Classical Revival, Modern Movement
- NRHP reference No.: 83001167
- Added to NRHP: June 30, 1983

The Municipal Building, or City Hall, of El Dorado, Arkansas is located at 204 North West Street.

== Description and history ==
The two-story masonry building was designed by Eugene John Stern and built in 1927, during El Dorado's oil boom years. The front and sides are finished in dressed limestone, while the rear is finished in buff brick. The main facade has a combination of Classical Revival and Art Deco features, with a central projecting entry with a three-story tower.

The building was listed on the National Register of Historic Places on June 30, 1983.

== See also ==
- National Register of Historic Places listings in Union County, Arkansas
