= Henley-Riley Houses =

- U.S. National Register of Historic Places
- U.S. Historic district
- Location within Arkansas Location within the United States
- Location: 2523 and 2525 Calion Rd., El Dorado, Arkansas
- Coordinates: 33°14′14″N 92°39′25″W
- Area: 3.8 acres (1.5 ha)
- Built: 1959
- Architect: Jones, E. Fay
- Architectural style: Modern
- NRHP reference No.: 100001235
- Added to NRHP: June 26, 2017

The Henley-Riley Houses are a pair of Modern Movement houses at 2523 and 2525 Calion Road in El Dorado, Arkansas. The two houses were designed by noted Arkansas architect E. Fay Jones, and were built between 1959 and 1961. They were built for Dr. Paul Henley, a prominent local physician, and his brother-in-law, James Neal Riley. The Henley House is a single-story U-shaped structure, its exterior finished wooden batten board; the interior of the U is nearly entirely composed of glass, making the courtyard a prominent space in the design.

The house was listed on the National Register of Historic Places in 2017.

== See also ==
- National Register of Historic Places listings in Union County, Arkansas
