= South Arkansas College =

Community college in El Dorado, Arkansas, U.S.

Coordinates: 33°12′34″N 92°39′58″W

- Type: Public community college
- Location: El Dorado, Arkansas, United States
- Website: www.southark.edu

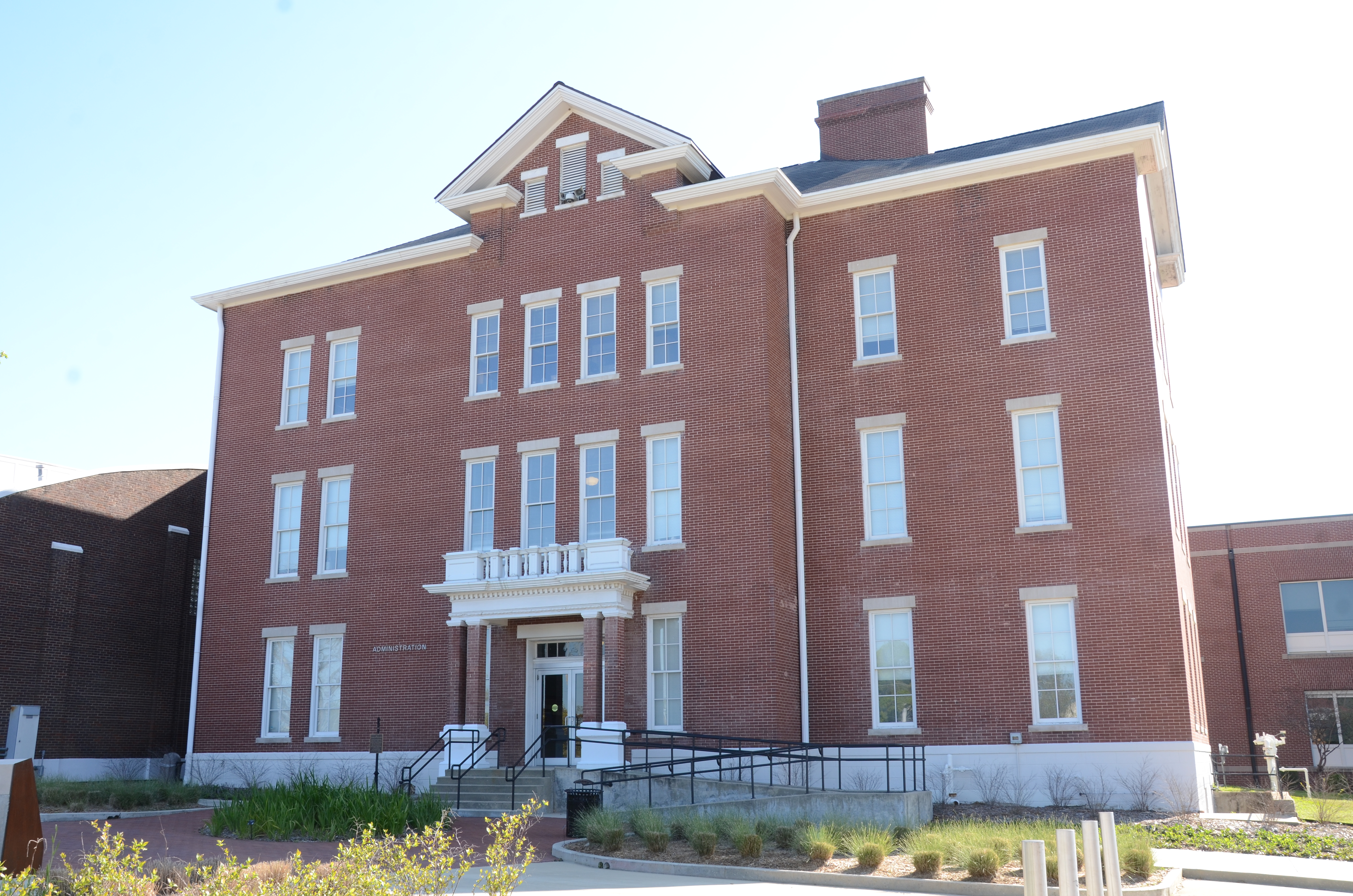
The Thomas Building of South Arkansas College in El Dorado, Arkansas

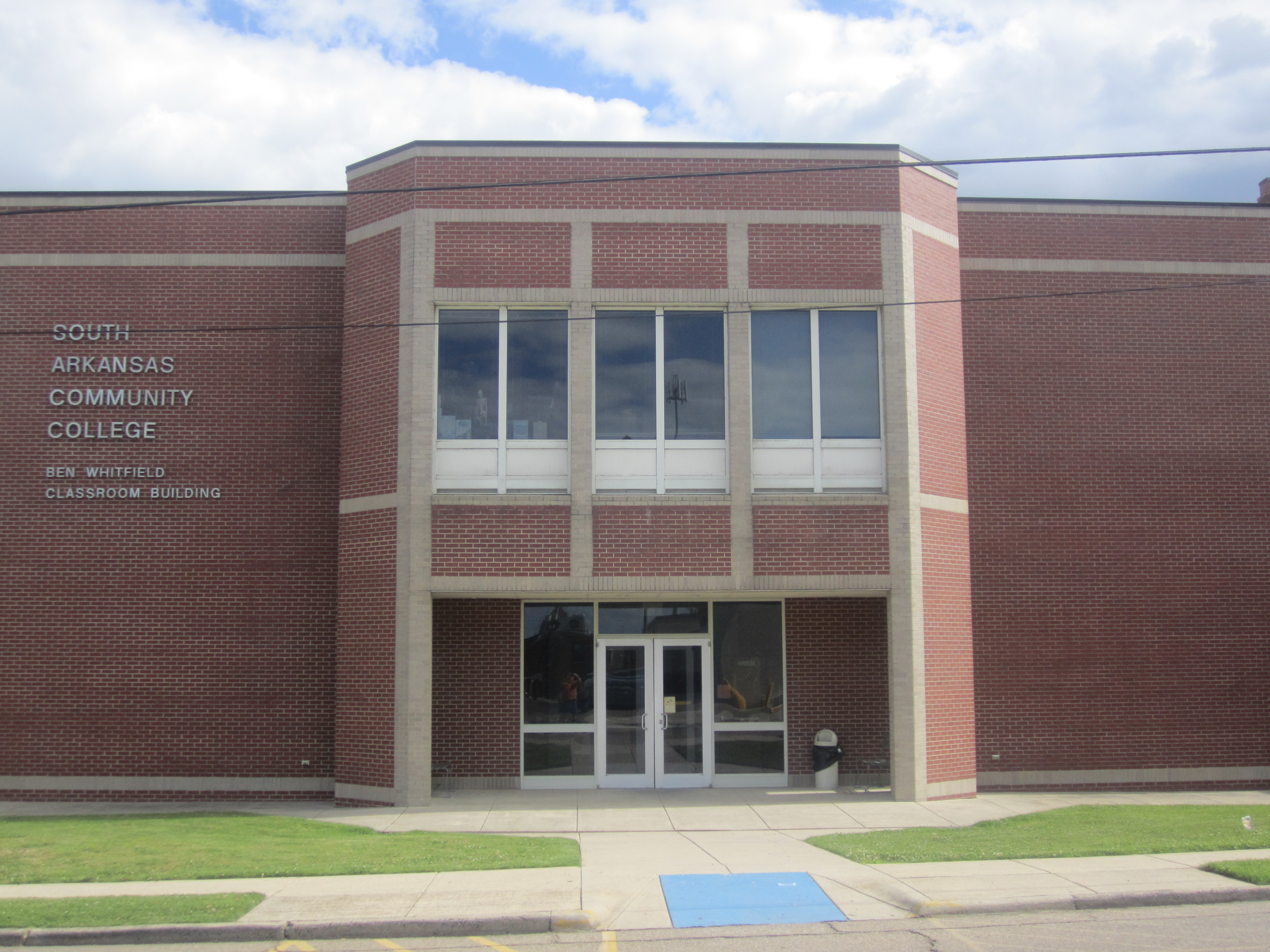
Whitfield Building

South Arkansas College (SouthArk) is a public community college in El Dorado, Arkansas.

South Arkansas College, commonly known as "SouthArk," is a public, comprehensive community college with an open-door policy, providing educational programs, junior college athletics, workforce development, civic and cultural enrichment, and support services.

Formed from a merger of the El Dorado branch of Southern Arkansas University and Oil Belt Technical College, South Arkansas Community College was approved by a 62 percent majority vote in Union County in March 1992. Then Governor Bill Clinton appointed a nine-member Board of Trustees, and all assets and liabilities of Oil Belt and SAU-El Dorado were transferred by June 30, 1992, to SouthArk. The former Oil Belt campus became known as the East Campus and the former SAU-El Dorado the West Campus.

The college's name was changed legally to South Arkansas College on July 1, 2023. The decision was made in an effort to reflect better the college's standing as a regional institution.

== Athletics ==
In the 2019–2020 academic year, the college began intercollegiate athletics, starting men's and women's basketball programs. The team mascot is the Stars.

In 2022, women's softball and men's baseball were added.

The program competes in Division II of the National Junior College Athletic Association Division, in Region 2.

The 2023 South Arkansas College Stars baseball team won the NJCAA DII Region 2 regular season championship and the NJCAA DII Plains District championship. The Stars went on to the 2023 NJCAA DII World Series and finished in the top five teams, with a 47–18 final record. It was the first time that an Arkansas team ever competed in a JUCO World Series.

== See also ==
- El Dorado Junior College Building
- W. F. & Estelle McWilliams House
- South Arkansas Arboretum
