= El Dorado Confederate Monument =

- U.S. National Register of Historic Places
- U.S. Historic district – Contributing property
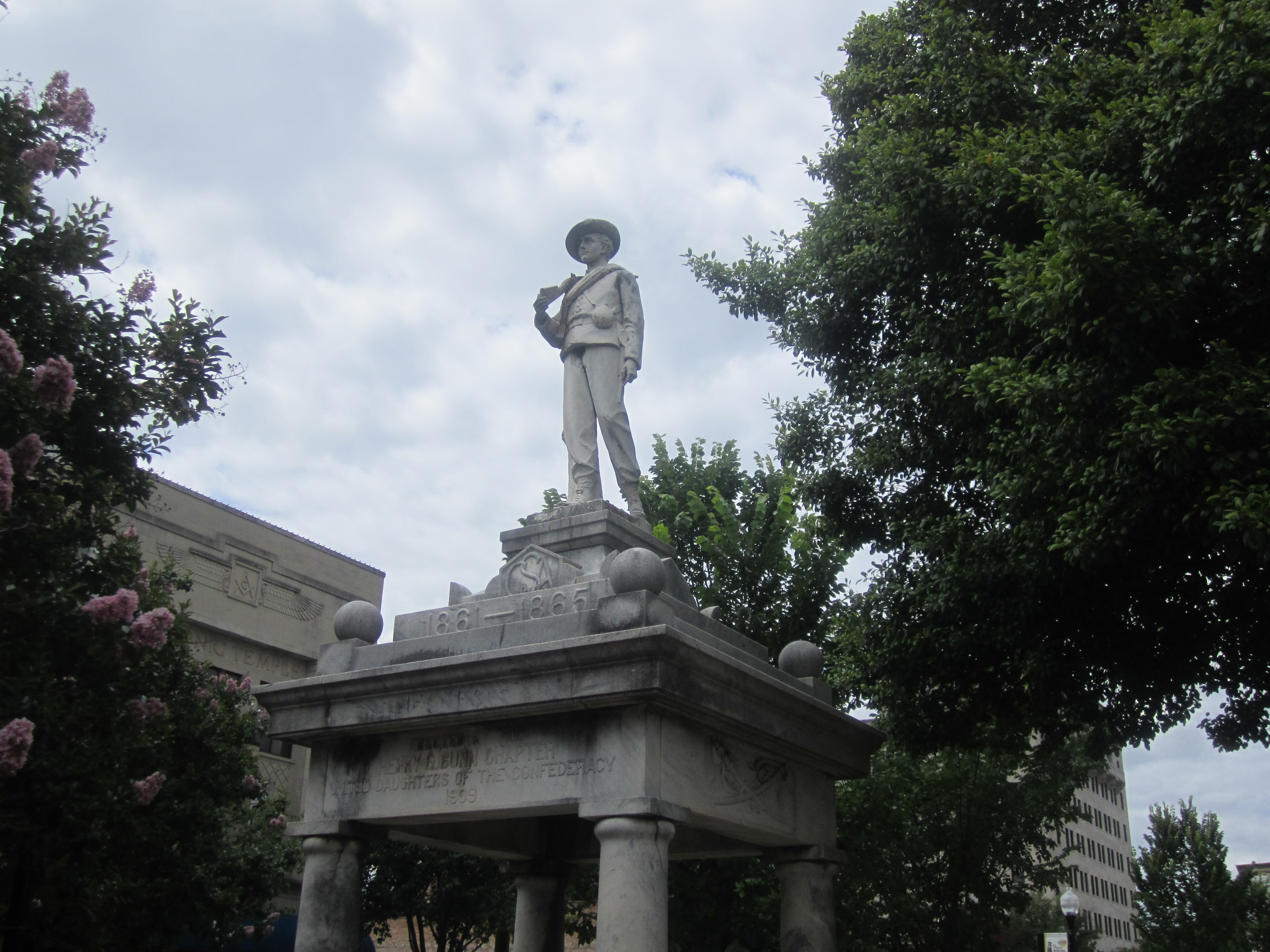

- Location within Arkansas Location within the United States
- Location: Courthouse Lawn, near jct. of N. Main St. and S. Washington, El Dorado, Arkansas
- Coordinates: 33°12′43″N 92°39′48″W
- Area: less than one acre
- Built: 1910
- Architectural style: Classical Revival
- Part of: El Dorado Commercial Historic District (ID03000773)
- MPS: Civil War Commemorative Sculpture MPS
- NRHP reference No.: 96000463

Significant dates
- Added to NRHP: April 26, 1996
- Designated CP: August 21, 2003

The El Dorado Confederate Monument is located on the grounds of the Union County Courthouse in El Dorado, Arkansas, near the corner of North Main and South Washington Streets. It consists of a statue of a Confederate Army soldier in mid-stride, mounted on top of a temple-like structure supported by four cannon-shaped Ionic columns. The columns support a lintel structure bearing inscriptions on three sides, above which is a tiered roof with cannonballs at the corners. The temple structure is 15 feet (4.6 m) high, and 10 feet (3.0 m) square; the statue measures 76 inches (1.9 m) by 28 inches (0.71 m) by 28 inches (0.71 m). Both the statue and the temple are constructed of gray/blue striated marble.

The monument was built in 1910 at a cost of over $2,800, and was paid for by the local chapter of the United Daughters of the Confederacy. It is believed to be the first fountain-style Confederate monument in the South. The front (south) side of the monument is inscribed "CSA 1861 - 1865 / ERECTED BY THE HENRY G. BUNN CHAPTER / UNITED DAUGHTERS OF THE CONFEDERACY / 1909". The north side is inscribed "'TRUTH CRUSHED TO EARTH SHALL RISE AGAIN.' / 'EVEN DEATH CANNOT SEVER THE CORDS OF MEMORY.'" The western lintel reads "'IN HONOR OF THE CONFEDERATE SOLDIERS / OF UNION COUNTY, ARK.'". The eastern lintel has a pair of crossed swords on it.

The monument was listed on the National Register of Historic Places in 1996. It was included in the El Dorado Commercial Historic District in 2003.

The statue was one of several monuments that became the center of controversy during the 2020 Black Lives Matter protests.

== See also ==
- National Register of Historic Places listings in Union County, Arkansas
