= El Dorado Junior College Building =

- U.S. National Register of Historic Places
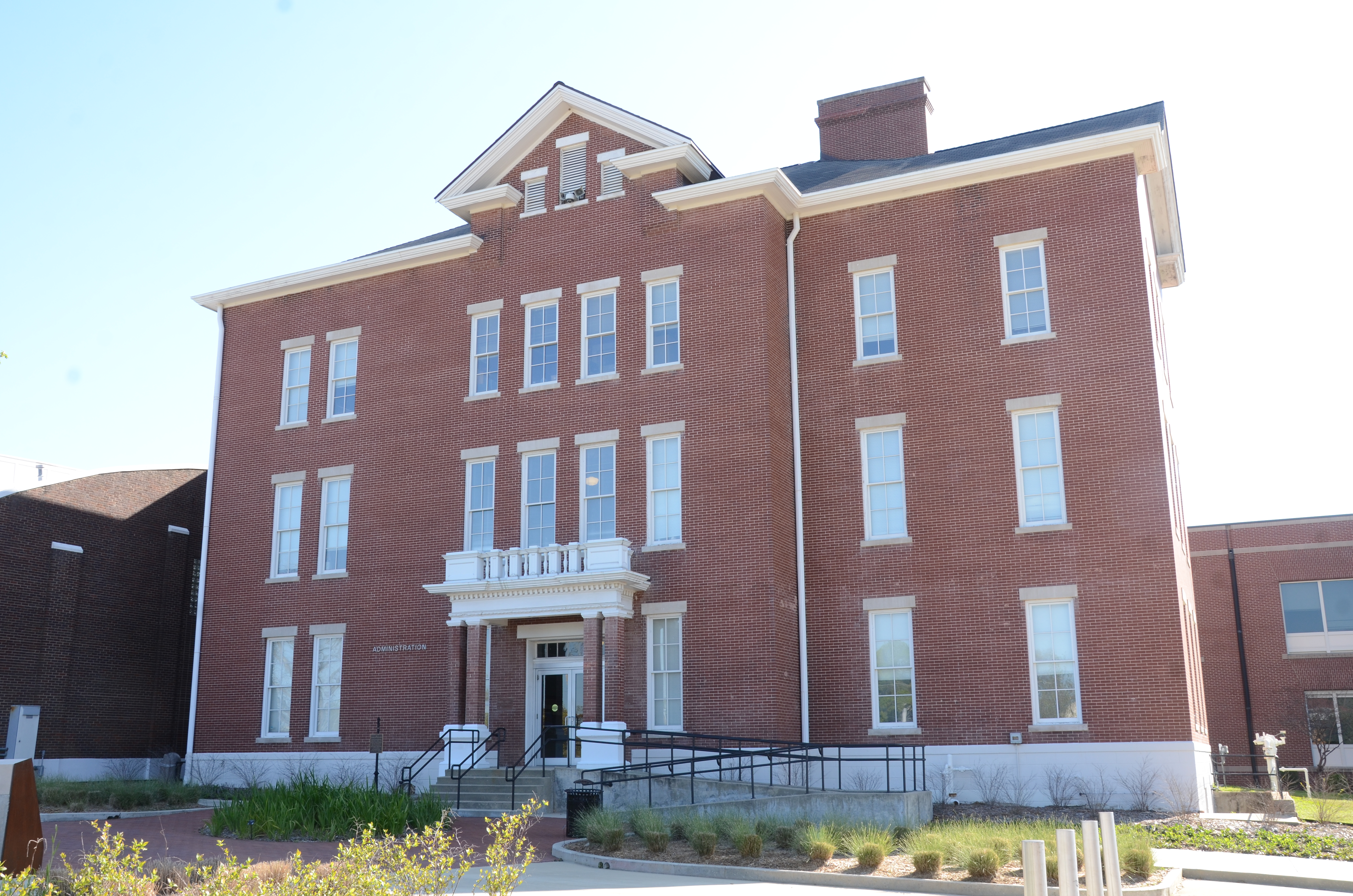

- Location within Arkansas Location within the United States
- Location: 300 S. West Ave., El Dorado, Arkansas
- Coordinates: 33°12′34″N 92°39′58″W
- Area: less than one acre
- Built: 1905
- Built by: J.F. Hanson; Works Progress Administration
- Architect: John B. Abbott
- Architectural style: Classical Revival, Art Deco
- NRHP reference No.: 78000633
- Added to NRHP: September 13, 1978

The El Dorado Junior College Building is a historic academic building at 300 South West Avenue in El Dorado, Arkansas. The three-story brick building was built in 1905 as a public school building for the county's white students. From 1925 to 1937 the building house El Dorado Junior College, the first such institution in southwestern Arkansas; it has seen a variety of public and private academic uses since then. The building is shaped roughly like a swastika, and has retained most of its external and internal Classical Revival style.

The building was listed on the National Register of Historic Places in 1978. It is now part of the South Arkansas Community College campus.

== See also ==
- W. F. & Estelle McWilliams House: Also on the SouthArk campus
- South Arkansas Arboretum: operated by SouthArk
- National Register of Historic Places listings in Union County, Arkansas
