= Rumph Mortuary =

Historic building in El Dorado, Arkansas, US

- Perry’s Funeral Chapel
- U.S. National Register of Historic Places
- Location within Arkansas Location within the United States
- Location: 312 W. Oak, El Dorado, Arkansas
- Coordinates: 33°12′49″N 92°39′58″W
- Area: less than one acre
- Built: 1927
- Architectural style: Gothic Revival
- NRHP reference No.: 100001237
- Added to NRHP: June 26, 2017

Perry’s Funeral Chapel, known for many years as Rumph Mortuary, is a historic commercial building at 312 West Oak Street in El Dorado, Arkansas. Built in 1927, it is a two-story red brick building, with a three-bay facade topped by a crenellated Gothic parapet. Charles Rumph, known as “C.B.”, came to El Dorado in the early 1920’s after the passing of his mother Martha Proctor Rumph, one of the original owners of Proctor Funeral Home in Camden, Arkansas. C.B. Rumph originally partnered with W.F. McWilliams, a local banker and furniture store owner. Their first location was on the corner of Elm and Cleveland and went by Rumph & McWilliams Undertaking. Rumph was the mortician and McWilliams supplied the caskets through his furniture store and the ambulances through his Studebaker dealership. However, in 1927 Rumph opened on his own and died young, forcing his two sons Tom and Dudley to become morticians and take over the operation. Through those years the funeral home was known as Rumph Mortuary, Rumph Undertaking & Ambulance Service, Rumph Funeral Directors, and Rumph Funeral Home. The firm had several owners after Tom and Dudley Rumph handed it down and several name changes all including the original Rumph name. Then in 2003 the name changed to Perry’s Funeral Chapel. This is the oldest funeral home in Arkansas and it has remained mostly untouched and unchanged as a monument to the oldest and noblest profession: undertaking.

The building was listed on the National Register of Historic Places in 2017.

== See also ==
- National Register of Historic Places listings in Union County, Arkansas
