= South Arkansas Arboretum =

Botanical Garden in El Dorado, Arkansas

Coordinates: 33.2181°N 92.6846°W

The South Arkansas Arboretum is an arboretum and botanical garden owned by the local school system but operated as Arkansas's 50th state park by the South Arkansas College. It is located next to the former El Dorado High School in El Dorado, Arkansas, USA and open daily except for holidays.

The 3-acre (1.2 ha) arboretum features plants indigenous to the Piney Woods region, plus flowering azaleas and camellias. Signs identify many of the trees, including shortleaf and loblolly pines, southern and sweet bay magnolias, black gum, white ash, American sycamore, Carolina beech, American holly, black cherry, sugar maple, and oak species such as water, post, southern red, white and overcup.

Opened in 1965, the arboretum is Arkansas's only state park located within a city. It includes more than two miles (3 km) of paved trails.

== See also ==
- El Dorado Junior College Building: Also on the SouthArk campus
- W. F. & Estelle McWilliams House: Also on the SouthArk campus
- List of botanical gardens in the United States
