= J. H. McWilliams House =

Historic house in Arkansas, United States

- U.S. National Register of Historic Places
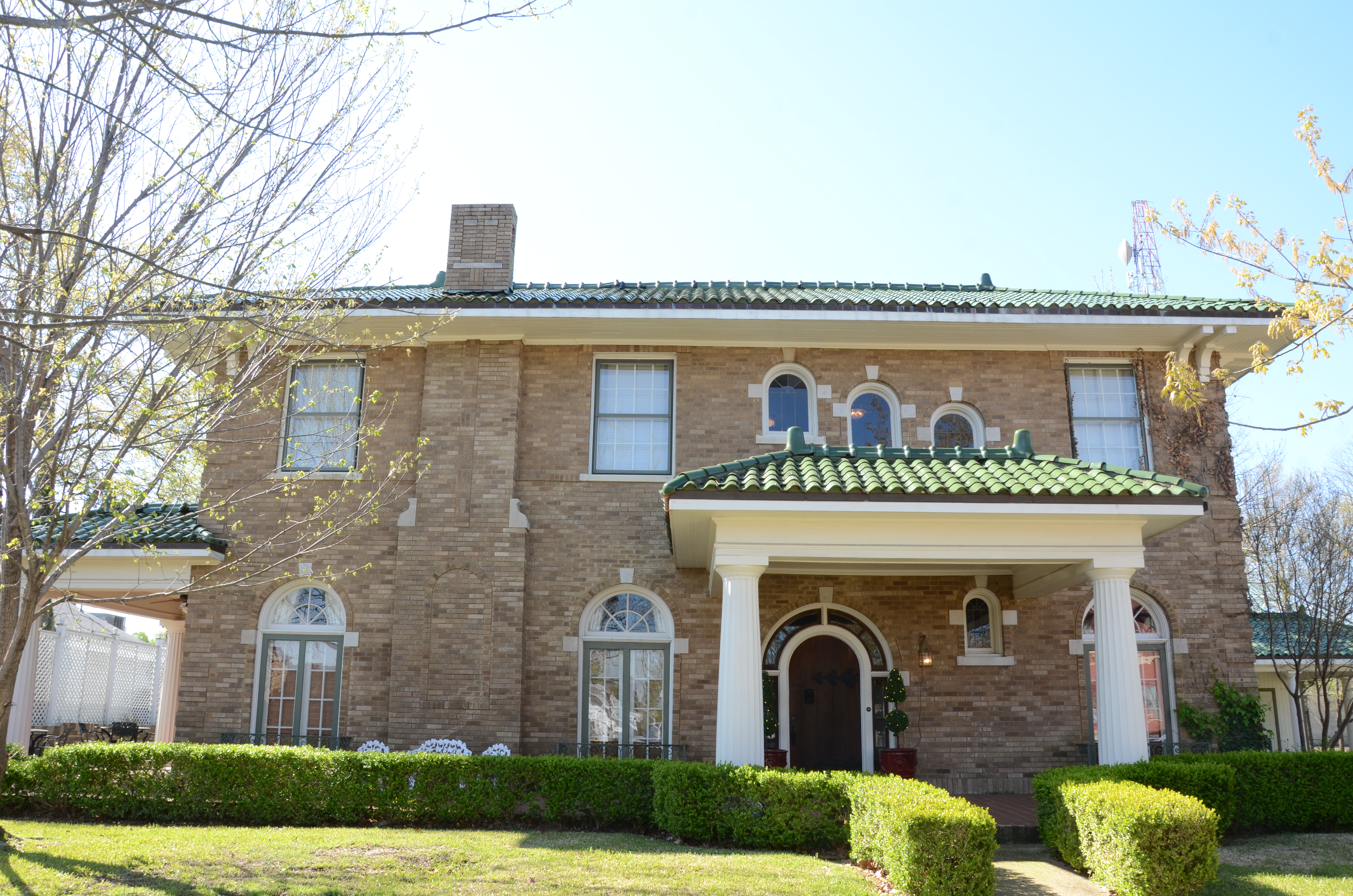

- Location within Arkansas Location within the United States
- Location: 323 West Oak St., El Dorado, Arkansas
- Coordinates: 33°12′38″N 92°39′47″W
- Area: 0.3 acres (0.12 ha)
- Built: 1925
- Architect: Kolben, Hunter and Boyd
- Architectural style: Mission/Spanish Revival
- NRHP reference No.: 02001044
- Added to NRHP: September 12, 2002

The J. H. McWilliams House is a historic house at 323 West Oak Street in El Dorado, Arkansas. This two story brick house was built in 1925–26, during the city's oil boom years. It is the last surviving house out of a row of "oil boom" mansions which originally lined Oak Street. The house is built out of buff brick, and has Mediterranean styling. It was in the McWilliams family until the early 1970s, and then saw a variety of commercial uses, declining in condition. In the early 2000s it was restored.

The house was listed on the National Register of Historic Places in 2002.

== See also ==
- National Register of Historic Places listings in Union County, Arkansas
