= H.O. McCurry =

Canadian art curator

Harry Orr McCurry (1889–1964), known as H.O. McCurry, was a prominent civil servant who served as the director of the National Gallery of Canada (1939-1955).

Born in Ottawa, Ontario on August 21, 1889, McCurry was married to Dorothy Lampman Jenkins, a musician and figure skating champion of Canada, and the niece of poet Archibald Lampman. The McCurrys were members of their Christian Science church.

McCurry began his association with the National Gallery of Canada in 1919 as Assistant Director. In 1939, he succeeded Eric Brown as the second director of the National Gallery of Canada after Brown's sudden death. His career highlights include a high-profile acquisition of a group of important Renaissance paintings from the collection of the Prince of Lichtenstein. This contributed to the Gallery's rising profile. His other purchases include works of Post-Impressionism and the Old Masters.

McCurry was also a strong advocate of the Gallery's outreach and national art education programs. During the 1930 and 1940s time the National Gallery of Canada took an active leadership role in disseminating art across the country and McCurry was very involved with numerous arts and institutions. He managed the distribution of Carnegie money to galleries in Canada, oversaw the galleries loan program, and advised emerging directors and galleries as well as backing the Sampson-Matthews silkscreen project.

McCurry retired in 1955, after sixteen years of service as director. He died in Ottawa, on May 14, 1964.
