= Smith-McCurry House =

Historic house in Arkansas, United States

- U.S. National Register of Historic Places
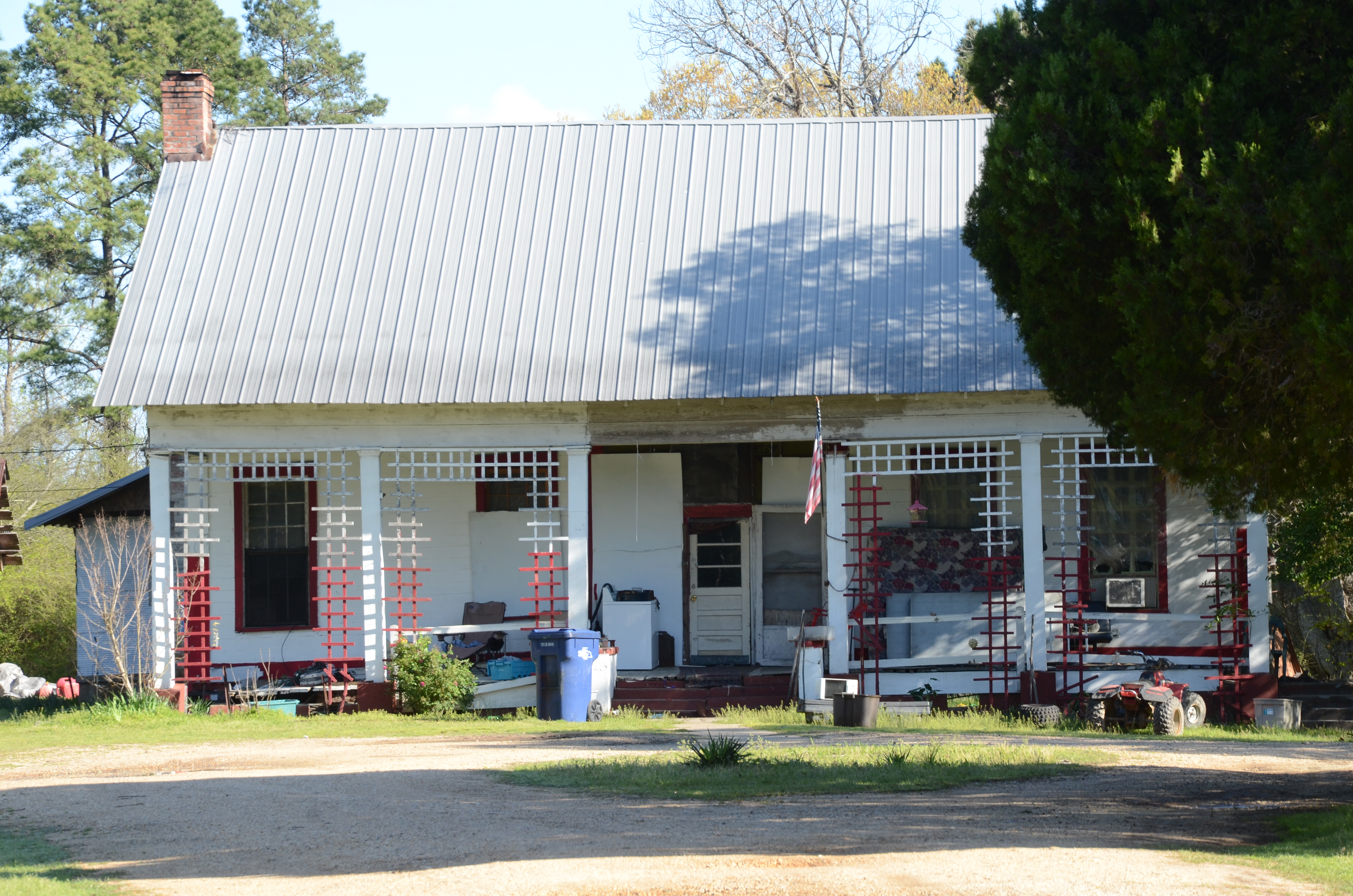

- Location within Arkansas Location within the United States
- Nearest city: El Dorado, Arkansas
- Coordinates: 33°13′16″N 92°35′26″W
- Area: 5 acres (2.0 ha)
- Built: 1867
- Architectural style: Bungalow/craftsman, Greek Revival
- NRHP reference No.: 92001394
- Added to NRHP: October 15, 1992

The Smith-McCurry House is a historic house on Arkansas Highway 15, 3.5 miles (5.6 km) east of El Dorado, Arkansas. The oldest portion of the house is a single-story dog trot house that was built in 1867 by Lawson Smith for his son David Carroll Smith. The house was inherited in 1919 by Mamie Smith McCurry, notable as a prominent investor in early oil exploration in Union County. The third well in the county, a successful gusher, was drilled on her land. She then invested further in oil exploration, forming a partnership with Bruce Hunt, a geologist, and the drillers Hensy and Zoda, and eventually participating in exploratory drilling operations in seven states. She used proceeds from her oil successes to expand the homestead and add then-popular Craftsman details to it. The house was listed on the National Register of Historic Places in 1992.

== See also ==
- National Register of Historic Places listings in Union County, Arkansas
