= Lion Oil Exchange Building =

- Exchange Bank
- U.S. National Register of Historic Places
- U.S. Historic district – Contributing property
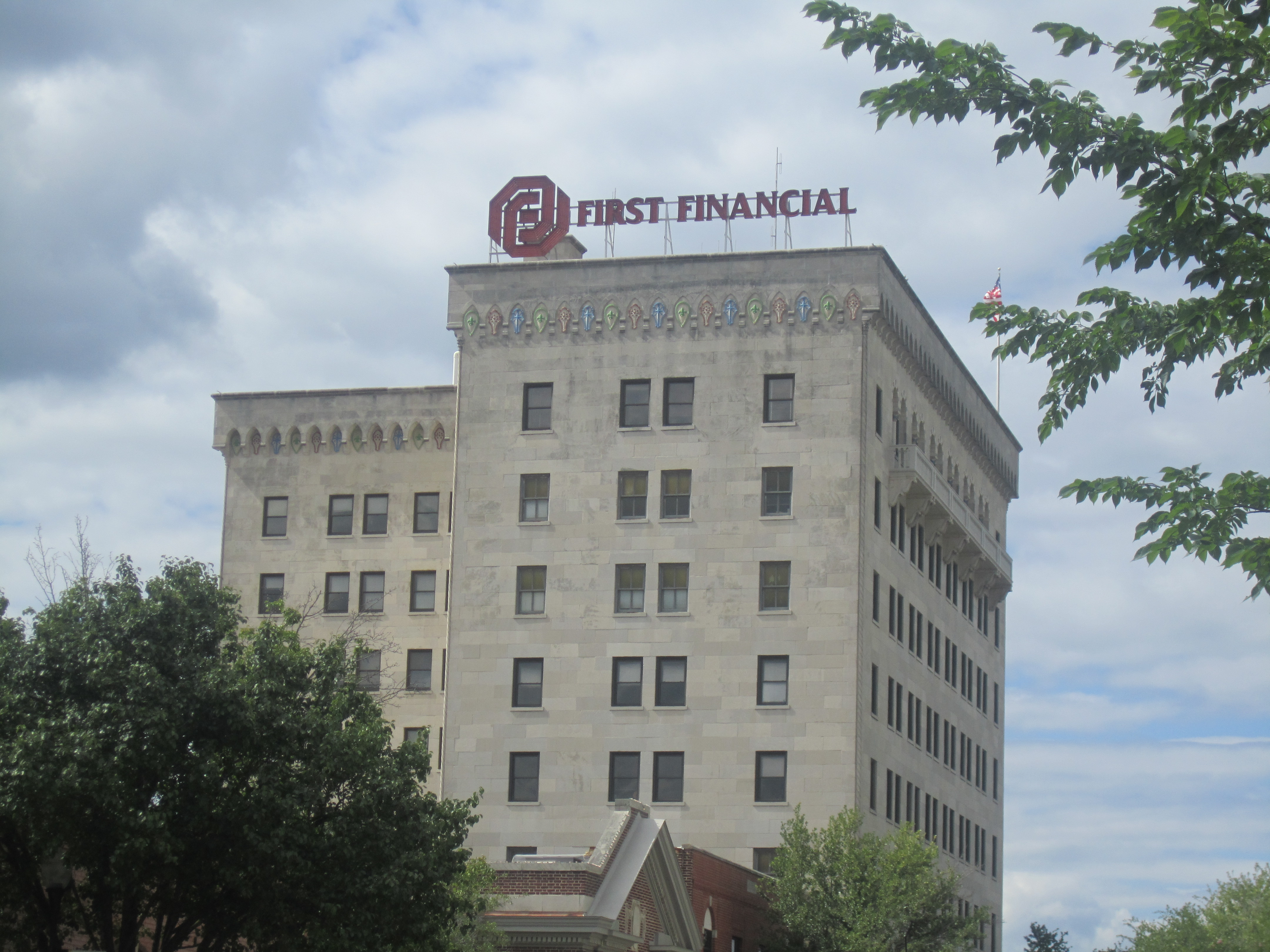

- Location within Arkansas Location within the United States
- Location: Washington and Oak Sts., El Dorado, Arkansas
- Coordinates: 33°12′47″N 92°39′49″W
- Area: less than one acre
- Built: 1927
- Architect: Mann & Stern
- Architectural style: Late 19th And 20th Century Revivals, Classical Revival, Venetian Gothic
- Part of: El Dorado Commercial Historic District (ID03000773)
- NRHP reference No.: 86003304

Significant dates
- Added to NRHP: December 16, 1986
- Designated CP: August 21, 2003

The Exchange Bank building, formerly the Lion Oil Headquarters, is a historic commercial building at Washington and Oak Streets in El Dorado, Arkansas. Built in 1926–27, the nine-story building was the first skyscraper in Union County, and it was the tallest building in El Dorado at the time of its listing on the National Register of Historic Places in 1986. It was designed by the Little Rock firm of Mann & Stern, and is an eclectic mix of Venetian-inspired Revival styles. It was built during El Dorado's oil boom, and housed the headquarters of Lion Oil. It was included in the El Dorado Commercial Historic District in 2003.

== See also ==
- National Register of Historic Places listings in Union County, Arkansas
