= Rialto Theatre (El Dorado, Arkansas) =

- U.S. National Register of Historic Places
- U.S. Historic district – Contributing property
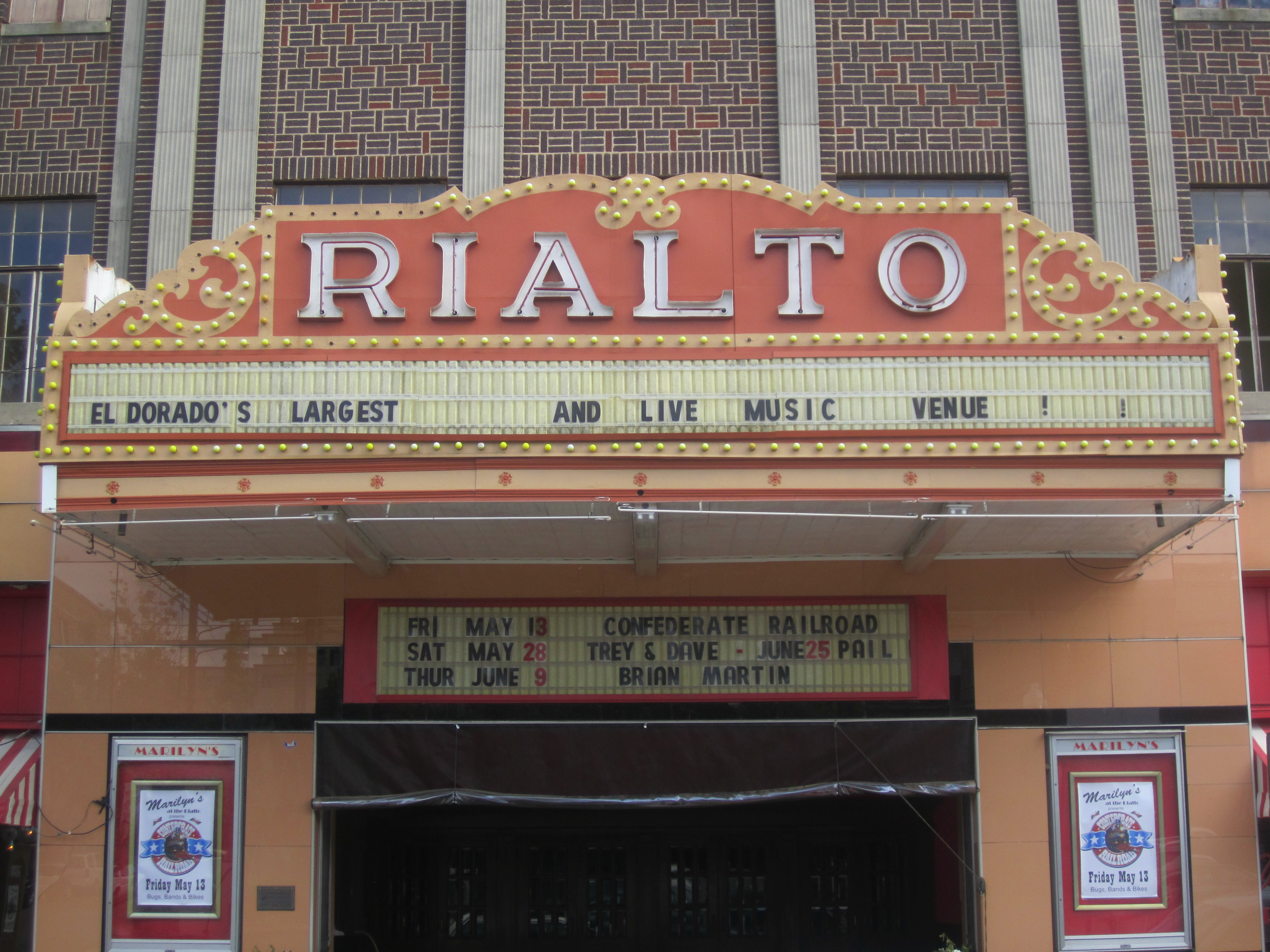

- Location within Arkansas Location within the United States
- Location: 117 E. Cedar St., El Dorado, Arkansas
- Coordinates: 33°12′38″N 92°39′47″W
- Area: less than one acre
- Built: 1929
- Architect: Kolben, Hunter & Boyd
- Architectural style: Egyptian Revival
- Part of: El Dorado Commercial Historic District (ID03000773)
- NRHP reference No.: 86001888

Significant dates
- Added to NRHP: August 21, 1986
- Designated CP: August 21, 2003

The Rialto Theatre is a historic performing venue at 117 East Cedar Street in downtown El Dorado, Arkansas. Built in 1929 during El Dorado's oil boom years, the theater is one of the best local examples of Classical Revival architecture, and is one of the largest and most elaborately decorated performing spaces in southern Arkansas. It was designed by the local firm of Kolben, Hunter and Boyd, and seats 1400. Its main entrance has Egyptian Revival details, and is flanked by storefronts. The brick of the front facade is laid in a basketweave pattern, and is topped by a stone frieze, cornice, and parapet. The interior of the theater is elaborately decorated. The theater was owned for many years by the McWilliams family. It was closed from 1980 to 1987 and then reopened as a three-screen movie theater that operated until 2006. The main lobby and concessions area operated briefly as a bar called Marilyn's. In 2012, it was purchased by the Murphy Arts District, who announced plans to restore it in phase two of its plans for revitalizing downtown El Dorado. The theater, which will have floor seating for 850 in addition to a full balcony, will host a variety of musical acts, plays, comedy shows, and movies.
