= Lisbon, Arkansas =

Historic populated place in Arkansas, US

Coordinates: 33°16′21″N 92°49′39″W

Lisbon, Arkansas is a location or community in Union County, Arkansas. It is the location of the Mount Moriah Masonic Lodge No. 18, which is listed on the National Register of Historic Places.
