= El Dorado Commercial Historic District =

Historic district in Arkansas, United States

- U.S. National Register of Historic Places
- U.S. Historic district
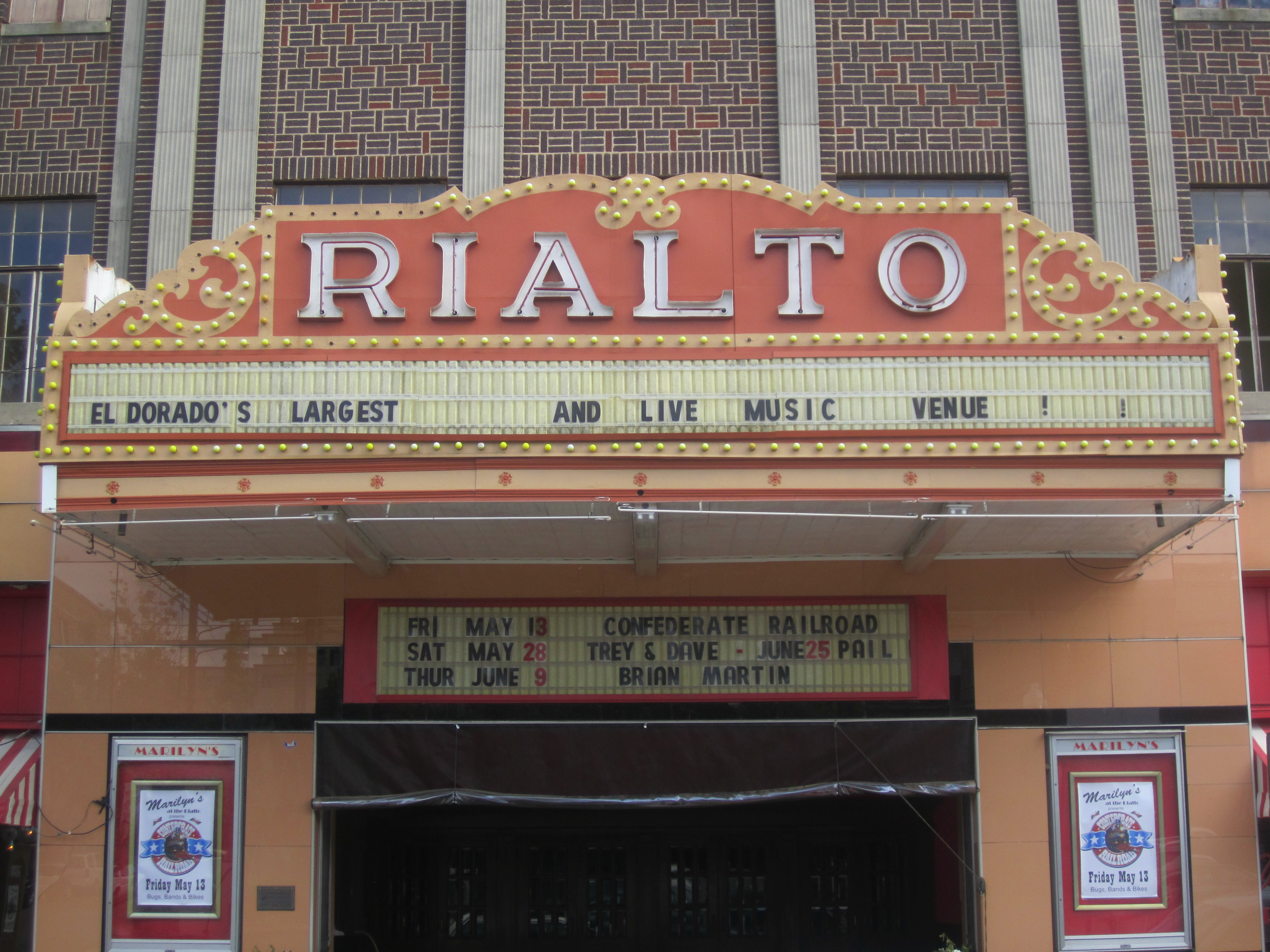
- The Rialto Theatre

- Location within Arkansas Location within the United States
- Location: Courthouse Square, portions of Main, Jefferson, Washington, Jackson, Cedar and Locust Sts., El Dorado, Arkansas
- Coordinates: 33.2119°N 92.66292°W
- Area: 11 acres (4.5 ha)
- Architect: Mann, George R. & Howard Stern; et al.
- Architectural style: Early Commercial, Colonial Revival
- NRHP reference No.: 03000773
- Added to NRHP: August 21, 2003

The El Dorado Commercial Historic District encompasses the historic commercial heart of downtown El Dorado, Arkansas. The city serves as the seat of Union County, and experienced a significant boom in growth during the 1920s, after oil was discovered in the area. The business district that grew in this time is anchored by the Union County Courthouse, at the corner of Main and Washington Streets, where the Confederate memorial is also located. The historic district listed on the National Register of Historic Places in 2003 includes the city blocks surrounding the courthouse, as well as several blocks extending east along Main Street and south along Washington Street. Most of the commercial buildings are one and two stories in height and are built of brick. Notable exceptions include the Exchange Bank building, which was, at nine stories, the county's first skyscraper, and the eight-story Murphy Oil building. There are more than forty contributing properties in the district.

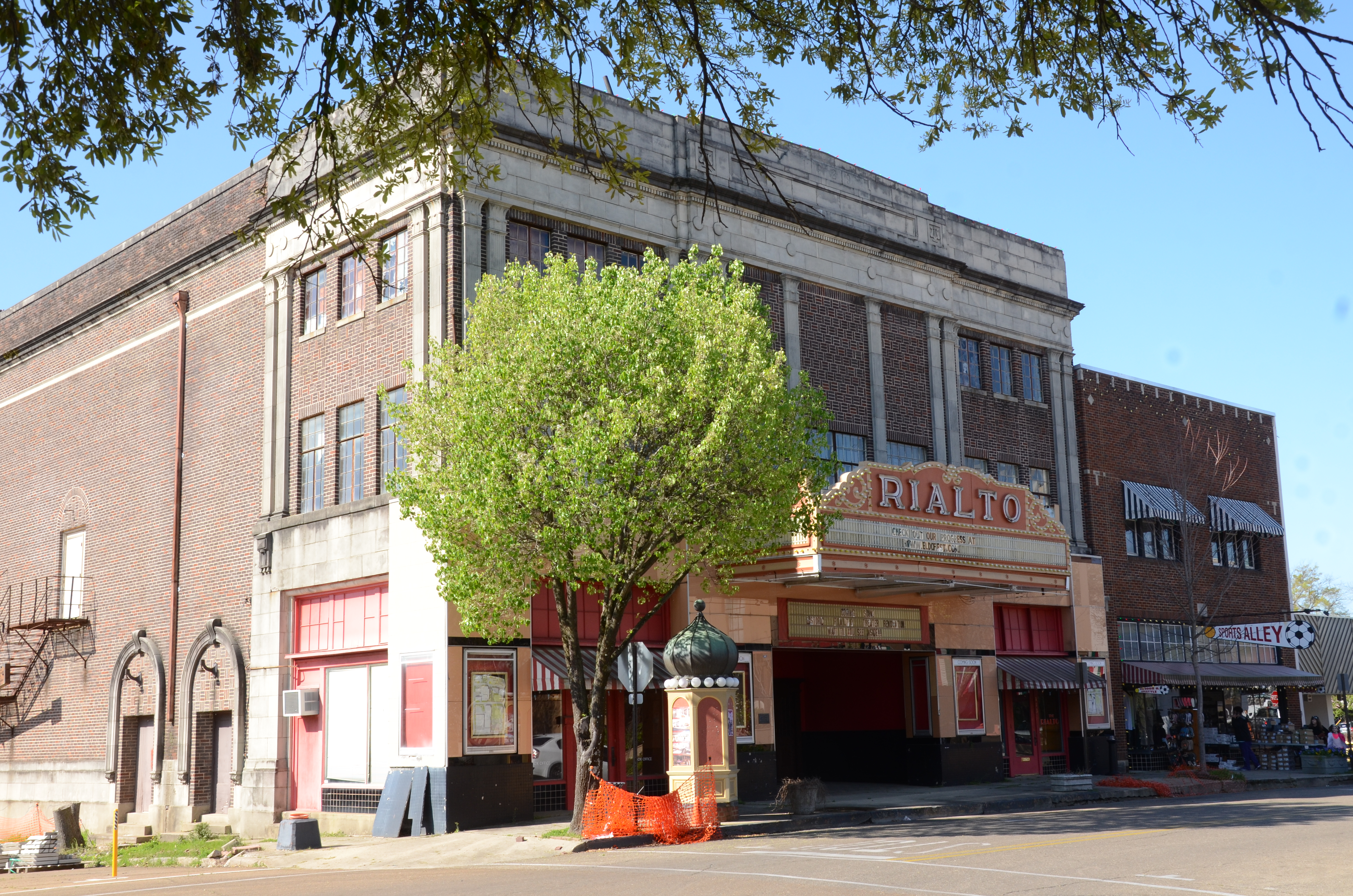
Rialto Theatre Building 2016

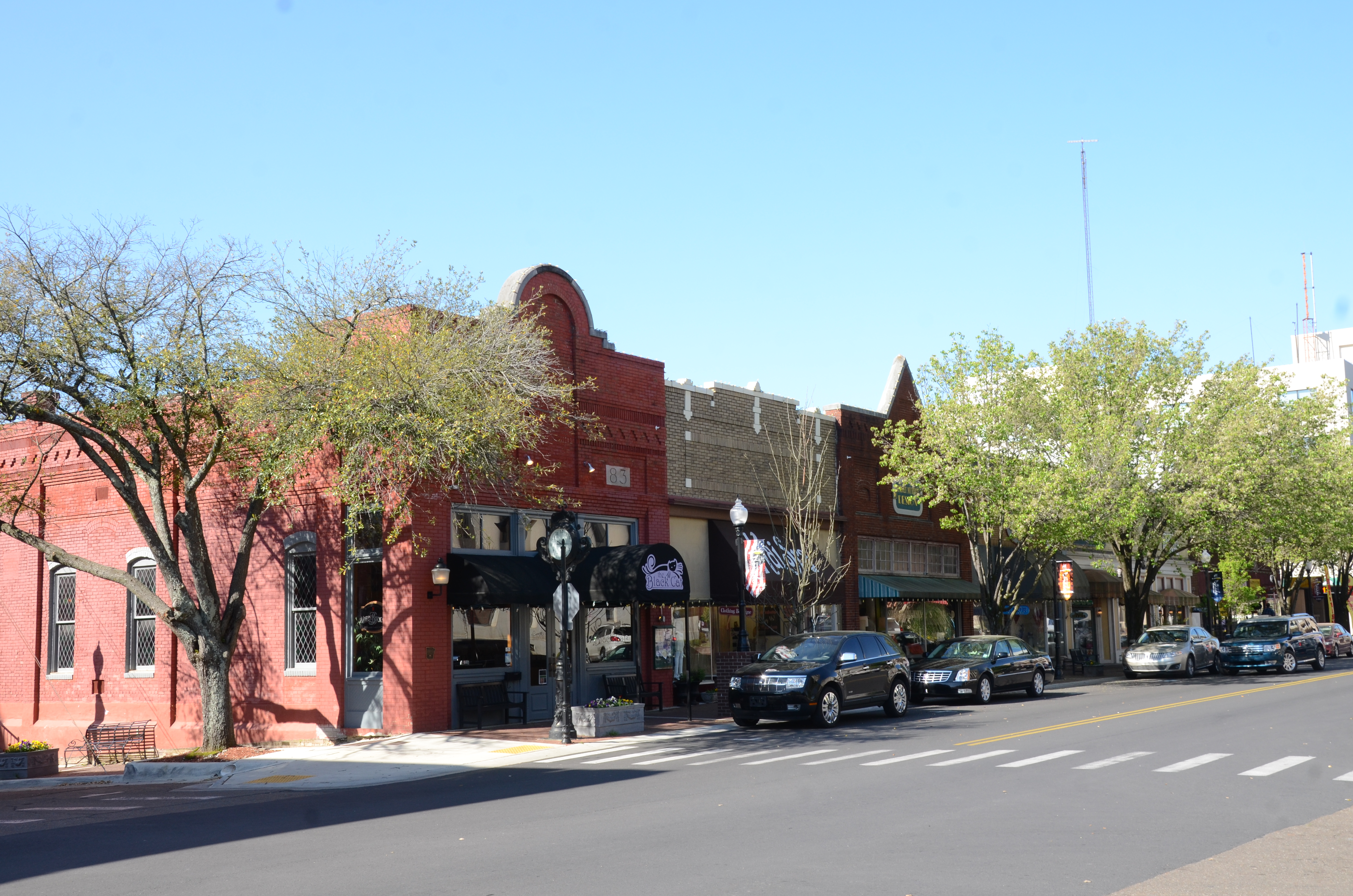
Street view 2016

== See also ==
- National Register of Historic Places listings in Union County, Arkansas
