= Mann & Stern =

American architectural firm

Mann & Stern was an architectural partnership in Arkansas of Eugene John Stern (1884–1961) and George Richard Mann (1856–1939).

A number of their works are listed on the National Register of Historic Places.

Howard Seymour Stern (1910–2002), son of Eugene, also trained as an architect.

== Works ==
- Arkansas State Capitol (1915)
- Little Rock Central High School (1927)
- Albert Pike Hotel (1929)
- Arkansas Consistory (Albert Pike Memorial Temple) 1924
- Arlington Hotel
- Fordyce Bath House
- Arkansas Bank & Trust Company (1916), 103 Walnut St. Newport, AR (Mann & Stern), NRHP-listed
- Exchange Bank, Washington and Oak Sts. El Dorado, AR (Mann & Stern), NRHP-listed
- Little Rock High School, 14th and Park Sts. Little Rock, AR (Almand, Delony, Mann, Stern & Wittenbrg), NRHP-listed
- Little Rock Y.M.C.A., 524 Broadway St. Little Rock, AR (Mann & Stern), NRHP-listed
- Municipal Building, 204 N. West Ave. El Dorado, AR (Mann & Stern), NRHP-listed
- Riceland Hotel, Third and Main Sts. Stuttgart, AR (Mann & Stern), NRHP-listed (1919-1923)
- Union County Courthouse (1927), Union Sq. El Dorado, AR (Peterson/Mann & Stern), NRHP-listed
- Part of the El Dorado Commercial Historic District, El Dorado, AR (Mann, George R. & Howard Stern), NRHP-listed
