= Arlington Hotel (Hot Springs National Park) =

Historic hotel in Arkansas, United States

The Arlington Resort Hotel & Spa
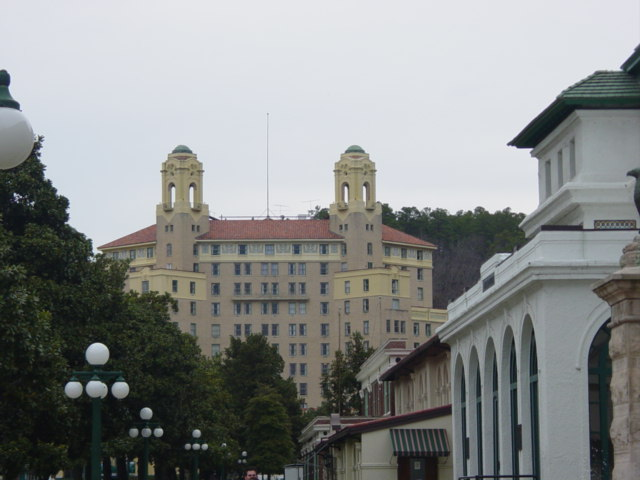

- Location within Arkansas

General information
- Location: Hot Springs National Park, Arkansas, 239 Central Avenue
- Coordinates: 34°31′0″N 93°3′11″W
- Opening: 1875 (original building), 1893 (second building), 1924 (current building)

Other information
- Number of rooms: 484

Website
- www.arlingtonhotel.com
- Arlington Hotel
- U.S. Historic district – Contributing property
- Part of: Hot Springs Central Avenue Historic District (ID85001370)
- Designated CP: June 25, 1985

The Arlington Resort Hotel & Spa is a resort in the Ouachita Mountains of Hot Springs National Park, Arkansas, home of Oaklawn Race Track and the Arkansas Derby. The hotel is located at the north end of "Bathhouse Row".

== History ==
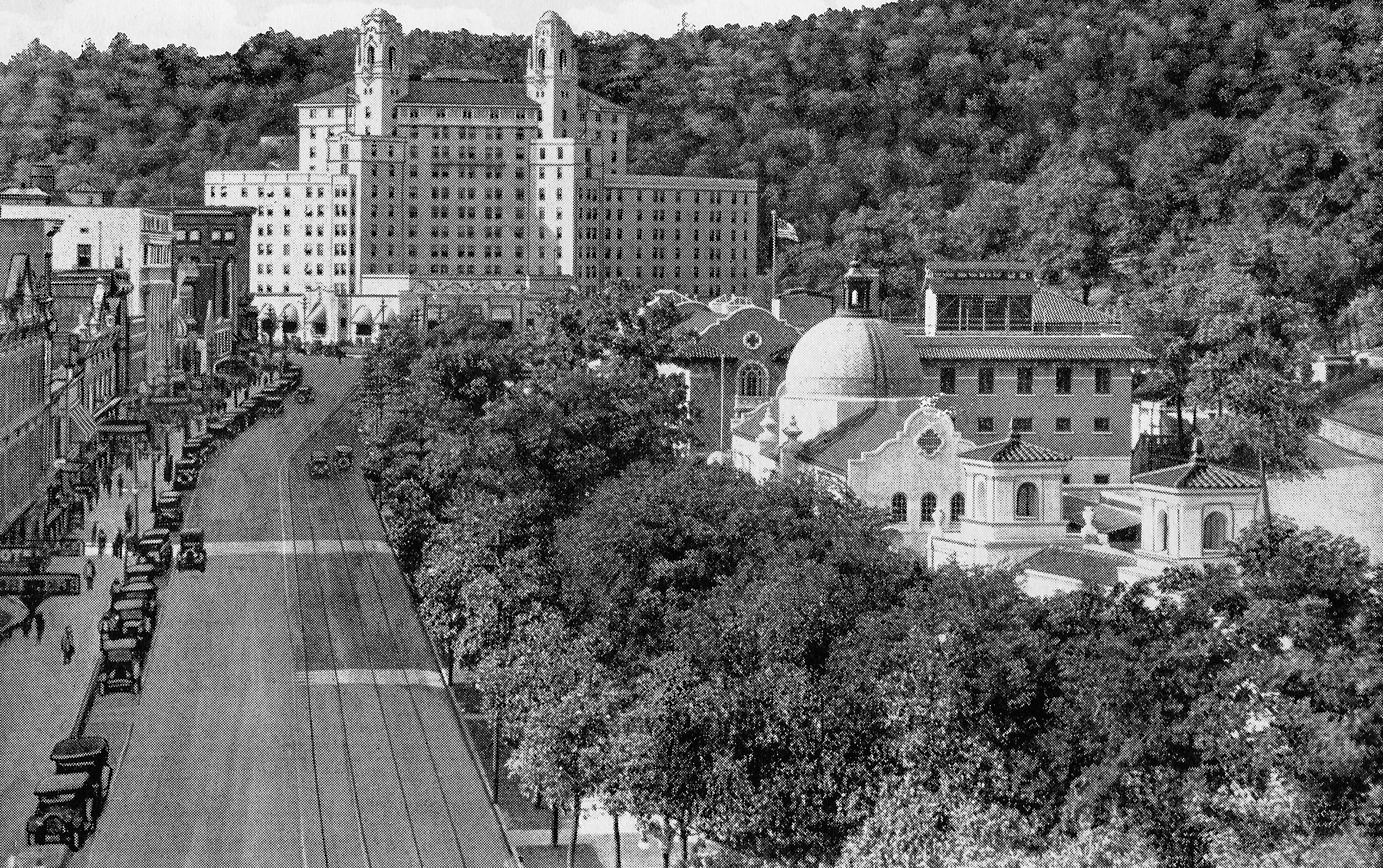
Arlington Hotel at head of Central Avenue after 1925.

Samuel W. Fordyce and two other entrepreneurs financed the construction of the first luxury hotel in the area, the first Arlington Hotel, which opened in 1875. After almost 20 years of use, it was razed to build a new hotel.

When it was rebuilt in 1892–93, the hotel was known as the New Arlington, and was designed with Spanish Renaissance architecture. With 300 rooms in four stories of red brick, it had corner towers. This second Arlington burned to the ground on April 5, 1923, killing one fireman and causing an estimated $1.6 million in damage (1923 dollars, about $23.5M in 2018 dollars).

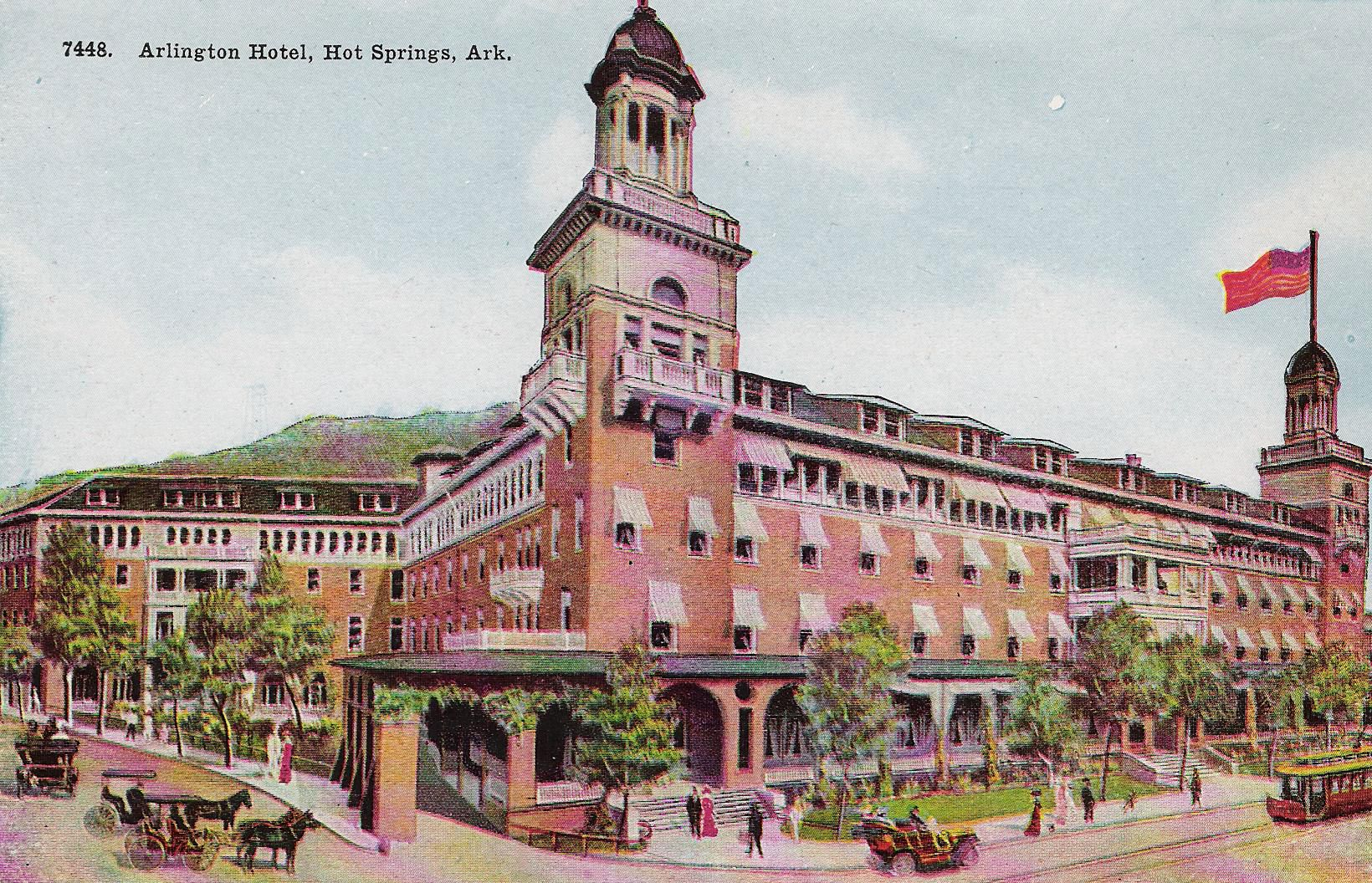
Constructed in 1893, the second Arlington Hotel contained 300 rooms.

Those buildings were at the north end of Bathhouse Row, where the Arlington Park then was created. The third Arlington Hotel, designed by Mann and Stern in 1924, is the current hotel at the "Y" intersection at the corner of Central Avenue and Fountain Street. The building's huge size, Spanish-Colonial Revival style, and placement at the terminus of the town's most important vista made the building a key Hot Springs landmark. The original site became a park at the north end of Bathhouse Row.

In the 1930s, the Arlington Hotel was a favorite vacation spot for Al Capone, who rented out an entire floor for his staff and bodyguards.

Other notable figures who have stayed at the hotel include Babe Ruth, Tony Bennett, Barbra Streisand, and Yoko Ono, as well as U.S. presidents Franklin D. Roosevelt, Harry Truman, George H.W. Bush, and Bill Clinton.

For 30 years the hotel was air conditioned via windows and door louvers until 1955 when the central heating & air was installed. The three guests elevators, in operation since 1969 replaced the original elevators that were installed in 1924. The original bath house elevator – lined with beveled glass and shining brass still exists and still manually operates.

The Arlington Hotel was referred to as “the most elegant and complete hotel in America” in Charles Cutter's 1892 Guide Book.

== Present day and renovation efforts ==
The nearly 100-year old hotel is under extensive renovations as of August of 2023. CEO of Sky Capitol Group Al Rajabi purchased the hotel and, backed by Arkansas Federal Credit Union, is restoring the exterior facade back to how it looked in 1924. This preservation effort also seeks to modernize the building to update it to current building codes, as well as modern guest sensibilities.
