= Aristocrat Motor Inn =

- U.S. National Register of Historic Places
- U.S. Historic district – Contributing property
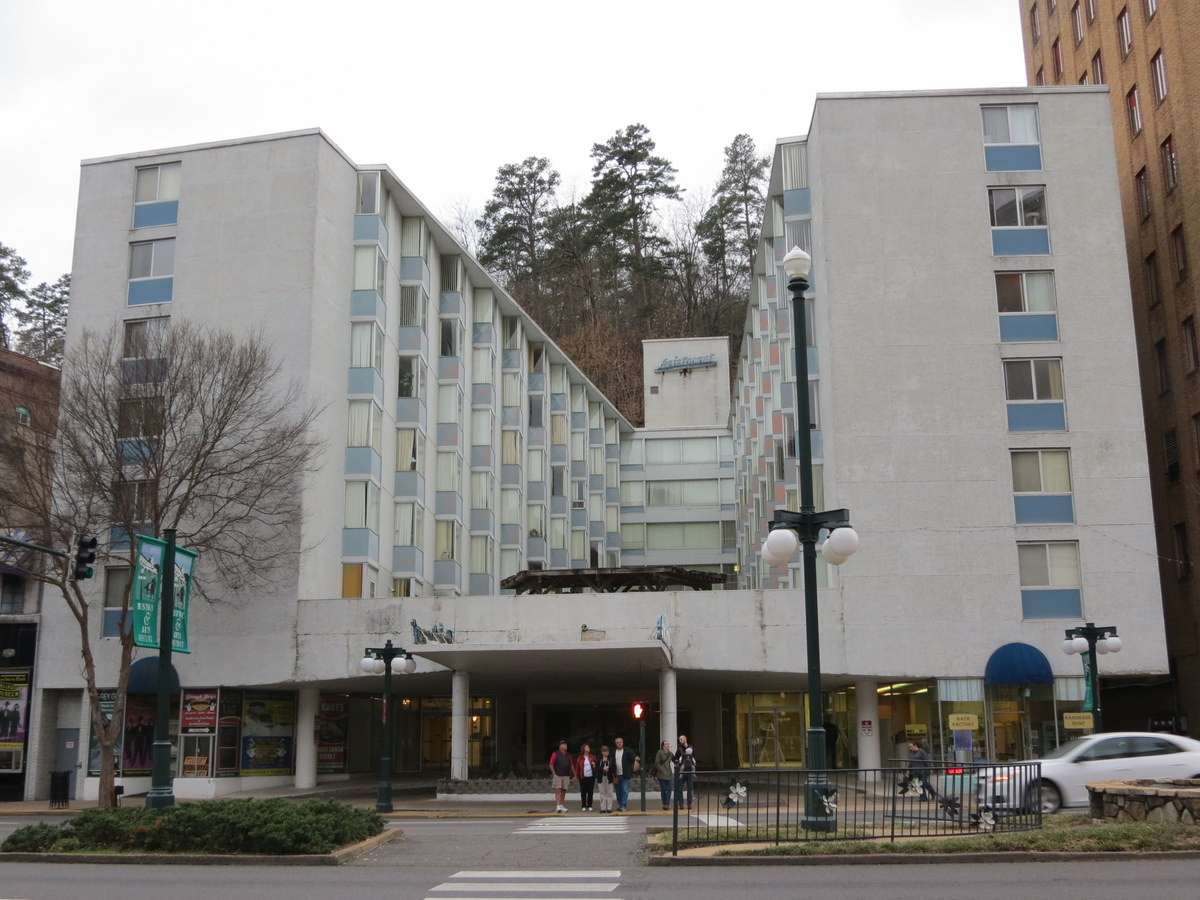

- Location within Arkansas Location within the United States
- Location: 240 Central Ave., Hot Springs, Arkansas
- Coordinates: 34°30′59″N 93°3′13″W
- Area: 1 acre (0.40 ha)
- Architectural style: Mid-Century Modern
- Part of: Hot Springs Central Avenue Historic District (ID85001370)
- NRHP reference No.: 100000552

Significant dates
- Added to NRHP: January 24, 2017
- Designated CP: June 25, 1985

The Aristocrat Motor Inn is a historic hotel building at 240 Central Avenue in Hot Springs, Arkansas. It is a large seven-story structure, with a six-story U-shaped tower set on a basically rectangular ground floor. It is finished in glass, brick, and metal, in the Mid-Century Modern style. The tower is organized around a central courtyard, with the interior facades in a sawtooth pattern to maximize light coming into the hotel rooms facing inward. The hotel was built in 1963 by Samuel Kirsch, a local businessman engaged in a variety of pursuits. It was one of the first hotels built along the city's Central Avenue to feature a Modernist exterior. It was operated as a hotel until 1978, and was after converted into low-income housing.

The property was listed on the National Register of Historic Places in 2017.

== See also ==
- National Register of Historic Places listings in Garland County, Arkansas
