= Union County Courthouse (Arkansas) =

- U.S. National Register of Historic Places
- U.S. Historic district – Contributing property
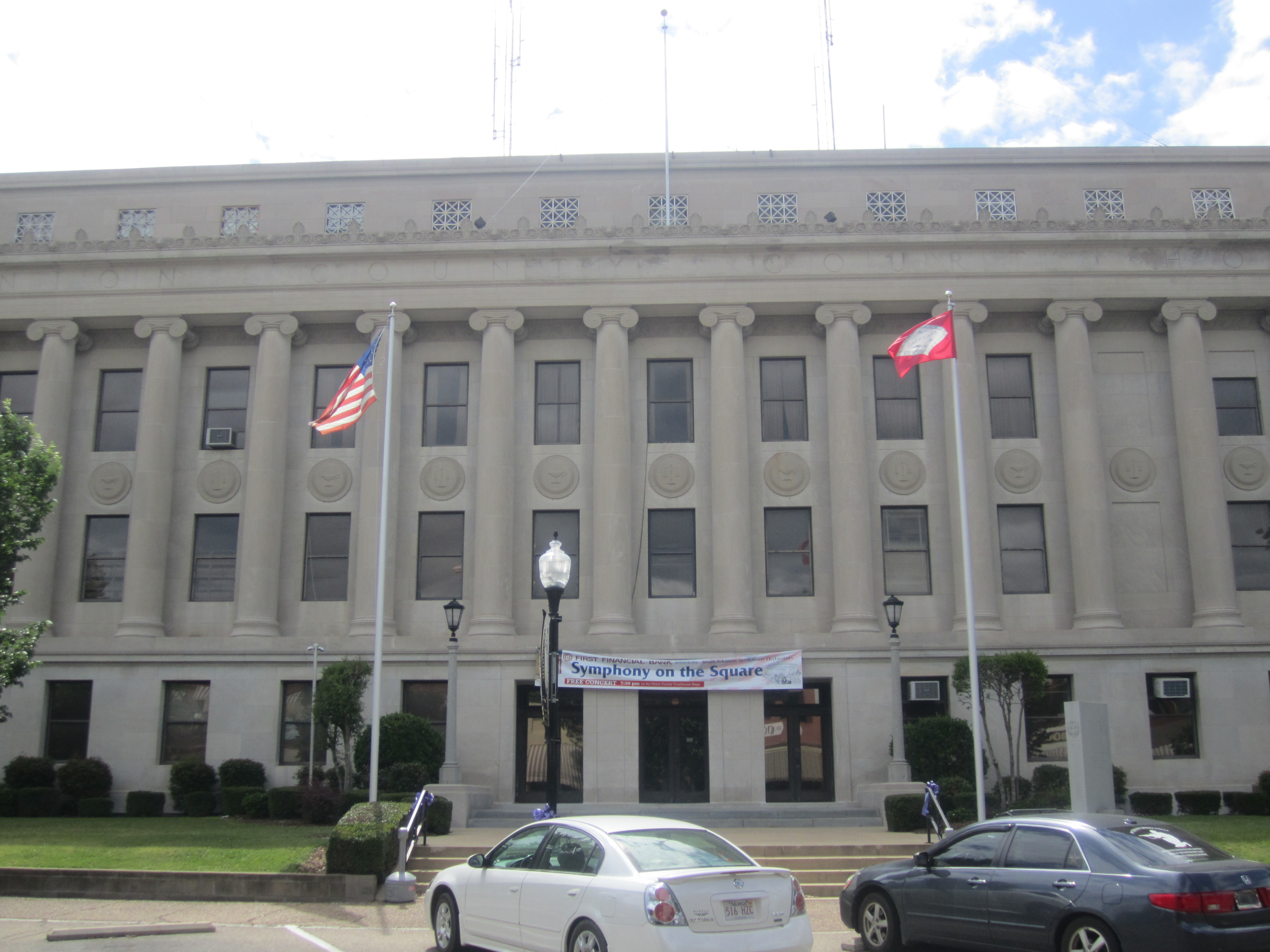

- Location within Arkansas Location within the United States
- Location: Union Square, El Dorado, Arkansas
- Coordinates: 33°12′43″N 92°39′50″W
- Area: less than one acre
- Built: 1927
- Built by: Peterson/Mann & Stern
- Architectural style: Classical Revival, Neo-Classical Revival
- Part of: El Dorado Commercial Historic District (ID03000773)
- NRHP reference No.: 83001169

Significant dates
- Added to NRHP: June 30, 1983
- Designated CP: August 21, 2003

The Union County Courthouse is a courthouse in El Dorado, Arkansas, United States, the county seat of Union County, built in 1927. It was listed on the National Register of Historic Places in 1983. The courthouse was built in the Classic Revival and Greek Revival styles by Mann & Stern and anchors the center of Union Square.

== History ==
Union County was established in 1829 from Hempstead County and Clark County. The county seat began at Ecore Fabre and was moved to Scarborough's Landing. Cotton farmers again requested the county seat to move in 1843. It was moved to the county's highest point and was platted as El Dorado.

== Architecture ==
The four-story courthouse has an entirely smooth limestone exterior with 40 freestanding ionic columns. Scales of justice and lanterns adorn the exterior. Inside the courthouse is a two-story marble art deco atrium of marble and a courtroom with walnut wainscoting, a plaster ceiling featuring gilded rosettes and walls textured to resemble stone.

== See also ==
- List of county courthouses in Arkansas
- National Register of Historic Places listings in Union County, Arkansas
