= Central Avenue Historic District (Hot Springs, Arkansas) =

Historic district in Arkansas, United States

- Hot Springs Central Avenue Historic District
- U.S. National Register of Historic Places
- U.S. Historic district
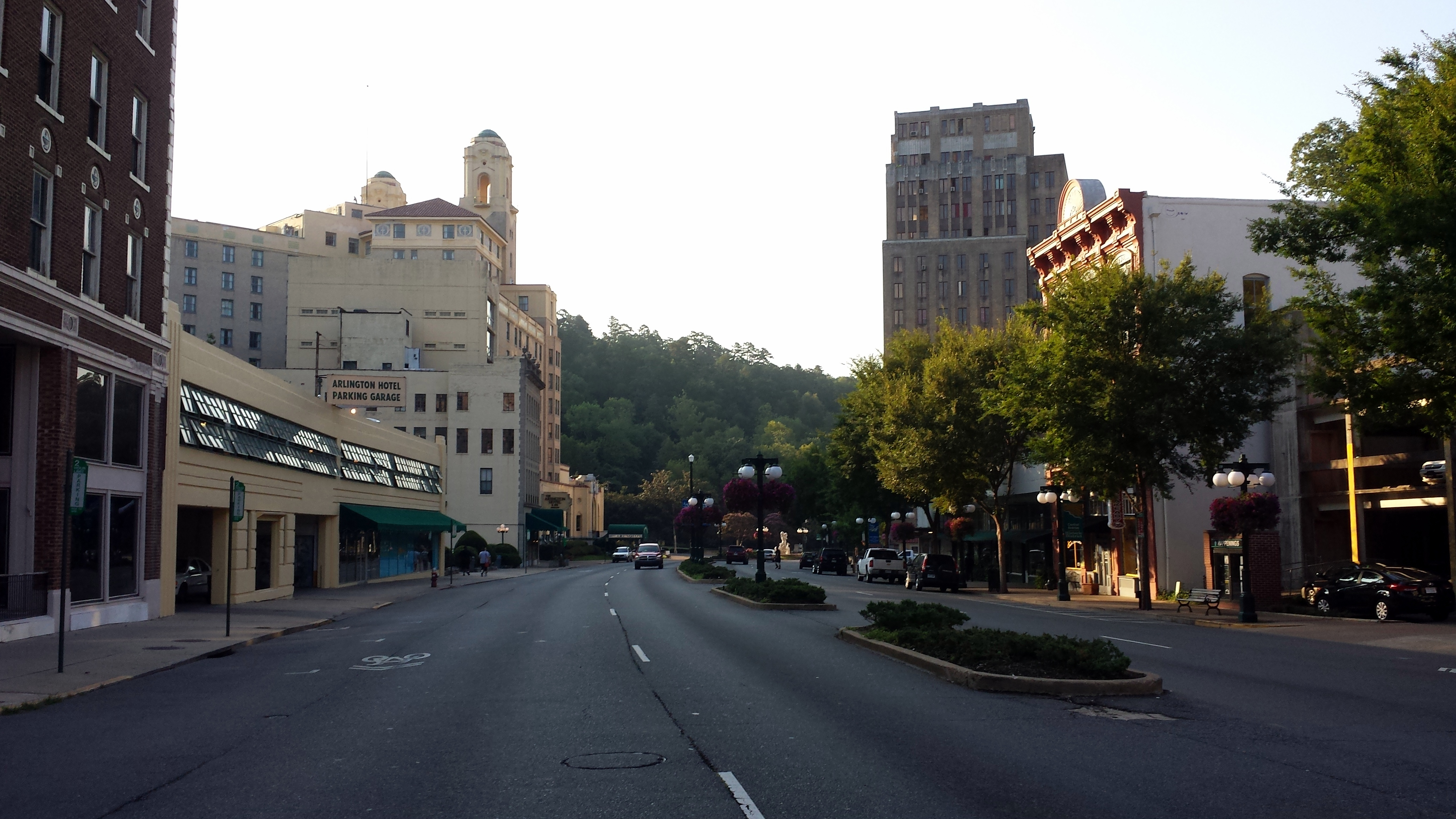
- Looking south down Central Avenue

- Location within Arkansas Location within the United States
- Location: Central Avenue between Prospect and Park Streets, Hot Springs, Arkansas
- Area: 22 acres (8.9 ha)
- Architectural style: International, Greek Revival, Late Victorian
- NRHP reference No.: 85001370 (original); 07000957 (increase); 100004164 (decrease)

Significant dates
- Added to NRHP: June 25, 1985
- Boundary increase: September 19, 2007
- Boundary decrease: July 8, 2019

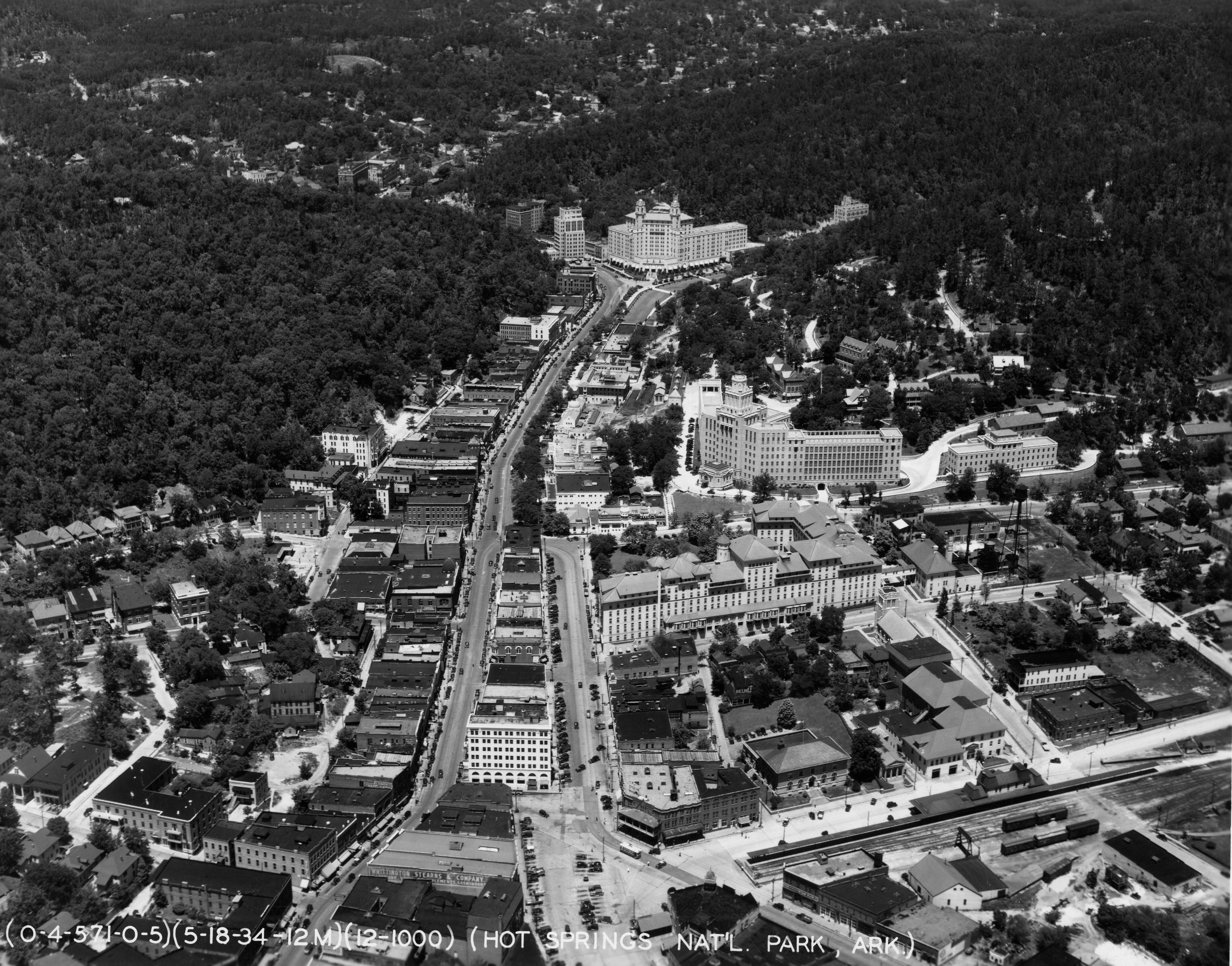
Aerial view, 1934

The Central Avenue Historic District is the historic economic center of Hot Springs, Arkansas, United States, located directly across Central Avenue from Bathhouse Row. Built primarily between 1886 and 1930, the hotels, shops, restaurants and offices on Central Avenue have greatly benefited from the city's tourism related to the thermal waters thought to contain healing properties. Built in a variety of architectural styles, the majority of the buildings constituting the district are two- or three-story structures. The district was listed on the National Register of Historic Places in 1985, at which time forty contributing structures were identified; 101 Park Avenue was added in 2007, and a boundary decrease was approved in 2019.

== DeSoto Mineral Springs Building ==
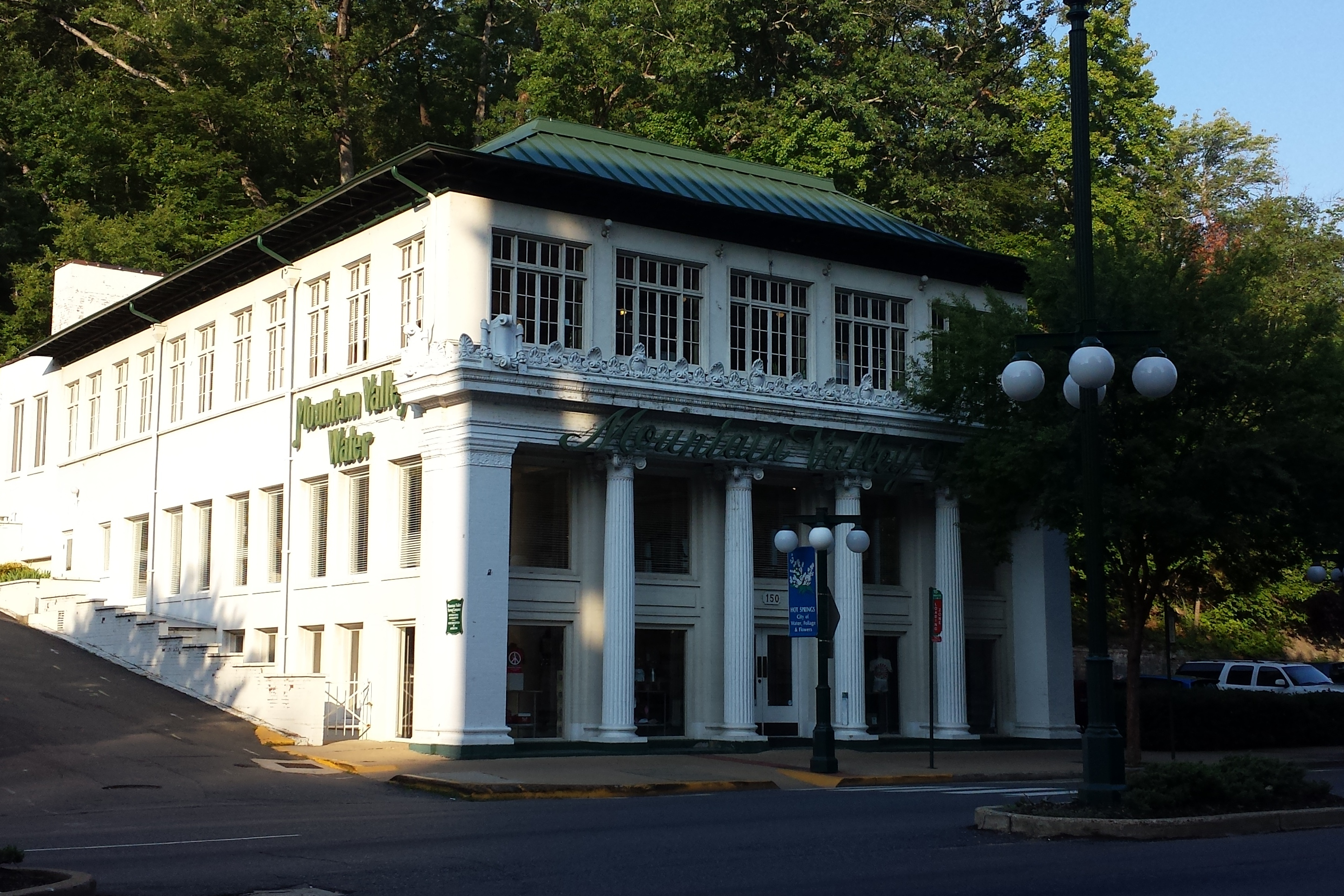

The DeSoto Mineral Springs Building, located at 150 Central was built in 1915 in the neoclassical style. The white, five bay brick building has significant ornament on the facade toward Central Avenue. Built as a depot for its namesake company, the bottling plant was located just behind the building. Originally two stories, the structure was expanded to add a third story to accommodate a grand dance floor in 1920. August Schlafley bought DeSoto and Mountain Valley Spring Water in 1924 and combined the operations. In 1936 under the Mountain Valley Spring Water name, Schlafley relocated the company headquarters to the DeSoto Building, where it has remained ever since (except between 1966 and 1987, when new ownership relocated the headquarters to Paramus, New Jersey).

== See also ==
- National Register of Historic Places listings in Garland County, Arkansas
