= Little Rock Y.M.C.A. =

- Little Rock YMCA
- U.S. National Register of Historic Places
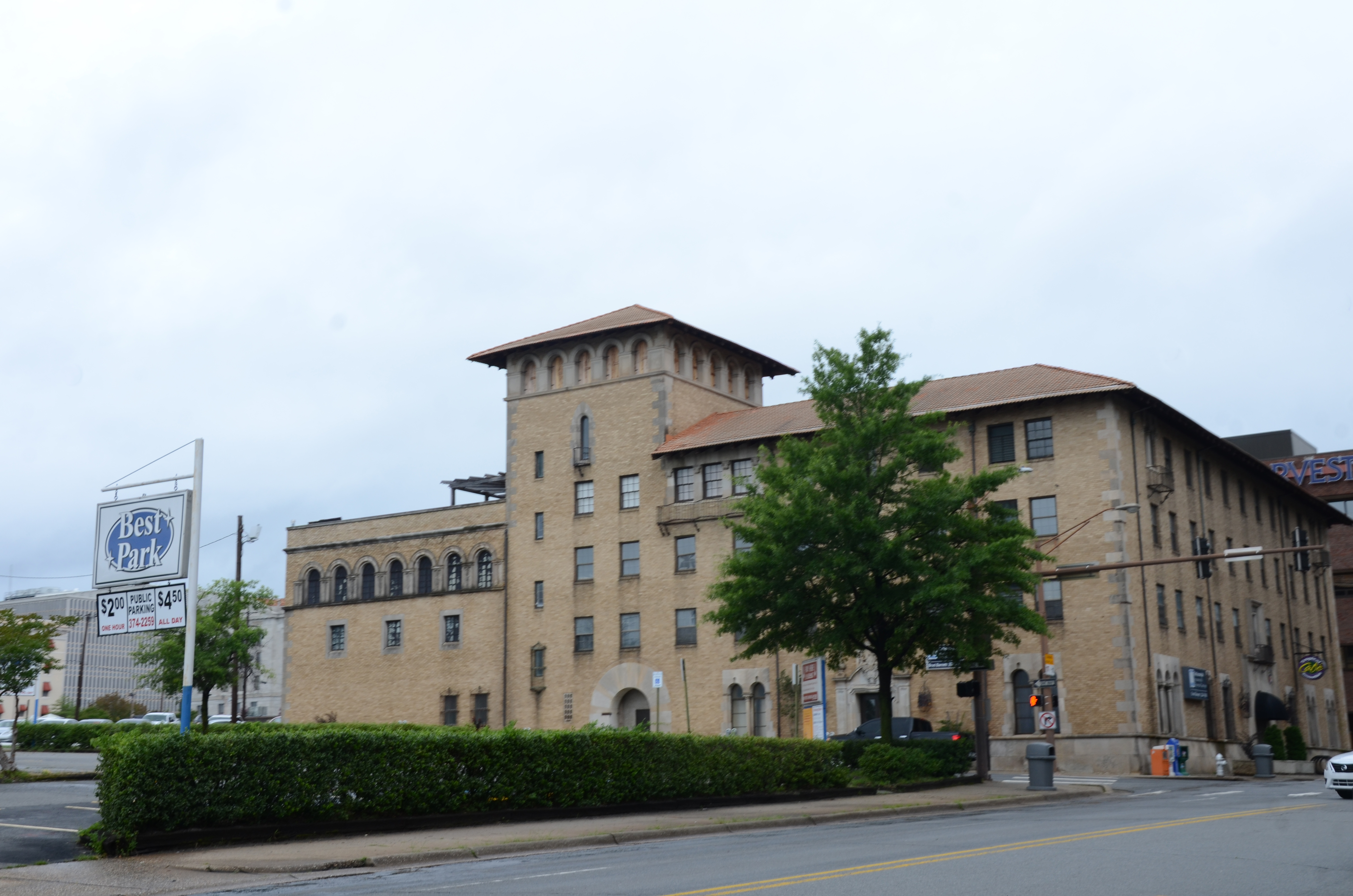

- Location within Arkansas Location within the United States
- Location: 524 Broadway St., Little Rock, Arkansas
- Coordinates: 34°44′39″N 92°16′33″W
- Area: less than one acre
- Built: 1928
- Architect: Mann & Stern
- Architectural style: Mission/Spanish revival
- NRHP reference No.: 79000456
- Added to NRHP: July 22, 1979

The former Little Rock YMCA is a historic building in downtown Little Rock, Arkansas. It is a large four-story brick building, with Mission Revival styling that includes a tower rising to an arcaded open top story. It was built in 1928, and was one of the largest projects of Little Rock's leading architectural firm of the period, Mann and Stern. The building has since been converted to commercial uses.

The building was listed on the National Register of Historic Places in 1979.

== See also ==
- List of YMCA buildings and structures
- National Register of Historic Places listings in Little Rock, Arkansas
